= Denmark =

Country in Northern Europe

Denmark Danmark (Danish)
- Constituent part of the Kingdom of Denmark
- Flag National coat of arms
- Motto: Forbundne, forpligtet, for kongeriget Danmark (Note: The motto of Denmark is the motto of the reigning monarch, chosen after accession. The current motto is that of the current monarch, Frederik X.) (United, committed, for the Kingdom of Denmark)
- Anthems: "Der er et yndigt land" (Danish) (English: "There Is a Lovely Country") "Kong Christian stod ved højen mast" (Danish) (Note: "Kong Christian" has equal status as a national anthem but is generally used only on royal and military occasions.) (English: "King Christian Stood by the Lofty Mast")
- Location of metropolitan Denmark (dark green) – in Europe (light green & dark grey) – in the European Union (light green)
- Sovereign state: Kingdom of Denmark
- Consolidation: c. 8th century
- Constitutional Act: 5 June 1849
- Capital and largest city: Copenhagen; 55°43′N 12°34′E
- Official languages: Danish
- Regional languages: German (Note: German is recognised as a protected minority language in the South Jutland area of Denmark.)
- Ethnic groups (2025): 83.7% Danish; 16.3% Others
- Religion (2024): 71.4% Lutheranism (official); 4.3% Islam; 24.3% Other / none
- Demonym(s): Danish; Dane
- Government: Unitary parliamentary constitutional monarchy
  - Monarch: Frederik X
  - Prime Minister: Mette Frederiksen
- Legislature: Folketing

Area
  - Total: 43,094 km^{2} (16,639 sq mi) (130th)
  - Water (%): 1.74
- Highest elevation (Møllehøj): 170.86 m (560.6 ft)

Population
  - 2026 estimate: ▲6,031,699 (Note: This data is for Denmark proper only. For data relevant to Greenland and the Faroe Islands see their respective articles.) (112th)
  - Density: 140/km^{2} (362.6/sq mi) (93rd)
- GDP (PPP): 2026 estimate
  - Total: ▲$560.707 billion (54th)
  - Per capita: ▲$92,876 (11th)
- GDP (nominal): 2026 estimate
  - Total: ▲$499.354 billion (37th)
  - Per capita: ▲$82,714 (9th)
- Gini (2022): ▲27.7 low
- HDI (2023): ▲0.962 very high · 4th
- Currency: Danish krone
- Time zone: UTC+01:00 (CET)
  - Summer (DST): UTC+02:00 (CEST)
- Calling code: +45
- ISO 3166 code: DK
- Internet TLD: .dk (Note: The top-level domain name .eu is shared with other European Union countries.)

Denmark (Note: Danish: Danmark, pronounced [ˈtænmɑk]) is a Nordic country in Northern Europe. It is the metropole and most populous constituent of the Kingdom of Denmark, (Note: Danish: Kongeriget Danmark, pronounced [ˈkʰɔŋəʁiːð̩ ˈtænmɑk].) also known as the Danish Realm, a constitutionally unitary state that includes the autonomous territories of the Faroe Islands and Greenland in the north Atlantic Ocean. Metropolitan Denmark, (Note: The Kingdom of Denmark's territory in continental Europe is referred to as "metropolitan Denmark", "Denmark proper" (Danish: egentlig Danmark), or simply "Denmark". In this article, usage of "Denmark" excludes the Faroe Islands and Greenland.) also called "continental Denmark" or "Denmark proper", consists of the northern Jutland peninsula and an archipelago of 406 islands. It is the southernmost of the Scandinavian countries, lying southwest of Sweden, south of Norway, and north of Germany, with which it shares a short border. Metropolitan Denmark is situated between the North Sea to the west and the Baltic Sea to the east. (Note: The island of Bornholm is offset to the east of the rest of the country, in the Baltic Sea.)

The Kingdom of Denmark, including the Faroe Islands and Greenland, has roughly 1,400 islands greater than 100 square metres (1,100 sq ft) in area; 443 have been named and 78 are inhabited. Denmark's population is over 6 million (1 May 2025), of which roughly 40% live in Zealand, (Sjælland) the largest and most populated island in Metropolitan Denmark; Copenhagen, (København) the capital and largest city of the Danish Realm, is situated on Zealand and Amager and Slotsholmen. Composed mostly of flat, arable land, Denmark is characterised by sandy coasts, low elevation, and a temperate climate. Denmark exercises hegemonic influence in the Danish Realm, devolving powers to the other constituent entities to handle their internal affairs. Home rule was established in the Faroe Islands in 1948; Greenland achieved home rule in 1979 and further autonomy in 2009.

The unified Kingdom of Denmark emerged in the eighth century AD as a maritime power amid the struggle for control of the Baltic Sea. In 1397, it formed the Kalmar Union with Norway and Sweden. This union persisted until Sweden's secession in 1523. The remaining Kingdom of Denmark–Norway endured a series of wars in the 17th century that resulted in territorial cessions to Sweden. A surge of nationalist movements in the 19th century were defeated by the Danes in the First Schleswig War of 1848. The adoption of the Constitution of Denmark on 5 June 1849 ended the absolute monarchy. In the Second Schleswig War, Denmark lost Schleswig-Holstein, which led to changes in Danish politics henceforth emphasising social cohesion in the diminished realm, as well as the clearing of the vast moors of Jutland for agriculture, new Christian movements split between Indre Mission and Grundtvig, but generally a stronger self-perception among the people of belonging to a unified country and state. In 1920, North Schleswig became Danish again.

Denmark began industrialising in the mid 19th century, becoming a major agricultural exporter. It introduced social and labour market reforms in the early 20th century, forming the basis for the present welfare state model and advanced mixed economy. Denmark remained neutral during World War I; Danish neutrality was violated in World War II by a rapid German invasion in April 1940. During occupation, a resistance movement emerged in 1943, while Iceland declared independence in 1944; Denmark was liberated after the end of the war in May 1945. In 1973, Denmark, together with Greenland but not the Faroe Islands, became a member of what is now the European Union; however, it negotiated certain opt-outs, such as retaining its own currency, the krone.

Denmark is a developed country with an advanced high-income economy, high standard of living, and robust social welfare policies. Danish culture and society are broadly progressive egalitarian, and socially liberal; Denmark was the first country to legally recognise same-sex partnerships. It is a founding member of NATO, the Nordic Council, the OECD, the OSCE, the Council of Europe, and the United Nations, and is part of the Schengen Area. Denmark maintains close political, cultural, and linguistic ties with its Scandinavian neighbours.

== Etymology ==
The etymology of the name "Denmark" is of some scholarly debate, though most dictionaries and handbooks derive "Dan" from a word meaning "low ground". The element mark is believed to mean woodland, borderland (see marches), or border, with probable references to the border forests in south Schleswig.

== History ==
=== Prehistory ===
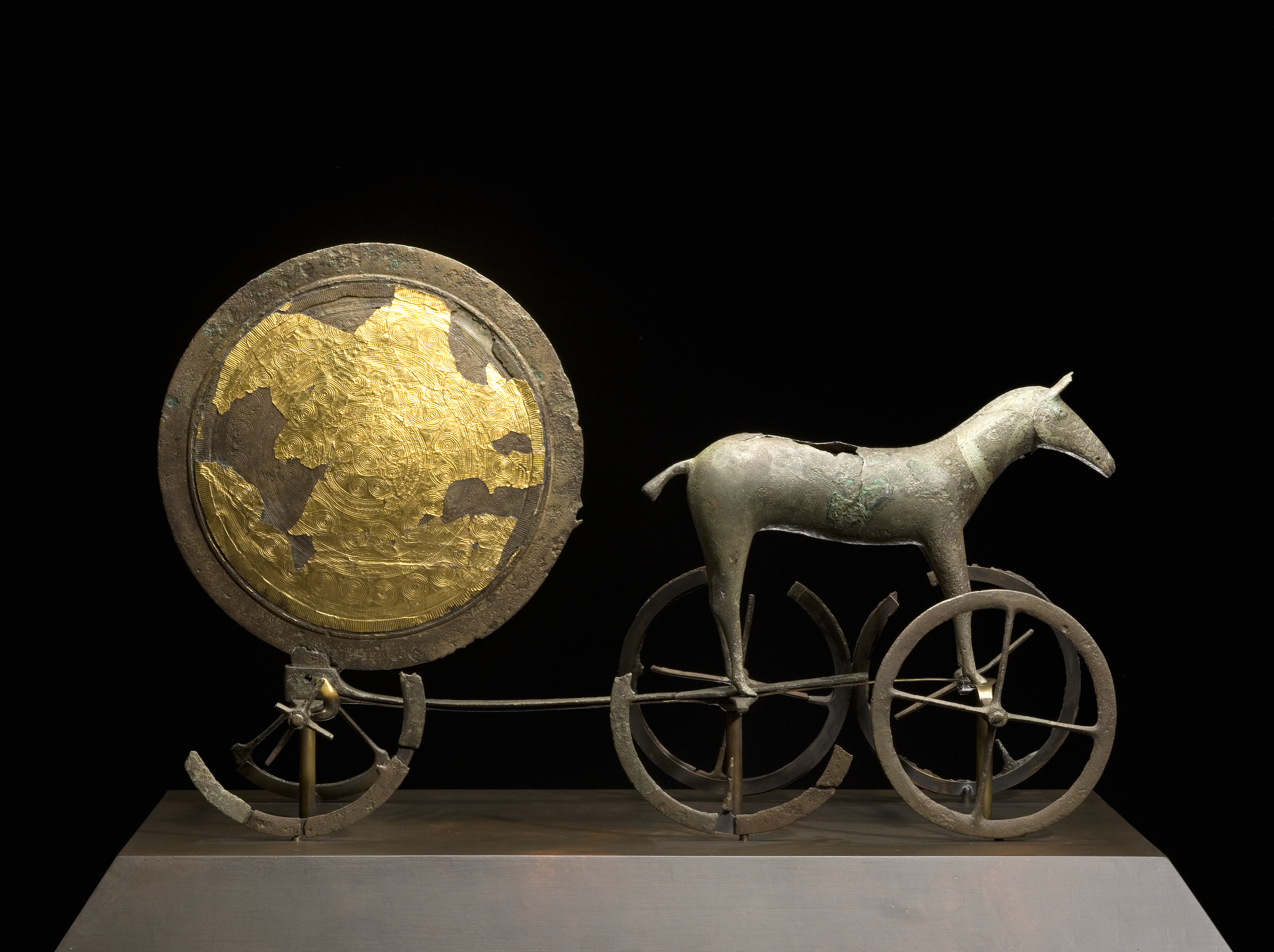
The gilded side of the Trundholm sun chariot dating from the Nordic Bronze Age

The earliest archaeological finds in Denmark date back to the Eem interglacial period from 130,000 to 110,000 BC. Denmark has been inhabited since around 12,500 BC and agriculture has been evident since 3900 BC. The Nordic Bronze Age (1800–600 BC) in Denmark was marked by burial mounds, which left an abundance of findings including lurs and the Sun Chariot.

During the Pre-Roman Iron Age (500 BC – AD 1), native groups began migrating south, and the first tribal Danes came to the country between the Pre-Roman and the Germanic Iron Age, in the Roman Iron Age (AD 1–400). The Roman provinces maintained trade routes and relations with native tribes in Denmark, and Roman coins have been found in Denmark. Evidence of strong Celtic cultural influence dates from this period in Denmark and much of North-West Europe and is among other things reflected in the finding of the Gundestrup cauldron.

The tribal Danes came from the east Danish islands (Zealand) and Scania, today Skåne in Southern Sweden, and spoke an early form of North Germanic. Historians believe that before their arrival, most of Jutland and the nearest islands were settled by tribal Jutes. Many Jutes migrated to Great Britain, according to legend some as mercenaries of Brythonic King Vortigern, and formed the south-eastern territories of Kent, the Isle of Wight and other areas, where they settled. They were later absorbed or ethnically cleansed by the invading Angles and Saxons, who formed the Anglo-Saxons. The remaining Jutish population in Jutland assimilated in with the settling Danes.

A short note about the Dani in Getica by the historian Jordanes is believed to be an early mention of the Danes, one of the ethnic groups from whom modern Danes are descended. The Danevirke defence structures were built in phases from the 3rd century forward and the sheer size of the construction efforts in AD 737 are attributed to the emergence of a Danish king. A new runic alphabet was first used around the same time and Ribe, the oldest town of Denmark, was founded about AD 700.

=== Viking and Middle Ages ===
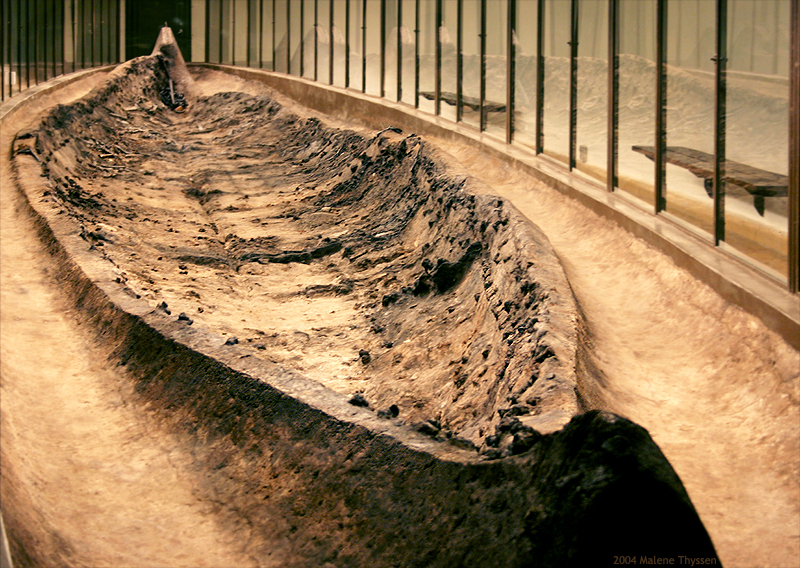
The Ladby ship, the largest ship burial found in Denmark

From the 8th to the 10th century the population of the wider Scandinavian region was called Vikings by non-Scandinavians. While they mostly lived off agriculture, fishing and trade, they were excellent sailors and would travel as far as Iceland, Greenland and Canada. They traded in all parts of Europe, down to Constantinople and beyond, but would also raid local settlements and set up colonies in far-flung places. The Danish Vikings were most actively raiding the eastern and southern British Isles and Western Europe. They settled in parts of England (known as the Danelaw) under King Sweyn Forkbeard in 1013, and in France where Danes and Norwegians were allowed to settle in what would become Normandy in exchange of allegiance to Robert I of France with Rollo as first ruler. Some Anglo-Saxon pence of this period have been found in Denmark.

Denmark was largely consolidated by the late 8th century and its rulers are consistently referred to in Frankish sources as kings (reges). Under the reign of Gudfred in 804 the Danish kingdom may have included all the lands of Jutland, Scania and the Danish islands, excluding Bornholm.

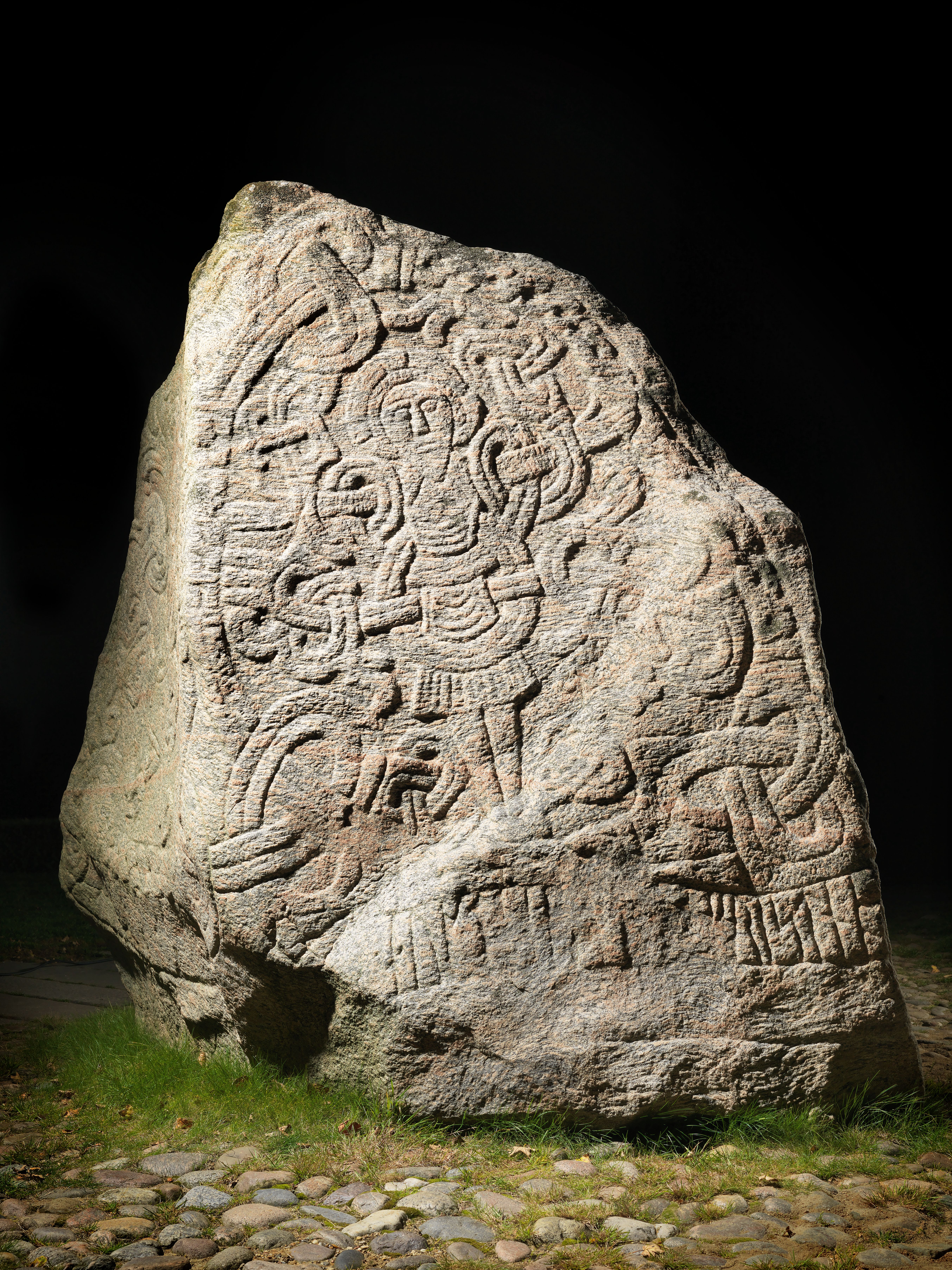
Larger of the two Jelling stones, raised by Harald Bluetooth

The extant Danish monarchy traces its roots back to Gorm the Old, who established his reign in the early 10th century. As attested by the Jelling stones, the Danes were Christianised around 965 by Harald Bluetooth, the son of Gorm and Thyra. It is believed that Denmark became Christian for political reasons so as not to get invaded by the Holy Roman Empire. A rising Christian power in Europe, the Holy Roman Empire was an important trading partner for the Danes. As a deterrent against this threat, Harald built six fortresses around Denmark called Trelleborg and built a further Danevirke. In the early 11th century, Canute the Great won and united Denmark, England, and Norway for almost 30 years with a Scandinavian army.

Throughout the High and Late Middle Ages, Denmark also included Skåneland (the areas of Scania, Halland, and Blekinge in present-day southern Sweden) and Danish kings ruled Danish Estonia, as well as the duchies of Schleswig and Holstein. Most of the latter two now form the state of Schleswig-Holstein in northern Germany.

In 1397, Denmark entered into a personal union known as the Kalmar Union with Norway and Sweden, united under Queen Margaret I. The three countries were to be treated as equals in the union. However, even from the start, Margaret may not have been so idealistic; treating Denmark as the clear "senior" partner of the union. Thus, much of the next 125 years of Scandinavian history revolves around this union, with Sweden breaking off and re-joining the Kalmar Union repeatedly. The issue was for practical purposes resolved on 17 June 1523, as Swedish King Gustav Vasa conquered the city of Stockholm. The Protestant Reformation spread to Scandinavia in the 1530s, and following the Count's Feud civil war, Denmark converted to Lutheranism in 1536. Later that year, Denmark entered into a new union with Norway.

=== Early modern history (1536–1849) ===
Extent of the Dano-Norwegian Realm. After the Napoleonic Wars, Norway was ceded to Sweden while Denmark kept the Faroe Islands, Greenland, and Iceland.

After Sweden permanently broke away from the Kalmar Union, Denmark tried on several occasions to reassert control over its neighbour. King Christian IV attacked Sweden in the 1611–1613 Kalmar War but failed to accomplish his main objective of forcing it to return to the union. The war led to no territorial changes, but Sweden was forced to pay a war indemnity of 1 million silver riksdaler to Denmark, an amount known as the Älvsborg ransom. King Christian used this money to found several towns and fortresses, most notably Glückstadt (founded as a rival to Hamburg) and Christiania. Inspired by the Dutch East India Company, he founded a similar Danish company and planned to claim Ceylon as a colony, but the company only managed to acquire Tranquebar on India's Coromandel Coast. Denmark's large colonial aspirations included a few key trading posts in Africa and India. While Denmark's trading posts in India were of little note, it played an important role in the highly lucrative Atlantic slave trade, through its trading outposts in Fort Christiansborg in Osu, Ghana through which 1.5 million slaves were traded. While the Danish colonial empire was sustained by trade with other major powers, and plantations – ultimately a lack of resources led to its stagnation.

In the Thirty Years' War, Christian tried to become the leader of the Lutheran states in Germany but suffered a crushing defeat at the Battle of Lutter. The result was that the Catholic army under Albrecht von Wallenstein was able to invade, occupy, and pillage Jutland, forcing Denmark to withdraw from the war. Denmark managed to avoid territorial concessions, but King Gustavus Adolphus' intervention in Germany was seen as a sign that the military power of Sweden was on the rise while Denmark's influence in the region was declining. Swedish armies invaded Jutland in 1643 and claimed Scania in 1644. In the 1645 Treaty of Brømsebro, Denmark surrendered Halland, Gotland, the last parts of Danish Estonia, and several provinces in Norway.

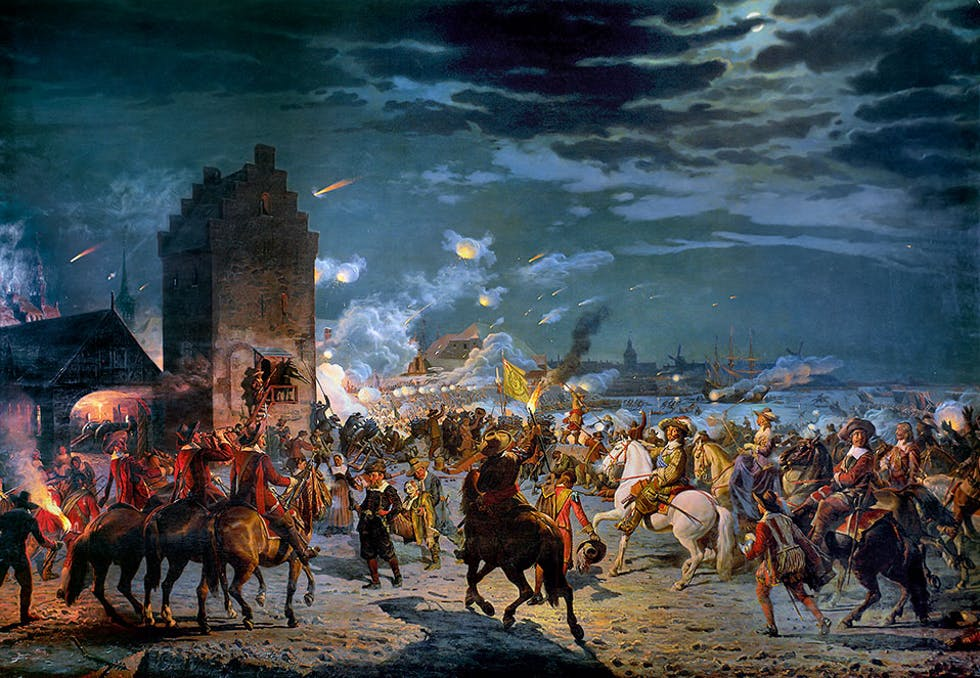
The Assault on Copenhagen on 11 February 1659 during the Second Northern War. Danish defenders under King Frederick III successfully repelled the forces of the Swedish Empire. Painting by Frederik Christian Lund.

Seeing an opportunity to tear up the Treaty of Brømsebro, King Frederick III of Denmark, in 1657, declared war on Sweden, the latter being deeply involved in the Second Northern War (1655–1660), and marched on Bremen-Verden. This led to a massive Danish defeat as the armies of King Charles X Gustav of Sweden conquered Jutland and, following the Swedish March across the frozen Danish Straits, occupied Funen and much of Zealand before signing the Peace of Roskilde in February 1658, which gave Sweden control of Scania, Blekinge, Bohuslän, Trøndelag, and the island of Bornholm. Charles X Gustav quickly regretted not having ruined Denmark and in August 1658, he launched a second attack on Denmark, conquered most of the Danish islands, and began a two-year-long siege of Copenhagen. King Frederick III actively led the defence of the city, rallying its citizens to take up arms, and repelled the Swedish attacks. The siege ended following the death of Charles X Gustav in 1660. In the ensuing peace settlement, Denmark managed to maintain its independence and regain control of Trøndelag and Bornholm. Attaining great popularity following the war, Frederick III used this to disband the elective monarchy in favour of absolute monarchy, which lasted until 1848 in Denmark.

Denmark tried but failed to regain control of Scania in the Scanian War (1675–1679). After the Great Northern War (1700–21), Denmark managed to regain control of the parts of Schleswig and Holstein ruled by the house of Holstein-Gottorp in the 1720 Treaty of Frederiksborg and the 1773 Treaty of Tsarskoye Selo, respectively. Denmark prospered greatly in the last decades of the 18th century due to its neutral status allowing it to trade with both sides in the many contemporary wars. In the Napoleonic Wars, Denmark traded with both France and the United Kingdom and joined the League of Armed Neutrality with Russia, Sweden, and Prussia. British fears that Denmark-Norway would ally with France led to two attacks against Danish targets in Copenhagen in 1801 and 1807. These attacks resulted in the British capturing most of the Dano-Norwegian navy and led to the outbreak of the Gunboat War. In 1807 much of Copenhagen was burned down as a result of these bombardments, including Vor Frue Kirke, the main Danish cathedral. British control of the waterways between Denmark and Norway proved disastrous to the union's economy and in 1813 Denmark–Norway went bankrupt.

The union was dissolved by the Treaty of Kiel in 1814; the Danish monarchy "irrevocably and forever" renounced claims to the Kingdom of Norway in favour of the Swedish king. Denmark kept the possessions of Iceland (which retained the Danish monarchy until 1944), the Faroe Islands and Greenland, all of which had been governed by Norway for centuries. Apart from the Nordic colonies, Denmark continued to rule over Danish India from 1620 to 1869, the Danish Gold Coast (Ghana) from 1658 to 1850, and the Danish West Indies from 1671 to 1917.

=== Constitutional monarchy (1849–present) ===
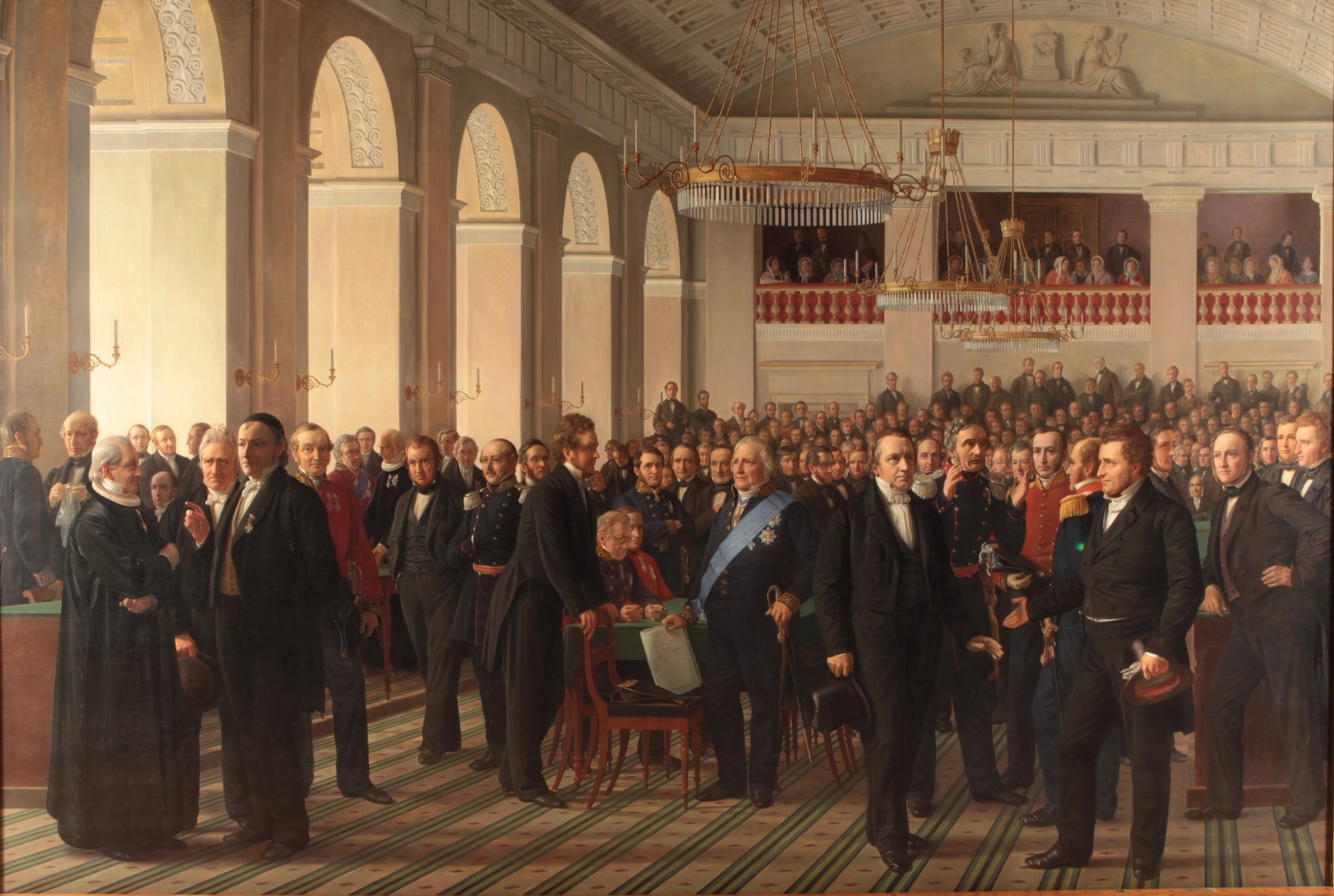
The National Constitutional Assembly was convened by King Frederick VII in 1848 to adopt the Constitution of Denmark.

A nascent Danish liberal and national movement gained momentum in the 1830s; after the European Revolutions of 1848, Denmark peacefully became a constitutional monarchy on 5 June 1849. A new constitution established a two-chamber parliament. Denmark faced war against both Prussia and the Austrian Empire in what became known as the Second Schleswig War, lasting from February to October 1864. Denmark was defeated and obliged to cede Schleswig and Holstein to Prussia. This loss came as the latest in the long series of defeats and territorial losses that had begun in the 17th century. After these events, Denmark pursued a policy of neutrality in Europe.

Industrialisation came to Denmark in the second half of the 19th century. The nation's first railways were constructed in the 1850s, and improved communications and overseas trade allowed industry to develop in spite of Denmark's lack of natural resources. Trade unions developed, starting in the 1870s. There was a considerable migration of people from the countryside to the cities, and Danish agriculture became centred on the export of dairy and meat products.

Denmark maintained its neutral stance during World War I. After the defeat of Germany, the Versailles powers offered to return the region of Schleswig-Holstein to Denmark. Fearing German irredentism, Denmark refused to consider the return of the area without a plebiscite; the two Schleswig Plebiscites took place on 10 February and 14 March 1920, respectively. On 10 July 1920, Northern Schleswig was recovered by Denmark, thereby adding some 163,600 inhabitants and 3,984 square kilometres (1,538 sq mi). The country's first social democratic government took office in 1924.

In 1939, Denmark signed a 10-year nonaggression pact with Nazi Germany. However, Germany invaded Denmark on 9 April 1940, and the Danish government quickly surrendered. Because roughly 10% of the German army's food supply depended on Danish agriculture, the occupation remained relatively cooperative compared to other European nations to ensure continued output. World War II in Denmark was characterised by economic co-operation with Germany until 1943, when the Danish government refused further co-operation and its navy scuttled most of its ships and sent many of its officers to Sweden, which was neutral. At that point the government fell. The Danish resistance performed a rescue operation that managed to evacuate several thousand Jews and their families to safety in Sweden before the Germans could send them to death camps. Some Danes supported Nazism by joining the Danish Nazi Party or volunteering to fight with Germany as part of the Frikorps Danmark. Iceland severed ties with Denmark and became an independent republic in 1944; Germany surrendered in May 1945. In 1948, the Faroe Islands gained home rule. In 1949, Denmark became a founding member of NATO.

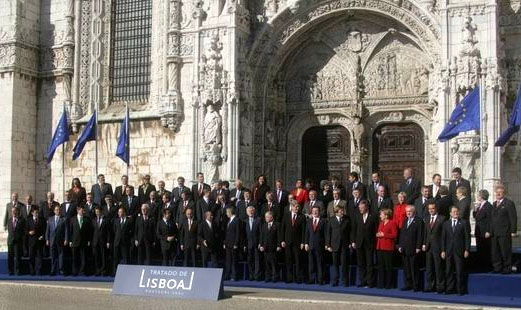
Denmark became a member of the European Union in 1973 and signed the Lisbon Treaty in 2007.

Denmark was a founding member of the European Free Trade Association (EFTA). During the 1960s, the EFTA countries were often referred to as the Outer Seven, as opposed to the Inner Six of what was then the European Economic Community (EEC). In 1973, along with Britain and Ireland, Denmark joined the European Economic Community (now the European Union) after a public referendum. The Maastricht Treaty, which involved further European integration, was rejected by the Danish people in 1992; it was only accepted after a second referendum in 1993, which provided for four opt-outs from policies. The Danes rejected the euro as the national currency in a referendum in 2000. Greenland gained home rule in 1979 and was awarded self-determination in 2009. Neither the Faroe Islands nor Greenland are members of the European Union, the Faroese having declined membership of the EEC in 1973 and Greenland in 1986, in both cases because of fisheries policies.

Constitutional change in 1953 led to a single-chamber parliament elected by proportional representation, female accession to the Danish throne, and Greenland becoming an integral part of Denmark. The centre-left Social Democrats led a string of coalition governments for most of the second half of the 20th century, introducing the Nordic welfare model. The Liberal Party and the Conservative People's Party have also led centre-right governments.

Since 2025 the Danish territory of Greenland has been the target of US hybrid warfare under Donald Trump. Mette Frederiksen said that "the Kingdom of Denmark—and thus Greenland—is a member of NATO and is therefore covered by the Alliance's collective security guarantee [...] I [...] strongly urge the United States to cease its threats against a historically close ally."

== Geography ==
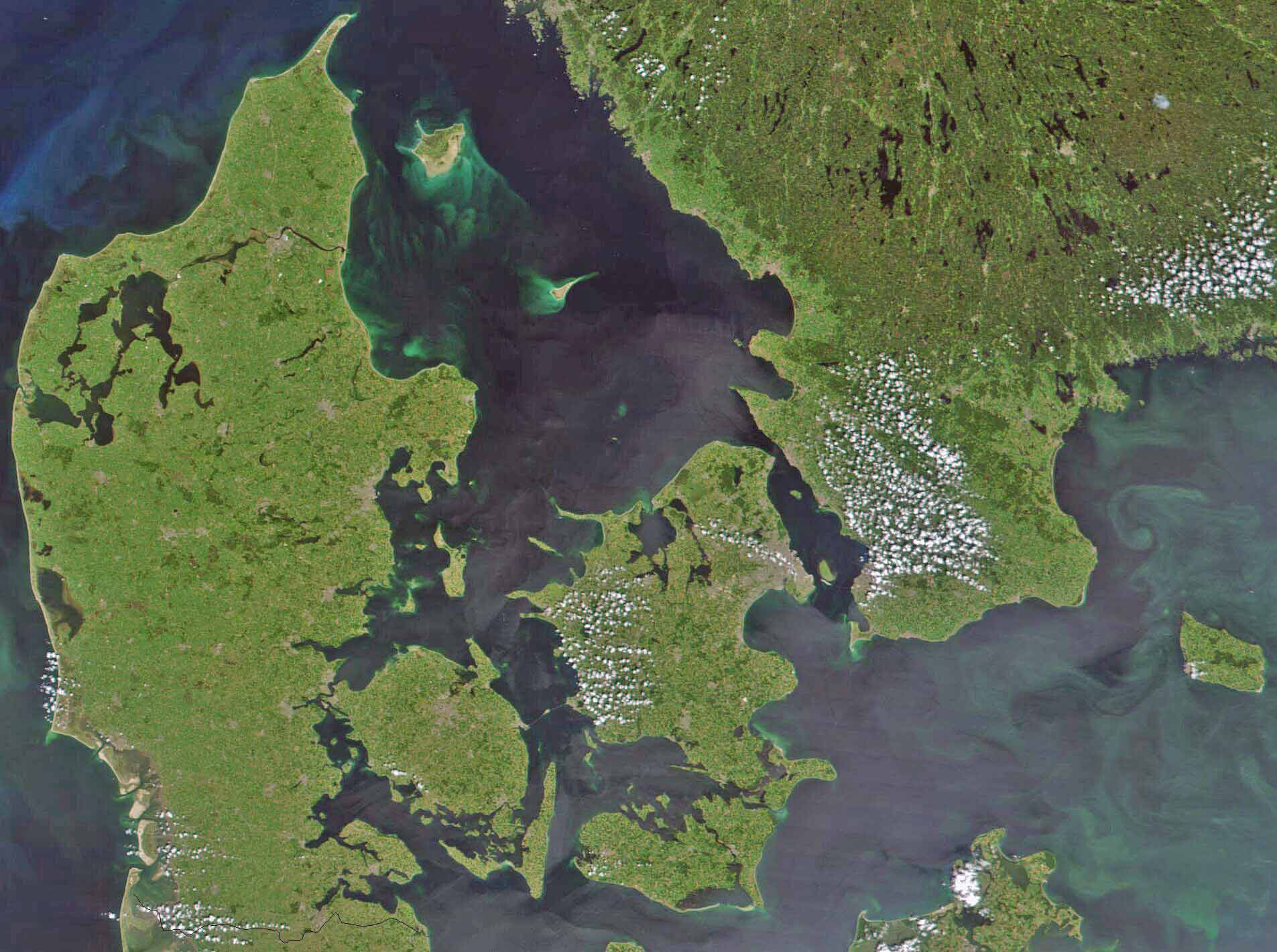
A satellite image of Jutland and the Danish islands

Located in Northern Europe, north of Edmonton, Denmark consists of the northern part of the Jutland peninsula and an archipelago of 406 islands. Of these, the largest island is Zealand, on which the capital Copenhagen is situated, followed by the North Jutlandic Island, Funen, and Lolland. Some of the larger islands are connected by bridges; a bridge-tunnel across the Øresund connects Zealand with Sweden; the Great Belt Fixed Link connects Funen with Zealand; and the Little Belt Bridge connects Jutland with Funen. The four largest cities are Copenhagen on Zealand; Aarhus and Aalborg in Jutland; and Odense on Funen.

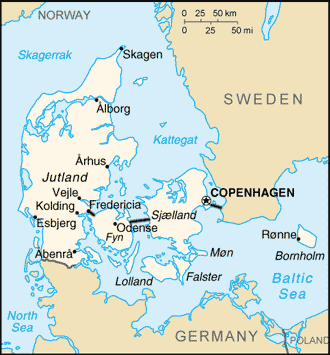
A map showing major urban areas, islands and some of the connecting bridges

The metropolitan part occupies a total area of 42,957 square kilometres (16,586 sq mi). The area of inland water is 600 km^{2} (232 sq mi). Post-glacial rebound raises the land by a bit less than 1 cm (0.4 in) a year in the north and east, extending the coast. It shares a border of 68 kilometres (42 mi) with Germany to the south. Denmark's waters total 105,000 square kilometres (40,541 square miles).

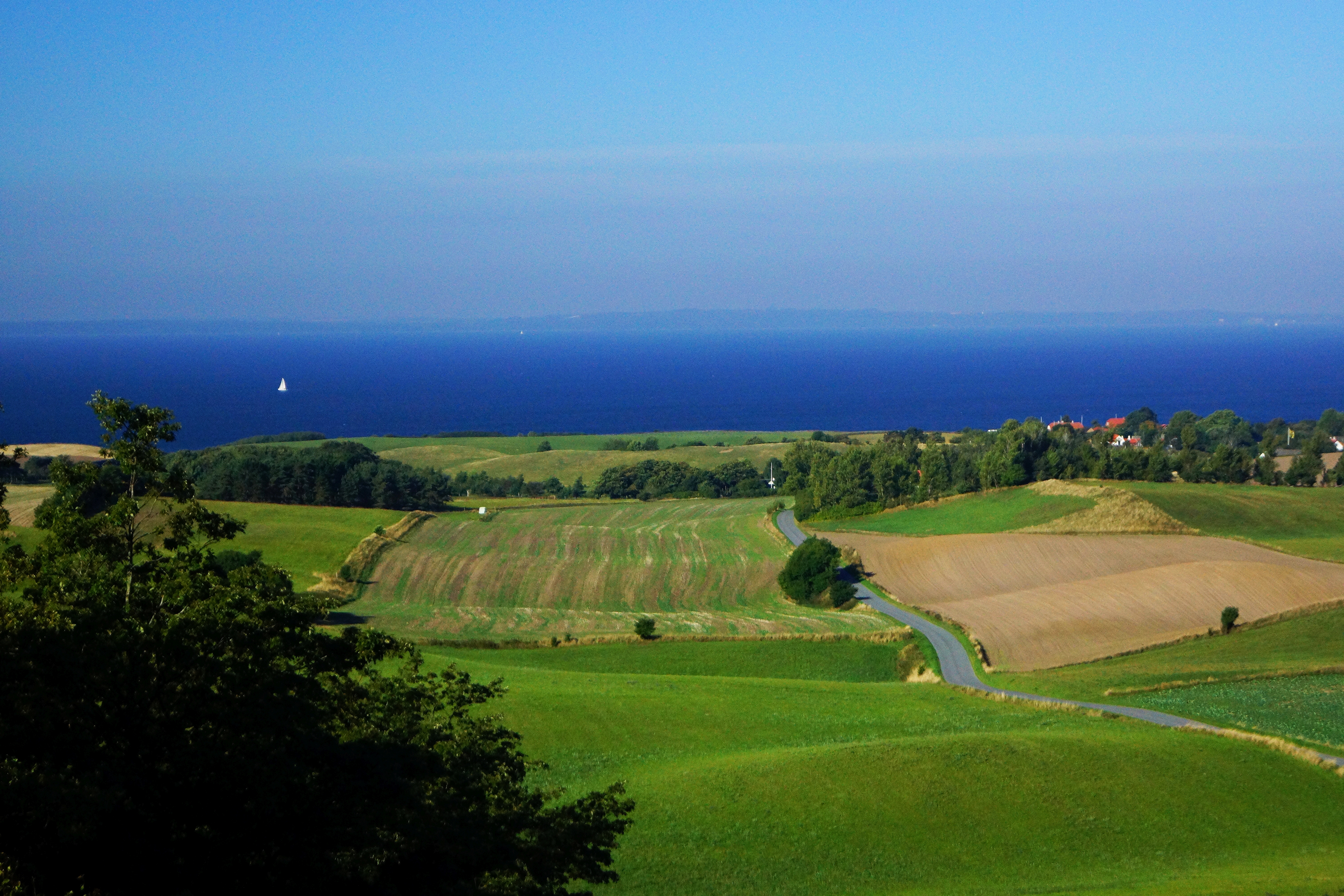
Bay of Aarhus viewed from southern Djursland

The highest natural point is Møllehøj, at 170.89 metres (560.66 ft). Lammefjorden, around −7 m (−23 ft) (near Audebo), is the lowest point. A sizeable portion of Denmark's terrain consists of rolling plains. Although once extensively forested, today Denmark largely consists of arable land. It is drained by a dozen or so streams, and the most significant include the Gudenå, Odense, Skjern, Suså and Vidå—a stream that flows along its southern border with Germany. Lake Arresø, located northwest of Copenhagen, is the largest lake.

The Kingdom of Denmark includes two overseas territories, both well to the west of Denmark: Greenland, the world's largest island, and the Faroe Islands in the North Atlantic Ocean. These territories are self-governing under their own parliaments (the Inatsisartut and Løgting) and form part of the Danish Realm.

=== Climate ===
Denmark has a temperate climate with a Köppen climate classification of Cfa, characterised by cool to cold winters, with mean temperatures in January of 1.1 °C (34.0 °F). It has mild summers, with a mean temperature in July of 16.5 °C (61.7 °F). The most extreme temperatures recorded in Denmark since 1874 were 37.0 °C (98.6 °F) in 2026 and −31.2 °C (−24.2 °F) in 1982. Denmark has an average of 200 days per year with precipitation, on average receiving a total of 791 millimetres (31 in) per year; autumn is the wettest season and spring the driest. The position between a continent and an ocean means that the weather is often unstable.

Because of Denmark's northern location, there are large seasonal variations in daylight. Days are short during the winter with a sunrise around 8:45 am and sunset 3:45 pm (standard time), as well as long summer days with sunrise at 4:30 am and sunset at 10 pm (daylight saving time).

=== Ecology and environment ===
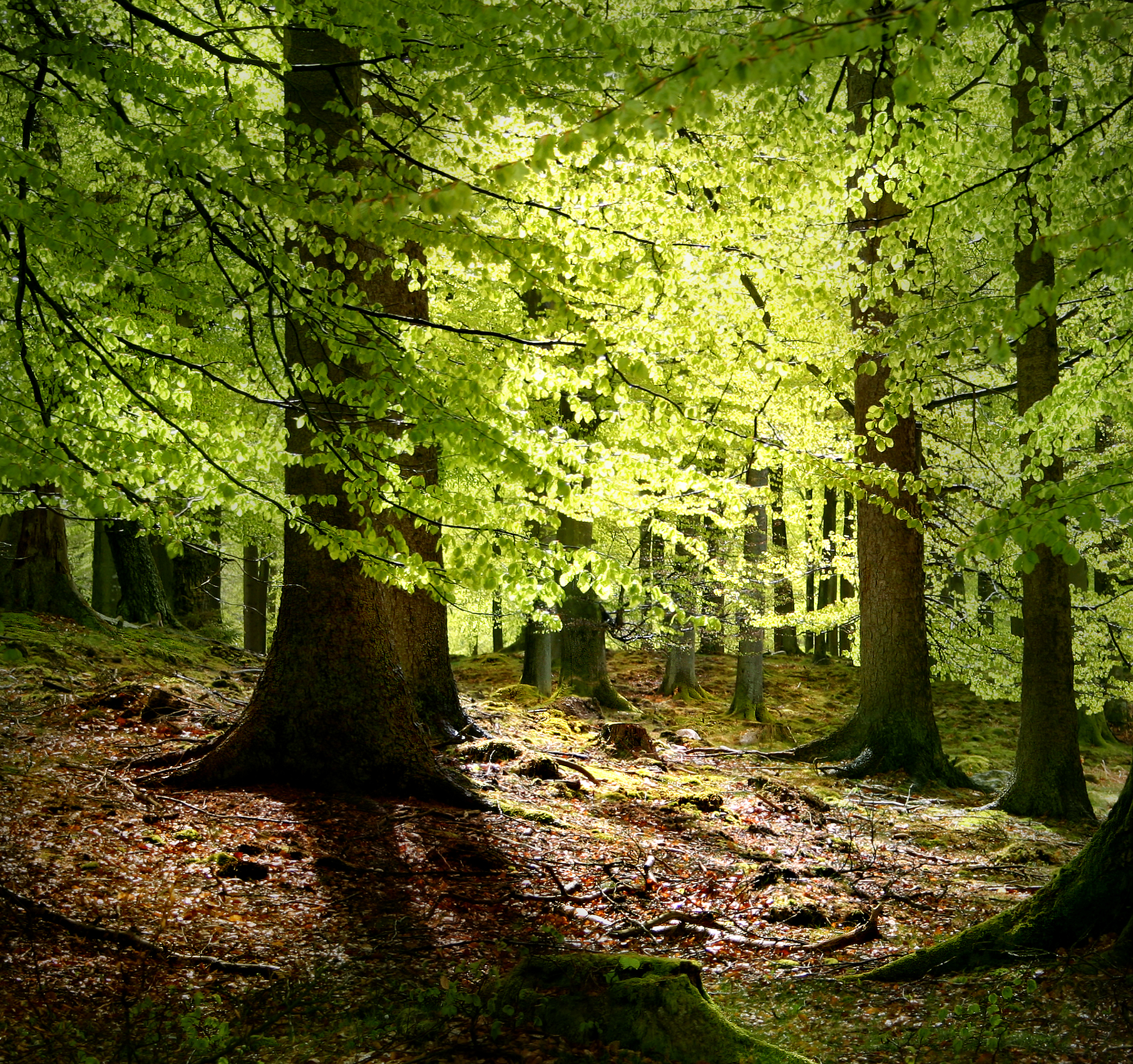
Beech trees are common throughout Denmark, especially in the sparse woodlands.

Denmark belongs to the Boreal Kingdom and can be subdivided into two ecoregions, the Atlantic and Baltic mixed forests. Almost all of Denmark's primeval temperate forests have been destroyed or fragmented, chiefly for agricultural purposes during the last millennia. The deforestation has created large swaths of heathland and devastating sand drifts. In spite of this, there are several larger second growth woodlands in the country and, in total, 12.9% of the land is now forested. Norway spruce is the most common forest tree.

Roe deer and the large-antlered red deer can be found in Denmark, along with smaller mammals, such as polecats, hares, and hedgehogs, and approximately 400 bird species. Large marine mammals include healthy populations of harbour porpoises, pinnipeds, and occasional visits of whales, including blue whales and orcas. Cod, herring and plaice are abundant culinary fish in Danish waters and form the basis for a large fishing industry.

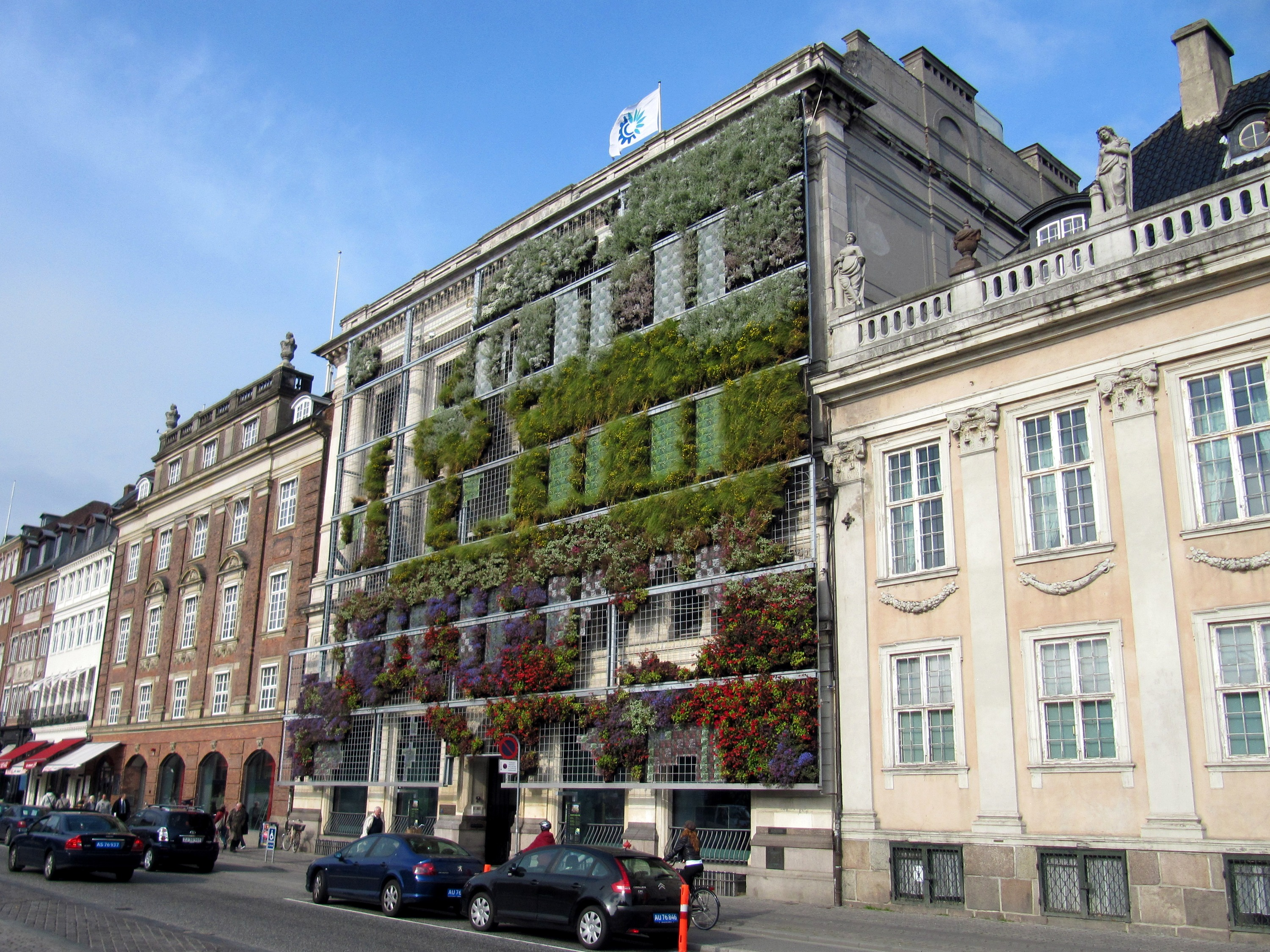
The European Environment Agency in Copenhagen

Denmark has historically taken a progressive stance on environmental preservation, establishing a Ministry of Environment in 1971, and implementing an environmental law in 1973. Air and water pollution are two of Denmark's most significant environmental issues, although much of its household and industrial waste is now increasingly filtered and sometimes recycled. Denmark is a signatory to the Climate Change-Kyoto Protocol to reduce greenhouse gas emissions. However, its national ecological footprint in 2025 was 7.5 global hectares per person, which is very high compared to a world average of 2.6 in 2024.

Notwithstanding its relatively high emissions, Denmark topped the list of the 2015 Climate Change Performance Index due to its implementation of effective climate protection policies. Denmark ranked 10th in the Environmental Performance Index, which measures progress at mitigating climate change. In 2021, Denmark joined Costa Rica to start the "Beyond Oil and Gas alliance" for stopping the use of fossil fuels. The Danish government will stop issuing new licences for oil and gas extraction in 2050.

== Government services and politics ==
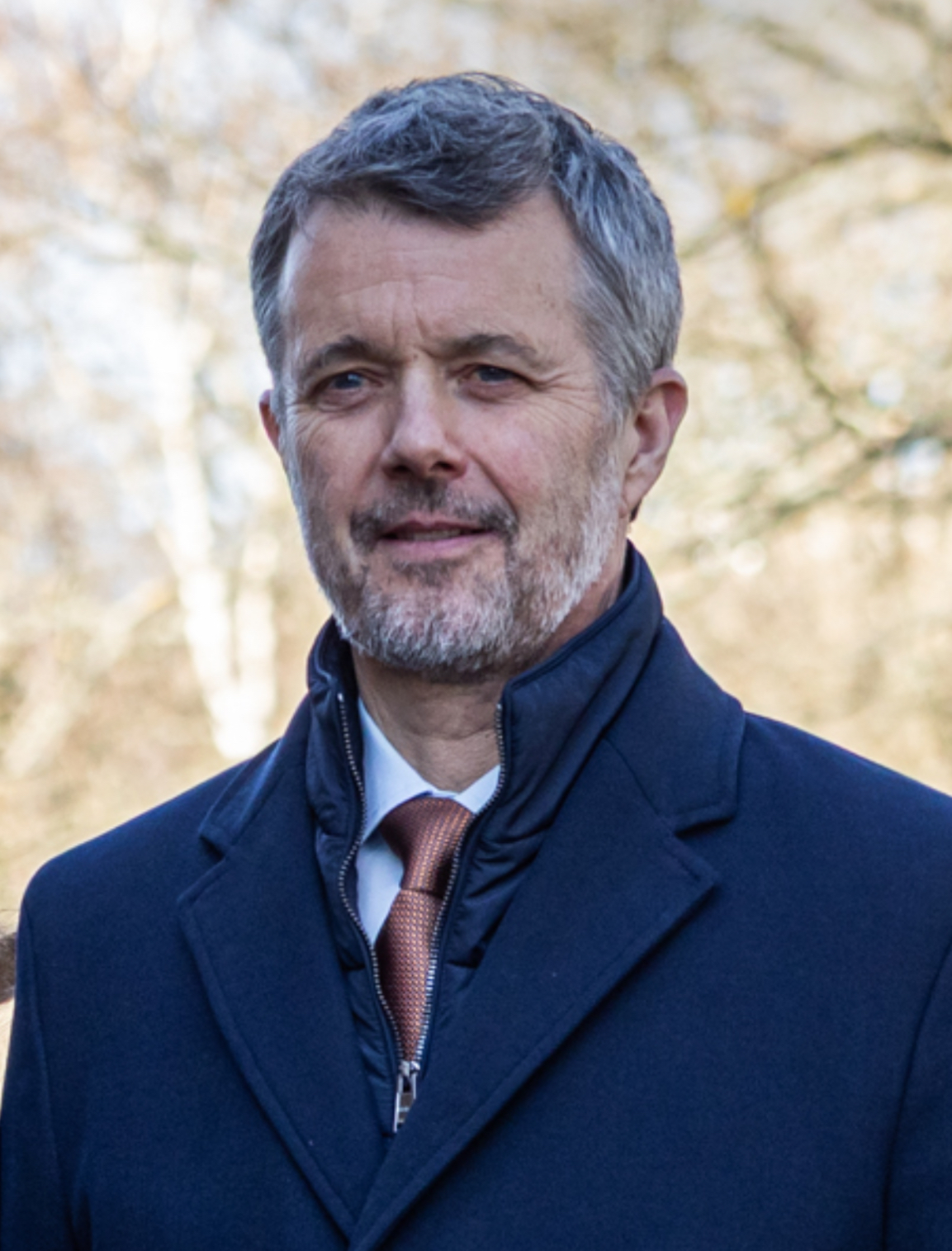
Frederik X
King

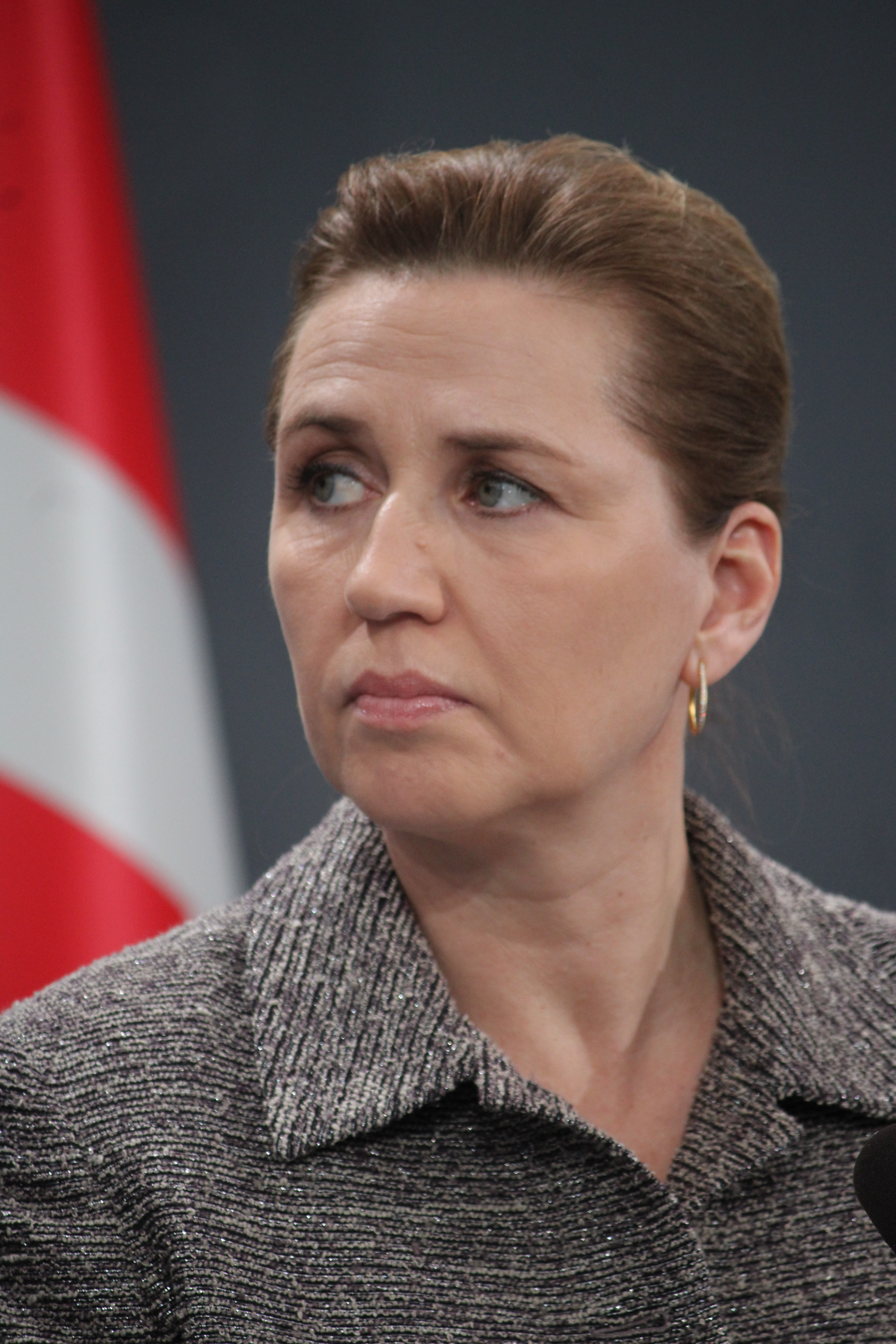
Mette Frederiksen
Prime Minister

Politics in Denmark operate under a framework laid out in the Constitution of Denmark. (Note: Denmark has a codified constitution. Changes to it require an absolute majority in two consecutive parliamentary terms and the approval of at least 40% of the electorate through a referendum.) First written in 1849, it establishes a sovereign state in the form of a constitutional monarchy, with a representative unicameral parliamentary system. The monarch officially retains executive power and presides over the Council of State (privy council). In practice, the duties of the monarch are strictly representative and ceremonial, (Note: The Constitution refers to "the King" (Danish: kongen), rather than the gender-neutral term "monarch". In light of the restriction of powers of the monarchy, this is best interpreted as referring to the government Cabinet.) such as the formal appointment and dismissal of the Prime Minister and other Government ministers. The monarch is not answerable for their actions, and their person is sacrosanct. Hereditary monarch King Frederik X has been head of state since 14 January 2024.

The Danish political system, which emphasises broad consensus, is used by American political scientist Francis Fukuyama as a reference point for near-perfect governance; his phrase "getting to Denmark" refers to the country's status as a global model for stable social and political institutions.

=== Government ===
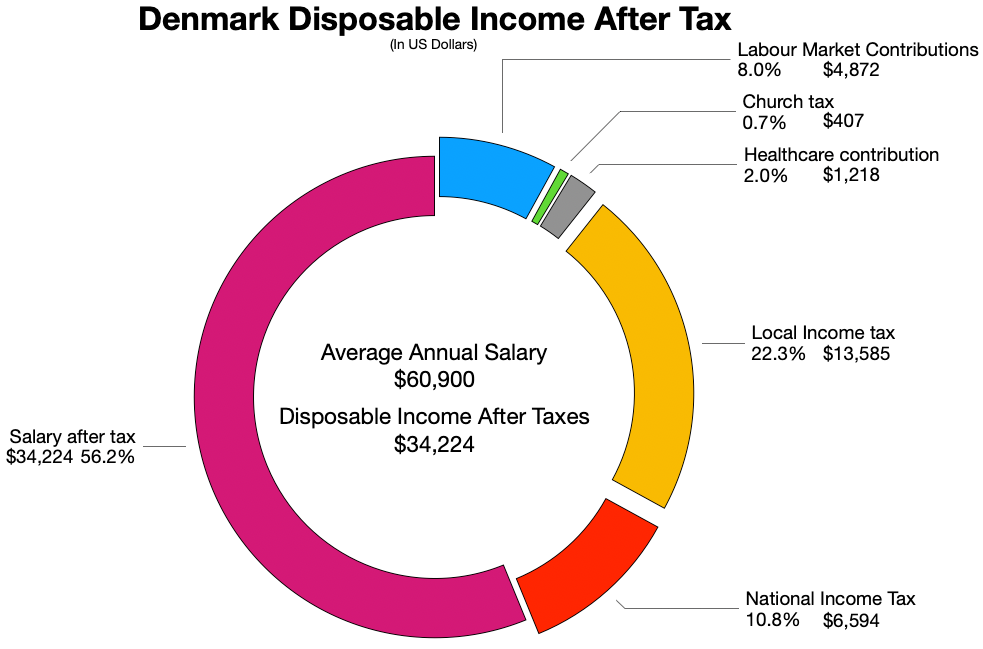
Denmark disposable income after tax, not including Value-added tax or Property tax

The Danish parliament is unicameral and called the Folketing (Danish: Folketinget). It is the legislature of the Kingdom of Denmark, passing acts that apply in Denmark and, variably, Greenland and the Faroe Islands. The Folketing is also responsible for adopting the state's budgets, approving the state's accounts, appointing and exercising control of the government, and taking part in international co-operation. Bills may be initiated by the government or by members of parliament. All bills passed must be presented before the Council of State to receive Royal Assent within thirty days in order to become law.

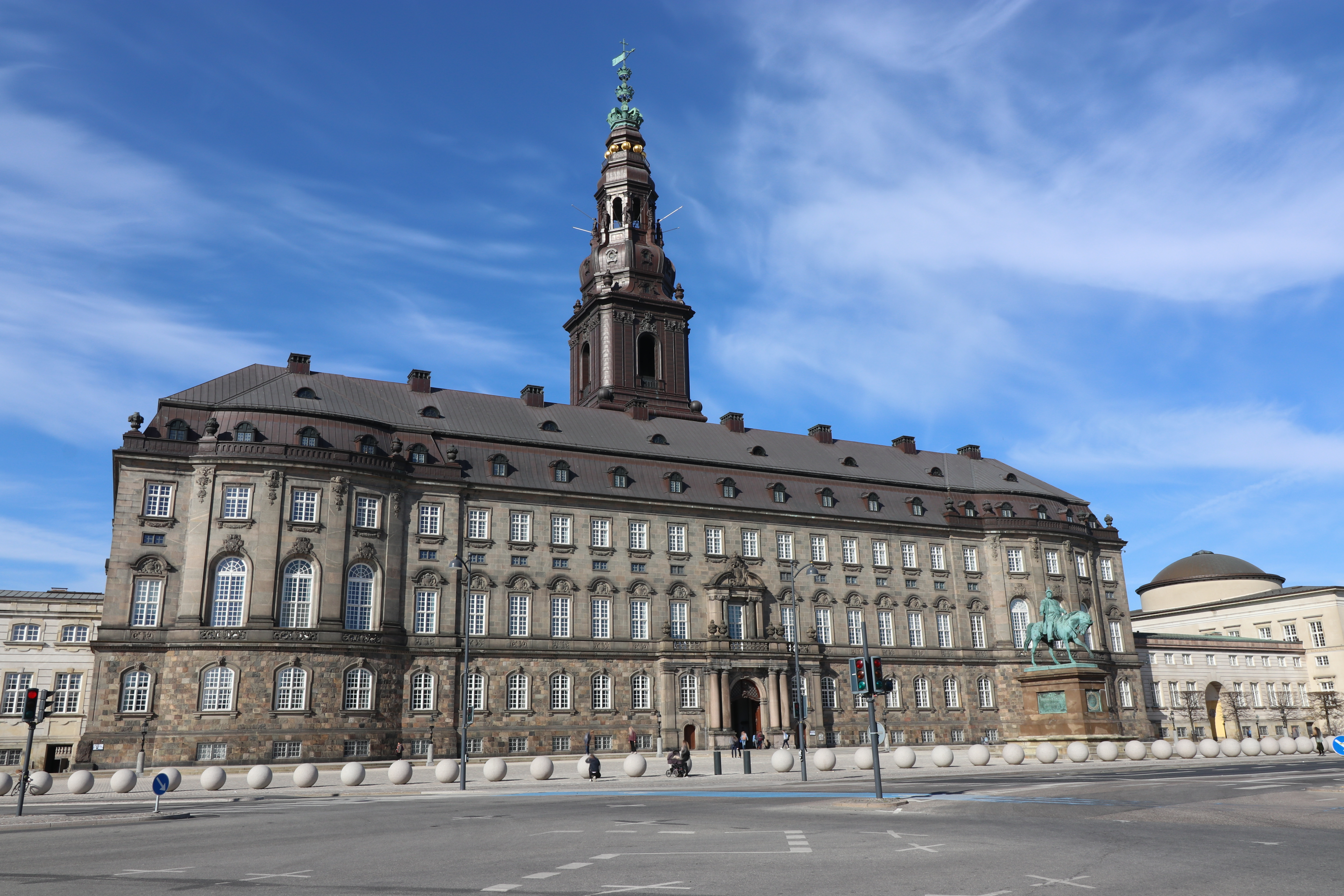
Christiansborg Palace houses the Folketing, the Supreme Court, and government offices.

Denmark is a representative democracy with universal suffrage. (Note: The Economist Intelligence Unit, while acknowledging that democracy is difficult to measure, listed Denmark 5th on its index of democracy.) Membership of the Folketing is based on proportional representation of political parties, with a 2% electoral threshold. Denmark elects 175 members to the Folketing, with Greenland and the Faroe Islands electing an additional two members each—179 members in total. Parliamentary elections are held at least every four years, but it is within the powers of the prime minister to ask the monarch to call for an election before the term has elapsed. In a vote of no confidence, the Folketing may force a single minister or an entire government to resign.

The Government of Denmark operates as a cabinet government, where executive authority is exercised—formally, on behalf of the monarch—by the prime minister and other cabinet ministers, who head ministries. As the executive branch, the Cabinet is responsible for proposing bills and a budget, executing the laws, and guiding the foreign and internal policies of Denmark. The monarch usually, but not necessarily, requests the person most likely to command the confidence majority in the Folketing to become prime minister; this is often the current leader of the largest political party or, more effectively, through a coalition of parties. A single party generally does not have sufficient political power in terms of the number of seats to form a cabinet on its own; Denmark has often been ruled by coalition governments, themselves usually minority governments dependent on non-government parties.

Following the 2026 Danish general election in March 2026, incumbent prime minister and Social Democratic leader Mette Frederiksen in June 2026 formed the current Frederiksen III Cabinet, a coalition government with Green Left, Moderate party, and Social Liberal.

=== Law and judicial system ===
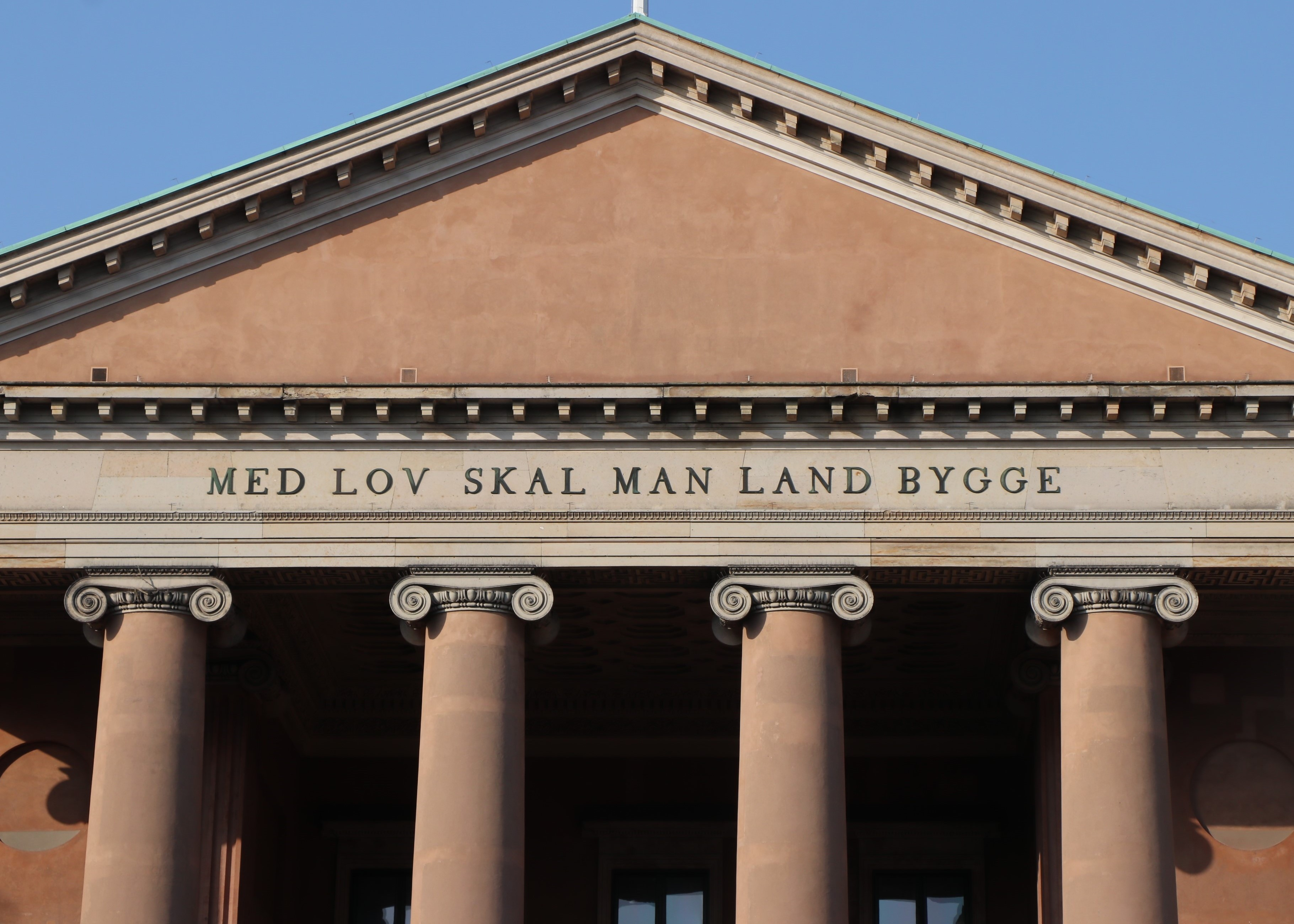
"With law shall land be built", preamble to the Code of Jutland above Copenhagen Court House. In 2023, the World Justice Project ranked Denmark no. 1 on their rule of law index.

Denmark has a civil law system with some references to Germanic law. Denmark resembles Norway and Sweden in never having developed a case-law like that of England and the United States nor comprehensive codes like those of France and Germany. Much of its law is customary.

The judicial system of Denmark is divided between courts with regular civil and criminal jurisdiction and administrative courts with jurisdiction over litigation between individuals and the public administration. Articles 62 and 64 of the Constitution (grundloven) ensure judicial independence from government and Parliament by providing that judges shall only be guided by the law, including acts, statutes and practice. The Kingdom of Denmark does not have a single unified judicial system – Denmark has one system, Greenland another, and the Faroe Islands a third. However, decisions by the highest courts in Greenland and the Faroe Islands may be appealed to the Danish High Courts. The Danish Supreme Court is the highest civil and criminal court responsible for the administration of justice in the Kingdom.

=== Danish Realm ===
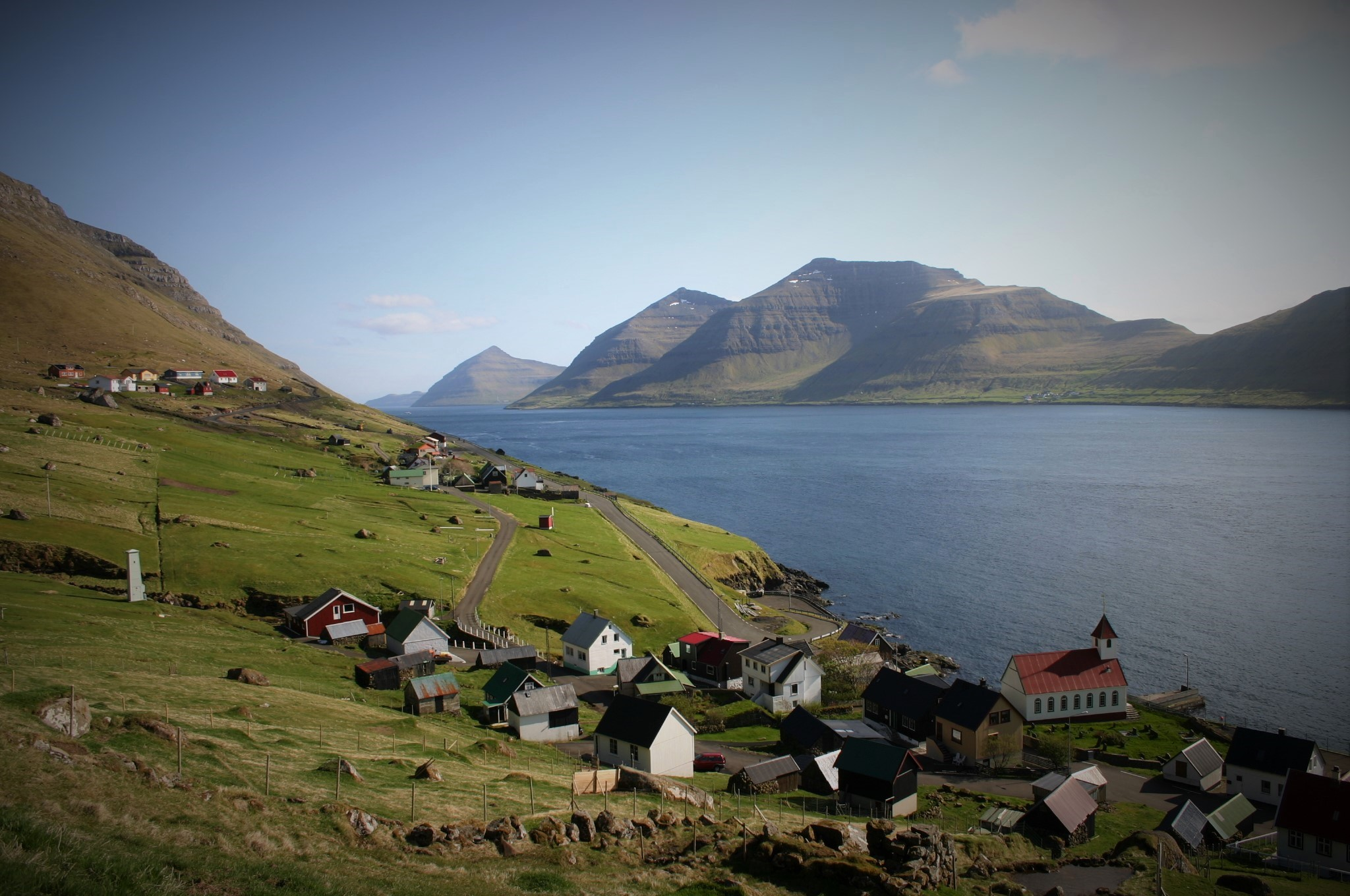
The village of Kunoy on Kunoy island, in the Faroe Islands. Kalsoy island is at right

The Kingdom of Denmark is a unitary state that comprises, in addition to metropolitan Denmark, two autonomous territories in the North Atlantic Ocean: the Faroe Islands and Greenland. They have been integrated parts of the Danish Realm since the 18th century; however, due to their separate historical and cultural identities, these parts of the Realm have extensive political powers and have assumed legislative and administrative responsibility in a substantial number of fields. Home rule was granted to the Faroe Islands in 1948 and to Greenland in 1979, each having previously had the status of counties.

The Faroe Islands and Greenland have their own home governments and parliaments and are effectively self-governing in regards to domestic affairs apart from the judicial system and monetary policy. High Commissioners (Rigsombudsmand) act as representatives of the Danish government in the Faroese Løgting and in the Greenlandic Parliament, but they cannot vote. The Faroese home government is defined to be an equal partner with the Danish national government, while the Greenlandic people are defined as a separate people with the right to self-determination.

Autonomous territory	Population (2020)	Total area	Capital	Local parliament	Premier
Faroe Islands (Færøerne, Føroyar)	52,110	1,399 km^{2} (540.16 sq mi)	Tórshavn	Løgting	Aksel V. Johannesen
Greenland (Grønland, Kalaallit Nunaat)	56,081	2,166,086 km^{2} (836,330 sq mi)	Nuuk	Inatsisartut	Múte Bourup Egede

=== Administrative divisions ===

Denmark, with a total area of 43,094 square kilometres (16,639 sq mi), is divided into five administrative regions (Danish: regioner). The regions are further subdivided into 98 municipalities (kommuner). The easternmost land in Denmark, the Ertholmene archipelago, with an area of 39 hectares (0.16 sq mi), is neither part of a municipality nor a region but belongs to the Ministry of Defence. The provinces of Denmark are statistical divisions of Denmark, positioned between the administrative regions and municipalities. They are not administrative divisions, nor subject for any kind of political elections, but are mainly for statistical use.

The regions were created on 1 January 2007 to replace the 16 former counties. At the same time, smaller municipalities were merged into larger units, reducing the number from 271 to 98. Most municipalities have a population of at least 20,000 to give them financial and professional sustainability, although a few exceptions were made to this rule. The administrative divisions are led by directly elected councils, elected proportionally every four years; the most recent Danish local elections were held on 18 November 2025. Other regional structures use the municipal boundaries as a layout, including the police districts, the court districts and the electoral wards.

==== Regions ====
The governing bodies of the regions are the regional councils, each with forty-one councillors elected for four-year terms. The councils are headed by regional district chairmen (regionsrådsformand), who are elected by the council. The areas of responsibility for the regional councils are the national health service, social services and regional development. Unlike the counties they replaced, the regions are not allowed to levy taxes and the health service is partly financed by a national health care contribution until 2018 (sundhedsbidrag), partly by funds from both government and municipalities. On 1 January 2019 this contribution was abolished and replaced by higher income tax instead.

The area and populations of the regions vary widely; for example, the Capital Region has a population three times larger than that of North Denmark Region. Under the county system certain densely populated municipalities, such as Copenhagen Municipality and Frederiksberg, had been given a status equivalent to that of counties, making them first-level administrative divisions. These sui generis municipalities were incorporated into the new regions under the 2007 reforms.

On 1 January 2027, the Capital Region and Region Zealand will be merged to form the Region of Eastern Denmark.

Danish name	English name	Admin. centre	Largest city (populous)	Population (July 2026)	Total area (km^{2})
Hovedstaden	Capital Region of Denmark	Hillerød	Copenhagen	1,949,336	2,568.29
Midtjylland	Central Denmark Region	Viborg	Aarhus	1,385,488	13,095.80
Nordjylland	North Denmark Region	Aalborg	Aalborg	593,299	7,907.09
Sjælland	Region Zealand	Sorø	Roskilde	859,458	7,268.75
Syddanmark	Region of Southern Denmark	Vejle	Odense	1,244,118	12,132.21
Source: Regional and municipal key figures

=== Foreign relations ===
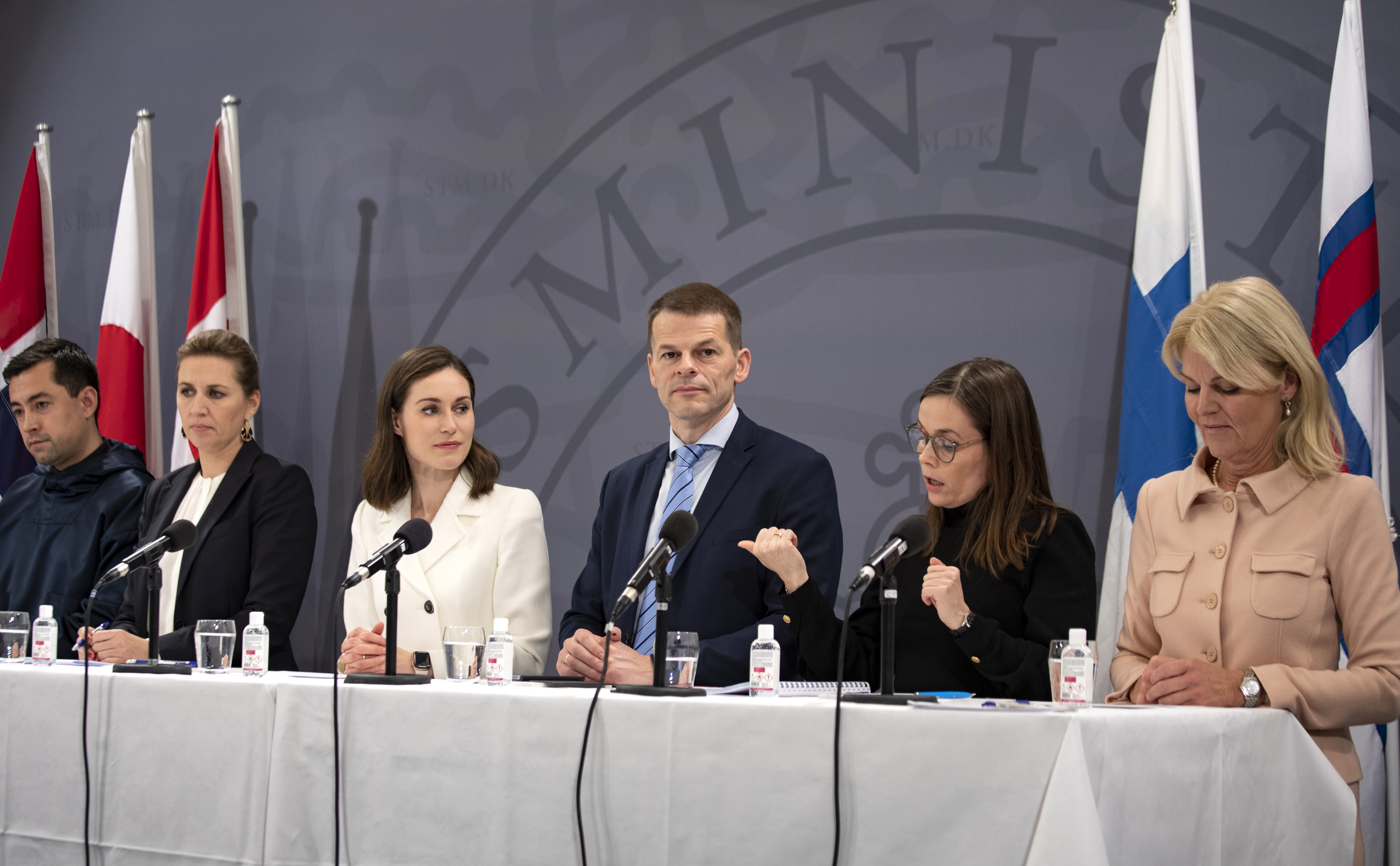
Danish prime minister Mette Frederiksen (second from left) with foreign counterparts at the Nordic Council in Copenhagen, 2021

Denmark wields considerable influence in Northern Europe and is a middle power in international affairs. In recent years, Greenland and the Faroe Islands have been guaranteed a say in foreign policy issues such as fishing, whaling, and geopolitical concerns. The foreign policy of Denmark is substantially influenced by its membership of the European Union (EU); Denmark including Greenland joined the European Economic Community (EEC), the EU's predecessor, in 1973. (Note: The Faroese declined membership in 1973; Greenland chose to leave the EEC in 1985, following a referendum.) Denmark held the Presidency of the Council of the European Union on seven occasions, most recently from January to June 2012. Following World War II, Denmark ended its two-hundred-year-long policy of neutrality. It has been a founding member of the North Atlantic Treaty Organization (NATO) since 1949, and membership remains highly popular.

As a member of Development Assistance Committee (DAC), Denmark has for a long time been among the countries of the world contributing the largest percentage of gross national income to development aid. In 2015, Denmark contributed 0.85% of its gross national income (GNI) to foreign aid and was one of only six countries meeting the longstanding UN target of 0.7% of GNI. (Note: As measured in official development assistance (ODA). Denmark, Luxembourg, the Netherlands, Norway, Sweden and the United Kingdom exceeded the United Nations' ODA target of 0.7% of GNI.) The country participates in both bilateral and multilateral aid, with the aid usually administered by the Ministry of Foreign Affairs. The organisational name of Danish International Development Agency (DANIDA) is often used, in particular when operating bilateral aid. According to the 2024 Global Peace Index, Denmark is the 8th most peaceful country in the world.

=== Military ===
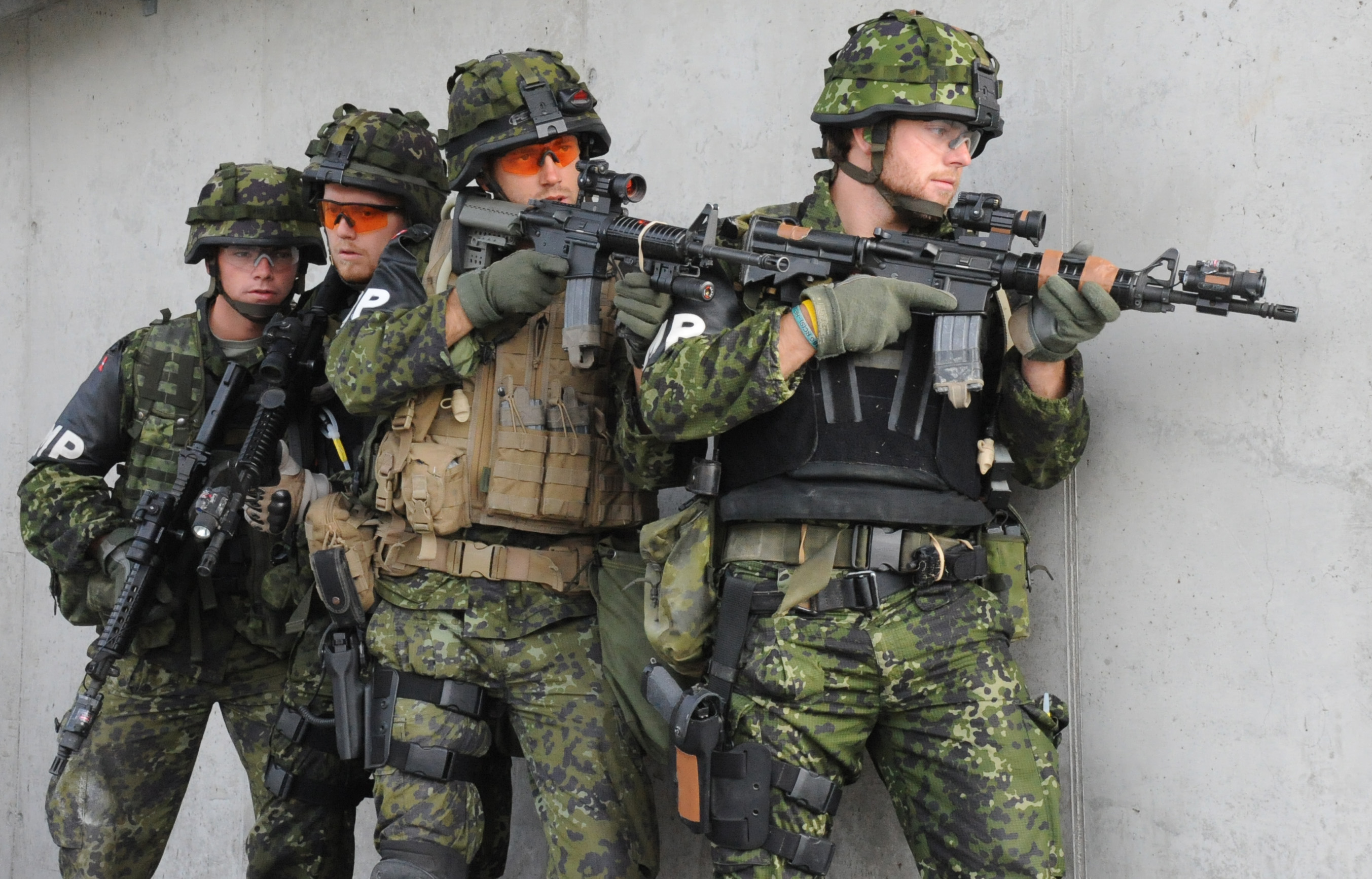
Danish Military Police conducting advanced law-enforcement training

Denmark's armed forces are known as the Danish Defence (Danish: Forsvaret). The Minister of Defence is commander-in-chief of the Danish Defence, and serves as chief diplomatic official abroad. During peacetime, the Ministry of Defence employs around 33,000 people in total. The main military branches employ almost 27,000: 15,460 in the Royal Danish Army, 5,300 in the Royal Danish Navy and 6,050 in the Royal Danish Air Force (all including conscripts). The Danish Emergency Management Agency employs 2,000 (including conscripts), and about 4,000 are in non-branch-specific services like the Danish Defence Command and the Danish Defence Intelligence Service. Furthermore, around 44,500 serve as volunteers in the Danish Home Guard.

Denmark is a long-time supporter of international peacekeeping, but since the NATO bombing of Yugoslavia in 1999 and the War in Afghanistan in 2001, Denmark has also found a new role as a warring nation, participating actively in several wars and invasions. This relatively new situation has stirred some internal critique, but the Danish population has generally been very supportive, in particular of the War in Afghanistan. The Danish Defence has around 1,400 staff in international missions, not including standing contributions to NATO SNMCMG1. Danish forces were heavily engaged in the former Yugoslavia in the UN Protection Force (UNPROFOR), with IFOR, and now SFOR. Between 2003 and 2007, there were approximately 450 Danish soldiers in Iraq. Denmark also strongly supported American operations in Afghanistan and has contributed both monetarily and materially to the ISAF. These initiatives are often described by the authorities as part of a new "active foreign policy" of Denmark.

== Economy ==
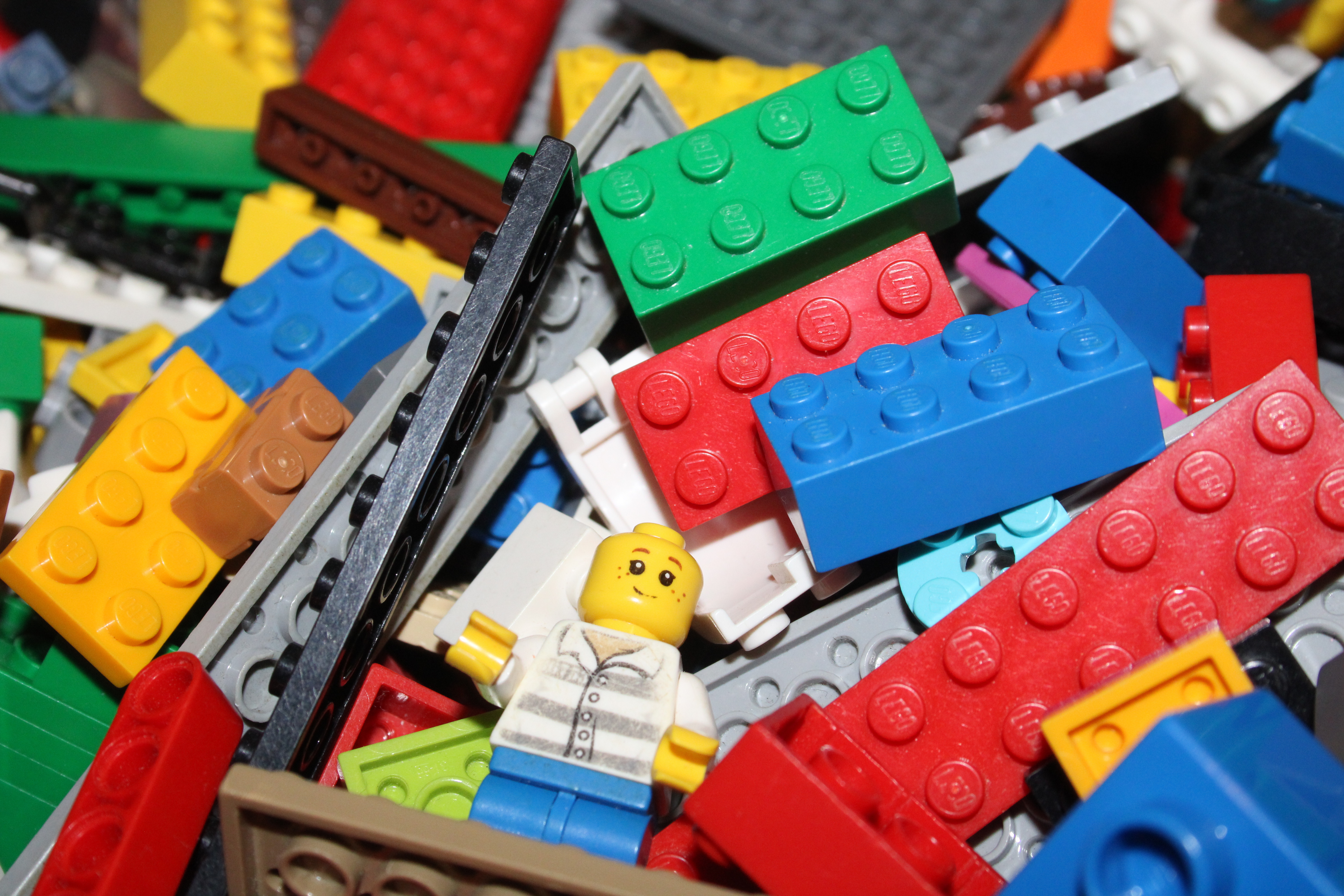
Lego, world's largest toy company by revenue, headquartered in Billund

Denmark has a developed mixed economy that is classed as a high-income economy by the World Bank. In 2022, it ranked 8th in the world in terms of gross national income (PPP) per capita and 10th in nominal GNI per capita. Denmark's economy stands out as one of the most free in the Index of Economic Freedom and the Economic Freedom of the World. It is the 10th most competitive economy in the world, and 7th in Europe and North America, according to the World Economic Forum in its Global Competitiveness Report 2019.

Denmark has the fourth highest ratio of tertiary degree holders in the world. The country ranks highest in the world for workers' rights. GDP per hour worked was the 16th highest in 2022. The country has a market income inequality close to the OECD average, but after taxes and public cash transfers the income inequality is considerably lower. According to Eurostat, Denmark's Gini coefficient for disposable income was the 7th-lowest among EU countries in 2017.

According to the International Monetary Fund, Denmark has the world's highest minimum wage. As Denmark has no minimum wage legislation, the high wage floor has been attributed to the power of trade unions. For example, as the result of a collective bargaining agreement between the 3F trade union and the employers group Horesta, workers at McDonald's and other fast food chains make the equivalent of US$20 an hour, which is more than double what their counterparts earn in the United States, and have access to paid vacation, parental leave and a pension plan. Union density in 2015 was 68%.

Once a predominantly agricultural country on account of its arable landscape, since 1945 Denmark has greatly expanded its industrial base and service sector. By 2017 services contributed circa 75% of GDP, manufacturing about 15% and agriculture less than 2%. Major industries include wind turbines, pharmaceuticals, medical equipment, machinery and transportation equipment, food processing, and construction. Circa 60% of the total export value is due to export of goods, and the remaining 40% is from service exports, mainly sea transport. The country's main export goods are: wind turbines, pharmaceuticals, machinery and instruments, meat and meat products, dairy products, fish, furniture and design. Denmark is a net exporter of food and energy and has for a number of years had a balance of payments surplus which has transformed the country from a net debitor to a net creditor country. By 1 July 2018, the net international investment position (or net foreign assets) of Denmark was equal to 64.6% of GDP.

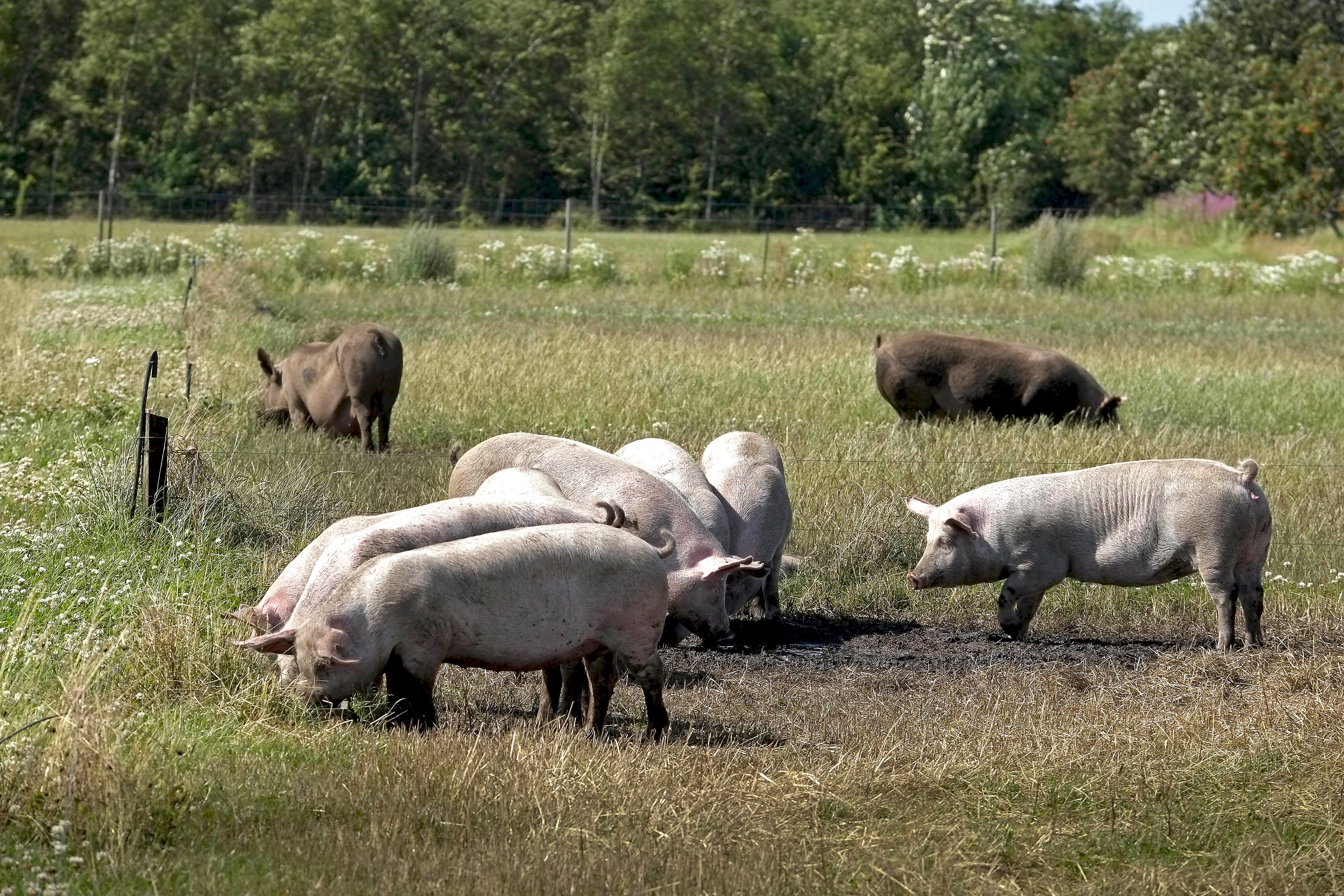
Denmark is a major producer and exporter of pork products.

Denmark is part of the European Union's internal market, which represents more than 508 million consumers. Several domestic commercial policies are determined by agreements among European Union (EU) members and by EU legislation. Support for free trade is high among the Danish public; in a 2016 poll 57% of respondents saw globalisation as an opportunity whereas 18% viewed it as a threat. 70% of trade flows are inside the European Union. As of 2017, Denmark's largest export partners are Germany, Sweden, the United Kingdom, and the United States.

Denmark's currency, the krone (DKK), is pegged at approximately 7.46 kroner per euro through the ERM II. Although a September 2000 referendum rejected adopting the euro, the country follows the policies set forth in the Economic and Monetary Union of the European Union (EMU) and meets the economic convergence criteria needed to adopt the euro. The majority of the political parties in the Folketing support joining the EMU, but since 2010 opinion polls have consistently shown a clear majority against adopting the euro. In March 2018, 29% of respondents from Denmark in a Eurobarometer opinion poll stated that they were in favour of the EMU and the euro, whereas 65% were against it. The exact same poll conducted in November 2023, was almost unchanged with 31% in favour and 63% against.

Ranked by turnover in Denmark, the largest Danish companies are: A.P. Møller-Mærsk (international shipping), Novo (pharmaceuticals), ISS A/S (facility services), Vestas (wind turbines), Arla Foods (dairy), DSV (transport), Carlsberg Group (beer), Salling Group (retail), Ørsted A/S (power), Danske Bank.

The Danish government focused into methods to increase taxes on energy dealers in 2023.

=== Public policy ===
Danes enjoy a high standard of living and the Danish economy is characterised by extensive government welfare provisions. Denmark has a corporate tax rate of 22% and a special time-limited tax regime for expatriates. The Danish taxation system is broad based, with a 25% value-added tax, in addition to excise taxes, income taxes and other fees. The overall level of taxation (sum of all taxes, as a percentage of GDP) was 46% in 2017. The tax structure of Denmark (the relative weight of different taxes) differs from the OECD average, as the Danish tax system in 2015 was characterised by substantially higher revenues from taxes on personal income and a lower proportion of revenues from taxes on corporate income and gains and property taxes than in OECD generally, whereas no revenues at all derive from social security contributions. The proportion deriving from payroll taxes, VAT, and other taxes on goods and services correspond to the OECD average.

As of 2022, 6.5% of the population was reported to live below the poverty line, when adjusted for taxes and transfers. Denmark had the 2nd lowest relative poverty rate in the OECD after Czech Republic, below the 11.4% OECD average. The 6% of the population reporting that they could not afford to buy sufficient food was less than half of the OECD average.

=== Labour market ===
Like other Nordic countries, Denmark has adopted the Nordic Model, which combines free market capitalism with a comprehensive welfare state and strong worker protection. As a result of its acclaimed "flexicurity" model, Denmark has the freest labour market in Europe, according to the World Bank. Employers can hire and fire whenever they want (flexibility), and between jobs, unemployment compensation is relatively high (security). According to OECD, initial as well as long-term net replacement rates for unemployed persons were 65% of previous net income in 2016, against an OECD average of 53%. No restrictions apply regarding overtime work, which allows companies to operate 24 hours a day, 365 days a year. With an employment rate in 2017 of 74.2% for people aged 15–64-years, Denmark ranks 9th highest among the OECD countries, and above the OECD average of 67.8%. The unemployment rate was 5.7% in 2017, which is considered close to or below its structural level.

Danish workers work on average 1,394 hours per year, which is 22% lower than the OECD average of 1,746 hours. The job satisfaction is high in Denmark. Among Danes, 94% are satisfied with their work conditions. Danish work-life balance is generally considered to be among the best in the world and also a key contributor to Denmark's consistently high rank in the World Happiness Index.

The level of unemployment benefits is dependent on former employment and normally on membership of an unemployment fund, which is usually closely connected to a trade union, and previous payment of contributions. Circa 65% of the financing comes from earmarked member contributions, whereas the remaining third originates from the central government and hence from general taxation.

=== Business ===
Establishing a business in Denmark can be undertaken in a matter of hours and at very low costs. The Danish government operates a "Danish Business Authority", and launched a series of initiatives in 2012 aiming to simplify business rules, making it easier to run a business without jeopardising the intended goals of relevant legislation.

=== Science and technology ===
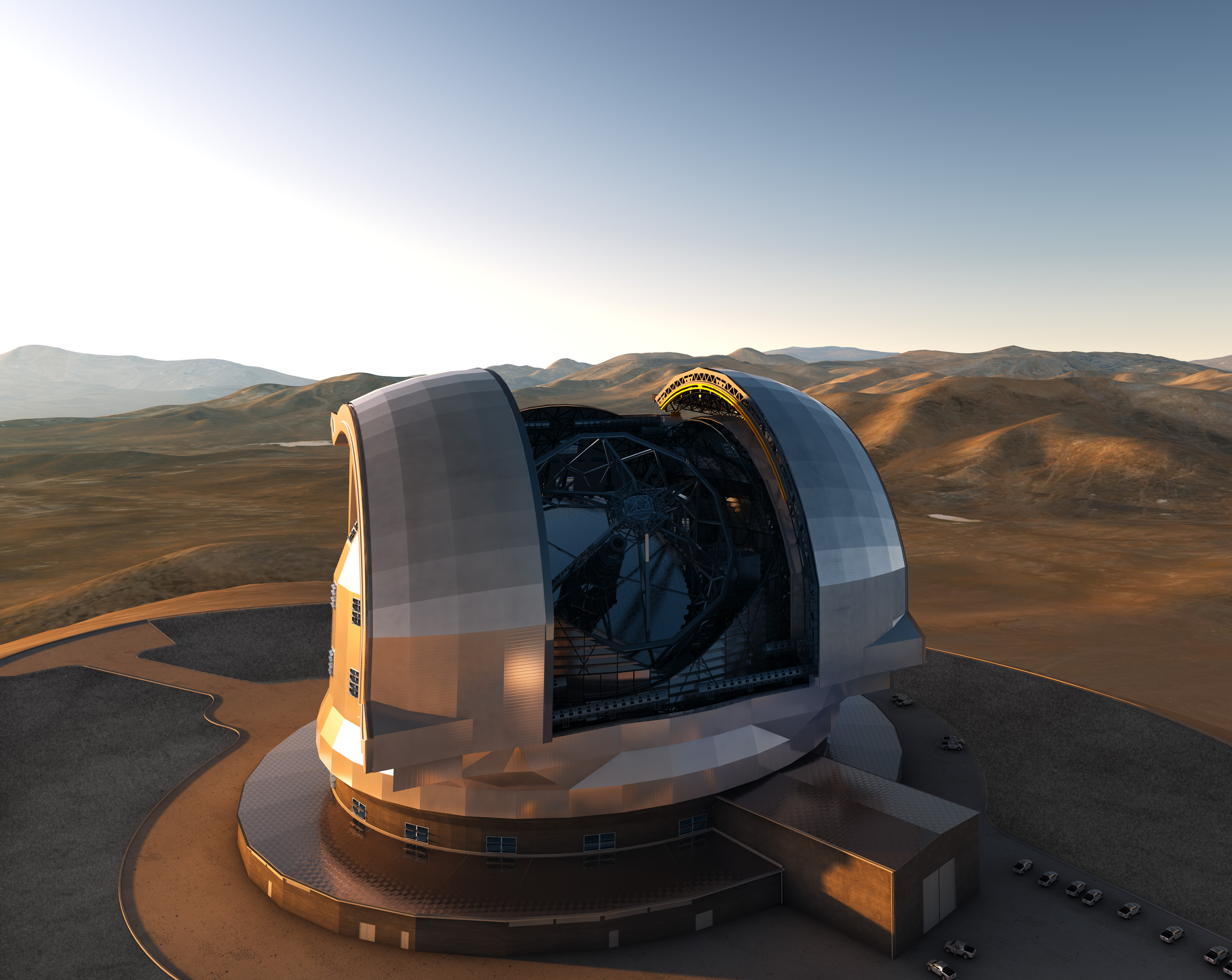
With an investment of 8.5 million euros over the ten-year construction period, Denmark confirms participation in E-ELT.

Denmark has a long tradition of scientific and technological invention and engagement, and has been involved internationally from the start of the Scientific Revolution. In current times, Denmark is participating in many high-profile international science and technology projects, including CERN, ITER, ESA, ISS and E-ELT. Denmark was ranked 9th in the Global Innovation Index in 2025, and remained in the same position in the index of 2026.

In the 20th century, Danes have also been innovative in several fields of the technology sector. Danish companies have been influential in the shipping industry with the design of the largest and most energy efficient container ships in the world, the Maersk Triple E class, and Danish engineers have contributed to the design of MAN Diesel engines. In the software and electronic field, Denmark contributed to design and manufacturing of Nordic Mobile Telephones, and the now-defunct Danish company DanCall was among the first to develop GSM mobile phones.

Life science is a key sector with extensive research and development activities. Danish engineers are world-leading in providing diabetes care equipment and medication products from Novo and, since 2000, the Danish biotech company Novozymes, the world market leader in enzymes for first generation starch-based bioethanol, has pioneered development of enzymes for converting waste to cellulosic ethanol. Medicon Valley, spanning the Øresund Region between Zealand and Sweden, is one of Europe's largest life science clusters.

Danish-born computer scientists and software engineers have taken leading roles in some of the world's programming languages: Anders Hejlsberg (Turbo Pascal, Delphi, C#); Rasmus Lerdorf (PHP); Bjarne Stroustrup (C++); David Heinemeier Hansson (Ruby on Rails); Lars Bak, a pioneer in virtual machines (V8, Java VM, Dart). Physicist Lene Vestergaard Hau is the first person to stop light, leading to advances in quantum computing, nanoscale engineering, and linear optics.

=== Energy ===
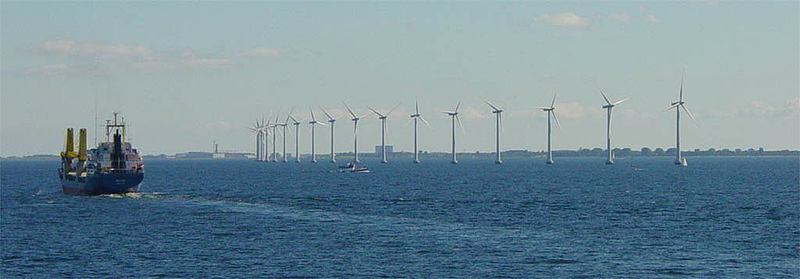
Middelgrunden, an offshore wind farm near Copenhagen

Denmark has considerably large deposits of oil and natural gas in the North Sea and ranks as number 32 in the world among net exporters of crude oil and was producing 259,980 barrels of crude oil a day in 2009. Denmark is a long-time leader in wind power: In 2015 wind turbines provided 42.1% of the total electricity consumption. In May 2011 Denmark derived 3.1% of its gross domestic product from renewable (clean) energy technology and energy efficiency, or around €6.5 billion ($9.4 billion). Denmark is connected by electric transmission lines to other European countries.

Denmark's electricity sector has integrated energy sources such as wind power into the national grid. Denmark now aims to focus on intelligent battery systems (V2G) and plug-in vehicles in the transport sector. The country is a member nation of the International Renewable Energy Agency (IRENA).

Denmark exported roughly 460 million GJ of energy in 2018.

=== Transport ===
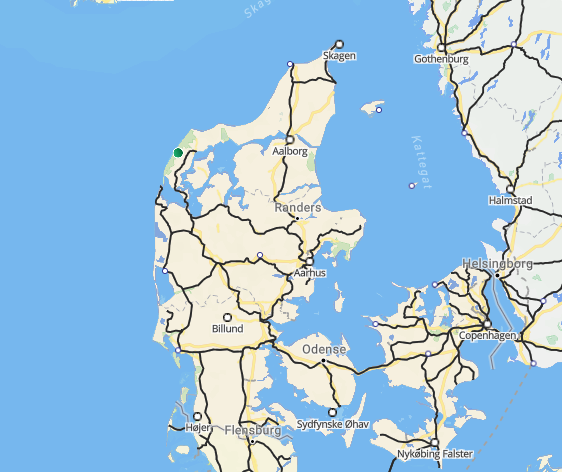
Denmark railway network

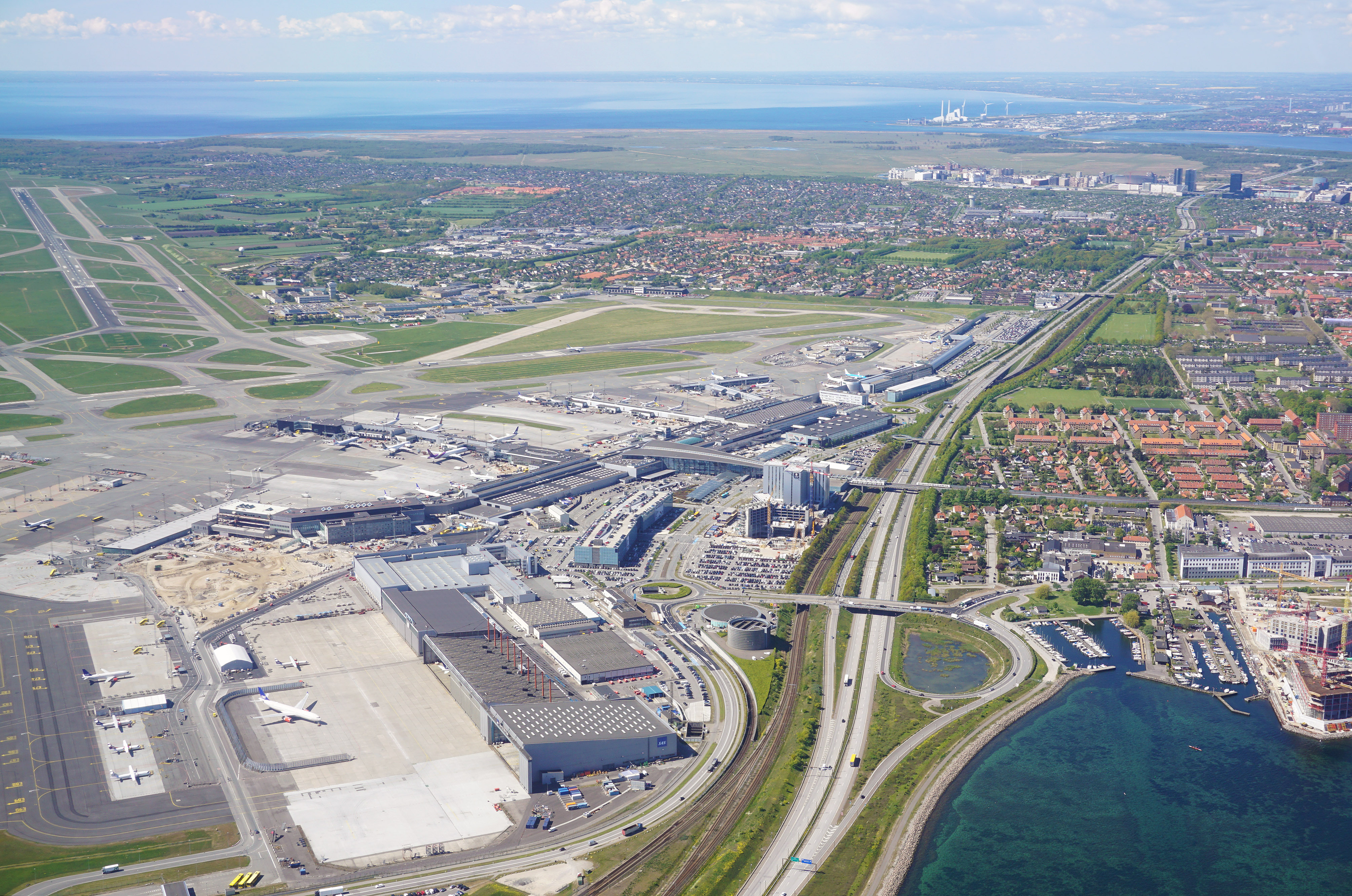
Copenhagen Airport is the largest airport in Scandinavia and the 15th-busiest in Europe.

Significant investment has been made in building road and rail links between regions in Denmark, most notably the Great Belt Fixed Link, which connects Zealand and Funen. It is now possible to drive from Frederikshavn in northern Jutland to Copenhagen on eastern Zealand without leaving the motorway. The main railway operator is DSB for passenger services and DB Cargo for freight trains. The railway tracks are maintained by Banedanmark. The North Sea and the Baltic Sea are intertwined by various, international ferry links. Construction of the Fehmarn Belt Fixed Link, connecting Denmark and Germany with a second link, Started in 2021. Copenhagen has a rapid transit system, the Copenhagen Metro, and an extensive electrified suburban railway network, the S-train. In the four largest cities – Copenhagen, Aarhus, Odense, Aalborg – light rail systems are planned to be in operation around 2020.

Cycling in Denmark is a very common form of transport, particularly for the young and for city dwellers. With a network of bicycle routes extending more than 12,000 km and an estimated 7,000 km of segregated dedicated bicycle paths and lanes, Denmark has a solid bicycle infrastructure.

Private vehicles are increasingly used as a means of transport. Because of the high registration tax (150%), VAT (25%), and one of the world's highest income tax rates, new cars are very expensive. The purpose of the tax is to discourage car ownership. In 2007, an attempt was made by the government to favour environmentally friendly cars by slightly reducing taxes on high mileage vehicles. However, this has had little effect, and in 2008 Denmark experienced an increase in the import of fuel inefficient old cars, as the cost for older cars—including taxes—keeps them within the budget of many Danes. As of 2011, the average car age is 9.2 years.

With Norway and Sweden, Denmark is part of the Scandinavian Airlines flag carrier. Copenhagen Airport is Scandinavia's busiest passenger airport, handling almost 30 million passengers in 2024. Other notable airports are Billund Airport, Aalborg Airport, and Aarhus Airport.

== Demographics ==
Population by ancestry (Q3 2026):
1. People of Danish origin (including Faroese and Greenlandic) (83.1%)
2. Immigrant (13.0%)
3. Descendant of an immigrant (3.86%)

=== Population ===
In May 2025, the population of Denmark, as registered by Statistics Denmark, was 6 million. Denmark has one of the oldest populations in the world, with the average age of 42.2 years, with 0.99 males per female. Despite a low birth rate of 11.3 births per 1000 population, the population is growing at an average annual rate of 0.44% because of net immigration and increasing longevity. The World Happiness Report frequently ranks Denmark's population as the happiest in the world. This has been attributed to the country's highly regarded education and health care systems, and its low level of income inequality. People in Denmark feel responsible for social welfare. The rate of taxation is among the world's highest and can be half a Dane's income but they get most healthcare free, university tuition is also free and students get grants, there is subsidised child care and old people get pensions and care helpers.

Denmark is a historically homogeneous nation. However, as with its Scandinavian neighbours, Denmark has recently transformed from a nation of net emigration, up until World War II, to a nation of net immigration. Today, residence permits are issued mostly to immigrants from other EU countries (54% of all non-Scandinavian immigrants in 2017). Another 31% of residence permits were study- or work-related, 4% were issued to asylum seekers and 10% to persons who arrive as family dependants. Overall, the net migration rate in 2017 was 2.1 migrant(s)/1,000 population, somewhat lower than the United Kingdom and the other Nordic countries.

There are no official statistics on ethnic groups, but according to 2020 figures from Statistics Denmark, 86.1% of the population in Denmark was of Danish descent (including Faroese and Greenlandic), defined as having at least one parent who was born in the Kingdom of Denmark and holds Danish nationality. The remaining 13.89% were of foreign background, defined as immigrants or descendants of recent immigrants. With the same definition, the most common countries of origin were Turkey, Poland, Syria, Germany, Iraq, Romania, Lebanon, Pakistan, Bosnia and Herzegovina, and Somalia. Minorities in Denmark include Turks, Poles, Syrians, Germans, Iraqis, Romanians and people from former Yugoslavia. There are also other Asian and African populations in the country. Small numbers of Romani people and Hungarians live in Denmark. There is also a small Jewish population.

The Inuit are Indigenous to Greenland in the Kingdom and have traditionally inhabited Greenland and the northern parts of Canada and Alaska in the Arctic. From the 18th century up to the 1970s, the Danish government (Dano-Norwegian until 1814) tried to assimilate the Greenlandic Inuit, encouraging them to adopt the majority language and culture. Because of this "Danization process", some persons of Inuit ancestry now identify their mother tongue as Danish.

=== Languages ===
Danish is the de facto national language of Denmark. Faroese and Greenlandic are the official languages of the Faroe Islands and Greenland respectively. German is a recognised minority language in the area of the former South Jutland County (now part of the Region of Southern Denmark), which was part of the German Empire prior to the Treaty of Versailles. Danish and Faroese belong to the North Germanic (Nordic) branch of the Indo-European languages, along with Icelandic, Norwegian, and Swedish. There is some degree of mutual intelligibility between Danish, Norwegian, and Swedish. Danish is more distantly related to German, which is a West Germanic language. Greenlandic or "Kalaallisut" is an Inuit language, and is entirely unrelated to Danish, although it has adopted many Danish loanwords including the words for numbers.

A large majority of Danes (87%) speak English at a conversational level. German is the second most widely spoken foreign language, with 49% reporting conversational proficiency. Denmark had 25,900 native speakers of German in 2007 (mostly in the South Jutland area).

=== Religion ===
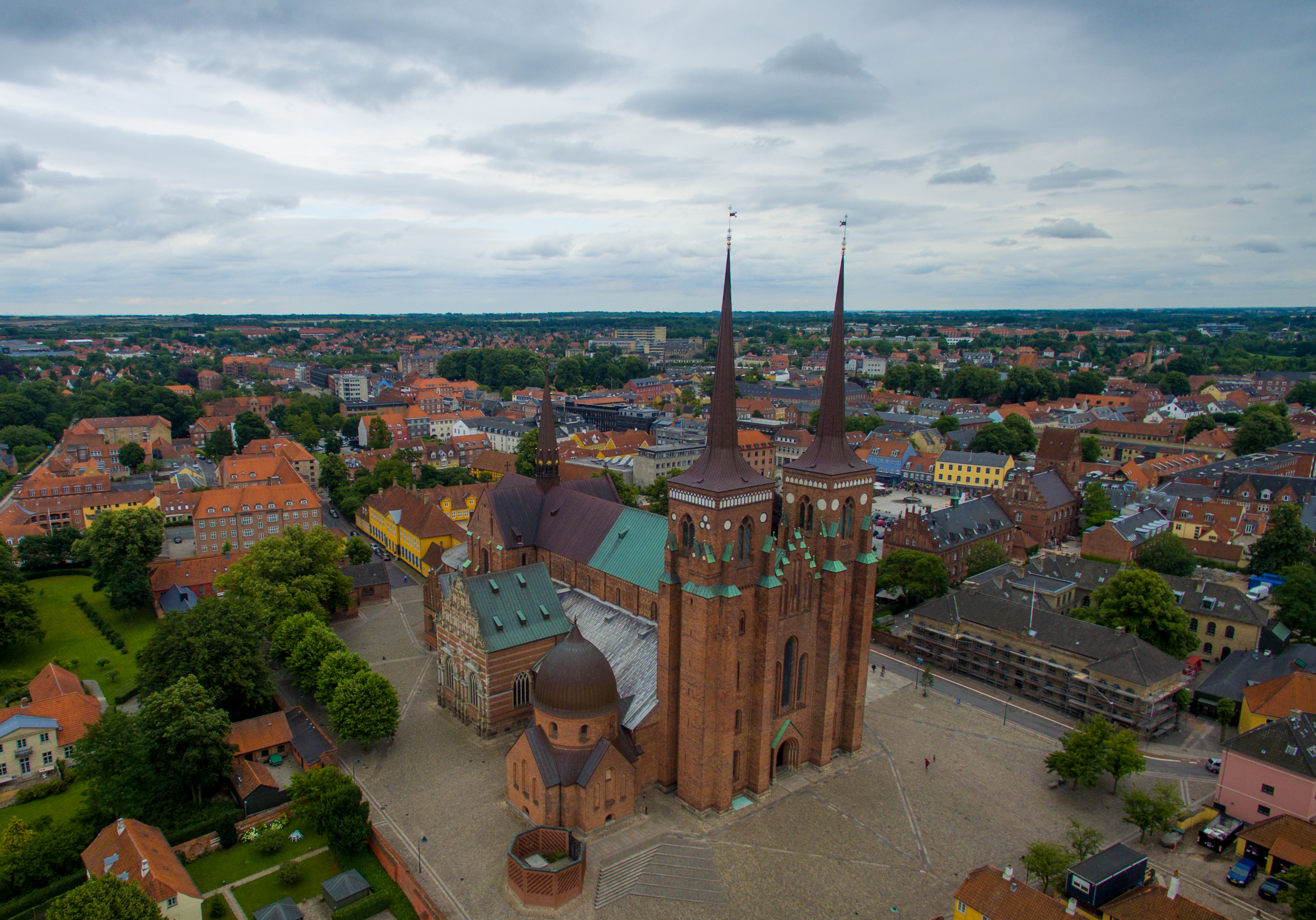
Roskilde Cathedral has been the burial place of Danish royalty since the 15th century. In 1995 it became a World Heritage Site.

Religion in Denmark (The World Factbook 2024)
1. Lutheranism (71.4%)
2. Islam (4.30%)
3. Other / none (24.3%)

Christianity is the dominant religion in Denmark. As of 2026, 70% of the population of Denmark were members of the Church of Denmark (Den Danske Folkekirke), the officially established church, which is Protestant in classification and Lutheran in orientation. (Note: The Church of Denmark is the established church (or state religion) in Denmark and Greenland; the Church of the Faroe Islands became an independent body in 2007.) The membership percentage has been in steady decline since the 1970s, mainly as fewer newborns are being baptised into it. Only 3% of the population regularly attend Sunday services and only 19% of Danes consider religion to be an important part of their life.

The Constitution states that the sovereign be Lutheran, though the rest of the population is free to adhere to other faiths. In 1682 the state granted limited recognition to three religious groups dissenting from the Established Church: Roman Catholicism, the Reformed Church and Judaism, although conversion to these groups from the Church of Denmark remained illegal initially. Until the 1970s, the state formally recognised "religious societies" by royal decree. Today, religious groups do not need official government recognition; they can be granted the right to perform weddings and other ceremonies without this recognition. Denmark's Muslims make up approximately 4.4% of the population and form the country's second largest religious community and largest minority religion. The Danish Foreign Ministry estimates that other religious groups comprise less than 1% of the population individually and approximately 2% when taken all together. Just under 20% of the Danish population identifies as atheist.

According to a 2010 Eurobarometer poll, 28% of Danish nationals polled responded that they "believe there is a God", 47% responded that they "believe there is some sort of spirit or life force" and 24% responded that they "do not believe there is any sort of spirit, God or life force". Another poll, carried out in 2009, found that 25% of Danes believe Jesus is the son of God, and 18% believe he is the saviour of the world.

In its 2024 Freedom in the World report, Freedom House rated the country 4 out of 4 for religious freedom.

=== Education ===
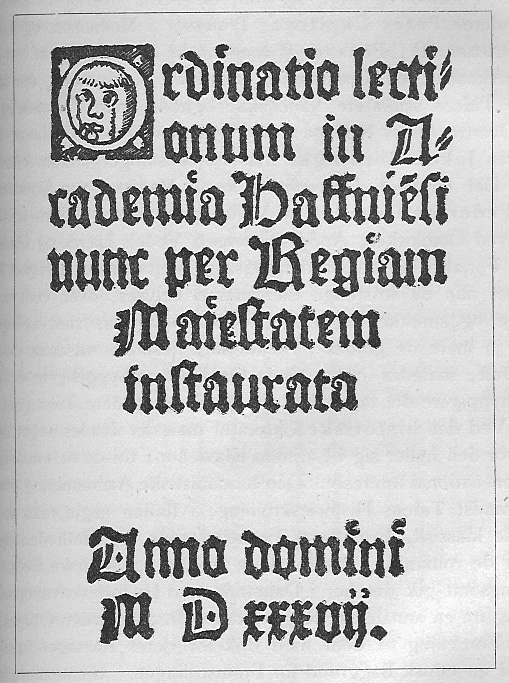
The oldest surviving Danish lecture plan dated 1537 from the University of Copenhagen

All educational programmes in Denmark are regulated by the Ministry of Education and administered by local municipalities. Folkeskole covers the entire period of compulsory education, encompassing primary and lower secondary education. Most children attend folkeskole for 10 years, from the ages of 6 to 16. There are no final examinations, but pupils can choose to sit an exam when finishing ninth grade (14–15 years old). The test is obligatory if further education is to be attended. Alternatively pupils can attend an independent school (friskole), or a private school (privatskole), such as Christian schools or Waldorf schools.

Following graduation from compulsory education, there are several continuing educational opportunities; the Gymnasium (STX) attaches importance in teaching a mix of humanities and science, Higher Technical Examination Programme (HTX) focuses on scientific subjects and the Higher Commercial Examination Programme emphasises on subjects in economics. Higher Preparatory Examination (HF) is similar to Gymnasium (STX), but is one year shorter. For specific professions, there is vocational education, training young people for work in specific trades by a combination of teaching and apprenticeship.

The government records upper secondary school completion rates of 83% and tertiary enrolment and completion rates of 45% in 2018. All university and college (tertiary) education in Denmark is free of charges; there are no tuition fees to enrol in courses. Students aged 18 or above may apply for state educational support grants, known as Statens Uddannelsesstøtte (SU), which provides fixed financial support, disbursed monthly. Danish universities offer international students a range of opportunities for obtaining an internationally recognised qualification in Denmark. Many programmes may be taught in the English language, the academic lingua franca, in bachelor's degrees, master's degrees, doctorates and student exchange programmes.

=== Health ===
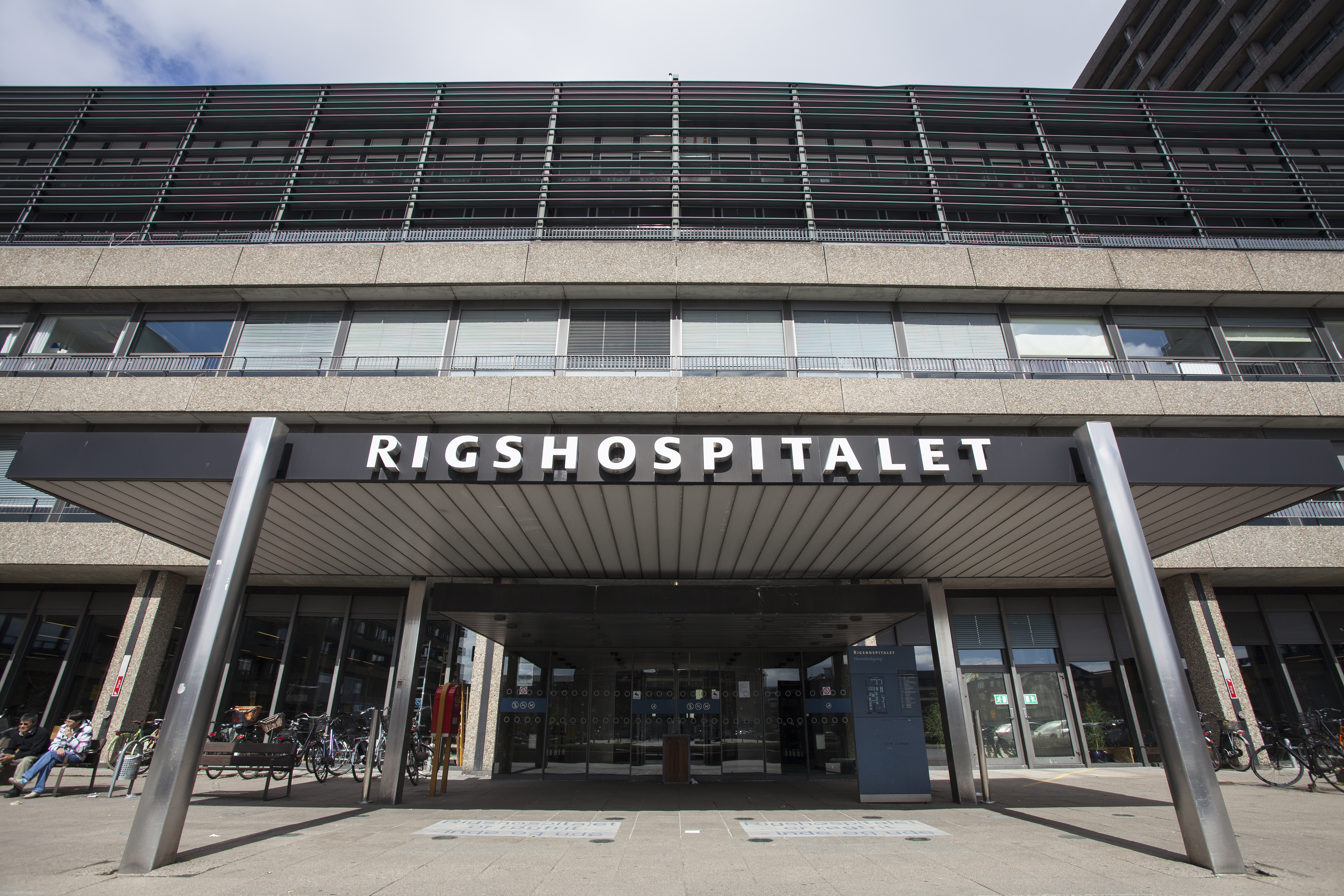
Rigshospitalet in Copenhagen, the most specialised hospital in Denmark, receiving over 350,000 unique patients a year

As of 2022, Denmark has a life expectancy of 81.3 years at birth (79.5 for men, 83.2 for women), up from 80.6 years in 2015. This ranks it 26th among 193 nations, behind the other Nordic countries. The National Institute of Public Health of the University of Southern Denmark has calculated 19 major risk factors among Danes that contribute to a lowering of the life expectancy; this includes smoking, alcohol, drug abuse and physical inactivity. Although the obesity rate is lower than in North America and most other European countries, the large number of overweight Danes results in an annual additional consumption in the health care system of DKK 1,625 million. In a 2012 study, Denmark had the highest cancer rate of all countries listed by the World Cancer Research Fund International; researchers suggest the reasons are better reporting, but also lifestyle factors like heavy alcohol consumption, smoking and physical inactivity.

Denmark has a universal health care system, characterised by being publicly financed through taxes and, for most of the services, run directly by the regional authorities. One of the sources of income was a national health care contribution (sundhedsbidrag) (2007–11:8%; '12:7%; '13:6%; '14:5%; '15:4%; '16:3%; '17:2%; '18:1%; '19:0%) but it was phased out from January 2019 in favour of income taxes. This means that most health care provision is free at the point of delivery for all residents. Additionally, roughly two in five have complementary private insurance to cover services not fully covered by the state, such as physiotherapy. As of 2012, Denmark spends 11.2% of its GDP on health care; this is up from 9.8% in 2007 (US$3,512 per capita). This places Denmark above the OECD average and above the other Nordic countries.

=== Vulnerable residential areas ===
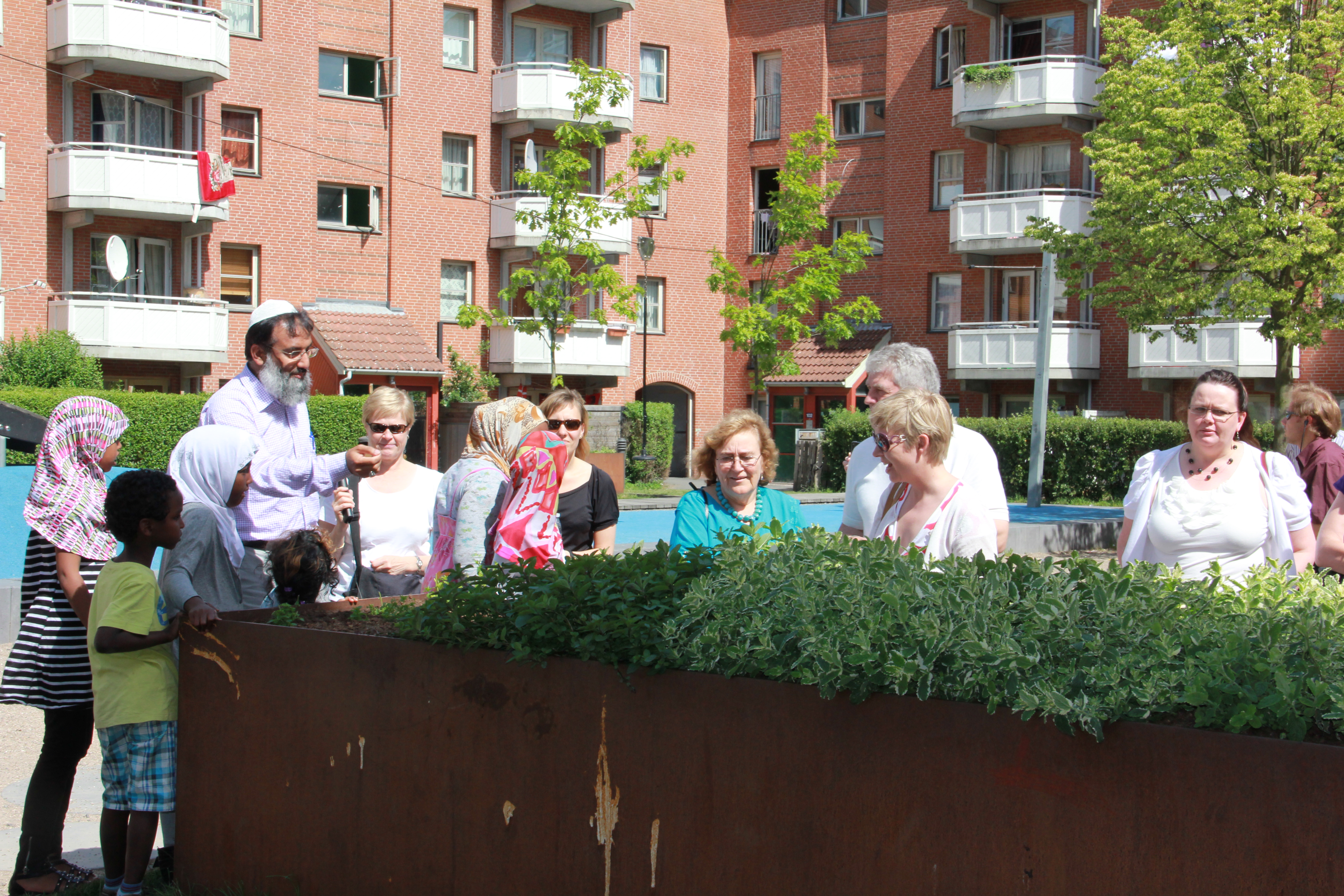
Mjølnerparken in Copenhagen

Certain social housing districts in Denmark fulfilling specific statistical criteria of relatively low employment, school attendance, relatively low income, a relatively low educational level or relatively many convicted inhabitants are officially listed by the government as vulnerable residential areas. In some cases, the majority of the neighbourhoods consist of non-Western immigrants and their descendants. Over the years, several government initiatives have been taken to further integration and counter urban decay in these neighbourhoods. Major plans to this end were presented in 1994 and 2000 by the governments of Poul Nyrup Rasmussen, in 2004 by the Anders Fogh Rasmussen I Cabinet, in 2010 by the Lars Løkke Rasmussen I Cabinet, in 2013 by the Helle Thorning-Schmidt I Cabinet, in 2018 by the Lars Løkke Rasmussen III Cabinet, and in 2021 by the Mette Frederiksen I Cabinet. Some of the policies have been criticised for undercutting 'equality before law' and for portraying immigrants, especially Muslim immigrants, in a bad light.

During the years 2010–2021, the term "ghetto" was used officially to designate some or all of the vulnerable areas. The term was considered controversial, however, and removed in 2021. Denmark is the only country to have officially used the word 'ghetto' in the 21st century to denote certain residential areas. From 2021, four different lists are published, depending on the residents' income levels, employment status, education levels, criminal convictions and origin (a statistical criterion based on parents' geographical birthplace and citizenship). In 2023, there were 19 vulnerable residential areas in Denmark.

== Culture ==
Denmark shares strong cultural and historic ties with its Scandinavian neighbours Sweden and Norway. It has historically been one of the most socially progressive cultures in the world. In 1969, Denmark was the first country to legalise pornography, and in 2012, Denmark replaced its "registered partnership" laws, which it had been the first country to introduce in 1989, with gender-neutral marriage, and allowed same-sex marriages to be performed in the Church of Denmark. Modesty and social equality are important parts of Danish culture. In a 2016 study comparing empathy scores of 63 countries, Denmark ranked 4th world-wide having the highest empathy among surveyed European countries.

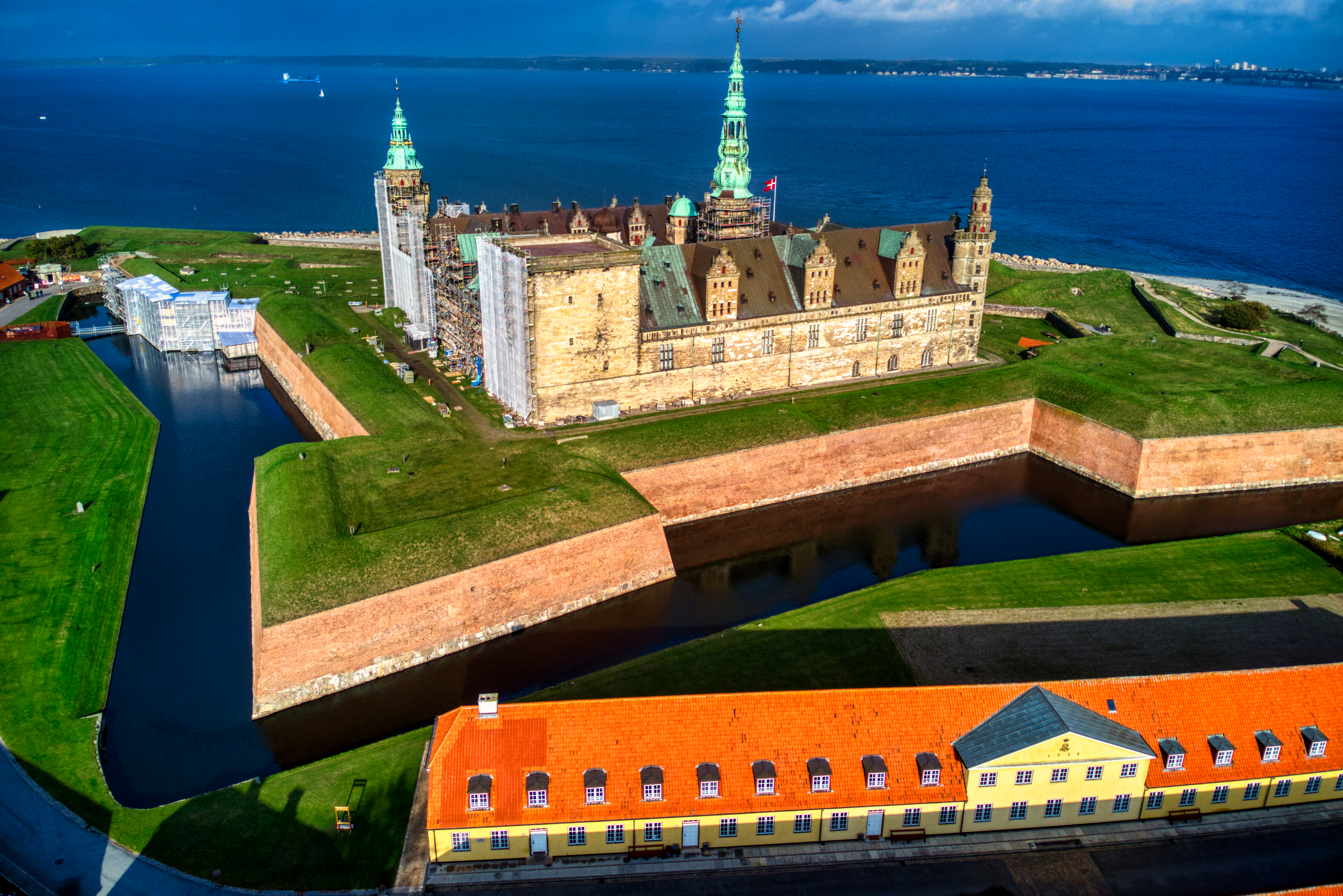
Kronborg Castle in the town of Helsingør. Immortalized as Elsinore in William Shakespeare's play Hamlet, Kronborg is one of the most important Renaissance castles in Northern Europe and was inscribed on the UNESCO World Heritage list in Northern Europe in 2000.

The astronomical discoveries of Tycho Brahe, Ludwig A. Colding's neglected articulation of the principle of conservation of energy, and the contributions to atomic physics of Niels Bohr indicate the range of Danish scientific achievement. The fairy tales of Hans Christian Andersen, the philosophical essays of Søren Kierkegaard, the short stories of Karen Blixen (penname Isak Dinesen), the plays of Ludvig Holberg, and the dense, aphoristic poetry of Piet Hein, have earned international recognition, as have the symphonies of Carl Nielsen. From the mid-1990s, Danish films have attracted international attention, especially those associated with Dogme 95 like those of Lars von Trier and Thomas Vinterberg.

A major feature of Danish culture is Jul (Danish Christmas). The holiday is celebrated throughout December, starting either at the beginning of Advent or on 1 December with a variety of traditions, culminating with the Christmas Eve meal.

There are seven heritage sites inscribed on the UNESCO World Heritage list in Northern Europe: Christiansfeld, a Moravian Church Settlement, the Jelling Mounds (Runic Stones and Church), Kronborg Castle, Roskilde Cathedral, and the Par force hunting landscape in North Zealand and 3 in the World Heritage list in North America: Ilulissat Icefjord, Aasivissuit—Nipisat, Kujataa within the Kingdom of Denmark.

=== Human rights ===
Denmark is usually considered a progressive country, which has adopted legislation and policies to support women's rights, minority rights, and LGBT rights. Human rights in Denmark are protected by the state's Constitution of the Realm (Danmarks Riges Grundlov); applying equally in Denmark proper, Greenland and the Faroe Islands, and through the ratification of international human rights treaties. Denmark has held a significant role in the adoption of both the European Convention on Human Rights and in the establishment of the European Court of Human Rights (ECHR). In 1987, the Kingdom Parliament (Folketinget) established a national human rights institution, the Danish Centre of Human Rights, now the Danish Institute for Human Rights.

In 2009, a referendum on changing the Danish Act of Succession were held to grant absolute primogeniture to the Danish throne, meaning that the eldest child, regardless of gender, takes precedence in the line of succession. As it was not retroactive, the current successor to the throne is the eldest son of the King, rather than his eldest child. The Danish constitution Article 2 states that "The monarchy is inherited by men and women".

The Inuit have for decades been the subject of discrimination and abuse by the dominant colonisers from Europe, those countries claiming possession of Inuit lands. The Inuit have never been a single community in a single region of Inuit. From the 18th century up to the 1970s, the Danish government (Dano-Norwegian until 1814) tried to assimilate the Indigenous people of Greenland, the Greenlandic Inuit, encouraging them to adopt the majority language, culture and religion. Denmark has been greatly criticised by the Greenlandic community for the politics of Danisation (1950s and 1960s) of and discrimination against the Indigenous population of the country. Critical treatment paying non-Inuit workers higher wages than the local people, the relocation of entire families from their traditional lands into settlements, and separating children from their parents and sending them away to Denmark for schooling has been practised. Nevertheless, Denmark ratified, in 1996, to recognise the ILO-convention 169 on Indigenous people recommended by the UN.

Denmark was the first country in the world to grant legal recognition to same-sex unions in the form of registered partnerships in 1989. On 7 June 2012, the law was replaced by a new same-sex marriage law, which came into effect on 15 June 2012. Greenland and the Faroe Islands legalised same-sex marriage in April 2016, and in July 2017 respectively. In January 2016, a resolution was implemented by the Danish parliament which prevented transgender identity being classified as a mental health condition. In doing so, Denmark became the first country in Europe to go against the World Health Organization (WHO) standards, which classified transgender identity as being a mental health issue until June 2018.

In its 2024 Freedom in the World report, Freedom House rated the country "free" with a score of 97 (out of 100).

=== Media ===
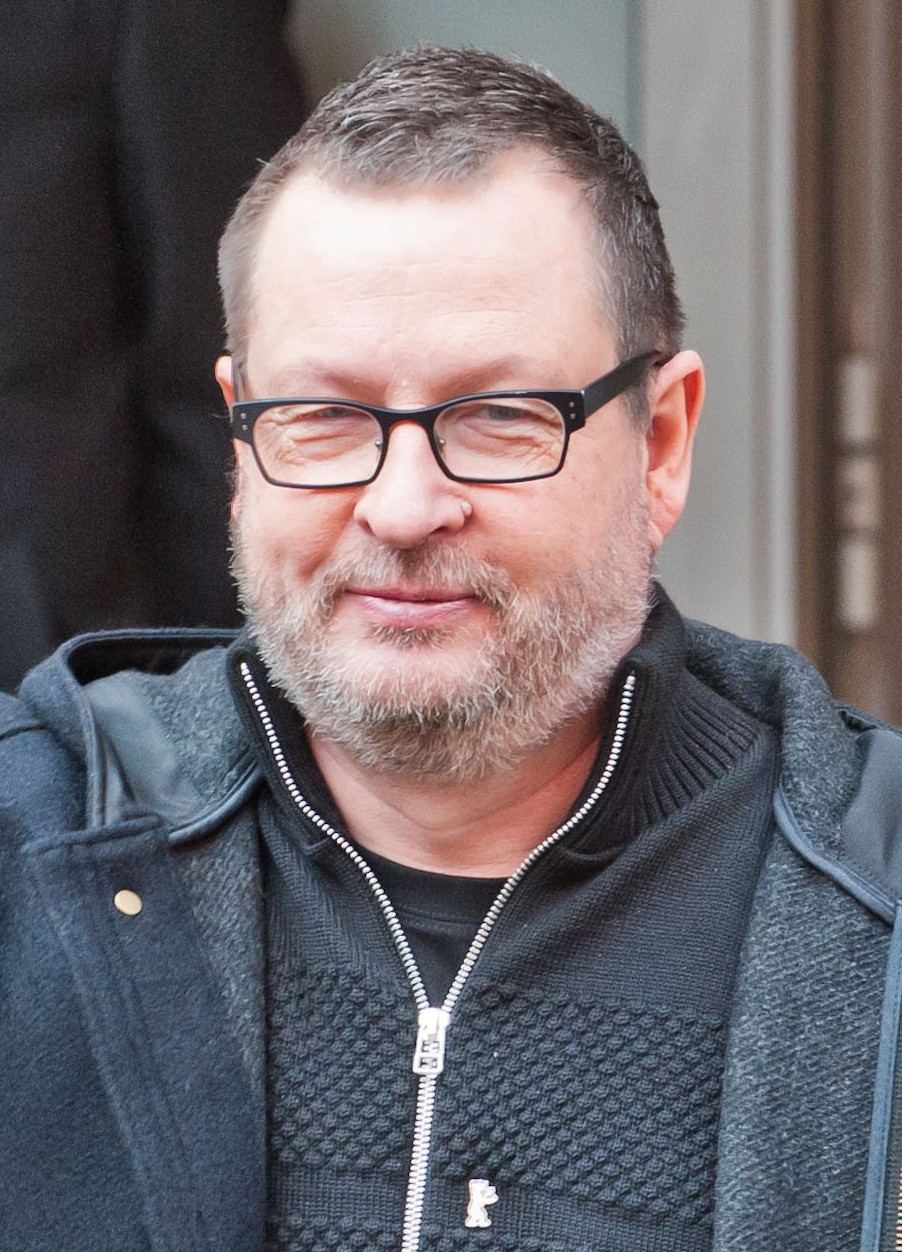
Director Lars von Trier, who co-created the Dogme 95 film movement with Thomas Vinterberg

Danish cinema dates back to 1897 and since the 1980s has maintained a steady stream of productions due largely to funding by the state-supported Danish Film Institute. There have been three big internationally important waves of Danish cinema: erotic melodrama of the silent era; the increasingly explicit sex films of the 1960s and 1970s; and lastly, the Dogme 95 movement of the late 1990s, where directors often used hand-held cameras to dynamic effect in a conscious reaction against big-budget studios. Danish films have been noted for their realism, religious and moral themes, sexual frankness and technical innovation. The Danish filmmaker Carl Th. Dreyer is considered one of the greatest directors of early cinema.

Other Danish filmmakers of note include Erik Balling, the creator of the popular Olsen-banden films; Gabriel Axel, an Oscar-winner for Babette's Feast in 1987; and Bille August, the Oscar-, Palme d'Or- and Golden Globe-winner for Pelle the Conqueror in 1988. In the modern era, notable filmmakers in Denmark include Lars von Trier, who co-created the Dogme 95 movement with Thomas Vinterberg, and multiple award-winners Susanne Bier and Nicolas Winding Refn. Mads Mikkelsen is a world-renowned Danish actor, as is Nikolaj Coster-Waldau.

Danish mass media date back to the 1540s, when handwritten fly sheets reported on the news. In 1666, Anders Bording, the father of Danish journalism, began a state paper. In 1834, the first liberal, factual newspaper appeared, and the 1849 Constitution established lasting freedom of the press in Denmark.

Modern Danish mass media and news programming are dominated by a few large corporations. In printed media JP/Politikens Hus and Berlingske Media, between them, control the largest newspapers Politiken, Berlingske Tidende and Jyllands-Posten and major tabloids B.T. and Ekstra Bladet. In television, publicly owned stations DR and TV 2 have large shares of the viewers. DR in particular is famous for its high quality TV-series often sold to foreign broadcasters and often with leading female characters like internationally known actresses Sidse Babett Knudsen and Sofie Gråbøl. In radio, DR has a near monopoly, currently broadcasting on all four nationally available FM channels, competing only with local stations.

=== Music ===
A sample from Carl Nielsen's Wind Quintet with the theme from Min Jesus, lad mit hjerte få

Denmark and its multiple outlying islands have a wide range of folk traditions. The country's most famous classical composer is Carl Nielsen (1865–1931), especially remembered for his six symphonies and his Wind Quintet, while the Royal Danish Ballet specialises in the work of the Danish choreographer August Bournonville. The Royal Danish Orchestra is among the world's oldest orchestras. Danes have distinguished themselves as jazz musicians, and the Copenhagen Jazz Festival has acquired international recognition.

The modern pop and rock scene has produced a few names of international fame, including Aqua, Alphabeat, D-A-D, King Diamond, Kashmir, Lukas Graham, Mew, Michael Learns to Rock, MØ, Oh Land, The Raveonettes and Volbeat, among others. Lars Ulrich, the drummer of the band Metallica, has become the first Danish musician to be inducted into the Rock and Roll Hall of Fame.

Roskilde Festival near Copenhagen is the largest music festival in Northern Europe since 1971 and Denmark has many recurring music festivals of all genres throughout, including Aarhus International Jazz Festival, Skanderborg Festival, The Blue Festival in Aalborg, Esbjerg International Chamber Music Festival and Skagen Festival among many others.

Denmark has participated in the Eurovision Song Contest since 1957 and has won the contest three times, in 1963, 2000 and 2013.

=== Architecture and design ===
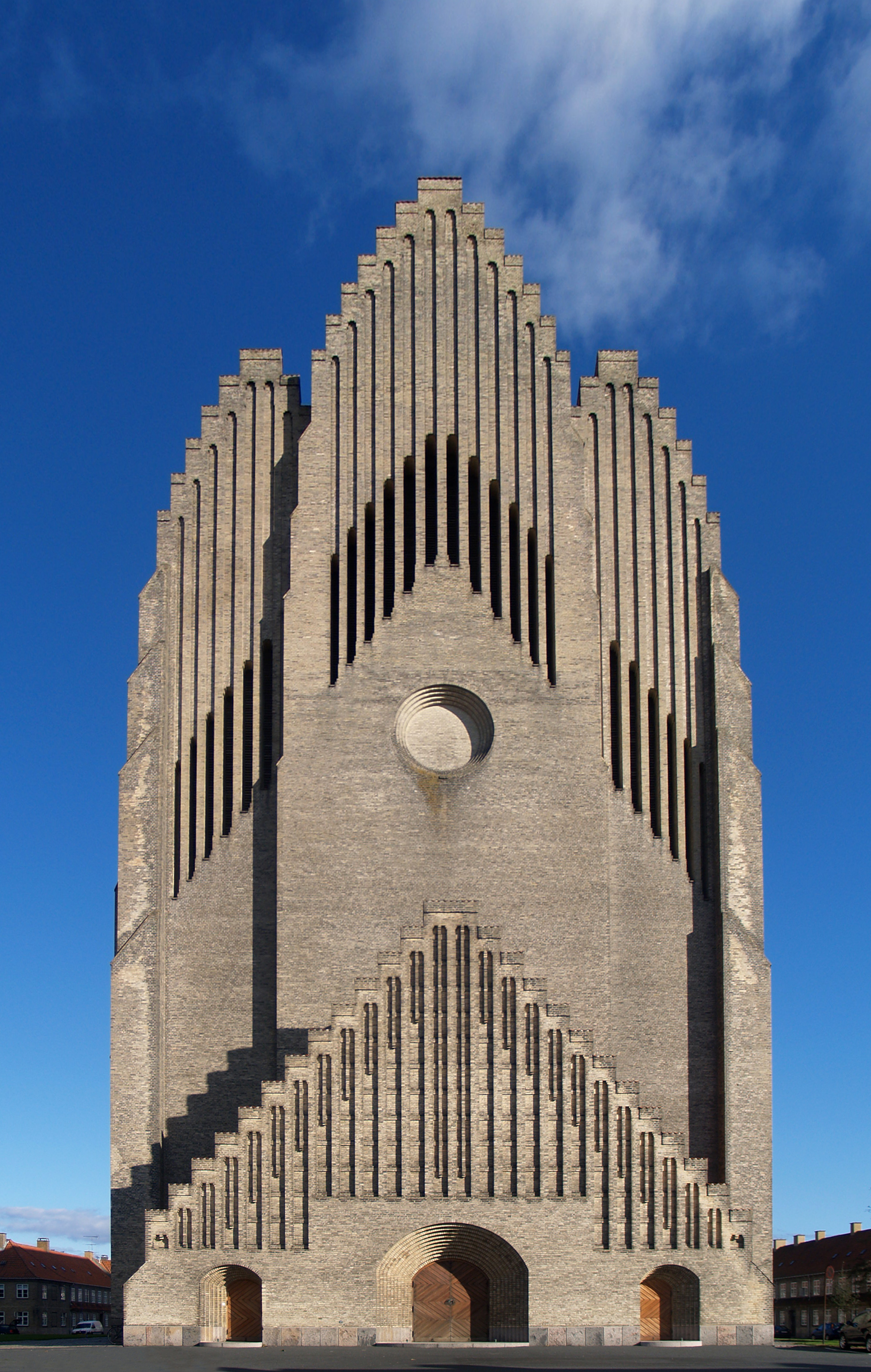
Grundtvig's Church in Copenhagen, an example of expressionist architecture

Denmark's architecture became firmly established in the Middle Ages when first Romanesque, then Gothic churches and cathedrals sprang up throughout the country. From the 16th century, Dutch and Flemish designers were brought to Denmark, initially to improve the country's fortifications, but increasingly to build magnificent royal castles and palaces in the Renaissance style. During the 17th century, many impressive buildings were built in the Baroque style, both in the capital and the provinces. Neoclassicism from France was slowly adopted by native Danish architects who increasingly participated in defining architectural style. A productive period of Historicism ultimately merged into the 19th-century National Romantic style.

The 20th century brought along new architectural styles; including expressionism, best exemplified by the designs of architect Peder Vilhelm Jensen-Klint, which relied heavily on Scandinavian brick Gothic traditions; and Nordic Classicism, which enjoyed brief popularity in the early decades of the century. It was in the 1960s that Danish architects such as Arne Jacobsen entered the world scene with their highly successful Functionalist architecture. This, in turn, has evolved into more recent world-class masterpieces including Jørn Utzon's Sydney Opera House and Johan Otto von Spreckelsen's Grande Arche in Paris, paving the way for a number of contemporary Danish designers such as Bjarke Ingels to be rewarded for excellence both at home and abroad.

Danish design is a term often used to describe a style of functionalistic design and architecture that was developed in the mid-20th century, originating in Denmark. Danish design is typically applied to industrial design, furniture and household objects, which have won many international awards. The Royal Porcelain Factory is famous for the quality of its ceramics. Danish design is also a well-known brand, often associated with world-famous, 20th-century designers and architects such as Børge Mogensen, Finn Juhl, Hans Wegner, Arne Jacobsen, Poul Henningsen and Verner Panton. Other designers of note include Kristian Solmer Vedel in the area of industrial design, Jens Quistgaard for kitchen furniture and implements and Ole Wanscher who had a classical approach to furniture design.

=== Literature and philosophy ===
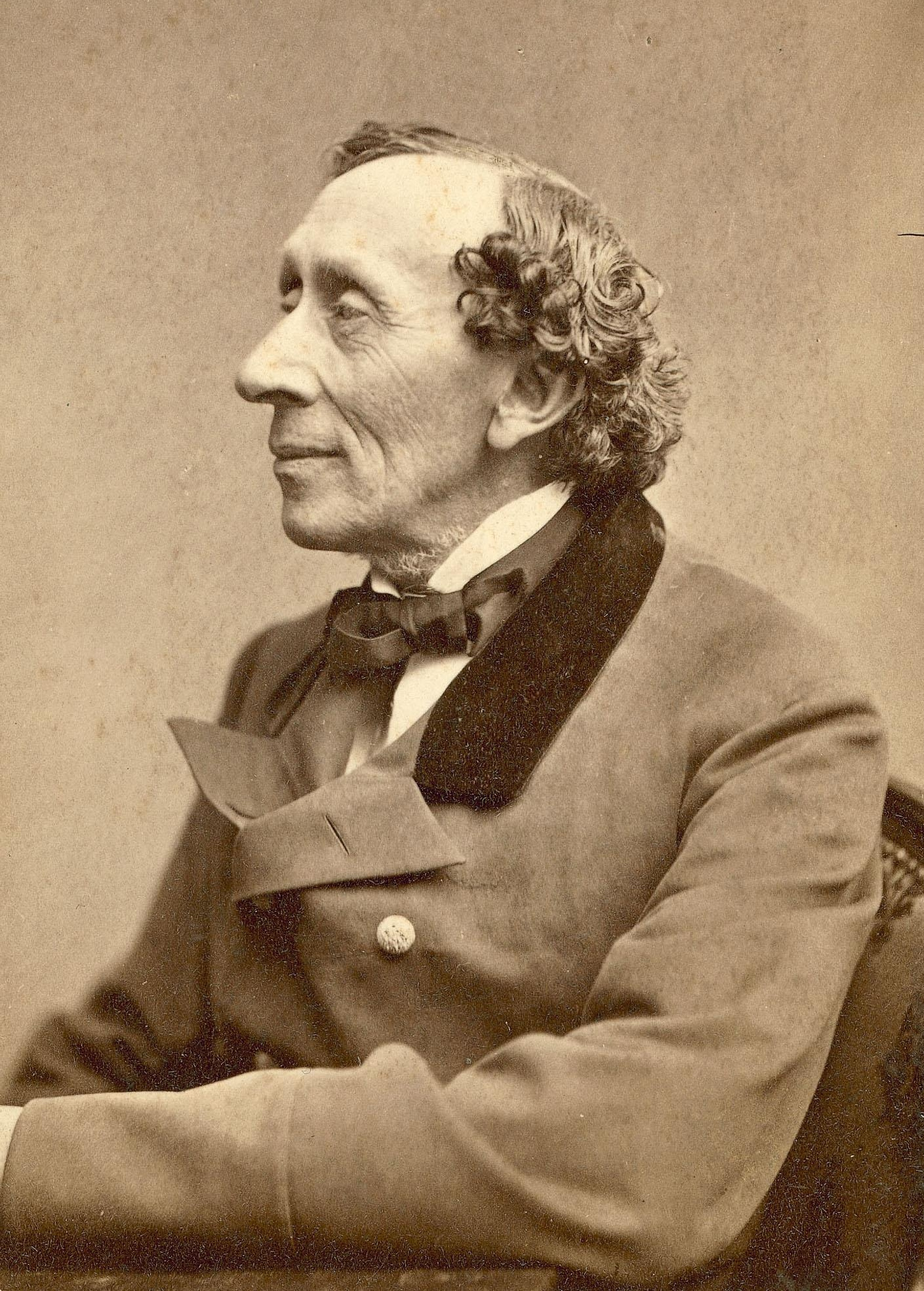
Renowned author Hans Christian Andersen, best remembered for his literary fairy tales

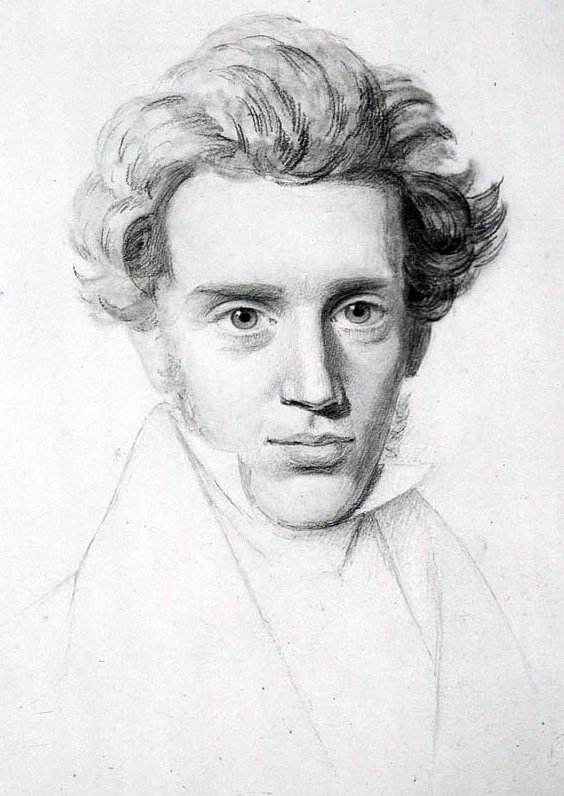
Søren Kirkegaard, existentialist philosopher considered one of the most important figures of the Danish Golden Age

The first known Danish literature is myths and folklore from the 10th and 11th century. Saxo Grammaticus, normally considered the first Danish writer, worked on a chronicle of Danish history (Gesta Danorum). Very little is known of other Danish literature from the Middle Ages. With the Age of Enlightenment came Ludvig Holberg whose comedy plays are still being performed.

In the late 19th century, literature was seen as a way to influence society. Known as the Modern Breakthrough, this movement was championed by Georg Brandes, Henrik Pontoppidan (awarded the Nobel Prize in Literature) and J. P. Jacobsen. Romanticism influenced the renowned writer and poet Hans Christian Andersen, known for his stories and fairy tales, e.g. The Ugly Duckling, The Little Mermaid and The Snow Queen. In recent history Johannes Vilhelm Jensen was also awarded the Nobel Prize for Literature. Karen Blixen is famous for her novels and short stories. Other Danish writers of importance are Herman Bang, Gustav Wied, William Heinesen, Martin Andersen Nexø, Piet Hein, Hans Scherfig, Klaus Rifbjerg, Dan Turèll, Tove Ditlevsen, Inger Christensen and Peter Høeg.

Danish philosophy has a long tradition as part of Western philosophy. Perhaps the most influential Danish philosopher was Søren Kierkegaard, the creator of Christian existentialism. Kierkegaard had a few Danish followers, including Harald Høffding, who later in his life moved on to join the movement of positivism. Another Danish philosopher of note is Grundtvig, whose philosophy gave rise to a new form of non-aggressive nationalism in Denmark, and who is also influential for his theological and historical works.

=== Painting and photography ===
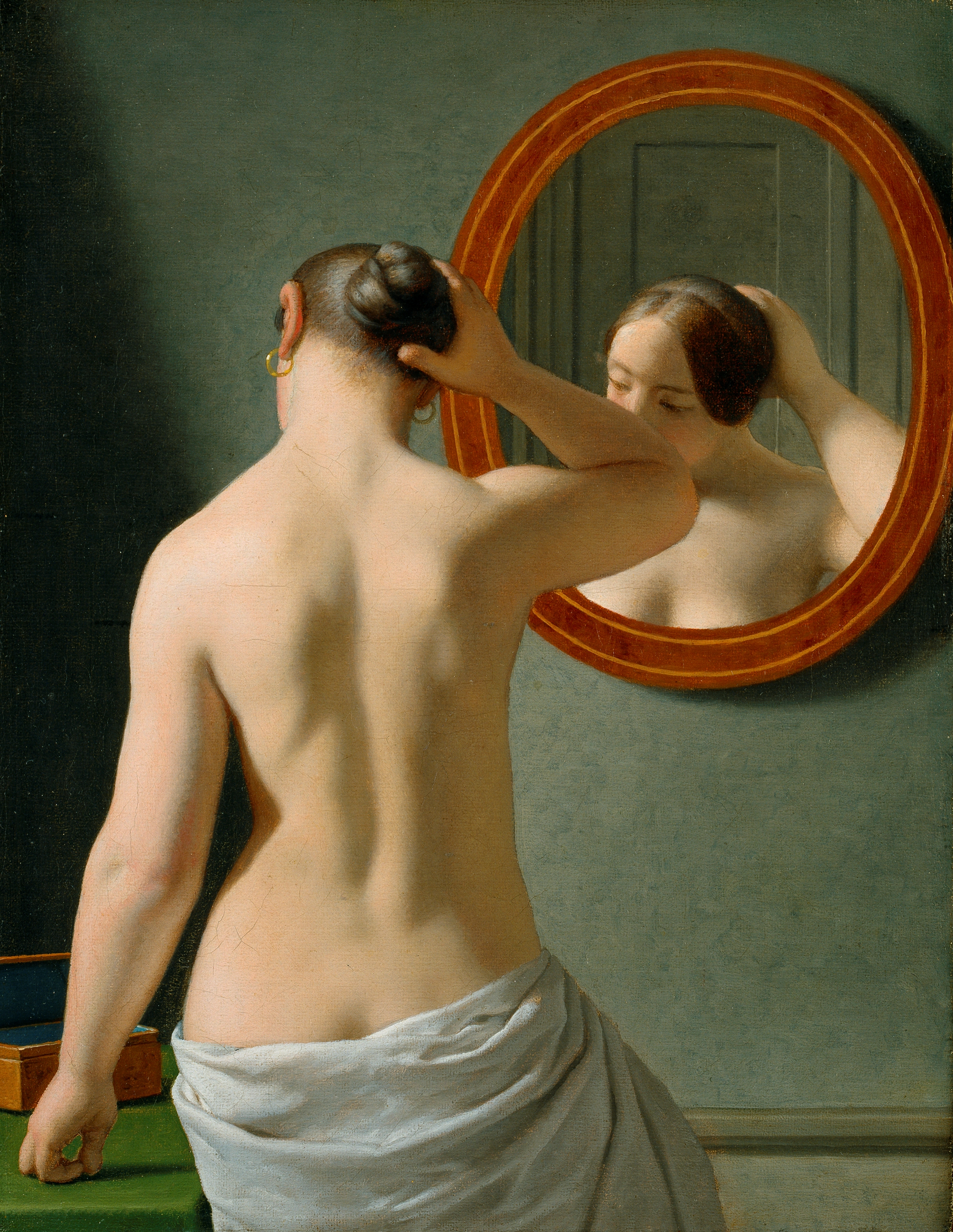
Woman in Front of a Mirror, (1841), by Christoffer Wilhelm Eckersberg

While Danish art was influenced over the centuries by trends in Germany and the Netherlands, the 15th- and 16th-century church frescos, which can be seen in many of the country's older churches, are of particular interest as they were painted in a style typical of native Danish painters.

The Danish Golden Age, which began in the first half of the 19th century, was inspired by a new feeling of nationalism and romanticism, typified in the later previous century by history painter Nicolai Abildgaard. Christoffer Wilhelm Eckersberg was not only a productive artist in his own right but taught at the Royal Danish Academy of Fine Arts where his students included Wilhelm Bendz, Christen Købke, Martinus Rørbye, Constantin Hansen, and Wilhelm Marstrand.

In 1871, Holger Drachmann and Karl Madsen visited Skagen in the far north of Jutland where they quickly built up one of Scandinavia's most successful artists' colonies specialising in Naturalism and Realism rather than in the traditional approach favoured by the academy. Hosted by Michael and his wife Anna, they were soon joined by P.S. Krøyer, Carl Locher and Laurits Tuxen. All participated in painting the natural surroundings and local people. Similar trends developed on Funen with the Fynboerne who included Johannes Larsen, Fritz Syberg and Peter Hansen, and on the island of Bornholm with the Bornholm school of painters including Niels Lergaard, Kræsten Iversen and Oluf Høst.

Painting has continued to be a prominent form of artistic expression in Danish culture, inspired by and also influencing major international trends in this area. These include impressionism and the modernist styles of expressionism, abstract painting and surrealism. While international co-operation and activity has almost always been essential to the Danish artistic community, influential art collectives with a firm Danish base includes De Tretten (1909–1912), Linien (1930s and 1940s), COBRA (1948–1951), Fluxus (1960s and 1970s), De Unge Vilde (1980s) and more recently Superflex (founded in 1993). Notable Danish painters from modern times representing various art movements include Theodor Philipsen (impressionism and naturalism), Anna Klindt Sørensen (expressionism), Franciska Clausen (Neue Sachlichkeit, cubism, surrealism and others), Henry Heerup (naivism), Robert Jacobsen (abstract painting), Carl Henning Pedersen (abstract painting), Asger Jorn (Situationist, abstract painting), Bjørn Wiinblad (art deco, orientalism), Per Kirkeby (neo-expressionism, abstract painting), Per Arnoldi (pop art), and Michael Kvium (neo-surrealism).

Danish photography has developed from strong participation and interest in the very beginnings of the art of photography in 1839. Pioneers such as Mads Alstrup and Georg Emil Hansen paved the way for a rapidly growing profession during the last half of the 19th century. Today Danish photographers such as Astrid Kruse Jensen and Jacob Aue Sobol are active in key exhibitions around the world.

=== Cuisine ===
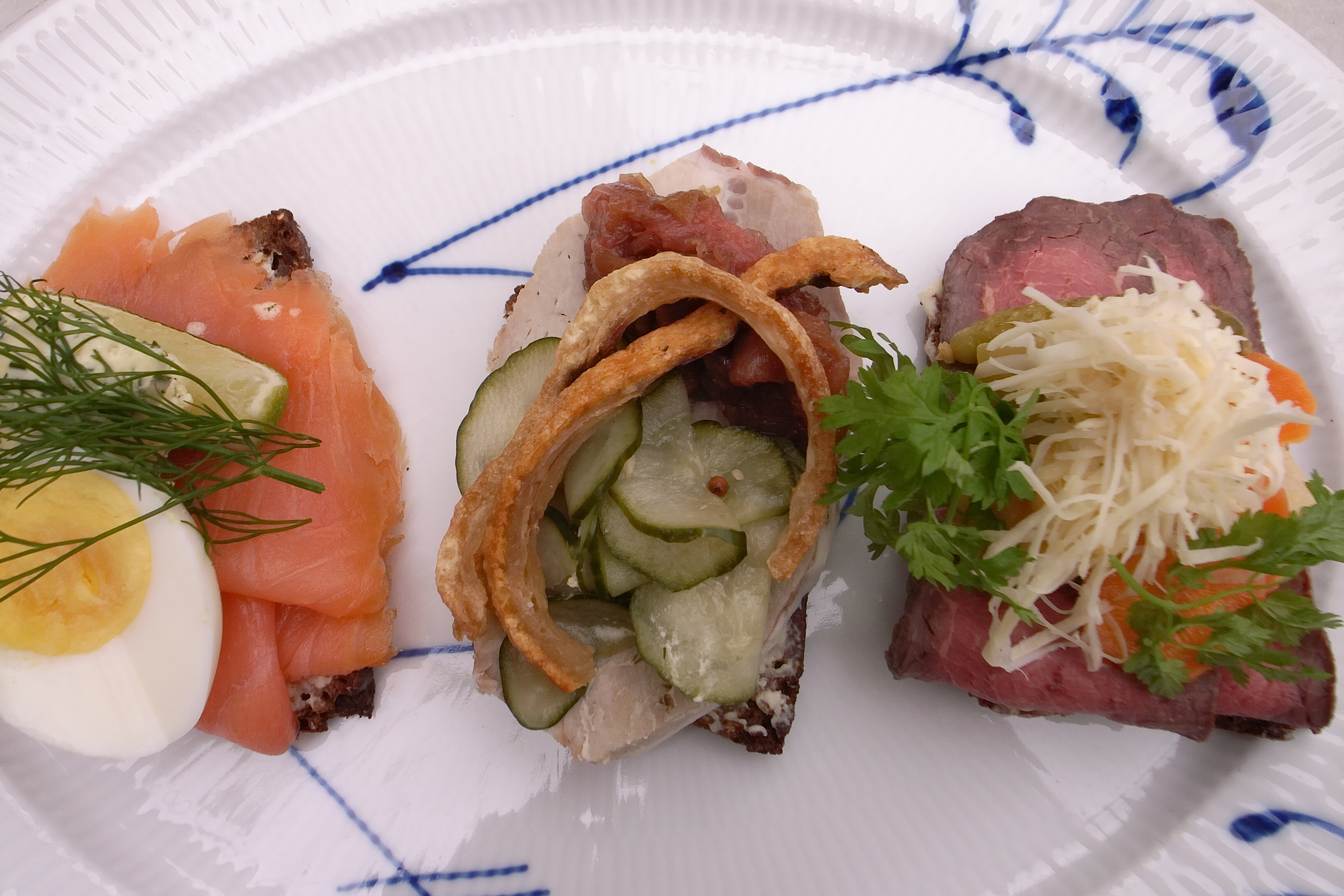
Smørrebrød, a variety of Danish open sandwiches piled high with delicacies

The traditional cuisine of Denmark, like that of the other Nordic countries and of Northern Germany, consists mainly of meat, fish and potatoes. Danish dishes are highly seasonal, stemming from the country's agricultural past, its geography, and its climate of long, cold winters.

The open sandwiches on rye bread, known as smørrebrød, can be considered a national speciality. Hot meals traditionally consist of ground meats, such as frikadeller (meat balls of veal and pork) and hakkebøf (minced beef patties), or of more substantial meat and fish dishes such as flæskesteg (roast pork with crackling) and kogt torsk (poached cod) with mustard sauce. Denmark is known for its Carlsberg and Tuborg beers and for its akvavit and bitters.

Since around 1970, chefs and restaurants across Denmark have introduced gourmet cooking, largely influenced by French cuisine. Also inspired by continental practices, Danish chefs have recently developed a new innovative cuisine and a series of gourmet dishes based on high-quality local produce known as New Danish cuisine. As a result of these developments, Denmark now has a considerable number of internationally acclaimed restaurants of which several have been awarded Michelin stars. This includes Geranium and Noma in Copenhagen.

=== Sports ===
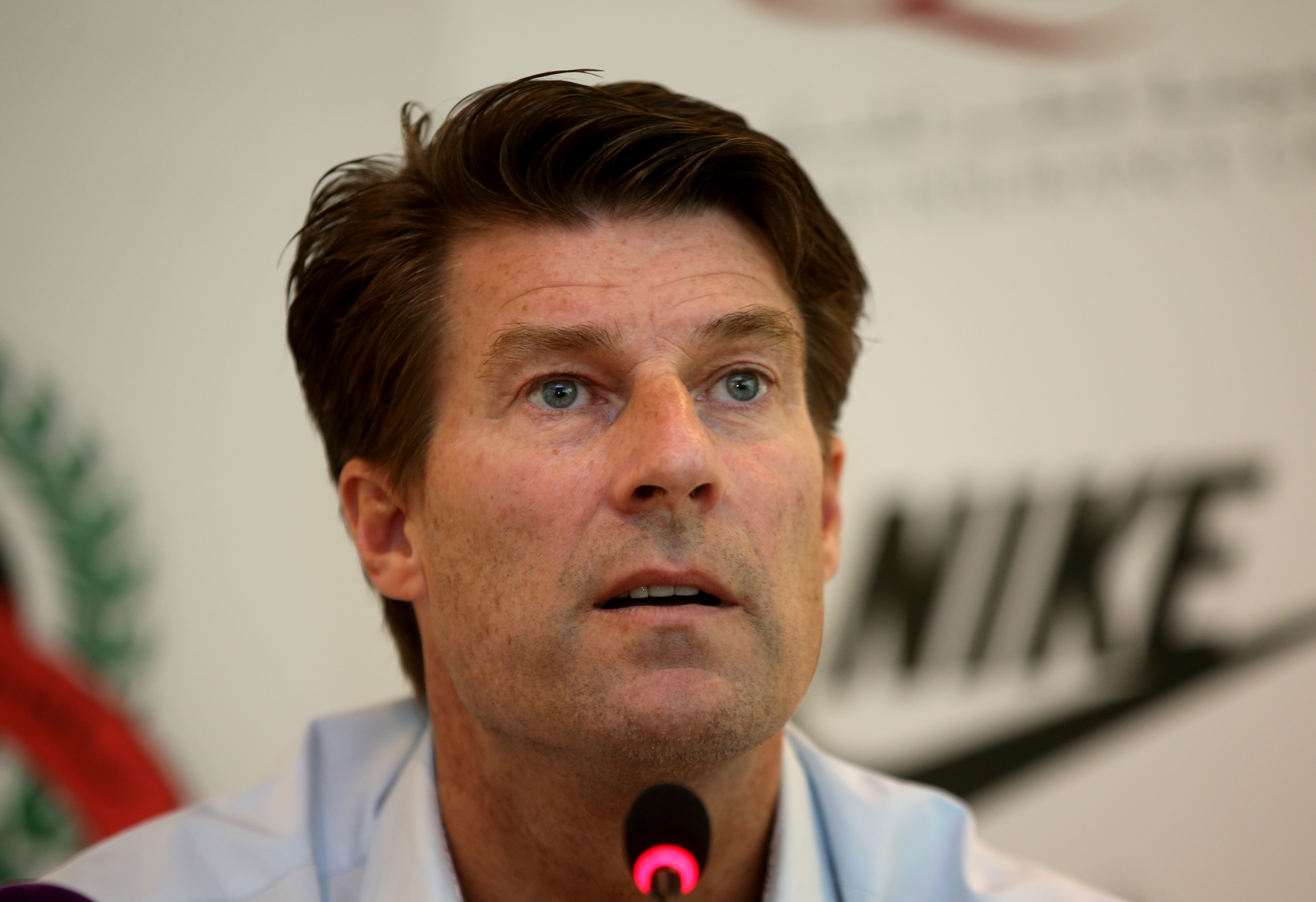
Michael Laudrup was named the best Danish football player of all time by the Danish Football Union.

Sports are popular in Denmark, and its citizens participate in and watch a wide variety. The national sport is football, with over 320,000 players in more than 1600 clubs. Denmark qualified six times consecutively for the European Championships between 1984 and 2004, and were crowned European champions in 1992; other significant achievements include winning the Confederations Cup in 1995 and reaching the quarter-final of the 1998 World Cup. The Denmark women's national handball team celebrated great successes during the 1990s and has won a total of 13 medals—seven gold (in 1994, 1996 (2), 1997, 2000, 2002 and 2004), four silver (in 1962, 1993, 1998 and 2004) and two bronze (in 1995 and 2013). On the men's side, Denmark has won 12 medals—four gold (in 2008, 2012, 2016 and 2019), four silver (in 1967, 2011, 2013 and 2014) and four bronze (in 2002, 2004, 2006 and 2007)—the most that have been won by any team in European Handball Championship history. In 2019, the Danish men's national handball team won their first World Championship title.

In recent years, Denmark has made a mark as a strong cycling nation, with Michael Rasmussen reaching King of the Mountains status in the Tour de France in 2005 and 2006. Other popular sports include golf—which is mostly popular among those in the older demographic; tennis—in which Denmark is successful on a professional level; basketball—Denmark joined the international governing body FIBA in 1951; rugby—the Danish Rugby Union dates back to 1950; ice hockey—often competing in the top division in the Men's World Championships; rowing—Denmark specialise in lightweight rowing and are particularly known for their lightweight coxless four, having won six gold and two silver World Championship medals and three gold and two bronze Olympic medals; and several indoor sports—especially badminton, table tennis and gymnastics, in each of which Denmark holds World Championships and Olympic medals.

== See also ==
- Outline of Denmark
- Religion in Denmark
