= Transport in Copenhagen =

Transport in Copenhagen and the surrounding area relies on a well-established infrastructure making it a hub in Northern Europe due to its road and rail networks as well as its international airport. Copenhagen is considered one of the world's most bicycle-friendly cities.

The metro and S-train systems are key features of the city's well-developed public transport facilities. The city is also served by ferry connections to Oslo in Norway while its harbour is a popular port of call for cruise ships.

== Road ==
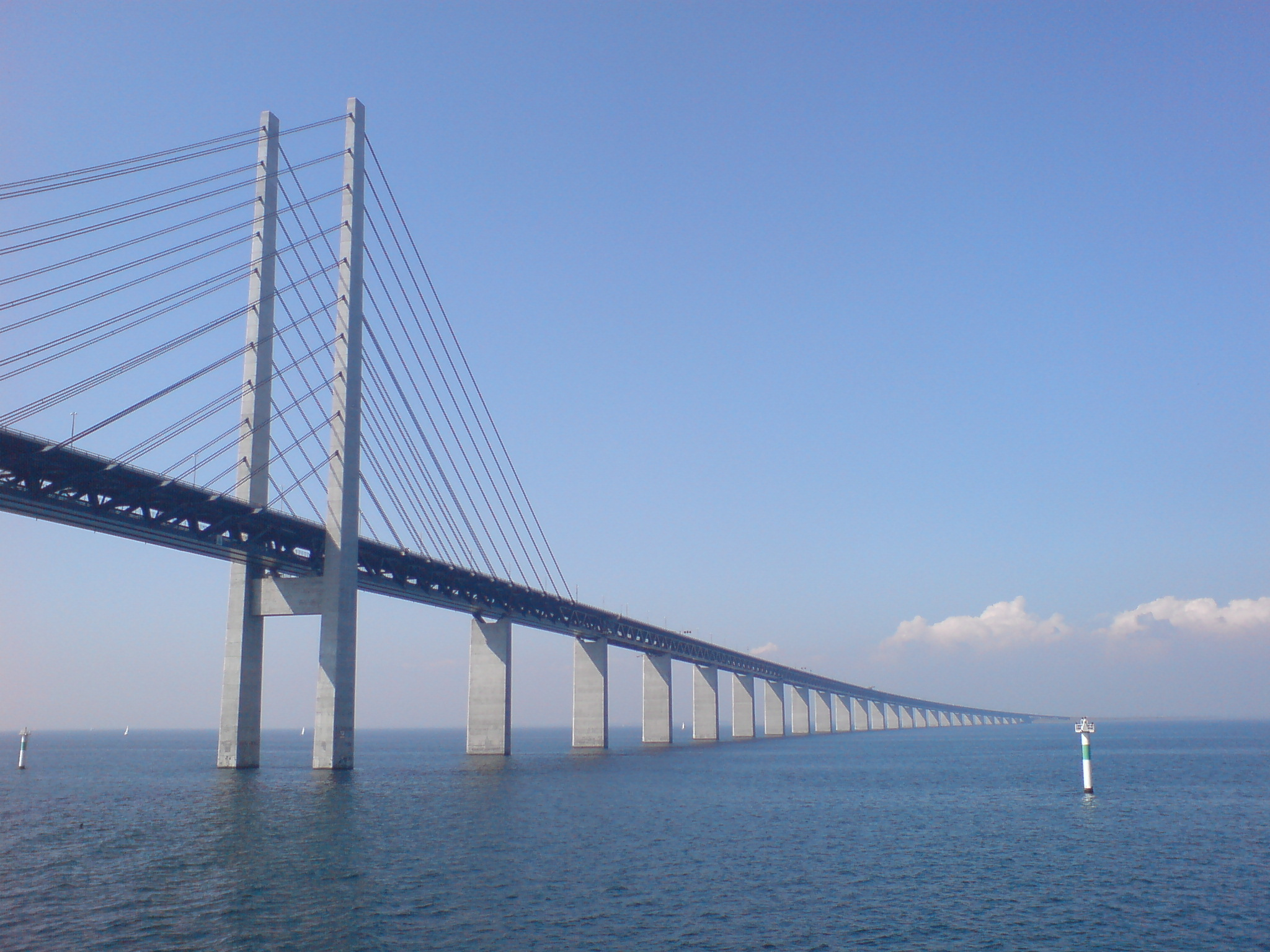
The Øresund Bridge connecting Denmark and Sweden.

Copenhagen has a large network of toll-free motorways and public roads connecting different municipalities of the city together and to Northern Europe. As in many other cities in Europe, traffic is increasing in Copenhagen. The radial arterial roads leading to Copenhagen city centre are critically congested during peak hours.

Since July 2000, the Øresund Bridge has served as a road and rail link to Malmö in Sweden.

In October 2011, heated political talks arose regarding plans about road tolls around Copenhagen in order to combat the car congestion and improve the air quality. Discussions were abandoned in February 2012 due to disagreement of the physical locations of the toll road boundaries and political deadlock.

=== Traffic signals ===
In Copenhagen, the length of the green walk time varies by the time of day. There is no flashing clearance interval. Pedestrians are not used to having to press a button to get a green light. Pedestrian crossings are typically unprotected by traffic signal filter arrows (no red or green arrow) but protected turns may be implemented in response to fatalities.

As of 2018, 55% of all crashes in the City of Copenhagen occur at intersections.

==== Signal timing ====
Fixed (cycle) time traffic signal control is typically used in Copenhagen. Københavns Kommune (the Municipality of Copenhagen) does not believe that adaptive traffic signal control systems are suitable for the inner city where there are many pedestrians and cyclists because of the long traffic signal cycle times. A Danish report for the municipality also claimed there may be conflicts between an adaptive system and the municipality's wish for cyclists to be prioritised.

Adaptive traffic signals are considered appropriate only when the road functions as an arterial are at the limit of (vehicle) capacity, have only few vulnerable road users (pedestrians and cyclists), and where the road functions both as an arterial road and a local traffic distributor.

As of 2009 Copenhagen typically used 4 different fixed time signal programs over the day, typically morning, afternoon, daytime and nighttime. As of 2012, Copenhagen had 4 standard programs:

- Program 1: 80 second cycle in the morning
- Program 2: 80 second cycle in the afternoon
- Program 3: 70 second cycle in medium traffic
- Program 4: 60 second low traffic program (Note: Increased from 48 to 60 seconds sometime before 2009.)

The volume of people walking and cycling had no influence on the traffic signal cycle program selection, meaning cyclist conditions were determined by the flow of cars and not cyclists themselves. This was identified as challenge for future generations of traffic planners.

As of 2009 there were two adaptive signal systems in Copenhagen, Motion in Valby around Toftegårds Allé (10 intersections controlled by Motion by Siemens, for bus priority) and a group of junctions from Vasbygade to the Amager Motorway (Spot, Swarco).

The longest traffic signal cycle time utilised (as of 2009) was 100 seconds on the main roads, and the shortest was 48 seconds (mostly in night programmes, and in a few places during the day like Nørre Alle at Parken-Borgmester Jensens Alle).

==== Green waves ====
Green wave traffic signal corridors have existed since at least 2004, with a 13 junction in Norrebrogade in 2004.

Copenhagen had a goal for 2018 (with a 2011 baseline) to reduce travel time and the number of stops for bicycles, a focus in the inner city to give pedestrians enough time to cross the road on green, to reduce travel time and increase reliability of buses, and to not increase (or slightly decrease) car travel time.

As of 2018, the City of Copenhagen had a goal of a 10% reduction in travel time and the number of cyclist stops on some routes in the city. Traffic signals were optimised to ensure improved flow on some corridors. A Dutch traffic management system MobiMaestro was utilised, and BikeSim was developed as an add-on for Copenhagen to estimate cyclist travel times.

On several key roads in Copenhagen, traffic lights were timed for a green wave at about 20km/h. After new cycling budget provisions were approved in September 2025, these measures were planned for 15 more routes.

==== Signal phase and timing (SPaT) ====
In 2015 and 2016, a signal technology trial was undertaken in a central bus corridor between the Central Station and Østerport Station. Road Side Units were instled at 21 traffic signals and more than 100 vehicles were fitted with On Board Units. Compass4D was involved. Bus lines 1A, 2A, 26 and 40 were all fitted with the new technology, along with 17 trucks from 3 different transport companies. A project evaluation report was published in 2015. At least some traffic signals are still transmitting SPaT data as of 2026.

In 2016, Copenhagen planned to install 380 'smart signals to spot and prioritise buses and bikes with $8.9 million in funding. Buses were planned to communicate their position and occupancy. The green phase of traffic signals was suggested to be extended by 8-30 seconds. Copenhagen had installed 10 'smart signals' in Valby as a pilot project, and found buses saved up to two minutes during rush hour.

At ITS World Congress 2018 in Copehagen, Dynniq presented information on the signal operation. EcoDrive and Compass4D technologies had been implemented.

In Copenhagen, the Green Light Optimal Speed Advisory (GLOSA) service was implemented using cellular technology.

== Cycling ==
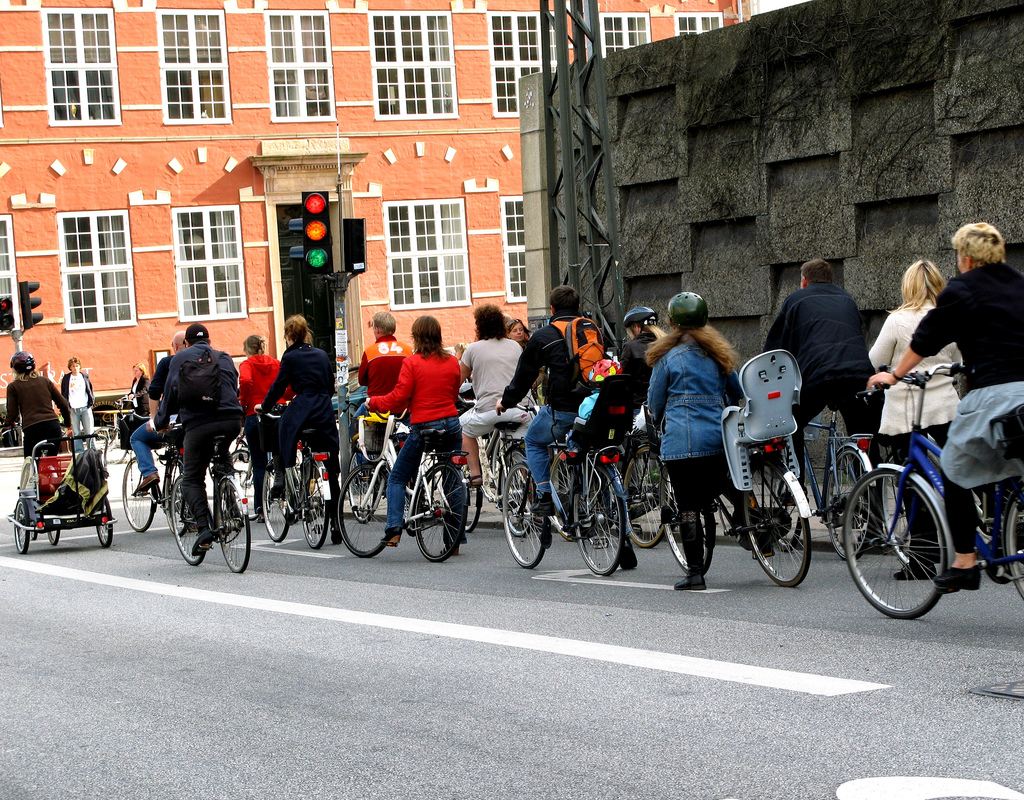
Cycling to work

Copenhagen is known as one of the most bicycle-friendly cities in the world. Every day 1.1 million km are bicycled in Copenhagen. 45% of all citizens commute to work, school or university by bicycle and it is municipal policy that this number should have gone up to 40% by 2012 and to 50% in 2015. The city's bicycle paths and cycle tracks are extensive and well used. Bicycle paths are often separated from the main traffic lanes and sometimes have their own signal systems, giving the cyclists a lead of a couple of seconds to accelerate.

The municipality is also developing a system of interconnected green bicycle routes, greenways, the aim being to facilitate fast, safe, and pleasant bicycle transport from one end of the city to the other. The network will cover more than 100 km (62 mi) and will have 22 routes when finished. The city provides public bicycles which can be found throughout the downtown area.

Copenhagen's well-developed bicycle culture is reflected in the use of copenhagenise to describe the practice of other cities adopting Copenhagen-style bike lanes and bicycle infrastructure. In 2007, Copenhagen-based Danish urban design consultant Jan Gehl was hired by the New York City Department of Transportation to re-imagine New York City streets by introducing designs to improve life for pedestrians and cyclists. In recognition of Copenhagen's emphasis on bicycling, the city was chosen by the Union Cycliste Internationale as their first official Bike City. Bike City Copenhagen took place from 2008 to 2011 and consisted of large cycling events for professionals as well as amateurs, culminating in the 2011 UCI Road World Championships.

== Public transportation ==
=== Copenhagen Metro ===
Serving Copenhagen, Frederiksberg and Tårnby in Denmark, the 20.5 km (12.7-mile) system opened between 2002 and 2007, and 2019 and 2020, and has four lines, M1, M2, M3, and M4. The AnsaldoBreda Driverless Metro cars supplements the larger S-train rapid transit system, and is integrated with DSB local trains and Movia buses. Through the city center and west to Frederiksberg, M1 and M2 share a common line. To the south-east, the system serves Amager, with the 13.7 km (8.5-mile) M1 running through the new neighborhood of Ørestad, and the 14.2 km (8.8-mile) M2 serving the eastern neighborhoods and Copenhagen Airport. The City Circle Line (Cityringen) or M3, an expansion of the Copenhagen Metro, was opened in 2019. The Nordhavn branch of the M4 line opened in 2020, and the Sydhavn branch in 2024. A fifth line, M5, will serve Refshaleøen and the under-construction artificial island of Lynetteholm, and is expected to open in 2 stages, the first one in 2036, and the second stage in 2045. The Metro currently has 35 stations, 13 of which are above ground. In 2011, the Metro carried 54.3 million passengers. A separate metro line, Øresundsmetro, connecting Copenhagen with Malmö is being considered.

=== Suburban rail ===
The S-train (Danish: S-tog) network is a metrolike urban rapid transit network mainly serving the urban Copenhagen area. It connects the city centre and inner boroughs with the outer boroughs of Copenhagen. As of January 2009 there are 170 km (106 mi) of dual track and 84 S-train stations, of which eight are in neighbouring towns outside greater Copenhagen. The system has four main lines, and their tracks are fully separated from all other traffic. Parts are elevated, other parts run in cuttings, and the central section (the Boulevard Line) is largely underground. Each line operates at a frequency of six trains per hour throughout the day. Through the city centre, however, where three of the four lines converge, trains can be as often as every two or three minutes. The fourth line, Ringbanen, takes another path through the city and has an operating frequency of 12 trains per hour. Some notable S-Train stations in central Copenhagen are Central Station (served by M3 and M4 metro lines), Valby, Nørreport (served by M1 and M2), Østerport (M3, M4), Nordhavn (M4) and the typical junctions Ny Ellebjerg (M4 metro station opening in 2024), Danshøj, Flintholm (M1, M2), Ryparken, Svanemøllen and Hellerup. The S-train system is the main rail transport within the wider Copenhagen area. In the 1990s it was decided to complement the S-Trains with a Metro system.

=== Regional trains ===
The regional trains are equally important for transport within the Metropolitan Area of Copenhagen. Important lines are for instance along Kystbanen (The Coast line) to Helsingør (Shakespeare's Elsinore with Kronborg Castle), to Copenhagen Airport, and to Roskilde. If the S-Train runs parallel, the distances between regional train stations are longer than where only regional trains are available. The regional trains also run outside the Metropolitan area (which also equals the ticket system area for all public traffic within Copenhagen). For travel outside this area, a different type of ticket must be purchased. The regional trains continues to western and southern Zealand as well as to the islands Falster and Lolland. Labeled as Øresundståg, they continue to Scania and some other Swedish provinces. The Copenhagen-Ringsted Line was inaugurated in May 2019.

=== Local trains ===
There are also three different system of local trains in the northern and southernmost suburbs. These run on unelectrified tracks, and are not available in the central parts of the city. Most local train lines begin at stations where S-train or regional trains end. The local trains are included in the ticket system of the Metropolitan area, with most being part of the R-net. A network of regional trains and bus trunk routes, both running at 30 minute frequencies.

=== Trams ===
In 1863, Copenhagen opened a tram network. At its most extensive, the network had more than twenty lines. The system closed in 1972.

After a 40-year absence, plans are now underway to build a new light rail line in Copenhagen between Lundtofte and Ishøj, which began full operation in August 2026.

=== Buses ===
Greater Copenhagen is connected by a vast system of various different bus services and types of such, managed by the regional bus agency Movia, who manage bus routes across all of Region Hovedstaden and Region Sjælland (excluding the Isle of Bornholm). Bus lines: 11, 15, 17, 23, 26, 29, 31, 33, 37, 40, 68, 2A, 7A, 5C, 250S, 81N, 82N, 83N, 85N, 93N, 97N, 666, Kombardo Expresses, FlixBus. These include:

A-buses (in red): Trunk routes with a 7.5 minute frequency or higher and all door boarding. These routes also operate 24/7 in Copenhagen. These include:

1A (Hellerup-Trianglen-Rigshospitalet-HC Ørsteds Vej-Enghave Plads-Hvidovre Hospital-Avedøre)

2A (Refshaleøen-Christianshavn-Copenhagen Central-Forum-Godthåbsvej-Brønshøj Torv-Tingbjerg)

4A (Friheden-Ny Ellebjerg/Copenhagen South-Valby-Fasanvej-Nørrebro-Emdrup Torv-Gladsaxe-Buddinge)

6A (Nørreport-Rigshospitalet-Bispebjerg-Emdrup Torv-Søborg-Buddinge)

7A (Ny Ellebjerg/Copenhagen South-Sydhavn-Copenhagen Central-Vesterbro-Frederiksberg Alle-Roskildevej/Zoo-Rødovre Centrum-Rødovrehallen)

9A/19 (Glostrup-Rødovrehallen-Jyllingevej-Vanløse-Flintholm-Peter Bangs vej/Gl. Kongevej-Frederiksberg Alle-Carlsberg-Mozarts plads-Kongens Enghave Valbyparken)

Many larger towns outside of Copenhagen also feature A-bus routes. These operate at 15 minute frequencies, don't operate at night and don't allow all door boarding. These can be found in:

Helsingør

Roskilde

Køge

Holbæk

Næstved

Ringsted

C-buses/Cityline (turquoise with yellow corners): Trunk routes with increased priority in traffic, and 4 minute frequencies or higher, and night service. Features all door boarding and all stops feature Cityline branding. This route branding is intended by Movia to be for routes applying their BRT-inspired "+way" infrastructure along large stretches. Only one Cityline route exists, this being:

5C (Herlev Hospital-Husum-Brønshøj-Bellahøj-Nørrebro-Nørreport-Copenhagen Central-Amagerbro-Sundbyvester Plads-Den Blå Planet (national aquarium)-Co`penhagen Airport). This route is the busiest in the city with 17.777.741 annual passengers (2019).

S-buses (in Blue): Fast Rapid routes with limited stops and frequencies of every 15 minutes or higher. Some of the routes (150S-250S and 350S) operate 24/7. The numbers ending on x00S are circumferential, while the routes ending in x50S are radial routes. These include:

150S (Nørreport-Rigshospitalet-Vibenhus Runddel-Ryparken-Elsinore Highway/DTU-Nærum-Gl. Holte-Hørsholm-Kokkedal)

200S (Buddinge-Gladsaxe-Husum-Rødovre-Hvidovre Hospital-Friheden)

250S (Bagsværd-Gladsaxe-Bellahøj-Nørrebro-Forum-Copenhagen Central-Amagerbro-Sundbyvester Plads-Tårnby-Dragør)

300S (Nærum-Lundtofte-Lyngby-Buddinge-Gladsaxe-Herlev-Glostrup-Vallensbæk-Ishøj)(This route will close in 2025 and be replaced by the under construction Light rail line on the same route)

350S (Ballerup-Lautrupparken-Herlev-Husum-Brønshøj-Bellahøj-Nørrebro-Nørreport)

400S (Lyngby-Bagsværd-Ballerup-Høje Taastrup-Ishøj)

500S (Kokkedal-Birkerød-Farum-Værløse-Ballerup-Glostrup-Brøndby Strand-Avedøre Holme-Ørestad)

600S (Hillerød-Slangerup-Ølstykke-Jyllinge-Roskilde-Tune-Hundige)

E-buses (in green): Express buses with limited schedules. Denoted with an E- on the end.

R-buses (in blue): Operates in rural regions, often alongside local trains as part of the R-net. A network of transit trunk corridors outside of the city with 30 minute frequencies throughout the daytime hours.

N-buses (grey on signs): Night buses. Denoted with an N- on the end.

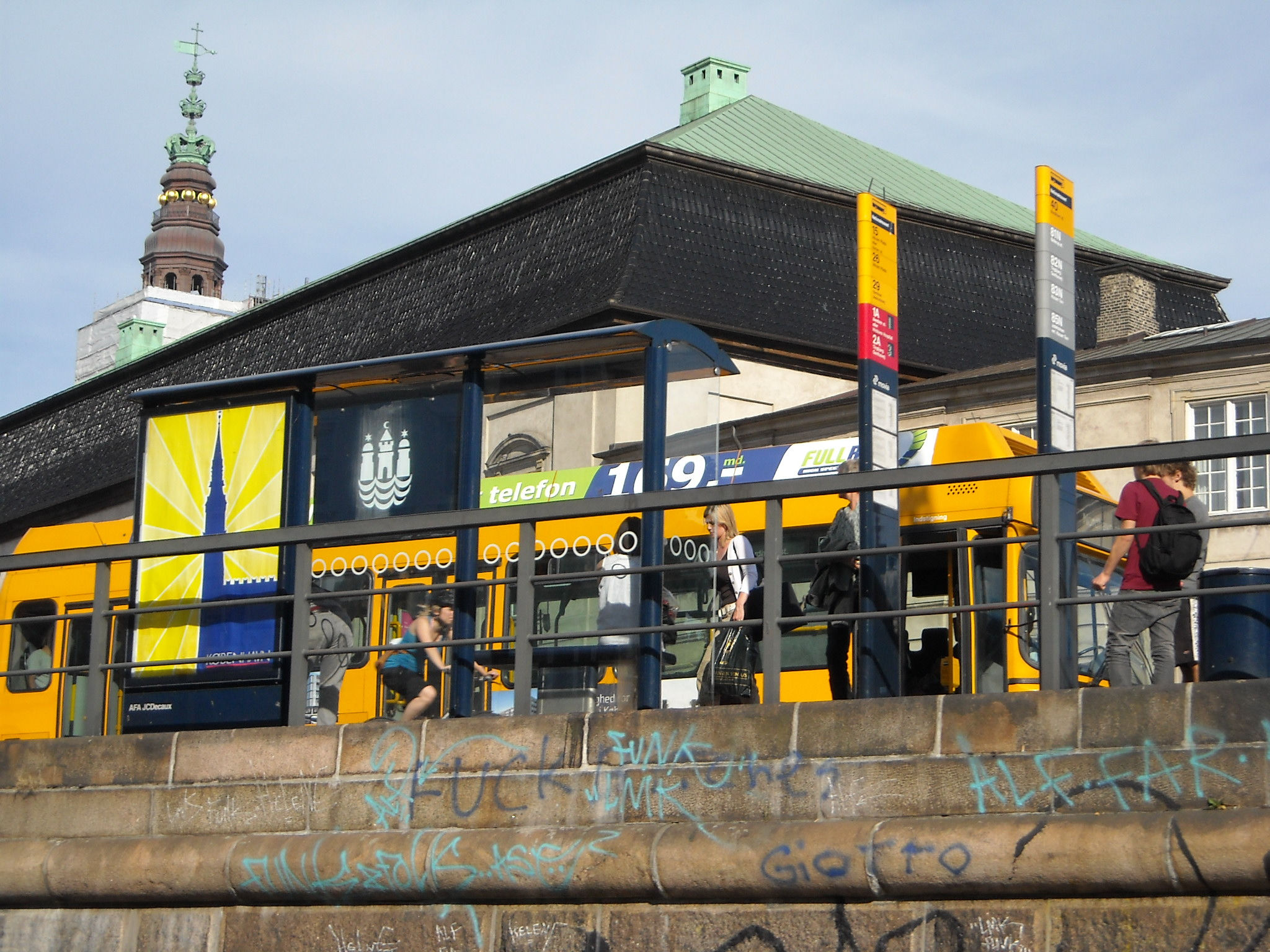
81N, 82N, 83N, 85N, 90N, 93N, 94N, 96N, 97N, 98N, 99N and others night buses 11, 19, 33, 35, 87, 101A, 102A, 200S, 201A, 202A, 245R, 260R, 326, 360R, 380R, 150S, 200S, 250S, 300S, 350S, 400S and 500S, 150, 200, 250, 300, 350, 400 and 500.

Ordinary-buses Typically all yellow. The service quality and frequency depends widely from line to line, from as frequent to every 10 minutes, to only a few departures a day.

BRT

Copenhagen already has one 2.5 kilometer long busway between Ryparken station and the lakes just past Rigshospitalet known as "Den Kvikke vej" (The Smart street). This busway opened in 2014 and is used by lines 6A, 15E, 150S, 184, 185 and 94N, featuring signal priority, median buslanes, and stops with a raised curb to make boarding easier.

Additionally 2 full scale BRT projects have been approved in the suburbs of Copenhagen. Specifically to upgrade lines 200S and 400S to full BRT with dedicated (mostly median) bus lanes along almost the entire corridor, a dedicated BRT service with larger than average buses, and upgraded station-like stops. It’s projected that these upgrades will make the lines significantly faster, in the case of 400S, 15 minutes faster between Lyngby and Ishøj. Additionally these upgrades will also include some changes to the routes, like routing the 400S BRT through Lautrupparken, Copenhagen's largest businesspark, and past Malmparken station on the S-train network. These infrastructure works are slated to begin in 2026 for both lines.

Additionally additional BRT studies and other bus improvement projects under Movia's "+way" umbrella are being done in the Greater Copenhagen area, including:

Studies for BRT and/or Light rail for the corridor Gladsaxe Trafikplads-Tingbjerg-Husum-Brønshøj-Bellahøj-Nørrebro (currently undecided)

BRT for line 150S (not granted funding)

+way for line 150S (currently not decided)

+way for line 500S for the corridor Brøndby Stadion-Brøndby Strand-Avedøre Holme (approved, finished by 2024)

Additionally Movia has published reports for several large towns and their local governments around the region for Bus improvements, using the same design language as their BRT projects.

Tivoli Shuttle

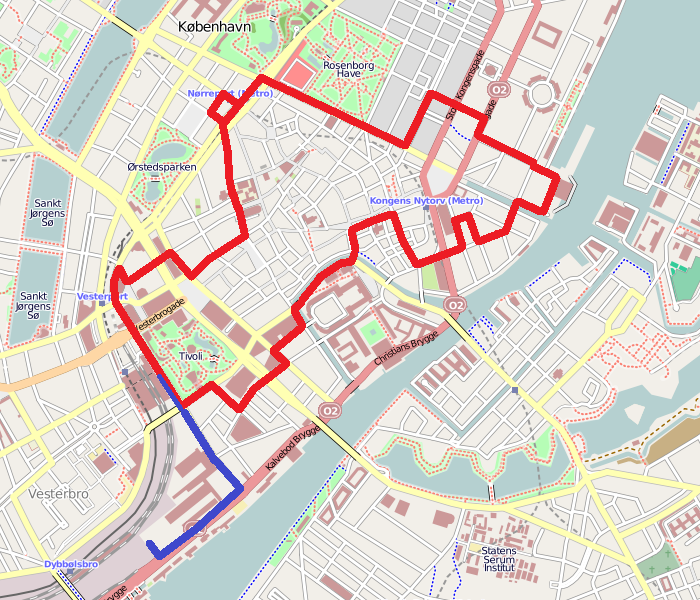
Copenhagen bus lines CityCirkel and Tivoli Shuttle

=== City Pass, central Copenhagen urban transit stations ===
The one figured ticket fare zones 1-4 constitutes an area known as the "City Pass" area. A City Pass is a ticket valid for all public transport within the City Pass area and can be purchased for a duration of 24, 48, 72 or 120 hours (1,2,3 or 5 days). From summer of 2019 (as the Circular line of the Metro, M3, and a smaller part of the Harbour line, M4, opens) there will be a total of 64 urban transit stations within the City Pass area. By type(s) of rail transport there will be:

- 30 stations with Metro service only.
- 21 stations with S-trains only.
- 1 station with Regional train service only.
- 4 stations with Metro and S-train (but no Regional train) service.
- 3 stations with S-train and Regional train (but no Metro) service.
- 2 stations with Metro and Regional train (but no S-train) service.
- 3 stations with Metro, S-train and Regional train service.
- Tally: 64 stations.

Another 5 Metro stations of the Harbour line (M4) are under construction and are scheduled to open in 2024. In the opposite end of that line (in the North), is an extension planned, but not decided. Still many attractions and inner city boroughs will still lack a nearby station, like Copenhagen Zoo, Copenhagen Opera and old block build districts like Hellerup, Brønshøj, and the densely populated Inner Nørrebro as well as the national hospital Rigshospitalet.

=== Domestic and international trains ===
Copenhagen Central Station provides Copenhagen with Intercity and Express trains across Denmark, as well as services to several international destinations. Re-tog regional trains (stops at major stations within the Greater Copenhagen area) connect the main parts of Zealand to the capital. Intercity trains run half-hourly from Copenhagen during daytime and serve as a link between the major cities and towns in Denmark, including Aarhus, Odense, Aalborg, Esbjerg, Randers, Kolding, Horsens, and Roskilde - the 10 biggest cities outside Copenhagen. Direct international trains connect to Stockholm, Hamburg and Berlin several times a day, and a EuroNight train served destinations as far as Prague, Amsterdam and Basel, but closed in November, 2014. Trains to southern and western Sweden depart every 20 minutes. (A special ticket fare system exists between the Copenhagen local traffic area and the most southern part of Sweden, Skåne county.)

=== Waterbus ===
Copenhagen has four lines of waterbuses, known as the Copenhagen Harbour Buses, serving ten water bus stops; four on the Amager-side and six on the Zealand-side of the harbour, from Sluseholmen in the South to Holmen in the North.

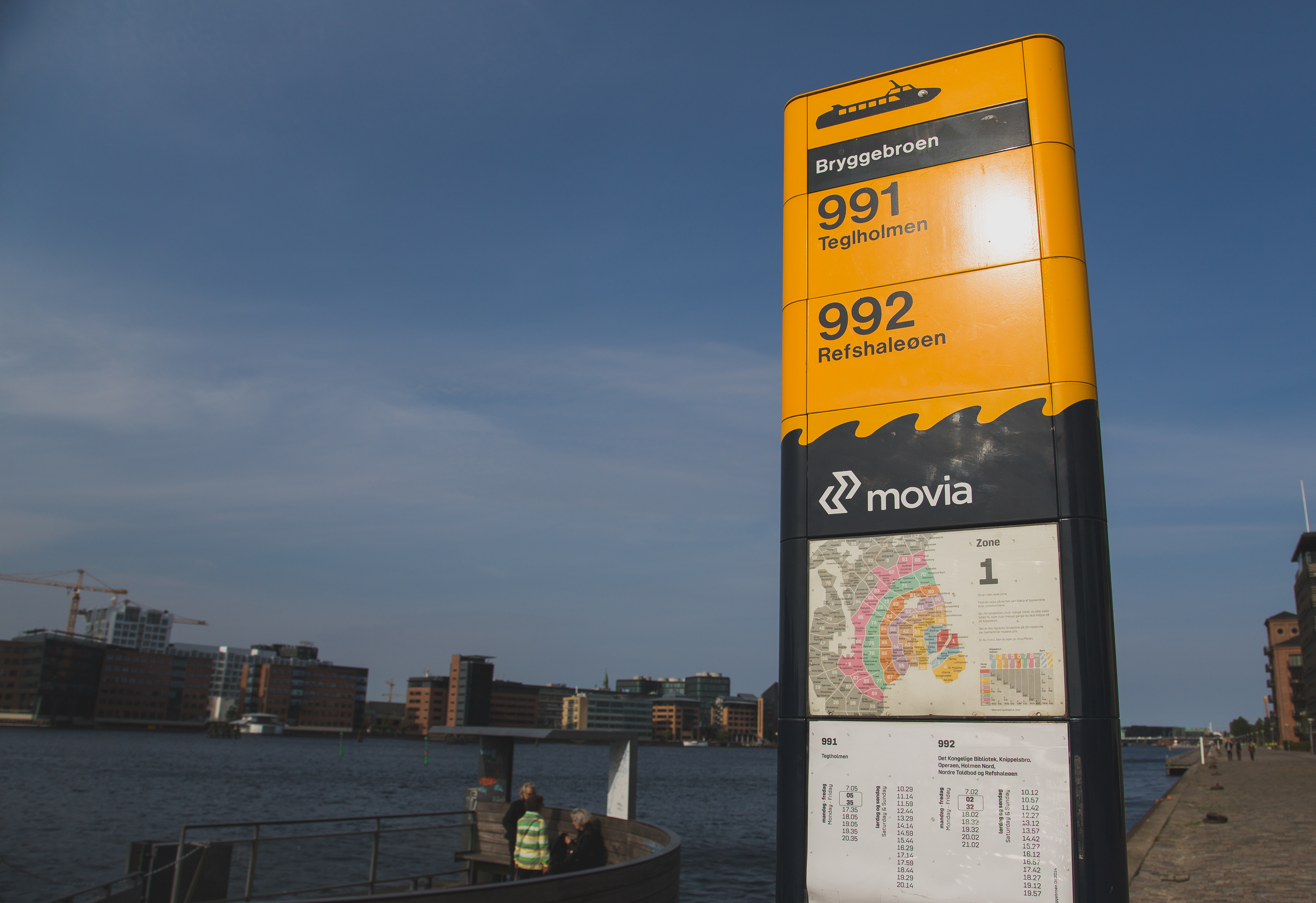

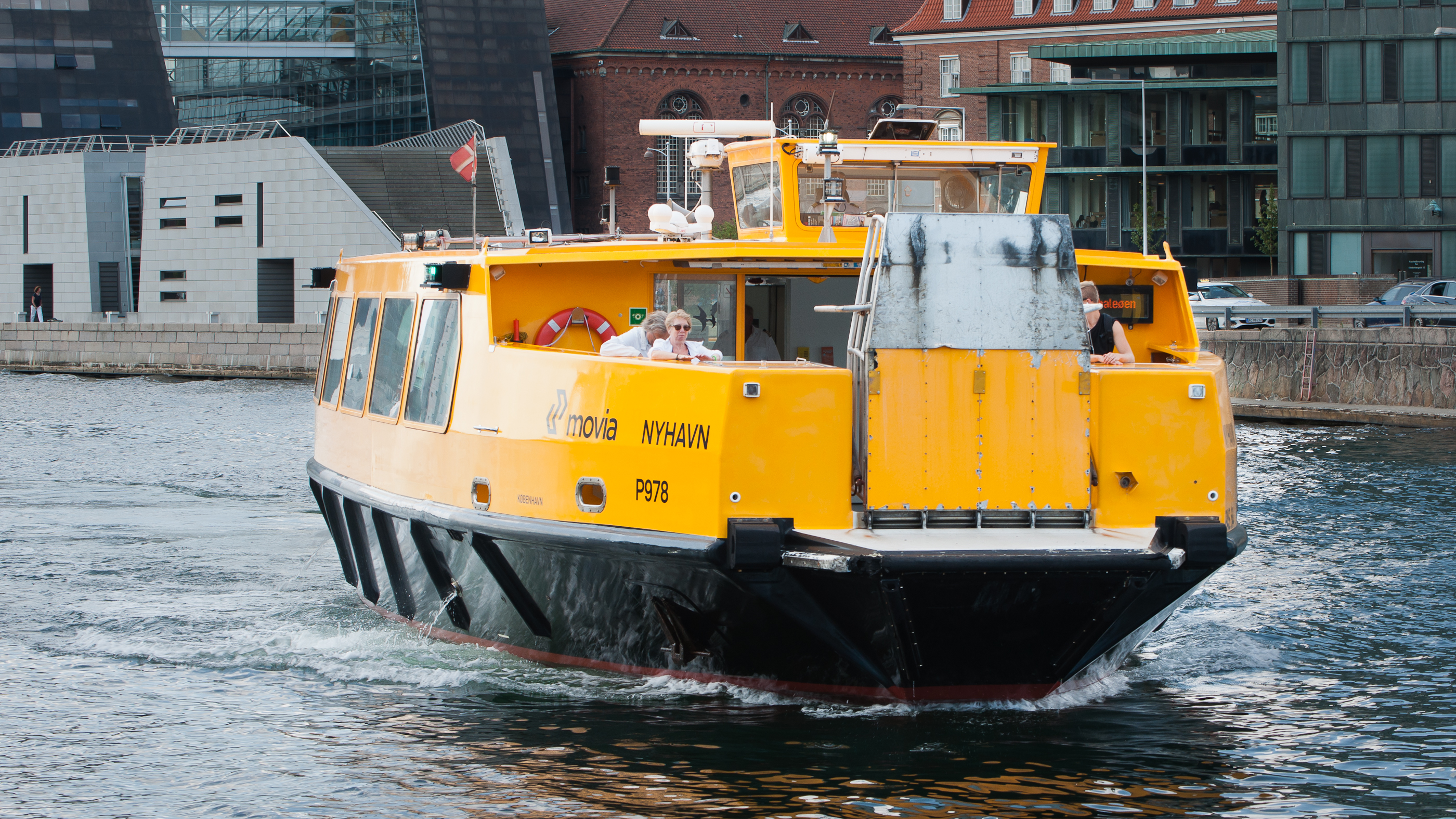

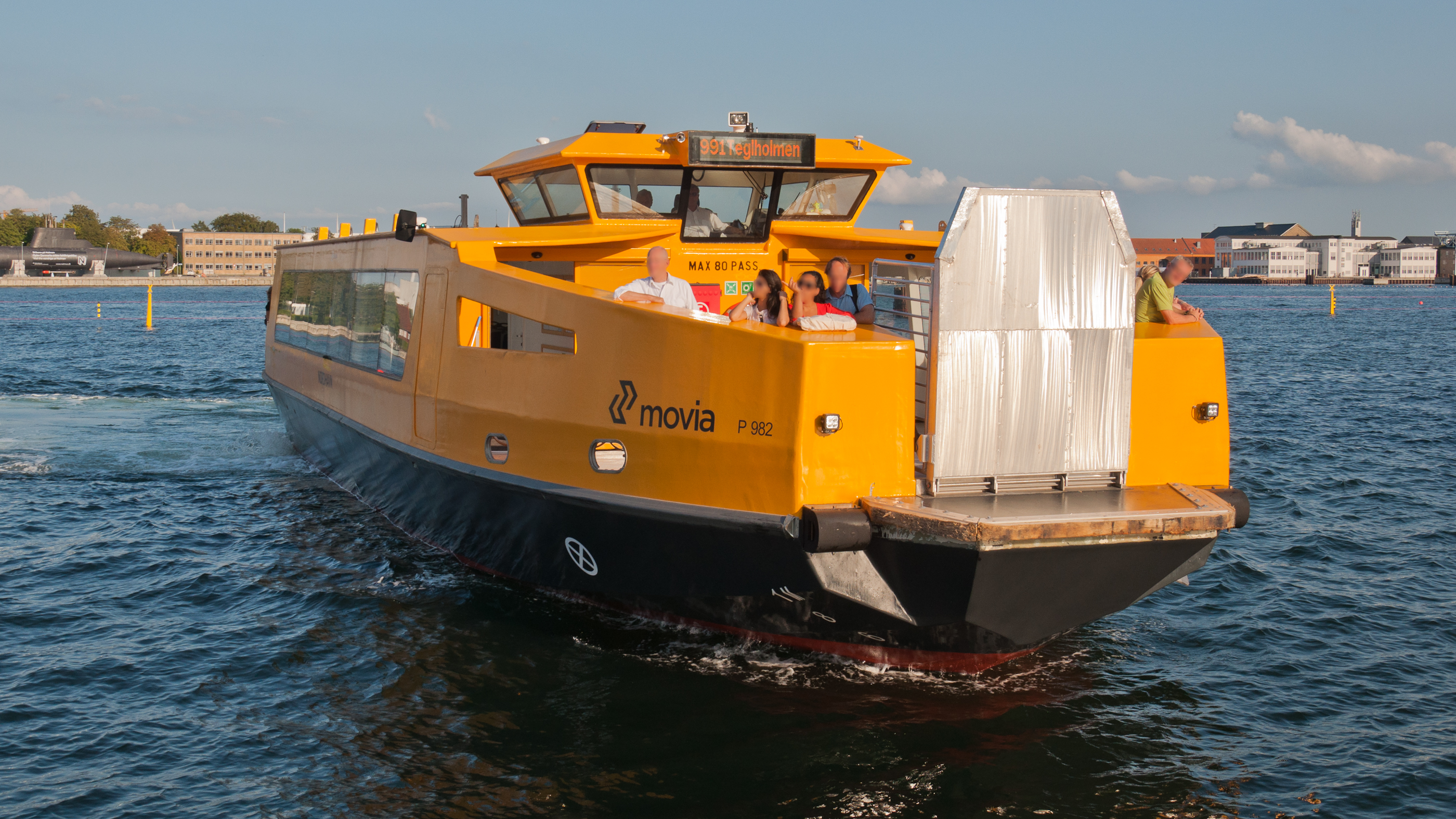

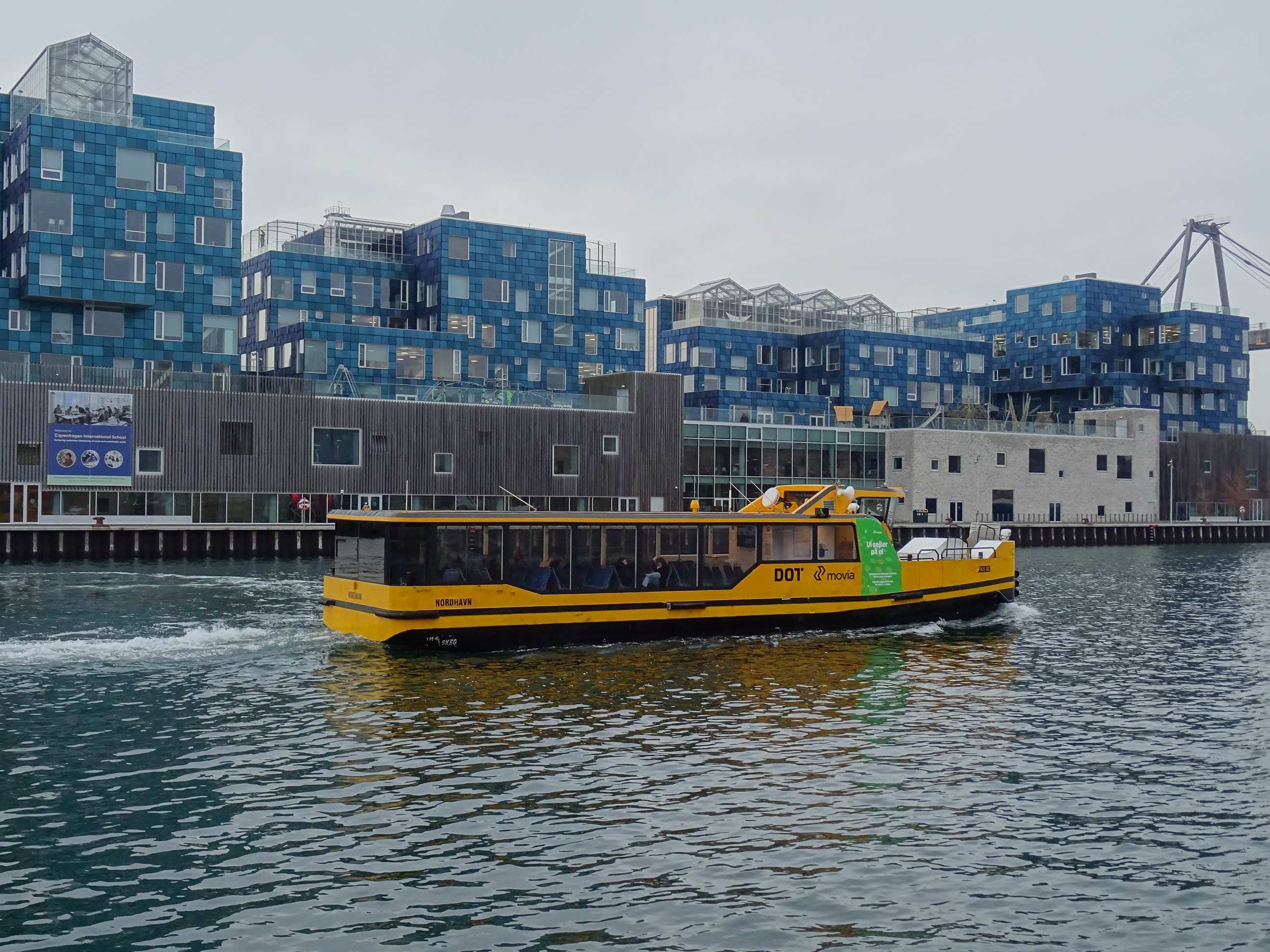

=== Intercity bus ===
The Copenhagen Bus Terminal, with intercity and international bus services, opened on 6 June 2024. Previously, most national and international buses that ran through the central city had their main stop in Ingerslevsgade, approximately 700 m north of the bus terminal.

=== Ticketing ===
There are 193 rail stations where most of them have connecting bus services. This link shows all lines, stations and fare zones. The Copenhagen local traffic area is divided in 95 zones. Zones 1, 2 and 3 make up the city core of Copenhagen. The same ticket is valid for travel on bus, train, and metro networks. Ticket machines are installed at all stations, and tickets can also be bought on buses and at ticket counters located at major stations. A ticket price inside the Copenhagen local traffic area is distance-dependent and always between two and nine zones (a nine zone ticket goes for all zones). The fine for not having a valid ticket is 750DKK.

Rejsekortet (lit. "the travel card") is an electronic ticket system for Danish public transport. The system is a collaborative work between DSB, HUR, Ørestadsselskabet, and various regional bus companies. It is similar to the Oyster card used in Greater London in England. The system will replace the current zone ticket system. Instead, fares will be calculated from the distance made from the beginning of the journey to the end, as the crow flies, so as to give a better correlation between price and distance travelled. However, technical difficulties have been reported on equipment not registering properly and people forgetting to check out after completion of their journey. Online user-friendliness and customer service have also taken criticism.

== Air ==
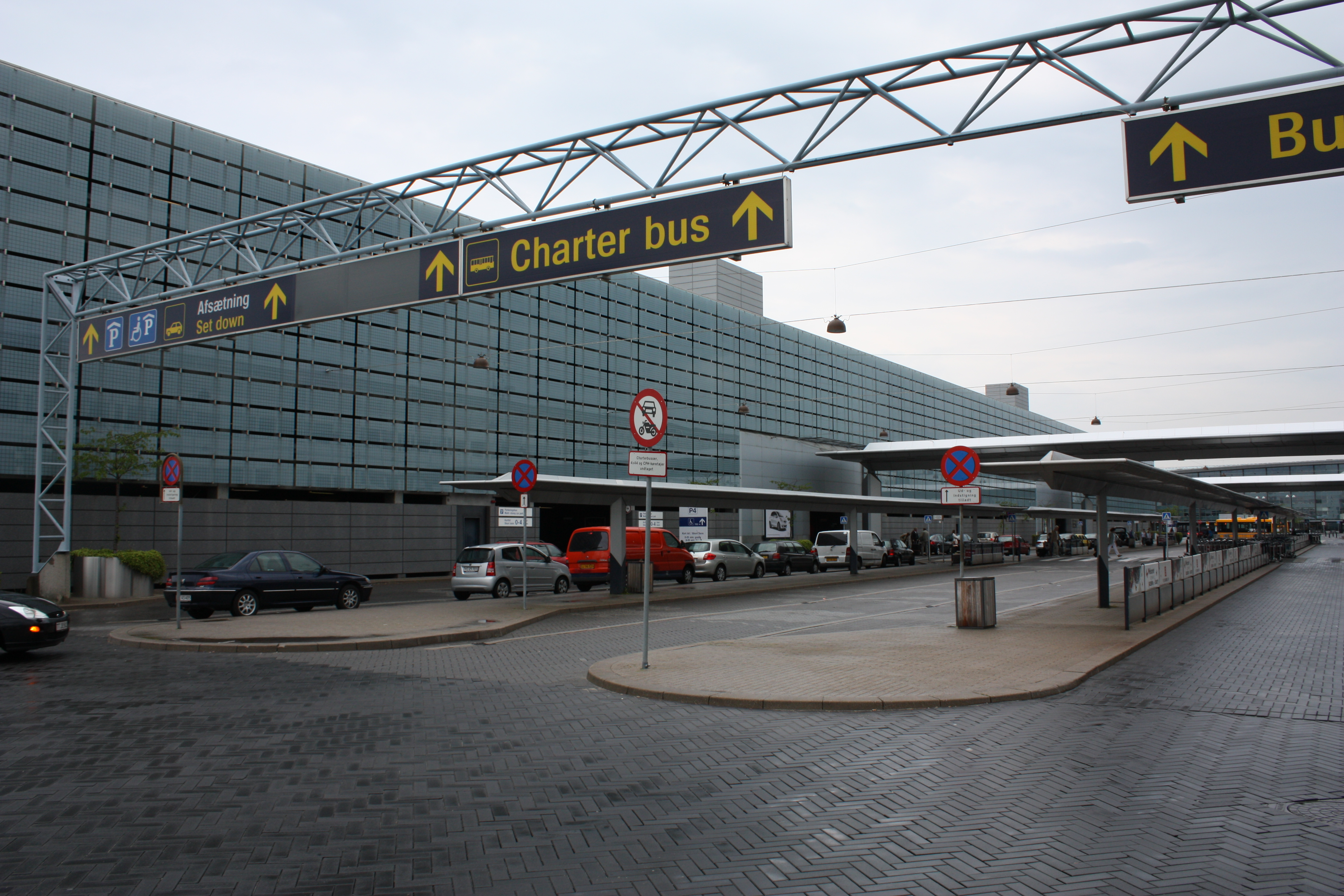
A view outside the Copenhagen Airport, Kastrup, the largest in Scandinavia

Copenhagen Airport (Danish: Københavns Lufthavn), officially, Copenhagen Airport, Kastrup (Københavns Lufthavn, Kastrup; IATA: CPH, ICAO: EKCH) is the main airport serving Copenhagen. It is the largest in Scandinavia and the 17th largest in Europe. Located in Kastrup on the island of Amager, it has efficient connections to downtown Copenhagen via metro and regional trains. Its location also makes it the most important international airport for large parts of southern Sweden. Copenhagen Airport is a major hub for SAS and Norwegian, and along with around 60 other airlines, it offers frequent flights to most major cities throughout Europe, as well as intercontinental flights to the United States, China, Thailand, northern Africa and United Arab Emirates.

Roskilde Airport (Danish: Roskilde Lufthavn), officially, Copenhagen Airport, Roskilde (Danish: Københavns Lufthavn, Roskilde); (IATA: RKE, ICAO: EKRK) is located 30 km (19 mi) west of Copenhagen with two runways with ILS equipment. It is primarily used for general aviation traffic, flight schools, business jets and occasional charter flights, but can be used by medium jets - although not always at full take-off weight. Plans for expanding Roskilde Airport have been approved, making it more suitable for regular flights of medium jets, such as those operated by most low-cost airlines and charter operators. However, a lack of firm commitment from airlines has postponed the expansion indefinitely.

A seaplane operates 4 times daily between Copenhagen harbour and Aarhus harbour.

== Sea ==
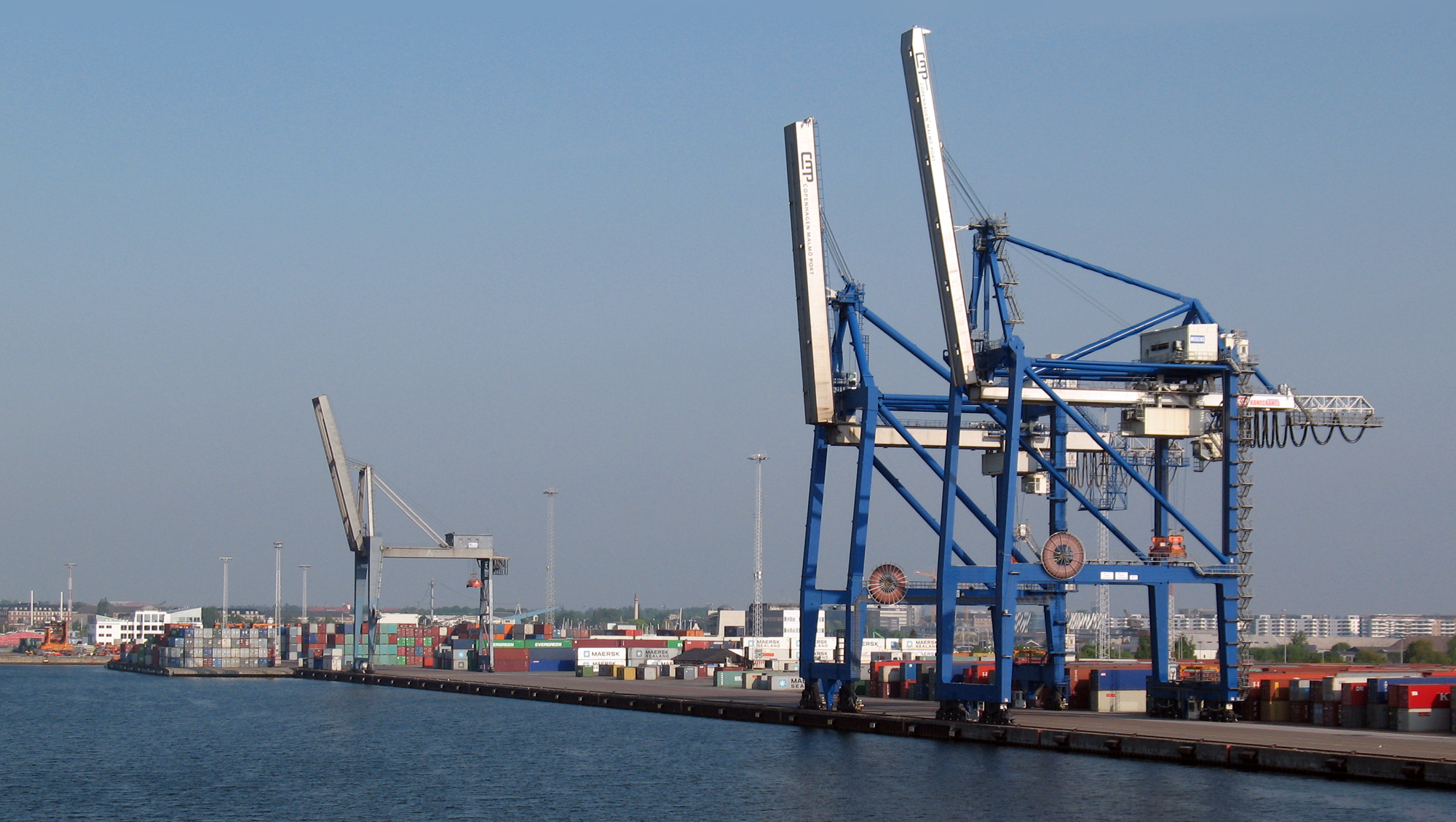
The Copenhagen container terminal

Copenhagen is served by ferry lines to Oslo in Norway (called "Oslobåden") with a daily connection. There is a ferry from Køge to Bornholm or alternatively by train to Ystad with connection to fast ferry to Bornholm.

The harbour of Copenhagen has largely lost its industrial importance. In 2001, Copenhagen Harbour as an organisation merged with the harbour in Malmö to create Copenhagen-Malmö Port. It has several functions, the most important being as a major cruise destination. In 2007 a record 286 cruise ships with 420,000 cruise passengers visited Copenhagen. 120 of these ships either started or ended the cruise in Copenhagen. In 2012 these numbers grew further to 372 cruise ships and 840,000 passengers.

At the World Travel Awards in 2012, Copenhagen Port was once again named Europe's leading cruise port after receiving the award every year since 2008.
