= Ishøj =

Town in Denmark near Copenhagen

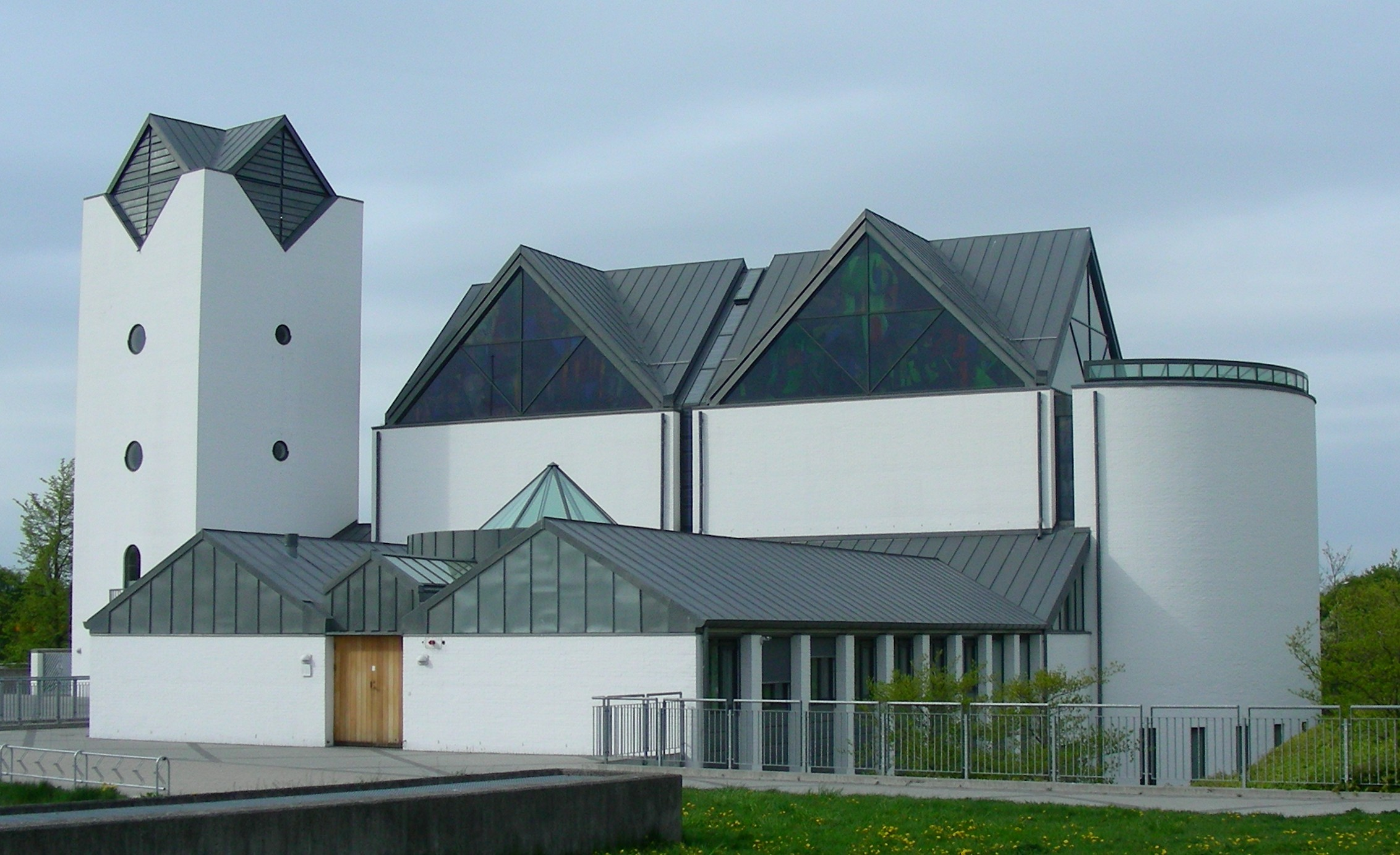
- Vejleå Church, the church in Ishøj

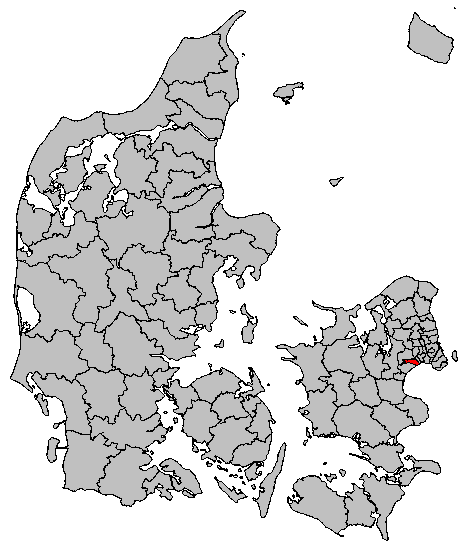
- Coordinates: 55°36′57″N 12°21′05″E
- Country: Denmark
- Region: Capital (Hovedstaden)
- Municipality: Ishøj

Government
  - Mayor: Merete Amdisen

Area
  - Total: 5.5 km^{2} (2.1 sq mi)

Population (1. January 2026)
  - Total: 22,371
  - Density: 4,100/km^{2} (11,000/sq mi)
- Time zone: UTC+1 (Central Europe Time)
  - Summer (DST): UTC+2

Ishøj is a Danish town with a population of 22,371 (1. January 2026). It is situated in the Region Hovedstaden, and is the seat of the Ishøj Municipality.

== Geography ==
The town is located by the coast in the southwestern suburban area of Copenhagen and is part of the city's urban area.

== Immigration ==
During the 1960s to 1980s, Denmark attracted a large number of foreign workers. Many of these workers chose to remain in the country, with a significant number settling in Ishøj, which is today known for its diverse population, with immigrants and their descendants accounting for 37.5 percent of the total population. This makes Ishøj the municipality with the highest proportion of immigrants in Denmark.

The influx of immigrants has also had an impact on the local schools, with some municipal schools having over 30 percent of students who are bilingual. Ishøj has a high proportion of young people.

== Notable people ==
- Karen Ankersted (1859 in Ishøj – 1921) a Danish teacher and pioneering female politician.
- Helle Thorning-Schmidt (born 1966) former Prime Minister of Denmark and Chief Executive of Save the Children, attended Ishøj Gymnasium
- Pia Olsen Dyhr (born 1971) a Danish politician who attended Ishøj Gymnasium
- Nadia Alawa (born 1971 in Ishøj) the founder and current CEO of the non-profit NuDay
- Peter Corp Dyrendal (born 1976 in Ishøj) a Danish-Thai descent singer, recording artist, actor and model
- ZK (born 2000 in Ishøj), stage name of Zaman Kilic, a Danish rapper

=== Sport ===
- Camilla Kur Larsen (born 1989 in Ishøj) a Danish professional soccer player
- Riza Durmisi (born 1994 in Ishøj) a Danish professional footballer
- Ertuğrul Tekşen (born 2000 in Ishøj) a Danish-born Turkish footballer who plays for TFF Third League club Belediye Kütahyaspor
- Zidan Sertdemir (born 2005 in Ishøj) a Danish-born Turkish footballer who plays for Bayer Leverkusen.

== See also ==
- Listed buildings in Ishøj Municipality
- Benzonsdal
- Ishøj Gymnasium
