= Ishøj Gymnasium =

Coordinates: 55.6173°N 12.3679°E

Location
- Vejlebrovej 65, 2635 Ishøj, Denmark

Information
- School type: Gymnasium
- Established: 1982
- Status: Closed
- Succeeded by: Sydkysten Gymnasium

Ishøj Gymnasium was a secondary school located in Ishøj near Copenhagen, Denmark.

The school was originally run by the County of Copenhagen, but was acquired by a private organization, CPH West, in 2007. When CPH West merged with Copenhagen Technical College to form NEXT Uddannelse København in 2016, the school was dissolved. Today, the campus is known as Sydkysten Gymnasium.

== NEXT Uddannelse København ==
NEXT, is the largest system of gymnasiums and vocational schools in Denmark with around 7,000 students across 12 campuses in the Greater Copenhagen area. The schools offer all four standard Danish upper-secondary programs: Higher Technical Examination Programme, Higher Commercial Examination Programme, General Upper Secondary School Leaving Certificate, and Higher Preparatory Examination. Over 40 vocational programs are also offered in addition to eux programs, post graduation courses, and an optional 10th grade.

NEXT has six technical campuses in Emdrup, Glostrup, Herlev, Rødovre, and two in Nørrebro. The system has six gymnasiums across Greater Copenhagen, and their main offices are located at Sukkertoppen Gymnasium.

Gymnasiums:

- Baltorp Gymnasium and Business Campus in Ballerup
- Københavns Mediegymnasium in Frederiksberg
- Sukkertoppen Gymnasium in Valby
- Sydkysten Gymnasium in Ishøj (formerly Ishøj Gymnasium)
- Vestskoven Gymnasium in Albertslund (formerly Albertslund Gymnasium)
- Vibenshus Gymnasium in Østerbro

== Notable students ==
- Pia Olsen Dyhr – Danish politician
- Helle Thorning Schmidt – Denmark's first female prime minister
- Waqas Ali Qadri – Member of Outlandish
