= Helle Thorning-Schmidt =

Prime Minister of Denmark from 2011 to 2015

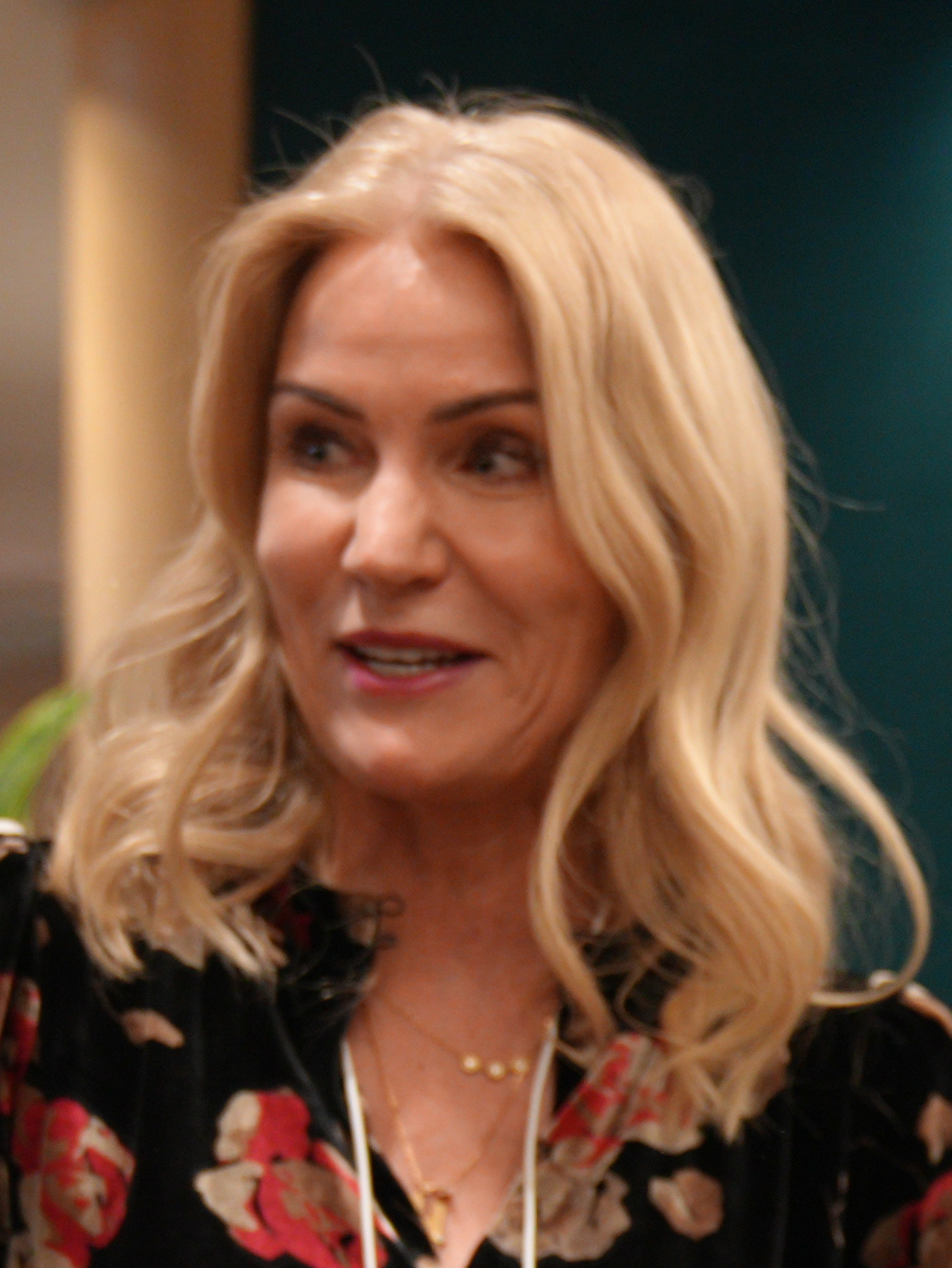
- Thorning-Schmidt in 2024

Prime Minister of Denmark
- In office 3 October 2011 – 28 June 2015
- Monarch: Margrethe II
- Preceded by: Lars Løkke Rasmussen
- Succeeded by: Lars Løkke Rasmussen

Leader of the Social Democrats
- In office 12 April 2005 – 28 June 2015
- Deputy: Frank Jensen; Mogens Jensen
- Preceded by: Mogens Lykketoft
- Succeeded by: Mette Frederiksen

Personal details
- Born: 14 December 1966 (age 59) Copenhagen, Denmark
- Party: Social Democrats
- Other political affiliations: Labour Party (UK)
- Spouse: Stephen Kinnock (m. 1996)
- Children: 2
- Education: University of Copenhagen (cand.scient.pol.); College of Europe (MA)

Helle Thorning-Schmidt (Danish: [ˈhelə ˈtsʰoɐ̯ne̝ŋ ˈsme̝t]; born 14 December 1966) is a Danish retired politician who served as the prime minister of Denmark from 2011 to 2015 and leader of the Social Democrats from 2005 to 2015. She is the first woman to have held each post. Following defeat in 2015, she announced that she would step down as both prime minister and party leader. Ending her political career in April 2016, she was the chief executive of the NGO Save the Children until June 2019.

Thorning-Schmidt served as a member of the European Parliament (MEP) for Denmark from 1999 to 2004 before being elected to the Danish Parliament in 2005. She was elected to replace Mogens Lykketoft as leader of the Social Democrats after the 2005 parliamentary election, leading her party through the 2007 parliamentary election, which was won by the centre-right alliance, and the 2011 parliamentary election, after which she was appointed prime minister by Queen Margrethe II, and the 2015 election. Thorning-Schmidt holds a degree in political science from the University of Copenhagen and a master's degree from the College of Europe.

Since 2020, Thorning-Schmidt has served as a co-chair of the Meta Oversight Board. She is married to Stephen Kinnock, the Secretary of State for Wales in the United Kingdom.

== Early life and education ==
Helle Thorning-Schmidt was born in Rødovre to Holger Thorning-Schmidt, a lecturer in mathematics and national economics at the University of Copenhagen, and his wife Grete. Her father was politically conservative and she grew up in the Copenhagen suburb of Ishøj. She attended Ishøj Gymnasium from which she graduated in 1985. Her parents divorced when she was 10 years old.

Thorning-Schmidt studied political science at University of Copenhagen, earning a cand.scient.pol. degree in 1994. She also holds a master's degree in European studies specialising in policy and public administration from the College of Europe in Bruges, Belgium, where she studied from 1992 to 1993 (she is an alumna of the Charles IV promotion). At the time, Denmark had a quota administered by the Ministry of Foreign Affairs of one student at this prestigious institution, and Thorning-Schmidt was selected. In addition to her native Danish, she speaks English, and French.

She became a social democrat during her studies in Belgium and joined the Social Democratic Party in 1993.

== Political career ==
=== European Parliament ===
From 1994 to 1997, Thorning-Schmidt led the secretariat of the Danish delegation of Social Democrats in the European Parliament. After her time in Brussels she worked as an international consultant with the Danish Confederation of Trade Unions until being elected MEP in 1999.

Thorning-Schmidt was elected to the European Parliament as a member of the Party of European Socialists. During the five-year term, she was a member of the Employment and Social Committee and served as a substitute on the Constitutional Committee. She co-founded the Campaign for Parliament Reform (CPR).

=== Member of the Folketing ===
In the 2005 Danish parliamentary election Thorning-Schmidt was elected to the Folketing.

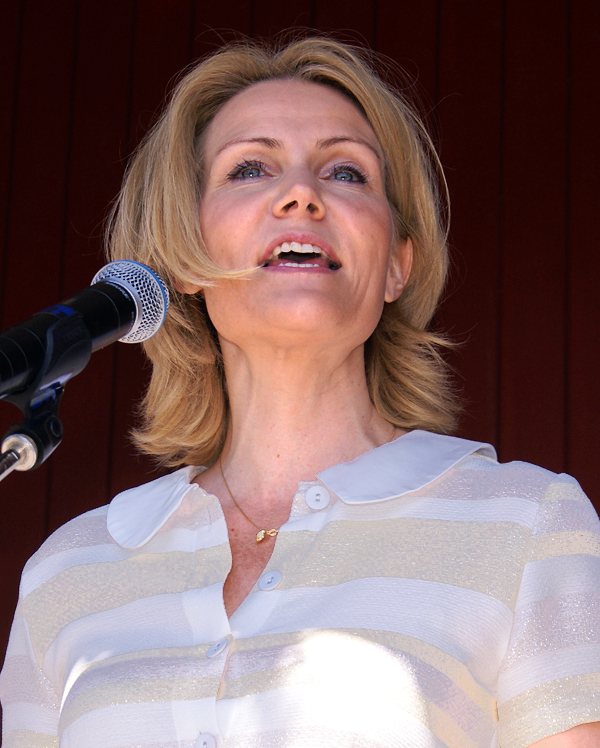
Thorning-Schmidt in 2008, as leader of the opposition

Following the defeat in the 2005 election, in which the Social Democrats lost five seats and failed to regain the majority it had lost in the 2001 election, former Minister of Finance and party leader Mogens Lykketoft resigned his post, taking responsibility for the poor election results. In his speech of resignation on election night, 8 February 2005, he called for a leadership election in order to determine who should lead the party into the next election.

Thorning-Schmidt campaigned for the party leadership as a moderate candidate and was elected by the party members on 12 April 2005, ahead of the other candidate, Frank Jensen. She led the Social Democrats in the 2007 election, in which her party suffered modest losses and was forced into a third term in opposition. The party was also unable to regain its position as the largest party in the Folketing.

She was against holding a referendum on the European Reform Treaty. During her 2007 campaign she promised to relax restrictions on asylum seekers and immigrants. She also opposed tax cuts announced by Anders Fogh Rasmussen, instead stating she would like to see more funding for welfare. The party also campaigned on a platform of combating increased inequalities in society, and fighting global warming by supplying 45% of Denmark's energy from renewable sources by 2025.

Although her party again lost two seats in the 2007 election reducing the total to 45 seats, her leadership was not questioned by her party. In June 2008, according to a Gallup poll, the opposition centre-left was at 49.8% compared to 49.6% for the centre-right. This would leave the centre-left with 88 seats, two short of a majority, discounting the Faroe Island and Greenland seats. Since late 2009 the opposition enjoyed large majorities in the polls, and according to polls carried out in January 2011 the opposition led the governing coalition under Lars Løkke Rasmussen by 5–7 points and the Social Democrats led Venstre by 7–10 points which would make the Social Democrats the largest party by far in the Folketing.

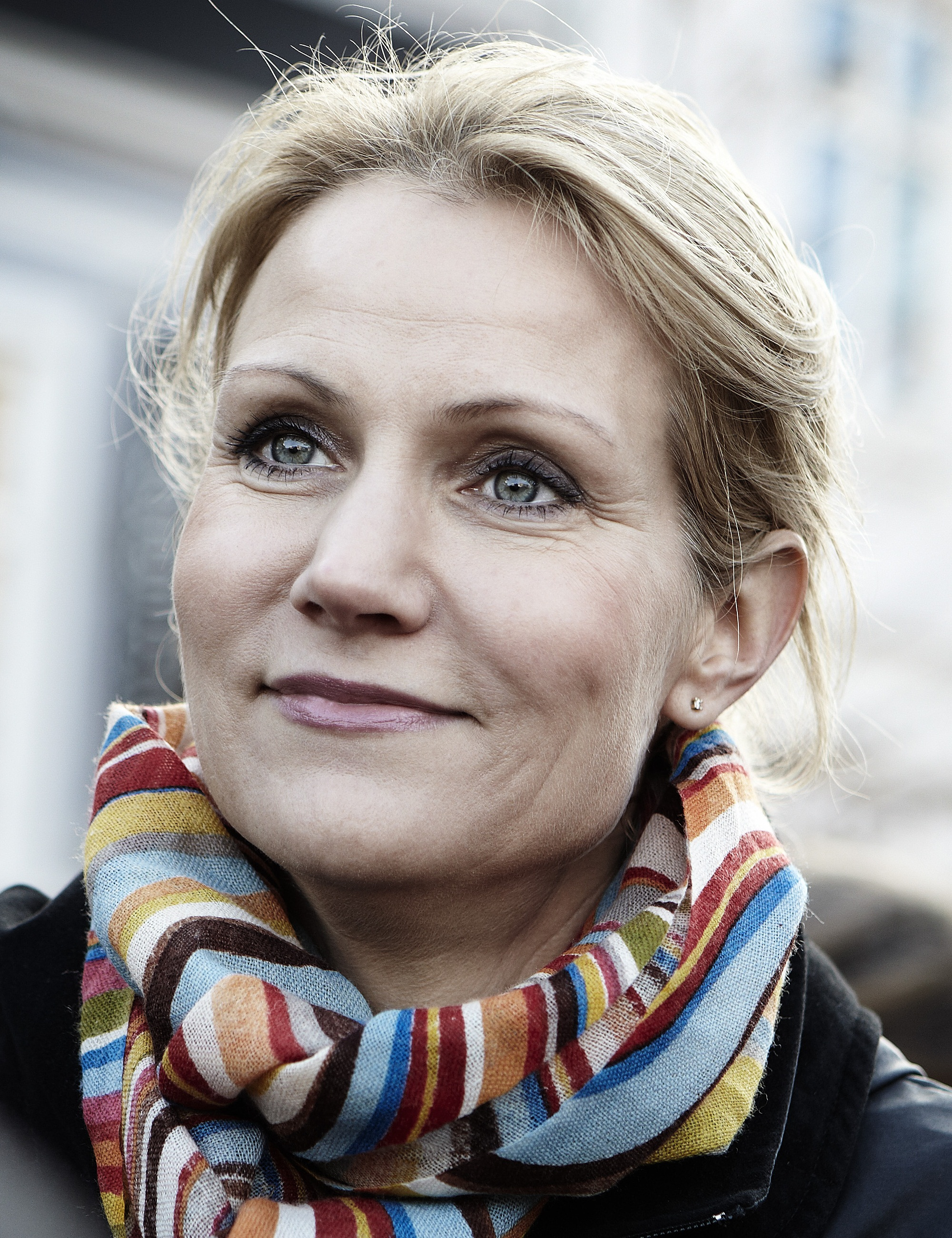
Helle Thorning-Schmidt in 2010

Both Margrethe Vestager (Social Liberal Party) and Villy Søvndal (Socialist People's Party) pledged their support to Thorning-Schmidt after a potential election victory. After the 2007 election Helle Thorning-Schmidt started working towards forming a centre-left government coalition consisting of the Socialist People's Party and the Social Liberal Party with parliamentary support from the small Red-Green Alliance. As the leader of the largest opposition party in Denmark, she was described by the media as the leader of the Danish opposition.

== Prime Minister of Denmark ==
=== 2011 Danish election ===
In the 2011 parliamentary election, she was re-elected to parliament. Although the ruling Liberal Party became the largest party and gained a seat and the Social Democrats lost a seat, the opposition parties combined obtained more seats than the government coalition. Her four-party bloc gained a majority of 89 seats in the 179-seat parliament against 86 for the sitting prime minister and his center-right parliamentary supporters. Prime Minister Lars Løkke Rasmussen formally tendered his resignation to Queen Margrethe on 16 September 2011. Rasmussen's cabinet remained in office as a caretaker government until 3 October, when Helle Thorning-Schmidt was appointed prime minister by the Queen following negotiations with the other opposition parties.

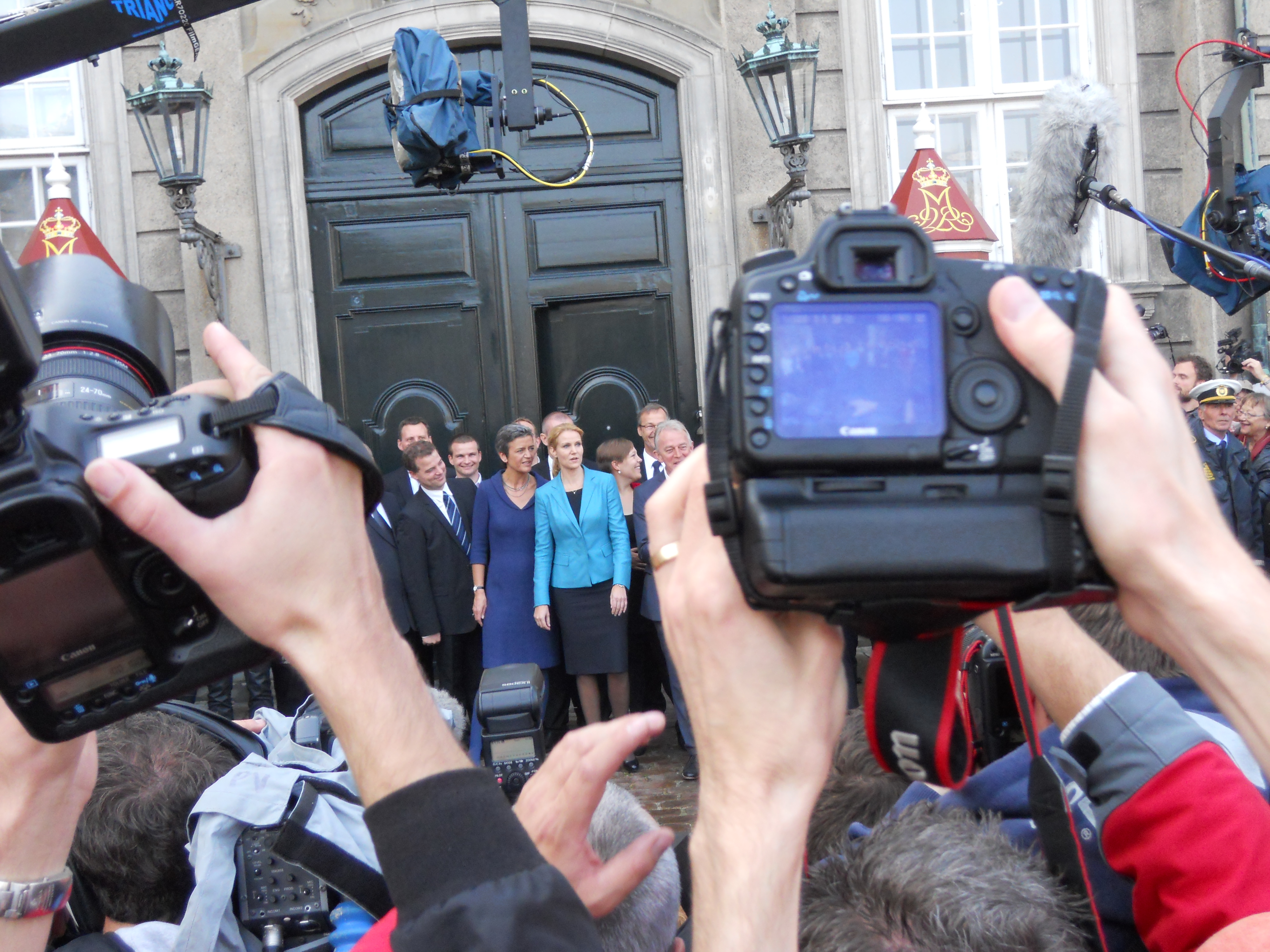
The first Cabinet presented at Amalienborg

=== First Cabinet ===
Helle Thorning-Schmidt officially began her first term as prime minister on 3 October 2011, after having presented her cabinet to the Queen and having received her official appointment. Thorning-Schmidt pursued a centrist compromise agenda, building several reforms with support from both sides of the Folketing. This caused friction with the supporting Red-Green Alliance, which was kept outside of influence.

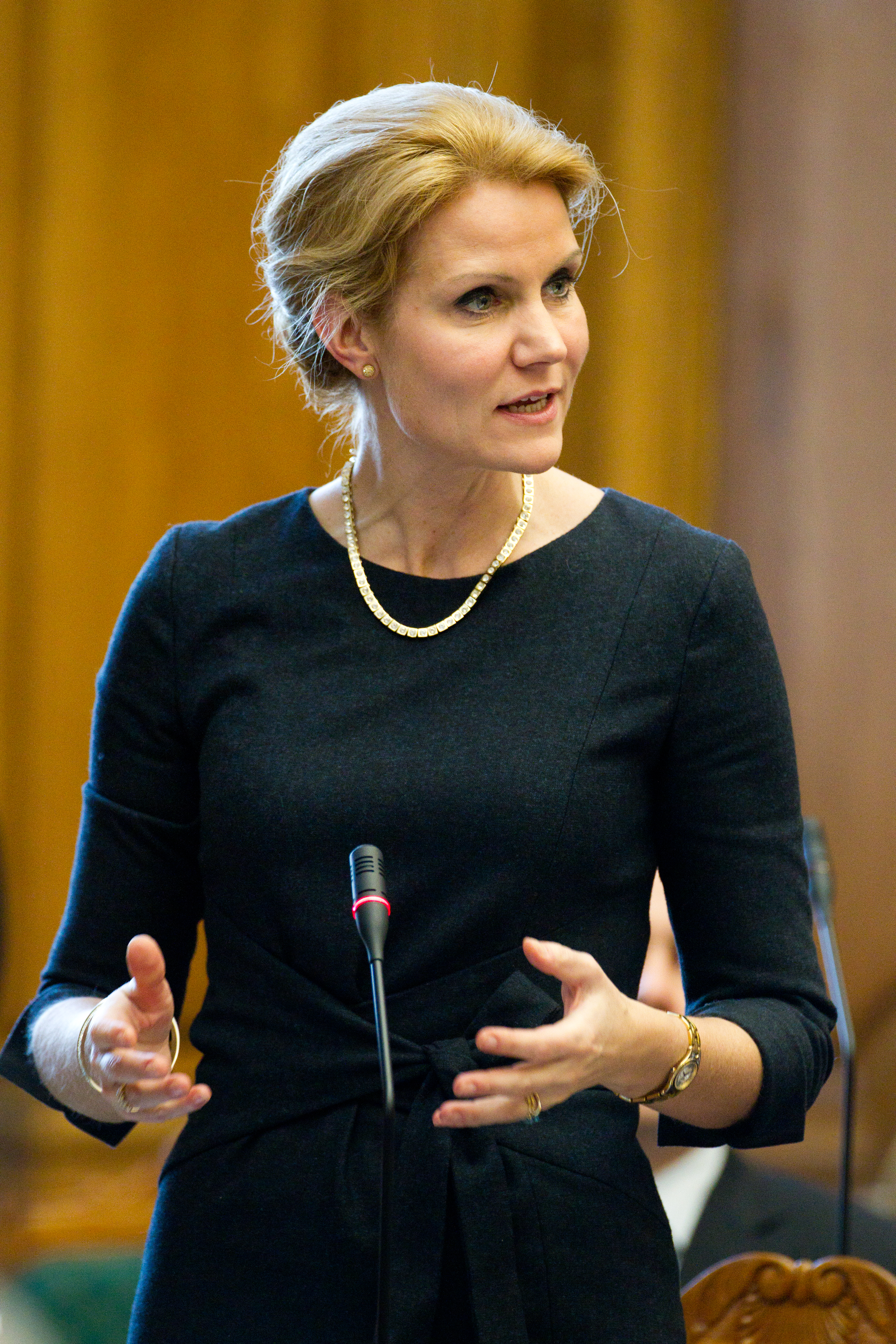
Thorning-Schmidt in 2011

Thorning-Schmidt presided over the successful conclusion of NATO's strike missions in Libya, to which Denmark was a contributor, less than three weeks after taking office.

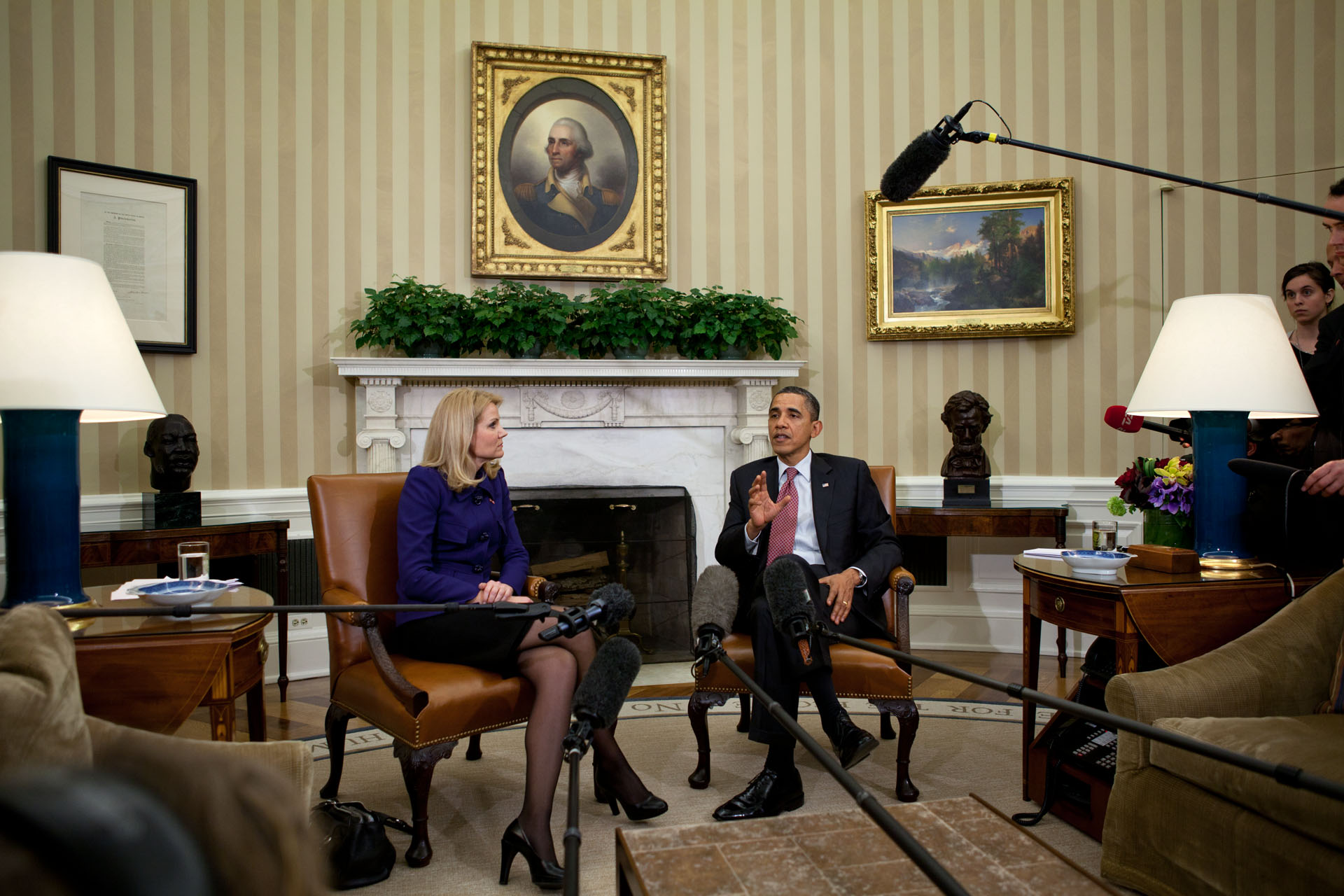
Thorning-Schmidt meets with U.S. President Barack Obama in Washington, D.C., 24 February 2012

During the first year in office her government rolled back anti-immigration legislation enacted by the previous government, and passed a tax reform with support from the liberal-conservative opposition. The tax reform raised the top tax threshold, effectively lowering tax rates for high income earners. The aim of the tax reform was to increase labour output to fend off a projected shortage within the next decades. The stated goal was to entice Danes to work more in order to compensate for the decreasing workforce, by lowering tax on wages and gradually lowering welfare payments to those outside of the labour market to increase the economic benefit of working relative to receiving welfare. Despite effectively lowering tax rates on high income earners, tax revenue continued to increase from 831,172 million Krone in 2011, to 901,001 million Krone in 2013, and eventually reached 954,473 million Krone in 2015 by the end of her time in office. These effective reductions were in line with the 2009 tax reforms of Anders Fogh Rasmussen, a Venstre prime minister preceding her, which is likely why she received liberal-conservative support.

On 9 August and 12 December 2013, amid tensions between coalition partners, Thorning-Schmidt made cabinet reshuffles.

=== Second Cabinet ===
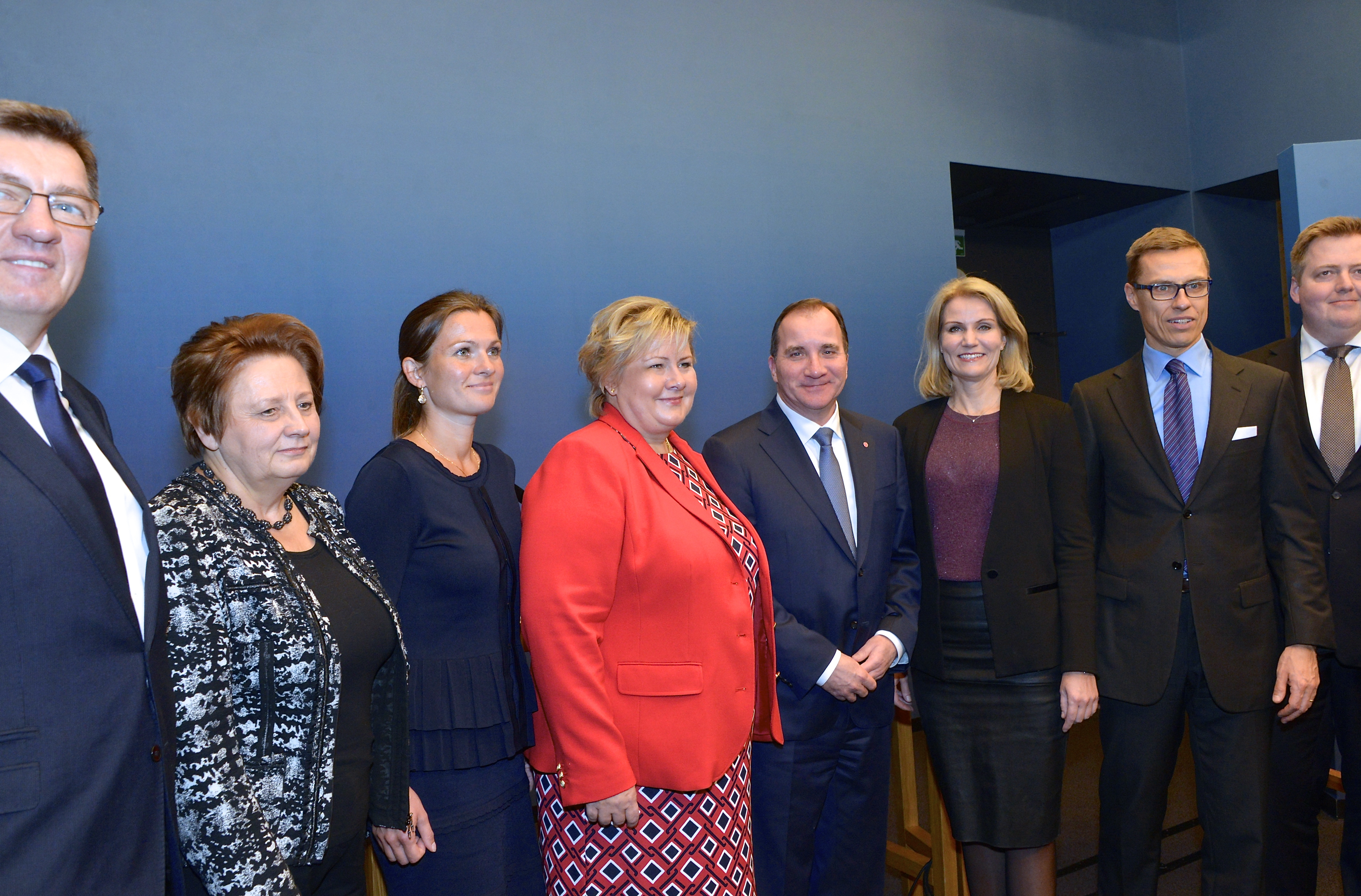
Thorning-Schmidt with heads of government from the Nordic countries

On 30 January 2014, the Socialist People's Party announced their departure from Thorning-Schmidt's government due to a conflict over the proposed sale of DONG Energy shares to Goldman Sachs. Before departure, they also announced they will support Thorning-Schmidt although not being a part of her government.

Thorning-Schmidt led her party into the 2015 general election in which her party increased its share of votes and seats. However, the Social Liberals lost nine seats, leaving the left bloc without enough support to remain in office. Within an hour of the results being declared, she announced her resignation as both prime minister and leader of the Social Democrats.

== Electoral history ==
Thorning was the leader of the Social Democrats through seven electoral campaigns.

Year	Type	Votes	%	Change in %	Seats	Change in Seats
2005	Local	986,829	34.3	+1.5	900	—N/a
2007	General	881,037	25.5	−0.3	45	−2
2009	European	503,439	21.5	−11.1	4	−1
2009	Local	853,221	30.6	−4.9	801	−99
2011	General	879,615	24,8	−0.7	44	−1
2013	Local	919,574	29.5	−1.1	773	−28
2014	European	435,245	19.1	−2.4	3	−1
2015	General	925,635	26.3	+1.5	47	+3

== Life after politics ==
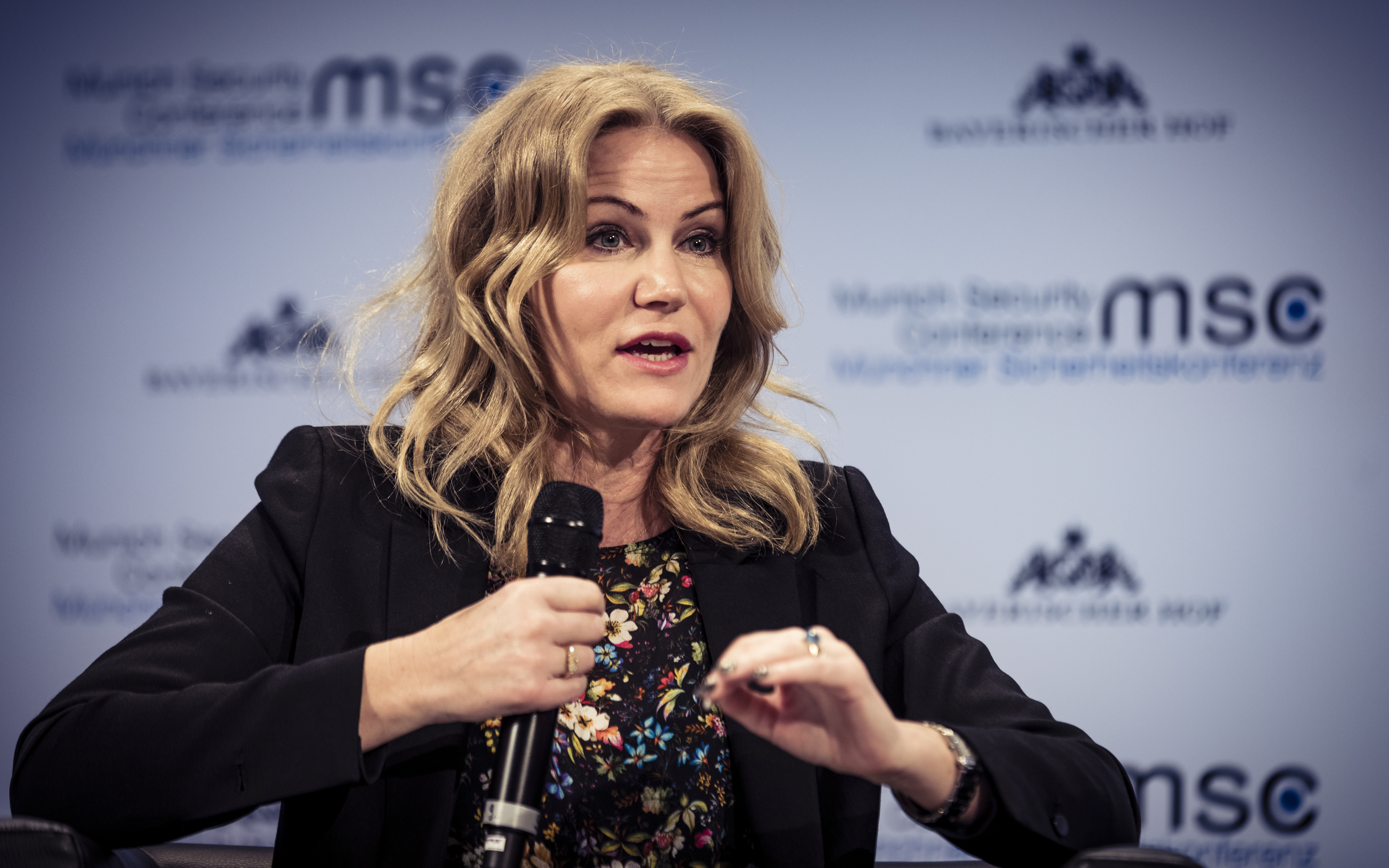
Thorning-Schmidt during the MSC 2019

Having lost the Danish general election of 2015, Thorning-Schmidt stepped down as prime minister and as leader of the Social Democratic Party. It was announced that she would become her party's member of the Presidium of the Folketing, and she served as the Presidium's 1st Vice-President. On 4 September 2015, Prime Minister Lars Løkke Rasmussen announced that the Danish government had nominated Thorning-Schmidt as Denmark's official candidate to the position as new United Nations High Commissioner for Refugees.

After her retirement from Danish politics, Thorning-Schmidt served as the CEO of Save the Children from 2016 until 2019.

Following the resignation of Ghassan Salamé as head of the United Nations Support Mission in Libya (UNSMIL) in 2020, the American Government proposed Thorning-Schmidt as special envoy to focus on mediating peace in Libya; according to media reports, however, she withdrew herself shortly after.

In May 2020, Thorning-Schmidt joined the Facebook Oversight Group, established as an independent entity within Facebook, Inc. She was appointed as a full board member (one of twenty) who as a board have initially adjudicated on deleted Facebook posts in 2021.

Also in 2020, Thorning-Schmidt was appointed by the World Health Organization's Regional Office for Europe to serve as a member of the Pan-European Commission on Health and Sustainable Development, chaired by Mario Monti. From 2021 to 2022, she was a member of the Trilateral Commission's Task Force on Global Capitalism in Transition, chaired by Carl Bildt, Kelly Grier and Takeshi Niinami.

In addition, Thorning-Schmidt has held several other paid and unpaid positions, including:

- Friends of Europe, Member of the Board of Trustees (since 2020)
- Vestas, Member of the Board of Directors (since 2019)
- DBU's Women Commission to promote women's football in Denmark, Chairperson of the commission (since 2016)
- International Commission on Financing Global Education Opportunity (led by Gordon Brown), Member (since 2015)
- United Nations High-level Advisory Group for Every Woman Every Child, Member (since 2016)
- International Crisis Group, Member of the Board of Trustees (since 2016)
- Atlantic Council, Member of the International Advisory Board
- Council on Foreign Relations (CFR), Member of the Global Board of Advisors
- Scaling Up Nutrition Movement, Member of the Lead Group (since 2016, appointed by United Nations Secretary-General Ban Ki-moon)
- Berggruen Institute, Member of the 21st Century Council
- European Council on Foreign Relations (ECFR), Member
- Center for Global Development, Member of the European Advisory Group
- Schwab Foundation for Social Entrepreneurship, Member of the Board
- Progressives Zentrum, Member of the Circle of Friends
- Palo Alto Networks, Member of the Board of Directors (since Feb. 2025)

== Personal life ==
Thorning-Schmidt married Welsh politician Stephen Kinnock in 1996, becoming the daughter-in-law of Neil Kinnock, former Leader of the Opposition and leader of the British Labour Party and European Commissioner, and Glenys Kinnock, former British Minister for Europe. Thorning-Schmidt met her husband while they were both attending the College of Europe. They have two children, daughter Johanna and child Milo. Milo came out as transgender and non-binary in 2022. At the time of her election as Prime Minister, Thorning-Schmidt lived in Copenhagen with their children, while Kinnock partly resided in Davos, Switzerland, where he worked as a director for the World Economic Forum. In 2014, he worked for London-based Xyntéo as managing director for the "Global Leadership and Technology Exchange", but was elected Member of Parliament (MP) for Aberavon at the 2015 general election. The family have been living in Kilburn, London since Thorning-Schmidt became CEO of Save the Children, whilst also spending time at Kinnock's constituency in Port Talbot. Thorning-Schmidt has also campaigned for her husband and for the British Labour Party.

Although Thorning-Schmidt has been baptized into the Church of Denmark, she is not confirmed. She occasionally goes to church but does not believe in eternal life, salvation, heaven, or hell.

== Controversies ==
=== Tax affairs ===
In August 2010, the Danish tax authorities (SKAT) investigated reports that Thorning-Schmidt's husband, Stephen Kinnock, was guilty of tax evasion. Kinnock had declared that he was not a resident of Denmark and thus not subject to Danish taxes, while at the same time Thorning-Schmidt had declared, in an application for dispensation for Kinnock to own property in Denmark, that he resided in Denmark "every weekend of the year from Friday through to Monday". Thorning-Schmidt attributed the discrepancy to a "big and sloppy error". On 16 September 2010, Danish tax authorities acquitted the couple and the charges of tax evasion were dropped.

A week before 15 September 2011 elections to the Danish Parliament, the 2010 decision from SKAT (the taxation department) surfaced in the Danish tabloid B.T. The case had been leaked to the newspaper several months previously. It turned out that from 2000 to 2008 Thorning-Schmidt had made use of tax deductions applicable to her husband, even though he was not subject to Danish taxes and had no income in Denmark. The mistake was corrected by SKAT for the three years from 2006 to 2008, and Thorning-Schmidt paid the amount she had saved due to the error. She was however not required to pay the amounts saved for the six years from 2000 to 2005, because of the statutory time limit for liability in such cases.

In November 2011, the daily Politiken disclosed that the Tax Ministry deputy chief Peter Loft had attended several meetings attending to the Thorning-Schmidt case and had tried to insert comments into the final resolution text. This would be unlawful under Danish law as the Tax Ministry may not interfere with the decisions taken in individual tax cases. This set off a flurry of speculation in the press, as to whether there had been any political pressure from the then government to pursue a stricter course in the tax case. The Tax Minister in the new government, Thor Möger Pedersen, subsequently asked Peter Loft and the director of the revenue service's Copenhagen branch, Erling Andersen, to give a report on the happenings. On 2 December, Pedersen disclosed that he had found such big discrepancies in the two reports that he would set up a commission of inquiry to determine the actual course of events.

Further controversy erupted when two days later the tabloid daily, Ekstra Bladet, reported that they had also been offered the confidential information that was made public during the election campaign. The source of the leak was determined to be Peter Arnfeldt, spin doctor for then Minister for Taxation Troels Lund Poulsen. This led to intense media speculation that the former government, and specifically Troels Lund Poulsen, were engaged in leaking confidential tax information and trying to pressure the revenue service into changing its decision in the case, in an active attempt to discredit the opposition leader in the then imminent election. This would constitute a hitherto unseen level of abuse of power in Danish political life. The commission of inquiry that had already been announced two days previously, was broadly supported by the Danish Parliament to also look into whether the former government was involved in, or knew of, the leak. On the same day, Troels Lund Poulsen announced he would be taking an indefinite leave of absence from the Danish Parliament. Peter Arnfeldt has been reported to the police by the Ministry for Taxation. In March 2012, Peter Loft was suspended from his post as deputy chief, for the duration of the two-year investigation period.

=== Selfie controversy ===
In December 2013, Thorning-Schmidt, British prime minister David Cameron and US president Barack Obama faced criticism on social media that they had behaved inappropriately after posing for a "selfie" taken with Thorning-Schmidt's mobile phone during the memorial service for the former South African President Nelson Mandela. Defending her actions, Thorning-Schmidt said, "There were lots of pictures taken that day, and I just thought it was a bit fun. Maybe it also shows that when we meet heads of state and government, we too are just people who have fun." Cameron said he was being polite when Thorning-Schmidt asked him to take part in the picture. On a previous occasion, Thorning-Schmidt had stopped her car to ask for a picture with the actress Sarah Jessica Parker after spotting her signing autographs in Oslo.

Party political offices
Preceded by Mogens Lykketoft	Leader of the Social Democrats; 2005–2015	Succeeded by Mette Frederiksen
Political offices
Preceded by Lars Løkke Rasmussen	Prime Minister of Denmark; 2011–2015	Succeeded by Lars Løkke Rasmussen
Academic offices
Preceded by Giorgio Napolitano	Invocation Speaker of the College of Europe; 2012	Succeeded by Íñigo Méndez de Vigo
