= Copenhagen Bus Terminal =

Bus terminal for long-distance buses in Copenhagen, Denmark

Copenhagen Bus Terminal København Bus Terminal
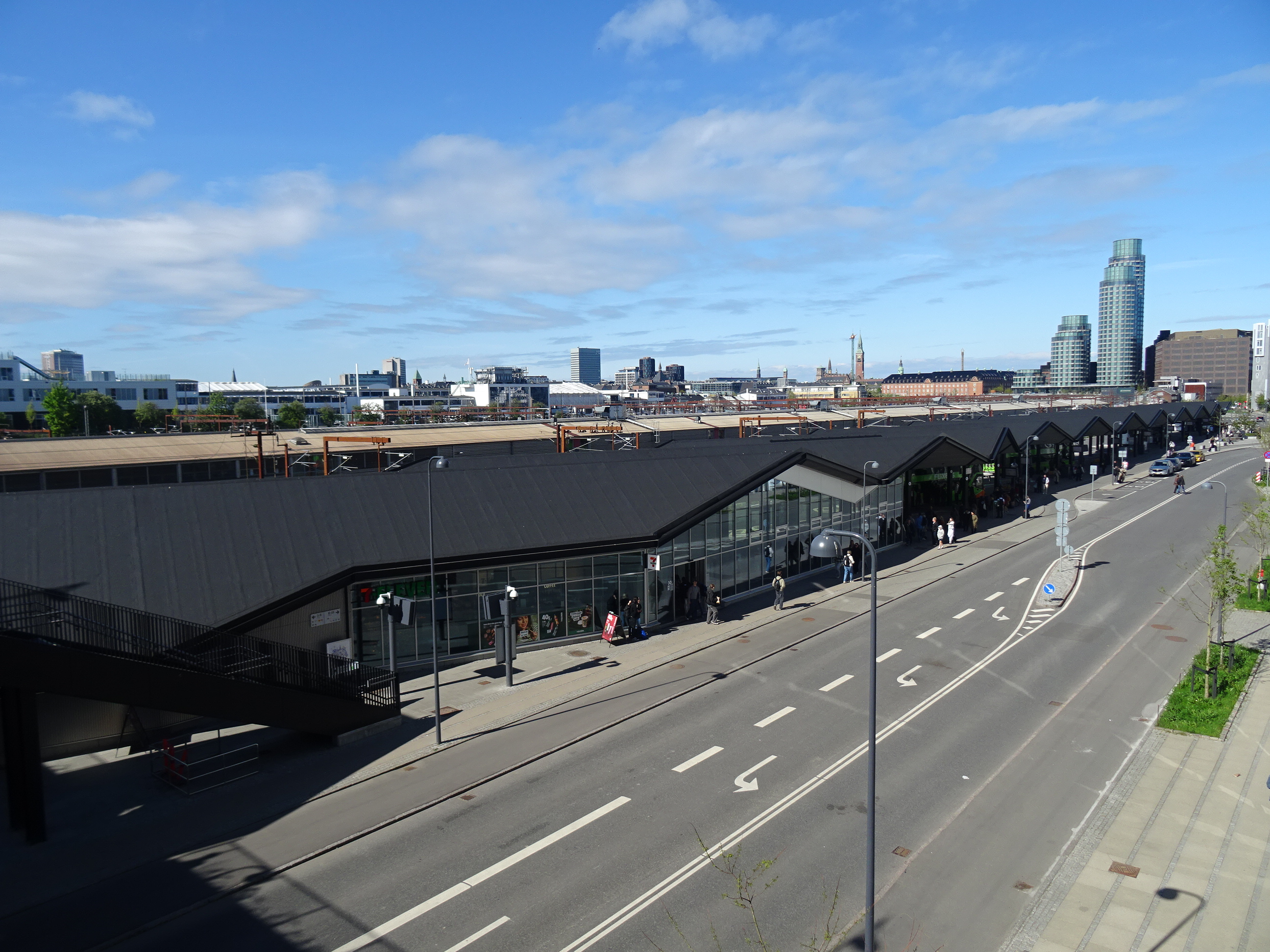

General information
- Location: Carsten Niebuhrs Gade 30, 1577 Copenhagen V Denmark
- Coordinates: 55.6649°N 12.5618°E
- System: Bus Terminus
- Platforms: 15
- Bus operators: Kombardo Expressen; Flixbus; Vy bus4you

Construction
- Parking: Yes
- Cycle facilities: Yes
- Accessible: yes

History
- Opened: 6 June 2024
Location

Copenhagen Bus Terminal is a bus terminus in Copenhagen, Denmark. Situated along the Dybbølsbro railway station, it became operational on 6 June 2024. It was built to alleviate the previous situation where long-distance buses would park alongside the Ingerslevsgade road leading up to Copenhagen Central Station. That arrangement meant the passengers from the buses often stood in the way of cyclists and pedestrians.

== History ==
In 2018 the Copenhagen Municipality and the Ministry of Transport decided that the Dybbølsbro neighbourhood of Copenhagen would be the area of choice for a future bus terminal. In 2020 the specific location was announced. It would be built alongside the main railway tracks going into Copenhagen Central Station, with Ikea and a hotel as the closest neighbours.

== Financials ==
The project was projected to cost 80 million DKK. The budget increased in May 2022 by an extra 30 million DKK.

== Infrastructure ==
The bus terminal features 15 platforms with a main building with a 7-Eleven, seating area and toilets. The terminal is built with an Intelligent transportation system where buses are registered via cameras when entering the terminal, which then assigns the bus a platform where the bus will arrive at and later depart from.

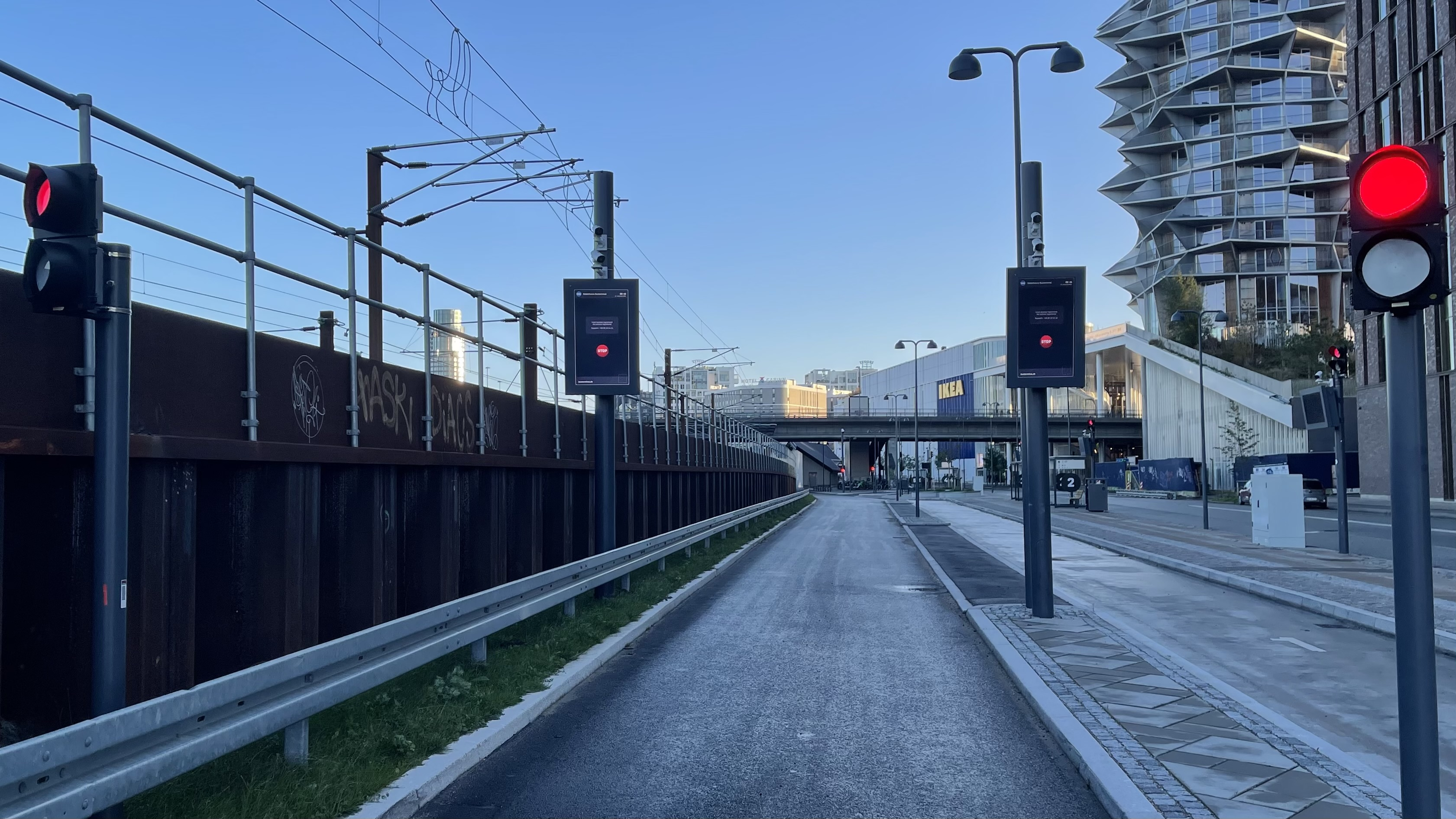
The automated system which assigns incoming buses a platform

== Connections ==
The bus terminal is directly connected to the same bridge that connects to Dybbølsbro station. The Havneholm metro station is within walking distance.

== See also ==
- Transport in Denmark
- Transport in Copenhagen
