= Ertuğrul Tekşen =

Turkish footballer (born 2000)

Personal information
- Date of birth: 25 April 2000 (age 26)
- Place of birth: Ishøj, Denmark
- Height: 1.85 m (6 ft 1 in)
- Position: Forward

Team information
- Current team: Ishøj IF
- Number: 15

Youth career
- SB 50 Ishøj
- Brøndby

Senior career*
Years	Team	Apps	(Gls)
2019–2021	Lyngby	7	(0)
2021	Konyaspor	0	(0)
2021	→ 1922 Konyaspor (loan)	11	(1)
2021–2022	Næstved	3	(0)
2022	Niğde Anadolu	12	(2)
2022–2023	Belediye Kütahyaspor	14	(2)
2023	Uşakspor	13	(2)
2023	Brabrand	7	(0)
2024	1922 Konyaspor	11	(5)
2024–2025	Ishøj IF	12	(0)
2025–2026	Holbæk B&I	40	(9)
2026–	Ishøj IF	9	(3)

International career
2015–2016	Turkey U16	5	(1)
- * Club domestic league appearances and goals as of 4 October 2026

Ertuğrul Tekşen (born 25 April 2000) is a professional footballer who plays as a forward for Danish 3rd Division club Ishøj IF. Born in Denmark, he has represented Turkey at youth level.

== Club career ==
=== Early years ===
Tekşen started playing football at an early age in Ishøj with local club SB 50. He soon moved to the Brøndby youth academy, where he initially struggled. At under-13 level, he was not among the best players and his development stagnated, which he later attributed to a poor relationship to his coaches. The following year new academy coaches were hired, and as an under-14 level player Tekşen began progressing, which made him stay at the club. In October 2016, as part of the under-17 team, he signed a two-year contract extension, which would keep him at the club until under-19 level.

=== Lyngby ===
During the summer of 2019, Tekşen moved to the under-19 team of Lyngby Boldklub, after two successive unsuccessful trials at Nykøbing FC and FC Roskilde. He made his first-team debut on 29 November 2019 in a Danish Superliga matchup against FC Nordsjælland, coming on as a 60th-minute substitute for Emilio Simonsen as the match ended 1–1. On 10 March 2020, Tekşen signed a one-year contract extension with Lyngby keeping him part of the club until at least 31 December 2020.

=== Konyaspor ===
On 9 January 2021, it was announced that Tekşen would sign a two-and-a-half-year contract with Turkish Süper Lig club Konyaspor. He was officially presented by the club on 13 January.

On 21 January, he was sent on loan to the feeder club 1922 Konyaspor on a one-and-a-half-year deal. He made his debut for the club on 27 January, coming on as a substitute in the 79th minute of a TFF Second League match against Sakaryaspor, which ended in a 1–1 draw. He scored his first goal for the club on 3 February in a 2–0 win over Karacabey Belediyespor, which was also his first senior goal.

He had his contract terminated by mutual consent in the summer of 2021.

=== Næstved ===
In September 2021, Tekşen returned to Denmark to sign for Næstved Boldklub competing in the third tier 2nd Division, after a successful trial. He made his debut on 3 October in a 2–1 win over FA 2000.

=== Niğde Anadolu ===
On 14 February 2022, Tekşen signed with TFF Second League club Niğde Anadolu. His debut for the club came on the same day, coming off the bench in the 76th minute in a 3–0 home loss to Adıyamanspor. On 17 April, he scored his first goal for Niğde Anadolu in a 2–0 victory against Sarıyer.

=== Belediye Kütahyaspor ===
Tekşen joined TFF Third League club Belediye Kütahyaspor on 31 July 2022, signing a two-year contract.

== International career ==
Tekşen has represented Turkey at under-16 level, gaining five caps in which he scored one goal.

== Career statistics ==
As of match played 7 May 2022

Club	Season	League			Cup		Continental		Total	
Club	Season	Division	Apps	Goals	Apps	Goals	Apps	Goals	Apps	Goals
Lyngby	2019–20	Superliga	5	0	0	0	—		5	0
Lyngby	2020–21	Superliga	2	0	1	0	—		3	0
Lyngby	Total		7	0	1	0	—		8	0
1922 Konyaspor	2020–21	TFF Second League	11	1	0	0	—		11	1
Næstved	2021–22	2nd Division	3	0	0	0	—		3	0
Niğde Anadolu	2021–22	TFF Second League	12	2	0	0	—		12	2
Belediye Kütahyaspor	2022–23	TFF Third League	0	0	0	0	—		0	0
Career total			33	3	1	0	0	0	34	3
