= Dybbølsbro railway station =

Commuter railway station in Copenhagen, Denmark

Dybbølsbro
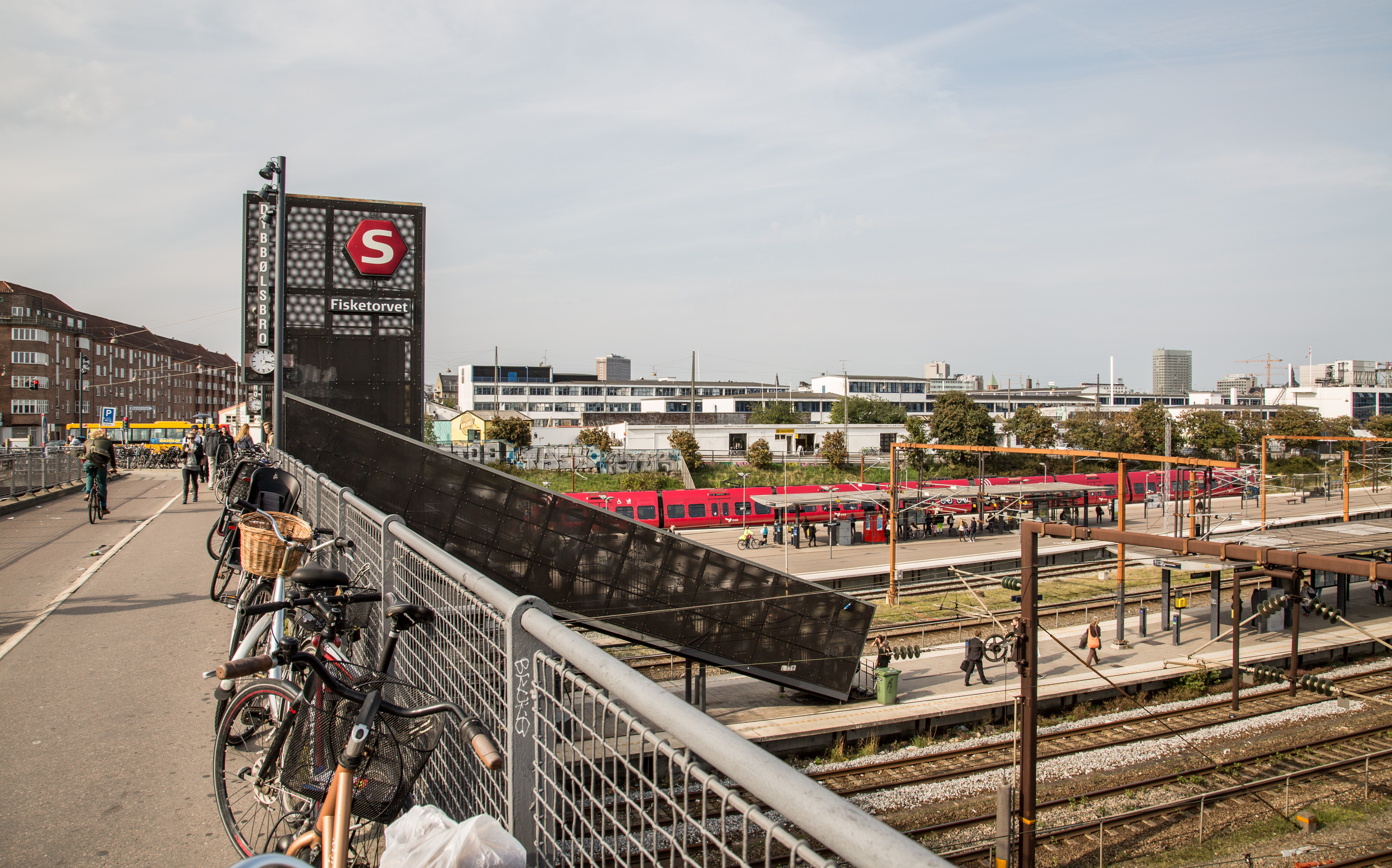
- Dybbølsbro station in 2014

General information
- Location: Ingerslevsgade 101; 1705 Copenhagen V Copenhagen Municipality; Denmark
- Coordinates: 55°39′55″N 12°33′34″E
- Elevation: 2.6 metres (8 ft 6 in)
- Owner: DSB (station infrastructure); Banedanmark (rail infrastructure)
- Platforms: 2 island platforms
- Tracks: 4 in service
- Train operators: DSB

Other information
- Station code: Dbt
- Website: Official website

History
- Opened: 1 November 1934; 91 years ago

Services
Preceding station	S-train	Following station
København H towards Hillerød	A	Sydhavn towards Hundige
København H towards Hillerød	A Sat–Sun	Sydhavn towards Køge
København H towards Farum	B	Carlsberg towards Høje Taastrup
København H towards Buddinge	Bx Peak hours	Carlsberg towards Høje Taastrup
København H towards Klampenborg	C	Carlsberg towards Frederikssund
København H towards Holte	E Mon–Fri	Sydhavn towards Køge
København H towards Østerport	H Mon–Fri	Carlsberg towards Ballerup
Location

Dybbølsbro station is a central S-train railway station serving the district of Vesterbro in Copenhagen, Denmark.

== History ==
The station opened on 1 November 1934 when S-train service was extended from København H to Valby. A fourth platform was inaugurated in 2009.

== Platforms ==
The four platforms are located under Dybbølsbro, a viaduct connecting Kalvebod Brygge and Havneholmen with the rest of Vesterbro across the railway tracks. They are accessed from the bridge with stairs or lifts.

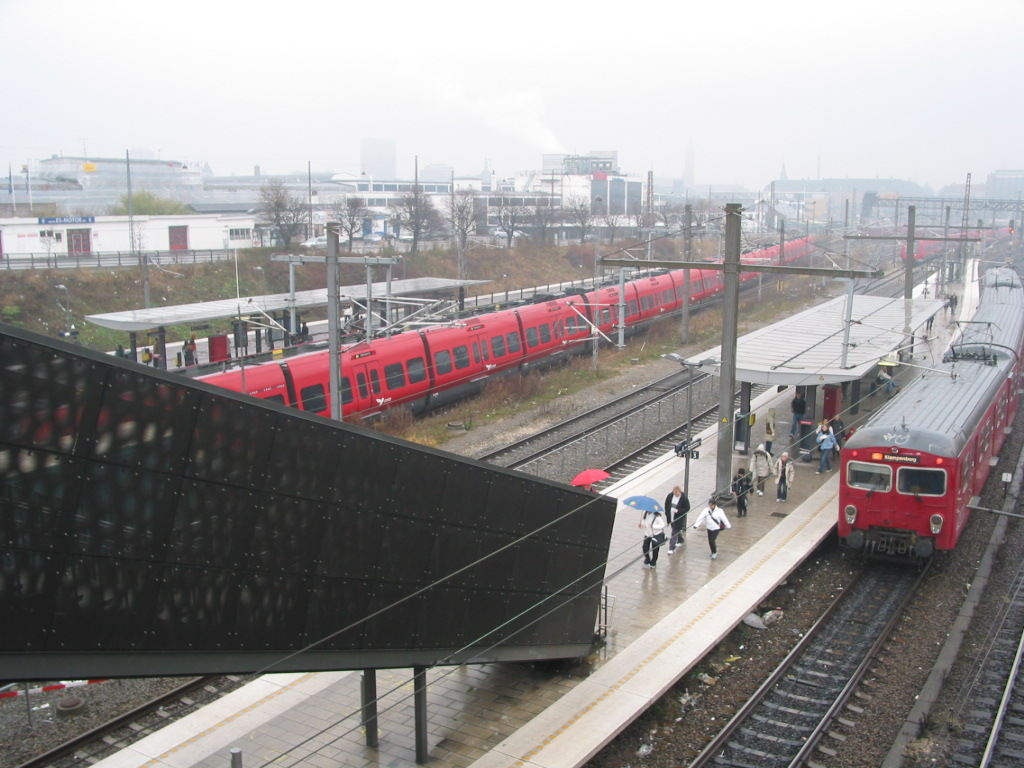
View from the pedestrian and bicycle bridge over the station and across the tracks

== Bus terminal ==
Before 2024 there was no proper bus station for scheduled long-distance buses in Copenhagen. They stopped on Ingerslevsgade, a street between Dybbølsbro and Copenhagen Central Station. In 2020 the city decided to build a bus station near Dybbølsbro station. Copenhagen Bus Terminal opened on 6 June 2024.

== See also ==
- List of Copenhagen S-train stations
- List of railway stations in Denmark
