= Nadia Alawa =

Founder of NuDay and empowerment advocate

Nadia Alawa is the founder and former CEO of the non-profit NuDay. The NGO provides humanitarian relief to people affected by the crisis in Syria through its use of public donations, which directly fund projects such as building wells and educational facilities. Alawa's work in the humanitarian aid space has earned accolades and recognition from institutions like the United Nations, Harvard University, and the James Wright Foley Legacy Foundation.

== Early life ==
Nadia Alawa started local fundraising soon after the Syrian Revolution broke out. As she successfully collected several containers of clothing, food and supplies for aid agencies, she realized she would be more efficient if she had her own organization.

== NuDay ==
During her years of advocacy and humanitarian relief work, Alawa was exposed to the conditions of Syria's mothers and children as a result of the Syrian crisis. As a response, Alawa founded NuDay in 2013. The charity is a non profit organization that provides humanitarian relief to people affected by the crisis in Syria through its use of public donations, which directly fund projects such as building wells and educational facilities.

Due to Syria's ongoing crisis, children are vulnerable, and an entire generation has become accustomed to a life filled with uncertainty and without access to education. Women, in the hopes of supporting their family, may resort to desperate actions, which NuDay seeks to stop.

In an interview with NHPR, Alawa stated that, when it came to the impact people have had on the humanitarian crisis, "We have huge numbers of people who want to collect new items, who want to participate in doing the containers, and likewise with donations. We’re seeing new groups of people all over the United States and especially here in New England who want to be part of helping those mothers and children in being—making their own statement that they understand that humanity is at stake here and not letting terrorism be their voice."
