= Vocational secondary education in Denmark =

Vocational secondary education in Denmark (Danish: erhvervsuddannelse) takes place at special state-funded vocational schools (erhvervsskoler), most of which are either technical schools (tekniske skoler) or business colleges (handelsskoler). The creation of vocational training began as early as the 1400s, but wasn't fully established until 1875 when Denmark passed legislation that would allow for the use of government grants towards technical and training schools. Vocational training schools are jointly run by business and trade associations, such as unions who hope to create a form of stream-lined training into the labour force. Through a combination of teaching in vocational schools and apprenticeship, mostly in private companies, students are trained for work in eight specific fields which include: construction, commerce, metal, agriculture, transportation, food, service, and media.

This form of education is very popular among students in the upper secondary division of school where over 50% join vocational training. The vocational secondary education in Denmark includes the addition of work-place based training. Many students utilize this time in vocational training to expand their skills and create a stronger program of focus for their field. The implementation of a workplace training is mandatory for at least 3 months. A large proportion of Denmark's labor force comes from these vocational programs. The vocational study force has a long relationship with the industries students would enter after graduation, quickly and smoothly entering the labor force. The long term unemployment (12 months or more) is 19%, well below the average of other OECD countries.

Vocational education takes 2–5 years and can be commenced after the completion of the compulsory primary folkeskole ('public school'), i.e. at age 15-16.*

Contrary to academically oriented types of secondary education such as the Gymnasium, vocational secondary education aims directly at jobs rather than higher education, although it is possible, with certain requirements, to enter a university to study for instance engineering upon completing vocational education.

Students train for work in a specific profession (e.g. as an electrician or a chef), but the different education programmes are organized in eight main groups that share certain subjects:

- Building
- Crafts and technique
- From earth to table (hotel, cooking, foods, agriculture)
- Mechanics, transport and logistics
- Commercial area (trade, office, finance)
- Service
- Technology and communication
- Vocational elementary course

In addition, it is also possible to pursue vocational secondary education aimed at work in social and health institutions such as nursing homes: Basic Social and Health Education (Social- og Sundhedsuddannelse or SoSu).

Furthermore, there are programmes combining vocational elements with more academically oriented elements: Higher Technical Examination Programme (HTX) and Higher Commercial Examination Programme. These aim at higher education and are comparable to the more general and theoretical Gymnasium and Higher Preparatory Examination (HF).

As of 2023, the most common type of education completed in Denmark was vocational education and training programs. According to researcher Einar Dyvik, close to 28 percent of the population between 15 and 69 years of age had completed this education.
