= Listed buildings in Ishøj Municipality =

This is a list of listed buildings in Ishøj Municipality, Denmark.

== The list ==
Listing name	Image	Location	Coordinates	Description
Barfredshøj		Thorsbrovej 22, 2640 Hedehusene	55°37′17.51″N 12°13′21.32″E	House from 1834
Thorsbro Waterworks		Allevej 27, 2635 Ishøj	55°37′20.03″N 12°16′17.64″E	Engine house
Thorsbro Waterworks		Allevej 27, 2635 Ishøj	55°37′20.03″N 12°16′17.64″E	Hanekammerbygningen (The cockpit building)
Thorsbro Waterworks		Allevej 27, 2635 Ishøj	55°37′20.03″N 12°16′17.64″E	Samlebrøndsbygningen (Thorsbro Vandværk Museum)
