= Ingerslevsgade =

Street in Copenhagen Municipality, Denmark

Coordinates: 55.669961°N 12.565566°E

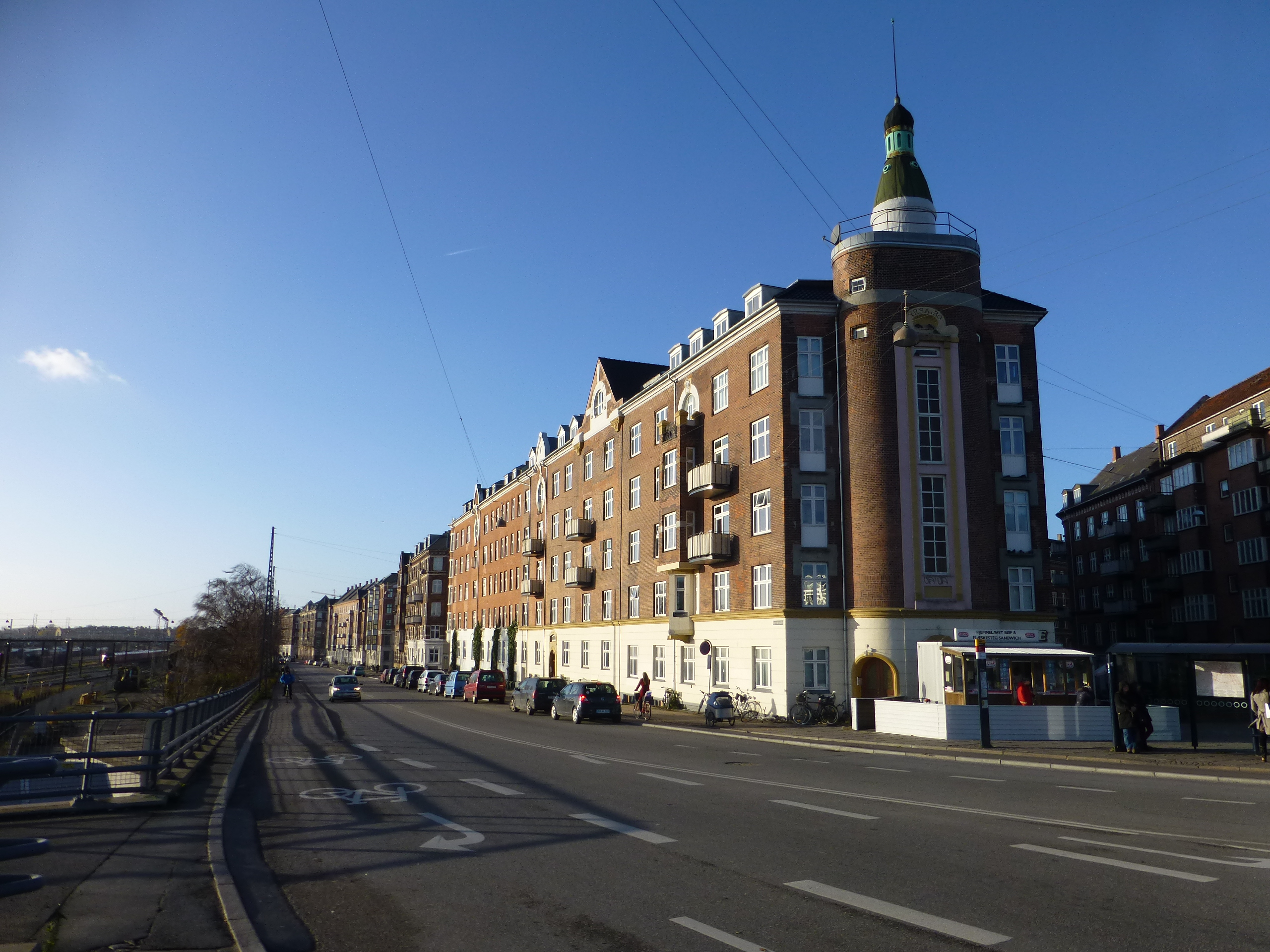
Ingerslevsgade as viewed from Dybbøl Bridge

Ingerslevsgade is a street in the Vesterbro district of Copenhagen, Denmark. It begins on the rear side of Copenhagen Central Station and follows the northwest side of the railway tracks to Enghave station. It also passes the Dybbølsbro station where Dybbøl Bridge connects it to Kalvebod Brygge and Havneholmen, Copenhagen on the other side of the railway tracks. The street is named after the politician Hans Peter Ingerslev, who was involved in the construction of the Free Port of Copenhagen.

== Notable buildings ==
The first part of the street, from the Central Station to Dybbøl Bridge, passes the DGI-byen sports and conference centre and the White Meat District. The rest of the street is lined by apartment blocks from about 1900.

== Long-distance buses ==
Until the opening of Copenhagen Bus Terminal on 6 June 2024, most national and international buses that ran through Copenhagen had their main stop in Copenhagen at Ingerslevsgade, adjacent to the DGI-byen complex near Copenhagen Central Station. These included buses for Nettbuss express, Swebus Express and Eurolines. The street had no proper facilities for a bus station, just a few simple rain and wind shelters. Passengers boarded the buses from the bicycle path.

The bus area was located near track 12 of the Central Station (west side), just south of the Tietgensgade bridge which goes over the tracks.
