= NuDay =

US-based non-profit organization

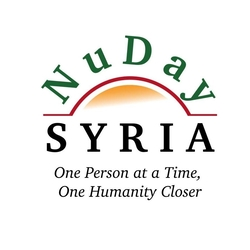
- Founded: 2013; 13 years ago
- Founder: Nadia Alawa
- Type: International NGO
- Location: New Hampshire, U.S.
- Region served: Syria, Turkey
- Fields: Humanitarian aid and activism; Sustainable aid; Mothers and children affected by the Syrian crisis
- Website: www.nudaysyria.org

NuDay is a non-profit organization that provides humanitarian relief to people affected by the crisis in Syria. Founded in 2013, NuDay is headquartered in New Hampshire. Since the start of the Syrian Revolution, NuDay has shipped millions of dollars' worth of clothes, medicine, and food to displaced families in Syria. It also provides help for the housing, work and schooling of Syrian refugees in Turkey. In 2017, NuDay undertook 480 projects inside Syria and within Turkey's Syrian refugee camps, benefiting over 881,400 people.

In recent years, NuDay has re-asserted its focus on protection and livelihood, which guarantee long-term impact and empowerment. Education and psychosocial support are key to NuDay's work.

== History ==
Founder Nadia Alawa is a female empowerment advocate and fundraised locally for humanitarian causes before founding the organization in 2013. She started local fundraising soon after the Syrian Revolution broke out. As she successfully collected several containers of clothing, food and supplies for aid agencies, she realized she would be more efficient if she had her own organization.

In February 2013, NuDay was founded as a 501(c)(3) organization. By mid-2013, thousands of people had been involved from across New England.

By May 2015, NuDay had sent 53 shipping containers with medical supplies, clothing, food, and toys to conflict zones in northern Syria. Alawa raised $1 million for other kinds of help: smuggling goats into a besieged area near Damascus to produce milk for babies; finding housing and work for Syrian refugee widows in Turkey and opening a school for refugee children there.

When other relief organizations would not distribute sleeping bags designed by MIT students, NuDay undertook their distribution in Syria. NuDay also launched a fundraising campaign to cover medical bills and provide prosthetic arms for Ahmad Alkhalaf, a boy who drew attention to Syrian refugees by writing a letter to the president at the time, Barack Obama. Alkhalaf and Alawa attended the State of Union in 2016, on the invitation of Representative Seth Moulton.

== Operations ==
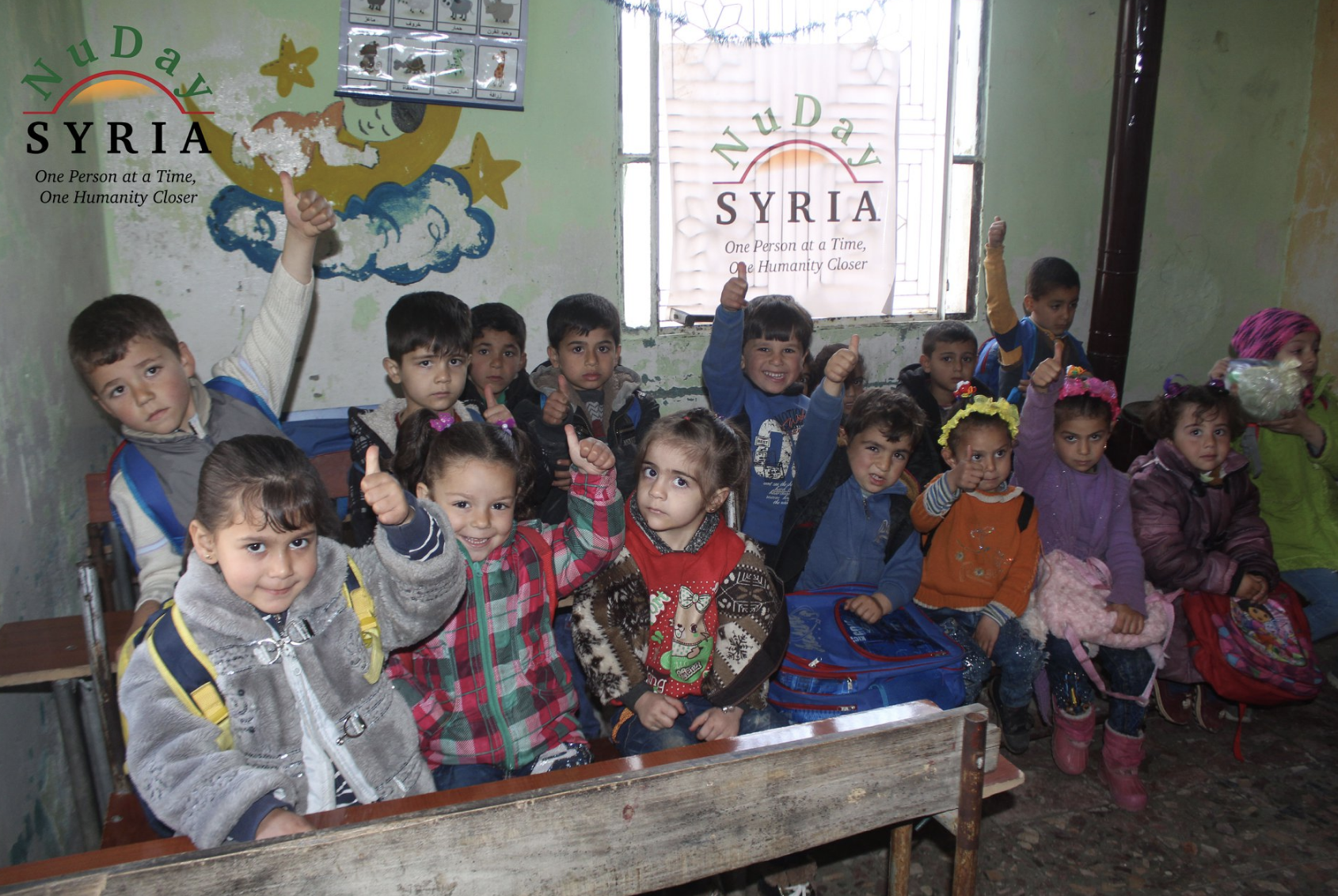
Syrian children attend a NuDay-operated school.

NuDay is a registered international relief organization that provides both immediate humanitarian assistance and long-term, socio-economic and educational programming for Syrian women and children. Through this work, NuDay aims to build bridges from families in the US to families inside Syria.

For almost a decade, Syria has been in an unstable situation. As a result, children are vulnerable, and an entire generation has become accustomed to a life filled with uncertainty and without access to education. Women, in the hopes of supporting their family, may resort to desperate actions, which NuDay seeks to stop.

NuDay focuses on bringing housing and food to displaced families with single mothers or wounded family members in Syria. The organization's board is made up almost entirely of women.

Its aid consists of in-kind donations and funding programs. NuDay volunteers collect donations in mosques, churches, and clinics across New England. Almost the entire operation is run on Facebook and WhatsApp. They send containers with aid to Turkey, where a NuDay employee drives them to the Syrian border. Syrian partners include expatriates, local survivors of regime persecution, and Arab Spring activists. They distribute the aid in non-government-controlled areas of northern Syria, but not in regions controlled by Bashar al-Assad or ISIL.

== Legal issues ==
In September 2023, NuDay Syria pleaded guilty to three counts of Failure to File Export Information. From 2018 to 2021, NuDay made over 100 shipments to Syria despite sanctions and export restrictions. NuDay falsely reported that the shipments were destined for Turkey and undervalued the goods by several million dollars to avoid reporting requirements.

In December 2023, NuDay was sentenced to five years of probation, the maximum penalty for an organizational defendant, and ordered to pay a $25,000 fine.

== Ratings ==
GuideStar gave the organization a "Platinum Seal of Transparency." As of May 2018, Charity Navigator rates the organization among their highest-rated charities, having the highest level of engagement and effectiveness with funding, donors, and projects.
