= Higher education in Denmark =

Higher education in Denmark is offered by a range of universities, university colleges, business academies and specialised institutions. The national higher education system is in accordance with the Bologna Process, with bachelor's degrees (first cycle, three years), master's degrees (second cycle, two years) and doctoral degrees (third cycle, three years). The majority of higher education institutions are the responsibility of the Ministry of Higher Education and Science; however, some higher education institutions within the arts are the responsibility of the Ministry of Culture.

== System ==
=== Admission ===
The general entry requirement for acceptance to higher education is a Danish upper secondary school leaving certificate or equivalent. Individual programmes also have specific entry requirements, such as mathematics at a specific level, and language requirements in Danish or English or both. Admission at first cycle programmes in Denmark is coordinated centrally by the Ministry of Higher Education and Science. Admission to master's programmes and doctoral programmes is done at each individual university.

=== Structure and grading ===
Higher education in Denmark is structured according to the ECTS. A normal study progression awards 60 ECTS-points per year (30 per semester), most institutions use a block system of either 5, 7.5 or 10 ECTS-points. Academic grading in Denmark is done according to the 7-point grading scale (Danish: 7-trins-skalaen), equalling the seven grades in the ECTS grading scale.

== Institutions ==
Institutions of higher education in Denmark are divided into five categories: business academies, university colleges, institutions in architecture and art, maritime educational institutions and universities.

=== Universities ===
There are eight state-recognized and funded universities in Denmark, offering research-based education and awarding bachelor's, master's, and doctoral degrees. Below the list of these universities in chronological order of established:

- University of Copenhagen: (1479–), headquartered in Copenhagen, but also has facilities in Frederiksberg, Taastrup, Helsingør, Hørsholm, and Nødebo
- Technical University of Denmark (DTU): (1829–), located in Kongens Lyngby
- Copenhagen Business School: (1917–), located in Frederiksberg
- Aarhus University: (1928–), headquartered in Aarhus, but also has facilities in Copenhagen, Roskilde, Silkeborg, Foulum and Herning
- Roskilde University: (1972–), located in Roskilde
- Aalborg University: (1974–), headquartered in Aalborg, but also has facilities in Copenhagen and Esbjerg
- University of Southern Denmark: (1998–), headquartered in Odense, but also has facilities in Kolding, Sønderborg, Esbjerg, Slagelse and Copenhagen
- IT University of Copenhagen: (1999–), located in Copenhagen

=== Institutions in architecture and art ===
There are nine higher education institutions in Denmark teaching architecture and arts, two organized under the Ministry of Higher Education and Science, six under the Ministry of Culture, and one jointly between the two ministries.

==== Ministry of Higher Education and Science ====
- Royal Danish Academy of Fine Arts, Copenhagen (1754–) (studies in architecture, design and conservation)
- Aarhus School of Architecture, Aarhus (1965–)
- Design School Kolding, Kolding (1967–)

==== Ministry of Culture ====
- Royal Danish Academy of Fine Arts, Copenhagen (1754–) (Visual arts)
- Royal Danish Academy of Music, Frederiksberg (1825–)
- Royal Academy of Music, Aarhus and Aalborg (1927–)
- The National Film School of Denmark, Copenhagen (1966–)
- Rhythmic Music Conservatory, Copenhagen (1986–)
- Danish National Academy of Music, Odense and Esbjerg (2015–)
- The Danish National School of Performing Arts, Copenhagen (2015–)

=== University colleges ===
There are eight university colleges in Denmark (Danish: professionshøjskole) awarding professional bachelor's degrees:

- KEA - Copenhagen School of Design and Technology, Copenhagen (2009–)
- Danish School of Media and Journalism, Aarhus (1971–)
- University College Absalon, Sorø (2007–)
- Metropolitan University College, Copenhagen (2008–)
- University College Copenhagen, Copenhagen (2008–)
- University College Lillebaelt, Vejle (2008–)
- University College of Northern Denmark, Aalborg (2008–)
- VIA University College, Aarhus (2008–)
- University College South Denmark, Esbjerg (2011–)
- The Necessary Teacher Training College, Ulfborg (1972–)

=== Business academies ===
There are nine business academies (Danish: erhvervsakademi) in Denmark offering two-year academy profession programmes and, to a lesser extent, professional bachelor's degrees:

- IBA International Business Academy, Kolding (1991–)
- Business Academy Aarhus, Aarhus (2009–)
- Business Academy of higher education MidWest, Herning and Holstebro (2009–)
- Copenhagen Business Academy, Copenhagen (2009–)
- Danish Academy of Business and Technology (Dania Academy), Randers (2009–)
- EA Business Academy SouthWest, Esbjerg and Sønderborg (2009–)
- Lillebaelt Academy, Odense and Vejle (2009–)
- Zealand Institute of Business and Technology, Køge (2009–)

=== Maritime educational institutions ===
There are three maritime educational institutions in Denmark:

- Copenhagen School of Marine Engineering and Technology Management, Copenhagen (1906–)
- Aarhus School of Marine and Technical Engineering, Aarhus
- Fredericia Maskinmesterskole, Fredericia

=== Former universities and colleges ===
The following is a list of former universities and colleges in Denmark:

- Royal Veterinary and Agricultural University, Frederiksberg (1856–2007) (Note: In 2007, the Royal Veterinary and Agricultural University was merged into the University of Copenhagen.)
- Pharmaceutical College, Copenhagen (1892–1942) (Note: The Pharmaceutical College was founded in 1892 by the chemist Christian D.A. Hansen. The school was originally located on Stockholmsgade but outgrew its premises in the late 1930s. In 1942, the Pharmaceutical College moved into a new building at University Park and changed its name to the Danish Pharmaceutical College.)
- Aarhus School of Business, Aarhus (1939–2007) (Note: In 2007, Aarhus School of Business was merged into Aarhus University.)
- Danish Pharmaceutical College, Copenhagen (1942–2003) (Note: In 2003, the Danish Pharmaceutical College was renamed as the Danish University of Pharmaceutical Science.)
- Royal School of Library and Information Science, Copenhagen and Aalborg (1956–2013) (Note: In 2013, the Royal School of Library and Information Science was merged into the University of Copenhagen.)
- Odense University, Odense (1966–1998) (Note: In 1998, Odense University was merged with the Southern Denmark School of Business and Engineering and the South Jutland University Centre to form the University of Southern Denmark.)
- Danish University of Pharmaceutical Science, Copenhagen (2003–2007) (Note: In 2007, the Danish University of Pharmaceutical Science was merged into the University of Copenhagen.)
- University College South; it had facilities in Kolding, Haderslev, Aabenraa, and Sønderborg (2008–2011) (Note: In 2011, University College South merged with West Jutland University College to form University College South Denmark.)
- West Jutland University College, Esbjerg (2008–2011) (Note: In 2011, West Jutland University College merged with University College South to form University College South Denmark.)

== Student welfare and economics ==
There are no tuition fees for attending public higher education in Denmark, as all costs are covered by the Danish state. Citizens of EU and EEA countries have equal rights and do not pay tuition fee to study at public institutions of higher education in Denmark.

Students are also given the opportunity to apply for financial support from the State Educational Grant and Loan Scheme, normally referred to as "SU" (Statens Uddannelsesstøtte). Foreign citizens may apply for equal status with Danish citizens and thus be approved to receive SU.

== International rankings ==
Below are shown the international rankings of the government supported research universities of Denmark, and the number of times they rank in the top 200 of one of the six prominent global rankings:

University	QS World (2026)	THE World (2026)	ARWU World (2025)	USNWR World (2025–26)	CWTS Leiden (2025)	CWUR World (2025)	#^{a}
University of Copenhagen	101	90	35	41=	40	38	6^{b}
Aarhus University	131	101	85	117	148	100	6^{b}
Technical University of Denmark	107	121	151–200	178=	264	206	4
University of Southern Denmark	303=	251-300	301–400	255	344	289	0
Aalborg University	306=	251-300	301–400	276=	391	332	0
Copenhagen Business School	—N/a	301-350^{c}	701–800	601=	—N/a	1056	0
Roskilde University	—N/a	401–500	—N/a	1304=	—N/a	1748	0
IT University of Copenhagen	—N/a	—N/a	—N/a	—N/a	—N/a	—N/a	0

Notes:
A dash (–) indicates not applicable (N/A)
^{a} Number of times the university is ranked within the top 200 of one of the six global rankings.
^{b} The university is ranked within the top 150 of all six global rankings.
^{c} THE World University Rankings 2024 (rankings thereafter are not available).

== See also ==
- Lists of universities and colleges
- List of schools in Denmark
- List of educational institutions in Denmark
- Open access in Denmark
- University of Greenland
