= List of university colleges =

A university college is a college institution that provides tertiary education but does not have full or independent university status.

== Australia ==
- University College (University of Melbourne)

== Canada ==
=== Alberta ===
- Canadian University College, Lacombe; former name of Burman University
- Concordia University College of Alberta, Edmonton; former name of Concordia University of Edmonton
- King's University College (Edmonton); former name of The King's University

=== British Columbia ===
- Kwantlen University College, Greater Vancouver; former name of Kwantlen Polytechnic University
- Malsapina University College, Nanaimo; former name of Vancouver Island University
- University College of the Cariboo, Kamloops, British Columbia; merged with British Columbia Open University to become Thompson Rivers University
- University College of the Fraser Valley, Fraser Valley

=== Manitoba ===
- University College of the North, The Pas
- Booth University College, Winnipeg

=== Ontario ===
- University College, University of Toronto
- University of Waterloo, affiliate colleges:
  - Conrad Grebel University College
  - Renison University College
  - St. Paul's University College
- University of Western Ontario, affiliated colleges:
  - Brescia University College
  - Huron University College
  - King's University College (University of Western Ontario)
- University College (University of Western Ontario), a building on the campus of the University of Western Ontario
- Algoma University College, Sault Ste. Marie; former name of Laurentian University

== Denmark ==
- Metropolitan University College, Copenhagen; formerly CVU Øresund, The Danish Teacher Training, National Management College, the Social School, Frederiksberg Seminarium and Suhr's Seminarium
- University College Capital, formerly Greater Copenhagen CVU and CVU Copenhagen & North Zealand
- UCL University College, formerly CVU Fyn, CVU Jelling, CVSU Fyn and the Social College of Odense
- University College of Northern Denmark
- University College Sealand, formerly South CDE and CDE Zealand
- University College South, formerly CDE Sønderjylland
- VIA University College, central Denmark; formerly CVU'erne (Center for Higher Education)
- West Jutland University College, Esbjerg; formerly CVU Vest

== Germany ==
- University College Freiburg, founded by University of Freiburg

== India ==
- Pachhunga University College, Aizawl
- University College, Trivandrum, Thiruvananthapuram, Kerala
- University College of Medical Sciences, New Delhi

== Ireland ==
- National University of Ireland, Galway, formerly University College, Galway
- University College Cork, formerly University College, Cork
- University College Dublin, formerly University College, Dublin

== Netherlands ==
- Amsterdam University College, founded by University of Amsterdam and the VU University Amsterdam
- Erasmus University College, the undergraduate college of Erasmus University Rotterdam
- Leiden University College The Hague, part of Leiden University
- University College Groningen, a faculty of University of Groningen
- University College Maastricht, part of Maastricht University
- Utrecht University, honors colleges:
  - University College Roosevelt, Middelburg, Zeeland
  - University College Utrecht

== New Zealand ==
- University College, Otago, Dunedin

== Nigeria ==
- University of Ibadan, formerly University College, Ibadan

== Norway ==
- Arctic University of Norway, formed from the merger of:
  - Finnmark University College
  - Harstad University College
  - Narvik University College
  - Tromsø University College
- Bergen University College, one of the colleges that joined to become Western Norway University of Applied Sciences
- Lillehammer University College, part of Inland Norway University of Applied Sciences
- Molde University College
- Nord University, formed from the merger of:
  - Bodø University College
  - Nesna University College
  - Nord-Trøndelag University College
- Norwegian University of Science and Technology (NTNU), formed from the merger of:
  - Aalesund University College
  - Gjøvik University College
  - Sør-Trøndelag University College
- Oslo and Akershus University College, former name of Oslo Metropolitan University
- Østfold University College
- Sogn og Fjordane University College
- Stavanger University College
- Stord/Haugesund University College
- University College of Southeast Norway, formed from the merger of:
  - Buskerud and Vestfold University College
  - Telemark University College
- Volda University College (Høgskolen i Volda)

== Pakistan ==
- Government College University, Lahore
- Islamia College University

== United Kingdom ==
=== Colleges of universities ===
- University College, Durham, the founding college of the University of Durham
- University College, Oxford, the oldest college of the University of Oxford, established in 1249
- University College London, a founding college of the University of London
  - University College Hospital, a hospital in London, founded as part of University College London
  - University College School, a private school in Hampstead, founded as part of University College London
- Wolfson College, Cambridge, a college of the University of Cambridge, formerly called University College, Cambridge

=== Former university colleges ===
- Arts University Bournemouth, formerly The Arts University College at Bournemouth
- Buckinghamshire New University, High Wycombe; formerly Buckinghamshire Chilterns University College
- Falmouth University, formerly University College Falmouth
- Harper Adams University, Edgmond; formerly Harper Adams University College
- Newman University, Birmingham; formerly Newman University College
- Norwich University of the Arts, formerly Norwich University College of the Arts
- Royal Agricultural University, Cirencester; formerly Royal Agricultural College
- St Mary's University, Twickenham; formerly St Mary's University College
- University College Birmingham, formerly Birmingham College of Food, Tourism and Creative Studies until January 2008
- University College, Bristol, predecessor institute of the University of Bristol
- University for the Creative Arts, formerly University College for the Creative Arts at Canterbury, Epsom, Farnham, Maidstone and Rochester
- University of St Mark & St John (commonly known as Marjon), Plymouth; formerly University College Plymouth St Mark & St John

=== University colleges ===
- Ifs University College, the London Institute of Banking & Finance
- St Mary's University College, Belfast
- Stranmillis University College, Belfast
- University College of Estate Management, Reading

== United States ==
- University College, an undergraduate college of Arizona State University
- University College, an undergraduate college of Sacred Heart University, Connecticut
- University College, an undergraduate college of the University of Northern Colorado
- University College of the University of Denver, online and evening programs for working adults, Colorado
- Kennesaw State University University College, an undergraduate college of Kennesaw State University, Georgia
- University of Maryland University College, focusing on "non-traditional" students
- University College, the adult evening and professional studies division of Washington University in St. Louis, Missouri
- Rutgers University College, New Jersey
- University College, an undergraduate college of the University of Toledo, Ohio
- University College, an undergraduate college of the University of Oklahoma
- University College, a college of Texas Tech University
- University College, an undergraduate college of the University of Rhode Island
- University College, an undergraduate college of Washington State University

== See also ==
- College (disambiguation)
- University (disambiguation)
- University college (Scandinavia), institutions that grant degrees on limited extents
