= List of educational institutions in Denmark =

In Denmark there are a wide range of higher educational institutions which offers a wide range of higher education at different educational levels such as short-length (1–2 years) educations, medium-length (3–4 years) educations and long-length educations (5–6 years).

== List of educational institutions in Denmark ==
Name of the educational institution	Motto	Motto in English	Established	Type	Endowment	Rector	Admin. staff	Students	Campus	Affiliations	Website
University of Copenhagen, (Danish: Københavns Universitet)	Coelestem adspicit lucem (Latin)	It looks at the celestial light	1479	Public University	DKK 6,467,000,000 ($1.25 Billion) (2008)	Ralf Hemmingsen	~ 7,000; ~ 5,500 full-time equivalents	37,986 (1 October 2007)	Central (city), North, South (formerly Amager) and West (Frederiksberg)	IARU, EUA	https://web.archive.org/web/20131015181815/http://www.ku.dk/
Aarhus University, (Danish: Aarhus Universitet)	Solidum petit in profundis (Latin)	Seek a firm footing in the depths	1928	Public university	DKK 5,270,000,000 ($1.03B USD) (2009)	Lauritz Broder Holm-Nielsen	11,000	32,000 (October 1, 2010)	Aarhus	EUA	https://www.au.dk
VIA University College, (Danish: VIA University College)	Unknown	Unknown	2008	University College, (Danish: professionshøjskoler)	1.2 billion DKK.	Harald Mikkelsen	2,000	20,000	Aarhus, Horsens, Gedved, Skanderborg, Ikast, Herning, Silkeborg, Holstebro, Grenå, Randers, Viborg, Skive, Nørr Nissum, Thisted	None	https://www.viauc.com
University of Southern Denmark, (Danish: Syddansk Universitet)	None. The former motto of Odense University was Fructus Increscit Opera Novo In Agro	None	1966/1998	Public	Unknown	Jens Oddershede	2,200	19,035	Odense, Esbjerg, Kolding, Sønderborg, Slagelse, Copenhagen	EUA	http://www.sdu.dk
Copenhagen Business School, (Danish: Handelshøjskolen i København)	Where University Means Business	None	1917	Public University	Funding (million euro) 151.7	Johan Roos	academic staff 566: full-time 720: part-time administrative staff 1,065	17,000 (1,903 foreign students)	Copenhagen	EQUIS, CEMS, AMBA	https://www.cbs.dk
University College of Northern Denmark, (Danish: Professionshøjskolen University College Nordjylland)	Unknown	Unknown	2008	University College, (Danish: professionshøjskoler)	Unknown	Niels Horsted	750	15,500 - (7000 full-time students, 8000 part-time students, 500 international full-time students)	Aalborg, Hjørring, Thisted	None	https://www.ucn.dk/
Aalborg University(AAU), (Danish: Aalborg Universitet (AAU)	Viis Novis	None	1974	Public university	Unknown	Finn Kjærsdam	1,639 (2006)	14,185 (2006)	Aalborg, Esbjerg, Copenhagen	EUA, ECIU, ENTREE	https://en.aau.dk
Roskilde University, (Danish: Roskilde Universitet)	In tranquillo mors - in fluctu vita	In silence, death; in movement, life	1972	Public university	Unknown	Unknown	893 (554 teaching staff) (2007)	8211 including part-time students (2007)	Roskilde	EUA	https://www.ruc.dk
Metropolitan University College, (Danish: Professionshøjskolen Metropol)	Unknown	Unknown	2008	University College, (Danish: professionshøjskoler)	650 million. DKK.	Stefan Hermann	Unknown	8000	Copenhagen, Frederiksberg, Herlev, Nørrebro, Aarhus, Rønne	None	http://www.phmetropol.dk
University College Lillebaelt, (Danish: University College Lillebælt)	Unknown	Unknown	2008	University College, (Danish: professionshøjskoler)	475 million. DKK	Erik Knudsen	700	7000	Vejle, Odense, Jelling, Svendborg and Skårup.	None	https://www.ucl.dk
Copenhagen Hospitality College, (Danish: Hotel og Restaurantskolen)	Unknown	Unknown	1922	Public and vocational college	Unknown	Søren Kuhlwein Kristiansen	167	6,000	Copenhagen	Unknown	https://hrs.dk
Technical University of Denmark, (Danish: Den Polytekniske Læreanstalt Danmarks Tekniske Universitet)	Det bli'r til noget	It amounts to something	1829	Public university	Unknown	Lars Pallesen	4,500 (2,250 researchers)	7,000	Lyngby, Copenhagen	EUA, CDIO, TIME	https://www.dtu.dk
University College South, (Danish: University College Syd)	Unknown	Unknown	2008	University College, (Danish: professionshøjskoler)	Unknown	Søren Vang Rasmussen	400	3500	Kolding, Haderslev, Aabenraa and Sønderborg.	None	https://ucsyd.dk
West Jutland University College, (Danish: Professionshøjskolen University College Vest)	Unknown	Unknown	2008	University College, (Danish: professionshøjskoler)	Unknown	Unknown	350	3000	Esbjerg	None	http://www.ucvest.dk
IT University of Copenhagen, (Danish: IT-Universitetet i København)	Dedicated to the digital world	None	1999	Public university	Unknown	Mads Tofte	450	2,004 (2010)	Copenhagen	Unknown	http://www.itu.dk
Royal School of Library and Information Science, (Danish: Det Informationsvidenskabelige Akademi, IVA)	None	None	1956	Public university	80 million DKK	Per Hasle	140	1000	Copenhagen, Aalborg	Member of the iSchools - list of I-Schools	https://archive.today/20121217232125/http://www.iva.dk/
Aarhus School of Architecture, (Danish: Arkitektskolen Aarhus)	None	None	1966	Public university	Unknown	Unknown	Unknown	900	Aarhus	Unknown	https://aarch.dk/
Royal Academy of Music in Aarhus, (Danish: Det Jyske Musikkonservatorium)	None	None	1927	Music school	Unknown	Thomas Winther	200	350	Aarhus	Unknown	http://www.musikkons.dk
KaosPilots	The Best School For The World. Change The Game.	None	1991	School of New Business Design & Social Innovation	Unknown	Christer Windeløv-Lidzélius	16	100	Aarhus	Unknown	https://www.kaospilot.dk/
University College Capital, (Danish: Professionshøjskolen UCC)	Unknown	Unknown	2008	University College, (Danish: professionshøjskoler)	Unknown	Laust Joen Jakobsen	Unknown	Unknown	Copenhagen, Bornholm, North Zealand	None	https://www.ucc.dk
University College Sealand, (Danish: University College Sjælland)	Unknown	Unknown	2007	University College, (Danish: professionshøjskoler)	Unknown	Ulla Winther Koch	Unknown	Unknown	Næstved, Roskilde, Slagelse, Storstrøm	None	https://web.archive.org/web/20170727125956/http://ucsj.dk/
