= List of schools in Denmark =

This is an incomplete list of schools in Denmark, listed by region.

== Capital region ==
- Bagsværd Kostskole og Gymnasium
- Bornholms Erhvervsskole
- Christianshavn School
- Copenhagen International School
- Efterslægten
- Frederiksberg Gymnasium
- International School of Hellerup
- Ishøj Gymnasium
- Krebs School
- Krogerup Højskole
- Munkegaard School
- N. Zahle's School
- Nørre Gymnasium
- Ørestad Gymnasium
- Rygaards International School
- Rysensteen Gymnasium
- St. Joseph's School, Roskilde
- Skt. Jørgens Gymnasium

== Central Denmark ==
- Grenaa Gymnasium & HF
- Krabbesholm Højskole
- Langkær Gymnasium & HF
- Performers House
- Ringkjøbing Gymnasium
- Risskov skole
- Samsø Højskole
- Testrup Højskole
- Vestbirk Højskole
- Viborg Katedralskole

== North Denmark ==
- Aalborg Cathedral School
- Aalborghus Gymnasium
- EUC Nord
- Limfjordsskolen
- Tech College Aalborg

== Southern Denmark ==
- Brenderup Folk High School
- Kolding Gymnasium
- Ribe Katedralskole
- Ryslinge Folk High School
- Sabro Korsvejskolen
- Sdr. Nærå Fri- og Efterskole
- Svendborg Gymnasium
- Vejle Idrætshøjskole

== Zealand ==
- Herlufsholm School
- Kalundborg Gymnasium
- Roskilde Gymnasium
- Rødkilde Højskole
- St. Joseph's School, Roskilde
- Sorø Academy
- Vallekilde Folk High School

== Constituent countries ==
=== Faroe Islands ===
- Føroya Studentaskúli og HF-Skeið

=== Greenland ===
- Kangillinguit School

== See also ==
- Education in Denmark
- Higher education in Denmark
- Open access in Denmark
- List of educational institutions in Denmark
