= Via University College =

University college in Central Denmark

- Via University College
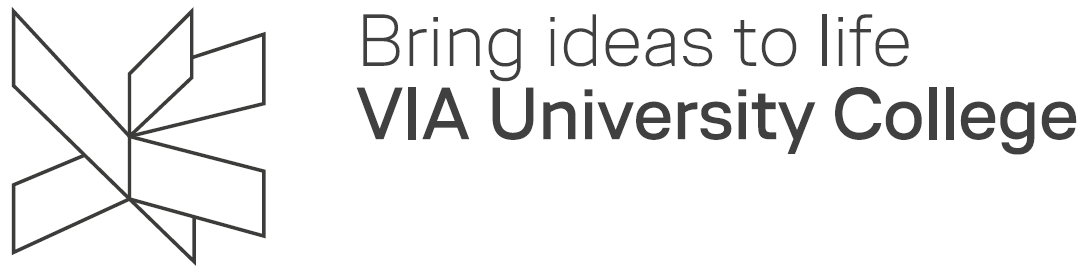
- Type: Public university
- Established: 2008; 18 years ago
- Endowment: DKK 1.6 billion
- Rector: Harald Mikkelsen
- Total staff: 2100 (2023)
- Students: 19,000 (2023)
- Location: Aarhus, Denmark; 56.156°N 10.1906°E
- Campus: Campus Aarhus C, Campus Aarhus N, Campus Horsens (VBI Park), Campus Randers, Campus Viborg and Campus Holstebro as well as other addresses
- Website: en.via.dk
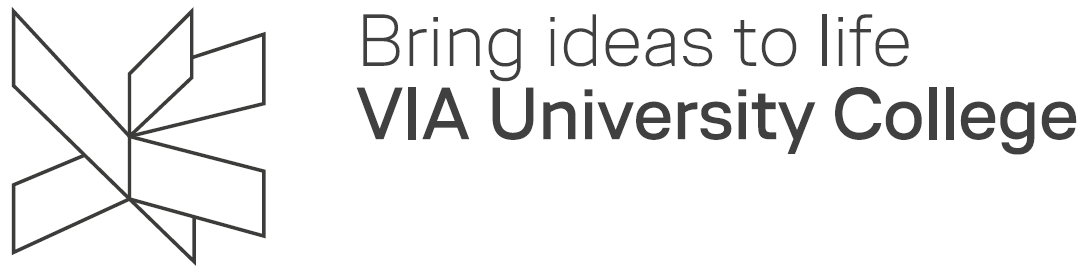

Via University College is a university college (Danish: professionshøjskole) in Central Denmark. It was established in January 2008 and operates eight campuses.

== History ==
University colleges in Denmark were established through a series of mergers of smaller educational institutions in 2007, and Via is one of the university colleges. "Via" is not an abbreviation; its name comes from the Latin word via, meaning "by way of".

From January 2008, all medium higher education in the Central Region previously under CVU (Center for Higher Education) was reorganized into a single unit under Via. As a result of these mergers, Via became the third-largest educational institution, after Copenhagen University and Aarhus University, with approximately 2,000 employees and 20,000 students.

Via University College offers the following vocational bachelor programmes: pedagogy, health professions, and technical-commercial studies. In addition, Via offers a two-year high school exam. Overall, Via offers more than 50 higher education courses in Danish and a number of courses in English. Via also participates in various research and development projects. Via is headquartered in Aarhus, but the activities are anchored across eight campuses spread across 39 locations in the region. Via's annual turnover is 1.6 billion DKK.

=== Applicants and enrollment ===
Most programmes operated by Via University College enroll students twice a year: in February and September. The statistics below encompass both enrollment periods. The number of students Via University College is able to enroll is determined by the Ministry of Education, based on factors average unemployment rates. Thus, a local Via institution might have its enrollment reduced if the unemployment rate in its area of operation is higher than the average, and vice versa.

Applicants and enrolled students from 2010 until 2016
	Applicants	Enrolled	Total	Completed
2010	12,316	5,104	15,894	3,673
2011	14,793	5,445	17,132	3,756
2012	16,230	5,447	18,468	3,811
2013	18,903	5,365	18,940	4,506
2014	21,207	5,384	19,550	4,908
2015	21,851	5,649	19,354	4,806
2016	21,451	5,829	18,991	4,943
2017	20,763	5,600	-	-

== Organisation ==
Via is organised similarly to most universities. At the top is a board of directors, which appoints the rector. The rector heads the executive board, together with the deans. Each faculty has one dean. The largest faculty in terms of students and turnover is the Faculty of Education and Social Studies, followed by the Faculty of Health Sciences and the School of Business, Technology and Creative Industries, and the Faculty of Continuing Education. The faculties are supported by a range of departments such as marketing, corporate finance, and the student administration. They are organised between the executive board and the faculties.

== Campuses ==
Via University College has campuses across Central Region Denmark, in Aarhus, Grenå, Randers, Skive, Viborg, Holstebro, Nørre Nissum, Ikast, Herning, Silkeborg, Skanderborg, and Horsens.

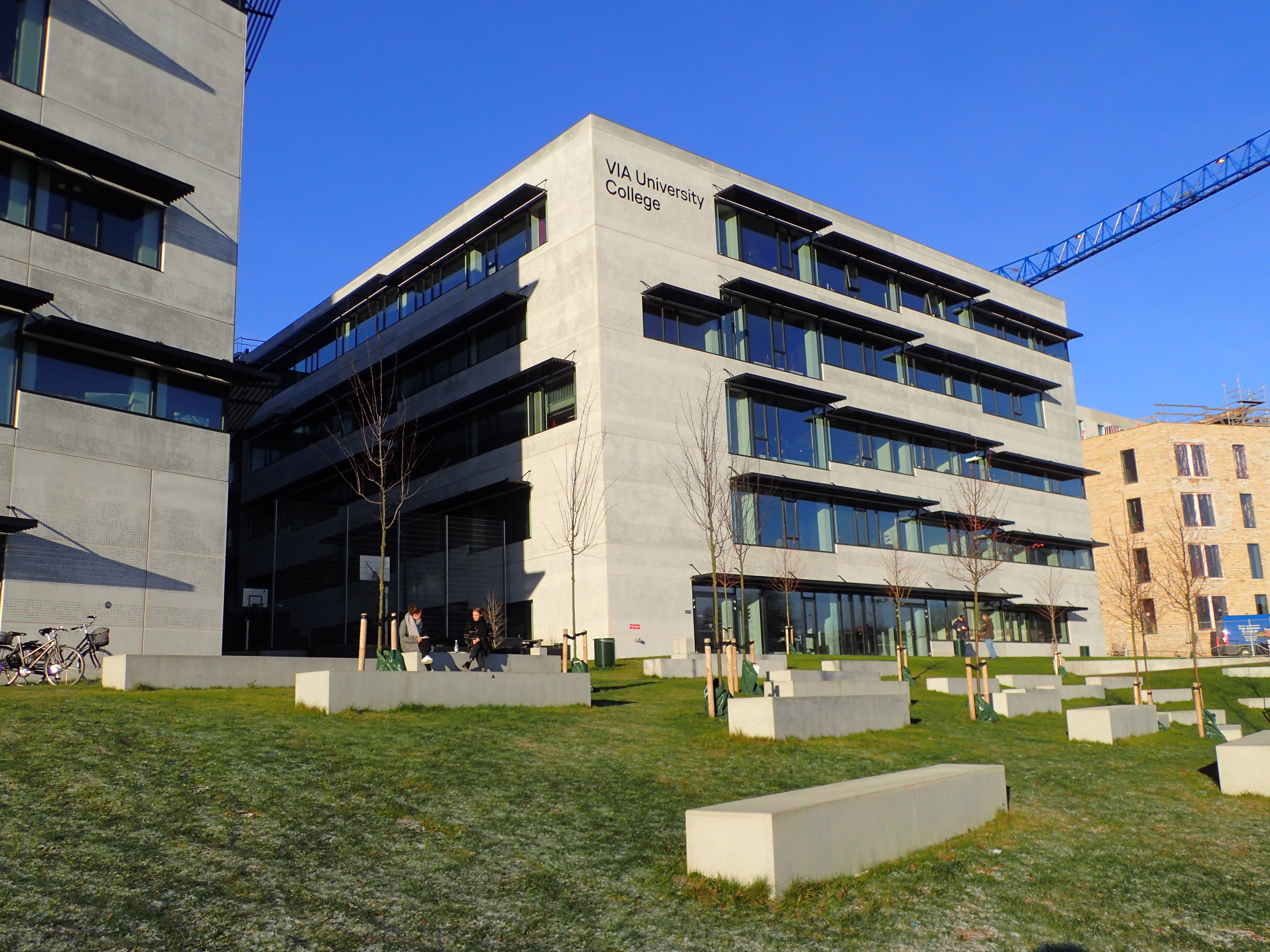
Campus Aarhus C, built in 2015.

=== Campus Aarhus C & N ===
Via University College has its headquarters in Aarhus, where it operates two recently built campuses. The largest is Via Campus Aarhus C, which is located in the residential area called CeresByen in central Aarhus. Campus Aarhus C primarily houses programmes from the Department of Education and Social Studies, as well as assorted business, media, design, architecture, and construction. The smaller campus, Campus Aarhus N, is located in the northern neighbourhood of Skejby, near the Aarhus University Hospital. It houses education programmes from the Department of Health such as nursing and nutritional educations.

=== Campus Horsens ===
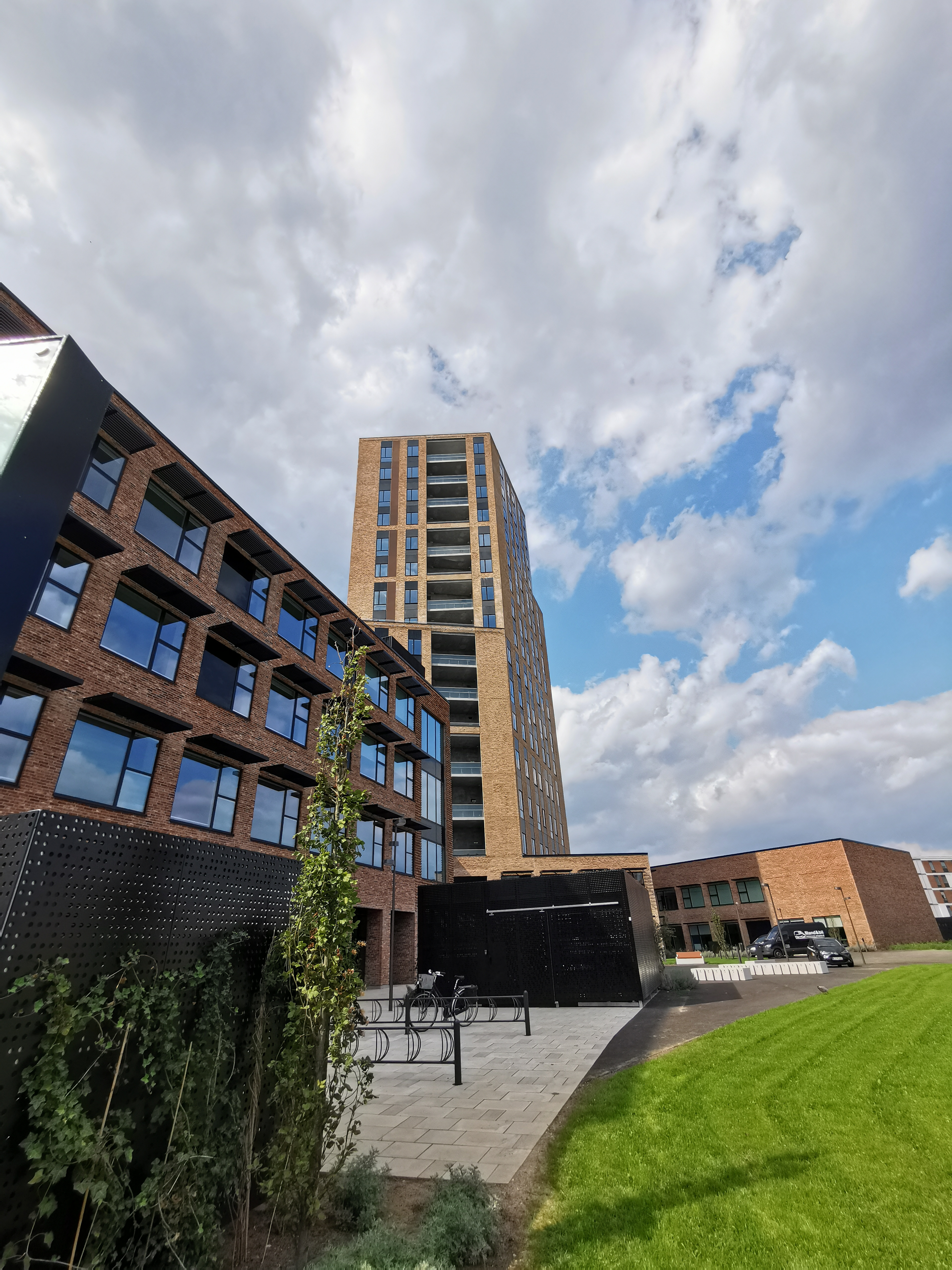
Via New Campus Horsens, 2021

Campus Horsens holds most of the engineering, technical, and business programmes of Via University College, but soon Danish programmes in nursing and in pedagogy will also be present here to increase the range of programmes offered.

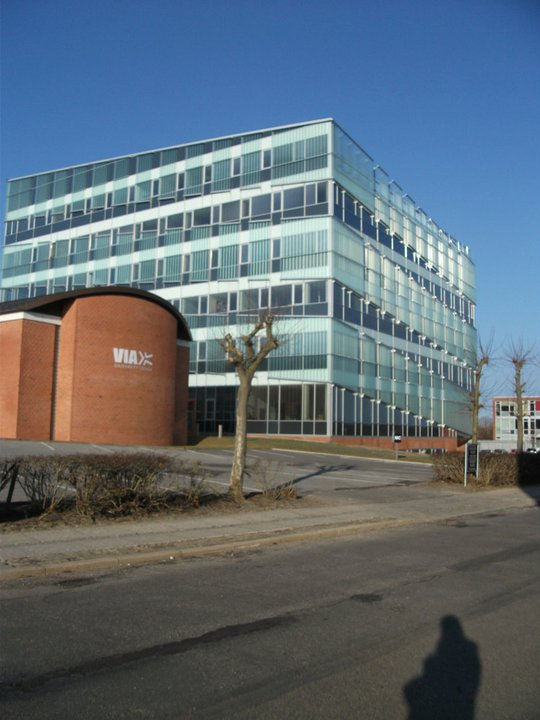
Vitus Bering Innovation (VBI) Park in Horsens.

The increasing campus population is around 4,000 students, of whom approximately half are international students from more than 40 different countries.

New student housing located directly on campus contributes to campus life, as does the student bar, social activities and group work after classes.

Above Campus Horsens towers the recently built 8,000 m² Vitus Bering Innovation Park, named after the famous Horsens resident and Arctic explorer Vitus Bering (1681–1741). The VBI Park also plays an important role in connecting programmes with companies that employ the students after graduation. Another facilitator of contact between students and companies is the Career Service Centre, also based on campus.

In March 2021, a new and improved campus has recently been completed and inaugurated in Horsens.

=== Campus Randers ===
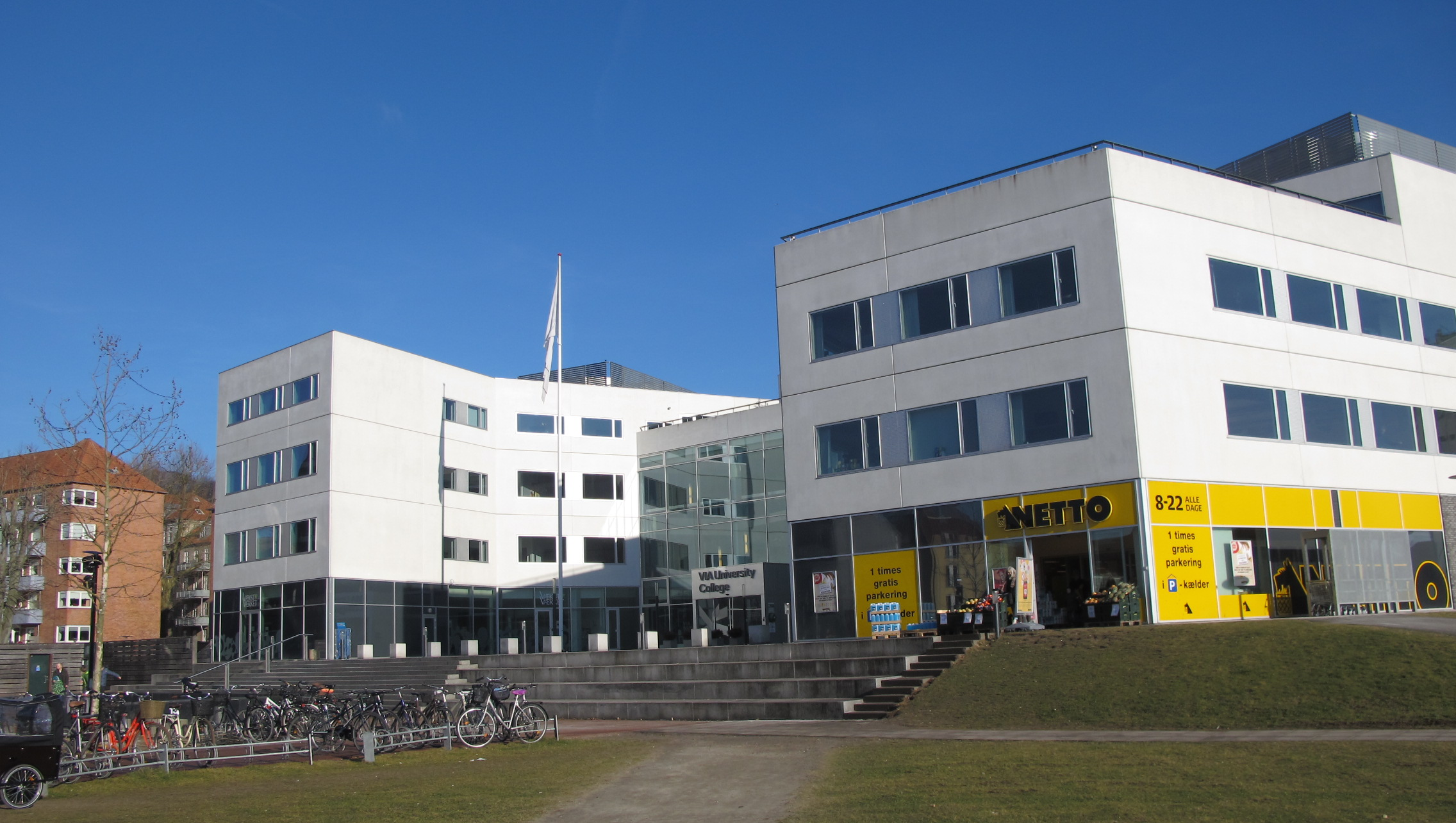
Campus Randers C, Via University College

In Randers, Via University College offers nursing, social education, and psychomotor therapy. The campus is situated in central Randers in a new three story building, which houses the aforementioned educations as well as COK educations. The latter is not offered by Via, but by a third party.

From 2017, Via also offers FIF-courses in Randers, which is a preparation course for refugees and immigrants. Additionally, the social education department offers a six-month 30 ECTS course in the Early Childhood Field.

In early 2018, a part of the teacher training in Aarhus relocated to Randers. The teacher training programme in Aarhus is part of the overall teacher programme.

Approximately 800 students attend the programmes housed at Campus Randers. In addition to the aforementioned educations, Campus Randers also offers counselling in entrepreneurship as part of Via's growth initiatives, in collaboration with the municipality of Randers and the Business Academy Dania.

==== VækstVærket (growth forum) ====
VækstVærket is located on campus Randers, but has its own facilities as well as budget. Via and Dania each have a coordinator, who coordinates activities such as courses and teaching. VækstVærket also offers students excursions to various startup hubs as well as cultural events with students from different countries. Students from Via and Dania can use VækstVærket for studying as well as work on growth projects. In addition, they also have the option of receiving counselling from a professional consultant. VækstVærket also offers various courses in entrepreneurship and a chance to partake in projects about entrepreneurship.

=== Campus Viborg ===
Via campus Viborg houses, among other departments, The Animation Workshop (TAW), which is internationally recognized for animation education by the Animation Career Review. TAW offers BA programmes in Character Animation, Computer Graphic Arts and, Graphic Storytelling, introduced in 2013. Apart from its educational activities, TAW hosts the Viborg Animation Festival, the largest animation festival in Denmark.

=== Campus Silkeborg ===
Via campus Silkeborg provides programmes related to teaching, social education, and nursing.

=== Campus Herning ===
Campus Herning houses one of Scandinavia's largest educational centres within design and business aimed at the furniture, fashion, and lifestyle industry.

=== Campus Holstebro ===
Campus Holstebro is an educational institution with health, educational, social work, and technical educations.

== Degree Programmes ==
The table below lists the various programmes Via offers in English.

Colour	Programme	Duration (full-time study)
	Exchange	Approximately 6 months
	Summer school	Approximately 2 weeks
	AP-programmes	2 years
	Undergraduate	3–4 years
	Graduate	1.5 years

Overview of Via University College's English undergraduate and graduate programmes
Education and social studies	Health sciences	Business, Technology and Creative Industries
Co-creating social change (exchange)	Global Nutrition and Health (BA)	Business and Communication (exchange)
Creative learning and animation (exchange)	Global Nutrition and Health (exchange)	Global Business (BA)
Early Childhood and preschool teaching (exchange)	International Health (summer school)	| International sales and marketing management (BA top up)
Heart - Head - Hands (exchange)	Nursing (exchange)	Marketing management (AP degree)
International class in teacher education (exchange)	Nursing practice (master)	Value Chain management (BA)
Nature in social education (exchange)	Psychomotor therapy (exchange)	Design and Business (BA top up)
Social entrepreneurship (exchange)		Design and Business (exchange)
Sports specialization (summer school)		Design, technology and business (AP degree)
Swimming (summer school)		Materials science and product design (BA)
Teaching English with ICT in Denmark (exchange)		Materials science and product design (exchange)
Working in contexts of disaster or conflict (exchange)		Character animation (BA)
		Computer graphics arts (BA)
		Fashion shoot (summer school)
		Graphic storytelling (BA)
		The Fashion Experience - film and transmedia storytelling (exchange and study abroad)
		Architectural technology and construction management (BA)
		Architectural technology and construction management (exchange)
		Civil engineering (BA)
		Civil engineering (exchange)
		Construction technology (AP degree)
		Engineering in information and communication technology (BA)
		Engineering in information and communication technology (exchange)
		European construction engineering (master)
		Mechanical engineering (BA)
		Mechanical engineering (exchange)
		Supply engineering (BA)
		Supply engineering (online bachelor)

== Via Summer School ==
Every year, Via offers a variety of summer schools at Campus Horsens. All courses are taught in English.

== Partners universities and programmes ==
Via University College is engaged in various international research and development projects, either as the leading institution or as a partner. Projects are initiated under a variety of funding programmes and are often interdisciplinary and cross-sectoral, while rooted within the educational fields of Via's Faculties and Schools.

Via's partners universities include the following:

- California State University East Bay
- Edinburgh Napier University
- Universidad Politécnica de Valencia

Via participates in the following programmes:

- Erasmus (Life Long Learning Programme)/Erasmus+
- Erasmus Mundus
- Leonardo da Vinci
- EU – Australia
- DK – USA/Canada
- Tempus

== See also ==
There are other university college organisations in Denmark:

- University College of Northern Denmark (UCN)
- UCL University College
- West Jutland University College
- University College South Denmark
- University College Sealand
- University College Capital
- Metropolitan University College
