= UCCC =

uccc, UCCC, or variation, may refer to:

- Ulster County Community College, a former name of SUNY Ulster in New York, United States
- Union Colony Civic Center, Greeley, Colorado, United States
- Uniform Consumer Credit Code, a code of conduct for payday loans in Australia
- United Christian Community Church, a church established be by the United Christian College, Hong Kong

== See also ==
- UC3 (disambiguation)
- UC (disambiguation)
