= UC =

UC may refer to:

== Arts and entertainment ==
- University Challenge, a British quiz show
  - University Challenge (New Zealand)
- Universal Century, the Gundam anime's original timeline
- Uc, a defunct British film certificate

== Education ==
- University college
  - List of university colleges

=== Philippines ===
- University of Cebu, Cebu City
- University of the Cordilleras, Baguio

=== United States ===
- University of California, California
- University of Charleston, West Virginia
- University of Chicago, Illinois
- University of Cincinnati, Ohio
- Upsala College, East Orange, New Jersey
- Utica College, Utica, New York
- Harvard Undergraduate Council, a student body

=== Elsewhere ===
- Pontifical Catholic University of Chile, Chile
- University of Cambridge, United Kingdom
- University of Canberra, Australia
- University of Cantabria, Spain
- University of Canterbury, New Zealand
- University of Coimbra, Portugal
- Uva College, Badulla, Sri Lanka
- Uxbridge College, England
- University of Calgary, Canada

== Government and politics ==
- Centrist Union group, in the French Senate
- Undercover, practice of disguising identity for policing or espionage
- Union councils of Pakistan
- Universal Credit, a British social security benefit
- Urban Council, of Hong Kong

== Military and transport ==
- Culver UC, a US Navy drone
- Danish UC submarines (disambiguation) of Peter Madsen
- German Type UC submarine (disambiguation)
- German submarine U-C of WW2

== Science, technology, and mathematics ==
=== Biology and medicine ===
- Ulcerative colitis, a type of inflammatory bowel disease
- Umbilical cord
- Unassisted childbirth, birth without the aid of professional birth attendants

=== Computing and telecommunication ===
- UC Browser, a web browser for mobile devices
- UC Mobile, a Chinese software company
- Universal composability, a cryptographic model for protocols
- Microcontroller (abbreviated "uC" or "μC"), a computer-on-a-chip used to control electronic devices
- Unified communications, the integration of real-time communication services

=== Other uses in science, technology, and mathematics ===
- UC (noise reduction) (Universal Compatible/Universal Compander), a vinyl record noise reduction system in the 1980s
- Ultrasonic consolidation, an additive manufacturing technology
- Uranium carbide, a hard refractive ceramic material
- Uniform polyhedron compound, a type of geometry
- Universal Column, a type of H-beam
- Folding boxboard, a paperboard grade
- Undercarriage, also known as landing gear, on aircraft
- Photon upconversion, an optical phenomenon

== Other uses ==
- Unification Church, a new religious movement
- Unified Cornish, a variety of the Cornish language
- Unit cost, a business measure
- United Center, a sports arena in Chicago
- University City, San Diego, a neighborhood
- Upper case, in orthography and typography, denoting large or capital letters

== See also ==
- U of C (disambiguation)
