= Osteopathy in Europe =

Medical practice

Osteopathy is a primary contact and patient-centred healthcare discipline, that supports a whole-person approach to all aspects of health and healthy development, principally by the practice of manual treatment emphasising the interrelationship of structure and function of the body and facilitating the body’s innate ability to heal itself.

In 2025, there were 79,302 osteopaths in Europe. Of these 45,093 were statutorily regulated and registered osteopaths and it was estimated that 34,207 osteopaths were not statutorily regulated and registered but may be registered with voluntary registering organisations.

== History ==
Osteopathy was brought to the UK, by graduates of the American School of Osteopathy (ASO) in Kirksville, Missouri, founded in 1892 and the very first osteopathic school. These graduates opened their osteopathic practices in the UK from 1902 on. From the UK, osteopathy came to continental Europe, before being introduced to the rest of Europe first through France and later through Belgium.

=== National associations ===
There are several national associations in Europe, where many of them were established during the 80s and the 90s. The British Osteopathic Society was the first one established in 1903, recently renamed as the Institute of Osteopathy.

List of current osteopathic associations in Europe.
Association	Country	established
osteopathie.be	Belgium	1978
Belgische Unie van Osteopaten/Union Belge des Ostéopathes	Belgium	1996
Union Professionnelle de Médecine Ostéopathie	Belgium	2004
Unie voor gediplomeerden in de kinesitherapie en osteopathie	Belgium	2005
Verenigde Osteopaten	Belgium	2023
Cyprus Osteopathic Association	Cyprus	?
Danske Osteopater	Denmark	2013
Balti Osteopaatide Assotsiatsioon	Estonia	?
Suomen Osteopaattiliitto Ry	Finland	1988
Association Française d’Ostéopathie	France	2003
Syndicat Français Des Ostéopathes	France	1973
Verband der Osteopathen Deutschland e.V.	Germany	1994
Πανελλήνιος Σύλλογος Οστεοπαθητικών	Greece	1992
Osteópatafélag Íslands	Iceland	2002
Osteopathic Council of Ireland	Ireland	2013
Registro degli Osteopati d’Italia	Italy	1989
Association Luxembourgeoise des osteopaths	Luxembourg	?
Malta Association of Osteopaths	Malta	2019
Nederlands Register voor Osteopathie	Netherlands	?
Nederlandse Vereniging voor Osteopathie	Netherlands	?
Norsk Osteopatforbund	Norway	1993
Towarzystwo Osteopatów Polskich	Poland	2005
Associação dos Osteopatas de Portugal	Portugal	1990
Associação Independente de Osteopatia	Portugal	2017
Društvo osteopatov Slovenije	Slovenia	?
Federación Española de Osteópatas	Spain	?
Associción de Professionales de Osteopatía	Spain	2007
Registro de Osteópatas de España	Spain	?
Sociedad Europea de Medicina Osteopática	Spain	2000
Svenska Osteopatförbundet	Sweden	1983
Institute of Osteopathy	United Kingdom	1998

== Regulation ==
The recognition/regulation of the osteopathic profession varies from country to country; in some countries osteopathy is recognised and regulated, in others it is recognised but not yet regulated or also not recognised and not regulated. Regulated by law normally means that the title ‘osteopath’ is protected by law, and that osteopaths and/or osteopathic physicians can only use the titles if they meet certain statutory conditions in terms of competencies and registration and/or licensure. This would normally require statutory registration, as the health professional must comply with set standards of practice that protect the patients they treat; statutory regulation is set out in national or state/provincial law.

As of 2025, osteopathy or osteopathic medicine is regulated in twelve European countries: Cyprus, Denmark, Finland, France, Iceland, Liechtenstein, Luxemburg, Malta, Norway, Portugal, Switzerland, and the UK.

Where osteopathy is regulated, there is often a legal requirement for continuing professional development. In countries where osteopathy has voluntary registration there are informal requirements, usually defined by national associations.

=== Osteopathy Europe ===
Osteopathy Europe (OE) is an organisation which represents professional associations of osteopaths from different European countries in order to promote standards, regulation and recognition for osteopaths in Europe. OE is a member association of the Osteopathic International Alliance (OIA), which is an organisation promoting the advancement and unity of the global osteopathic profession.

Osteopathy Europe (OE) has four committees: the Research Committee, Education Committee, Communication Task Force, and Policy Committee. The Research Committee promotes research impact, facilitates collaboration, and disseminates evidence-informed practices to improve patient care. The Education Committee develops and reviews educational policies and standards, providing guidance on education and its links to research and professional regulation. The Communication Task Force advises on best practices for promoting osteopathy, acting as a brand guardian and enhancing communication between OE and its members. The Policy Committee develops and reviews policies on osteopathic development, advising member organisations on statutory regulation.

== Education ==
Most osteopathic practitioners are trained to Level 6 or Level 7 standard of education (Bachelor or Master level). While it is recognised that osteopathic training varies between countries, there are two standards that are widely used in European osteopathic training: (1) European CEN-standard, and (2) WHO Benchmarks for Training in Osteopathy. European standardisation (EN 16686) defines, i.e., how many training hours a program must have, how many ECTS are needed, and how many individual patients osteopathic trainees have to consult in order to qualify for the exam. WHO’s benchmarks for osteopathic education describes sufficient level of training, clinical competence, and standards for safe practice.
