= Andreas Rasch-Christensen =

Andreas Rasch Christensen (born 2 June 1971) is a Danish education researcher and director of research and development in the division of Education and Social Sciences at VIA University College.

== Early life and education ==
Rasch-Christensen was born in Kolding and grew up in Haderslev. He earned his Cand.mag. in English and social studies at Aarhus University in 1998 and a PhD in 2009 from its Institute of Education, Danmarks Institut for Pædagogik og Uddannelse.

== Career ==
From 1998 to 2007, he was lector of teacher education in Skive (now a part of VIA University College). In 2007, he became director of education, and in 2010, director of research and development for VIA's division of Education and Social Sciences.

His research focuses on primary schools, and he frequently appears in media debates on primary education. He is an expert on inclusion of special-needs children. In the 1990s he was also active in investigating the unexpectedly poor showing of Danish children in the Programme for International Student Assessment. In his position as divisional director of research, he has spoken about teacher training as well as student learning.

Rasch-Christensen has participated in many consultative bodies under the Danish Ministry of Education, including the Rådet for Børns Læring.

== Personal life ==
Rasch-Christensen blogged about football for TV 2 until 2015, when accusations of plagiarism were raised concerning a book he published about football, and some passages in blog entries.

He lives in Aarhus with his wife and their two children.
