= UC3 =

UC3 may refer to:

- UC3 Nautilus, a private Danish submarine
- SM UC-3, a German submarine of World War One
- German Type UC III submarine, a World War One class of submarine
- UC 3 (album)

== See also ==
- UC (disambiguation)
- UCCC (disambiguation)
