= Østermarkskolen =

School in Aars, Denmark

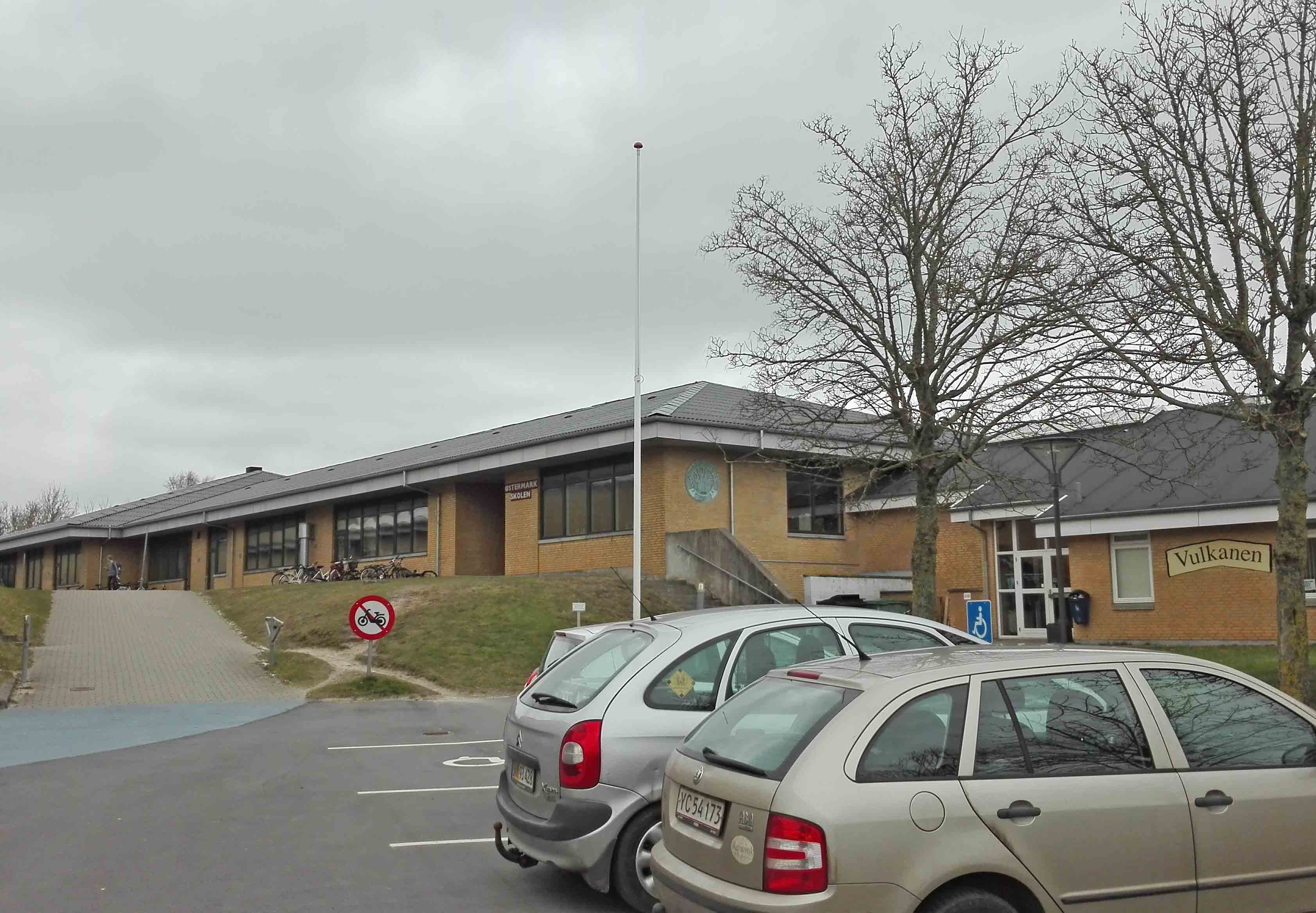
- Østermarkskolen and Vulkanen

Location
- Aars, Vesthimmerland Municipality, North Denmark Region, 9600; Denmark
- Coordinates: 56.81°N 9.53°E

Information
- Principal: Solveig Østergaard Kristensen
- Enrollment: 645 (2016)

Østermarkskolen (English: East-field-school) is one of two city schools located in Aars city, Denmark, the other one being Aars school. There are also a third school, Vestermarkskolen which teaches students with autism, Down syndrome and multi-disabled. The school is split up in wings which is called Fløje in Danish, in Fløj I has kindergarten class to 2nd grade, Fløj II has 4th grade to 5th grade, Fløj III has 6th grade to 8th grade, Fløj IV has 3rd grade and 9th grade is placed in Fløj VI.

There are 45 teachers employed, 3 kindergarten class leaders, 15 educators, 1 school principal, 1 deputy school principal, 1 SFO leader, 1 SFO deputy head, 2 secretaries, 1 service manager, 1 service employee (part timer), 1 person in 50-50 job order, 5 people in flexjob, 6 cleaning assistants.

== Outdoor ==
The school have basketball court, and some soccer fields and in 2016/2017 the school got a disk golf course. The school followed the example of Aalborg, Aarhus and Randers since those cities already had a disk golf course. The idea to bring a disk golf course to Østermarkskolen was proposed by two teachers: Lars Kjølby Lund, a mathematics and sports teacher, and Christian Bunk Svane, a sports and geography teacher. The courses are between 50 and 150 meters long and there is six holes/lanes. It can be freely used by all, after school time.

== See also ==
- List of schools in Denmark
