= University colleges in Denmark =

Type of Danish tertiary education institution

University colleges in Denmark (Danish: professionshøjskoler, lit. 'professional high school'; the English term is also used) are a type of higher education institution mostly offering medium higher education (MVU) and diploma courses, i.e., the professionsbachelor profession bachelor degree.

For a full overview of institutions of higher education in Denmark, see List of universities and colleges in Denmark.

Danish university colleges offer courses that can lead up to a bachelor's degree. University colleges also offer short higher education (KVU) degrees such as academy profession degree programmes (Danish: erhvervsakademiuddannelse) offered as business academies.

Danish Education system
Requirement	Theoretically way	Practical/Vocal way	American type	Level
Mandatory	Dagpleje	Dagpleje	Daycare	1
Mandatory	Børnehave	Børnehave	Kindergarten	2
Mandatory	Folkeskole	Folkeskole	Elementary school	3
Voluntary	Efterskole	Efterskole	No American equivalent	3,5 (skippable part)
Voluntary		Erhversskole	Tradeschool	4 (practical training)
Voluntary	Gymnasium		High School	4 (Theoretically)
Voluntary		Erhvervsakademiuddannelse	universities of applied sciences	5 (50% theory. 50% practical training)
Voluntary	Universitet		University	5 (Theoretically)

== History ==
In July 2007, the Danish Parliament passed a new law regarding the Danish university colleges. The Ministry of Education under Section 50 of the Act on university colleges established the following eight colleges, which were established in January 2008: University College of Northern Denmark, VIA University College, University College Lillebaelt, West Jutland University College, University College South, University College Sealand, University College Capital, Metropolitan University College.

Since 2008, there have been three mergers, reducing the number of university colleges to six

- West Jutland University College and University College South Denmark on 1 May 2010, forming University College South Denmark
- University College Capital and Metropolitan University College on 1 March 2018, forming University College Copenhagen
