= St. Lawrence's Church, Roskilde =

St. Lawrence's Church
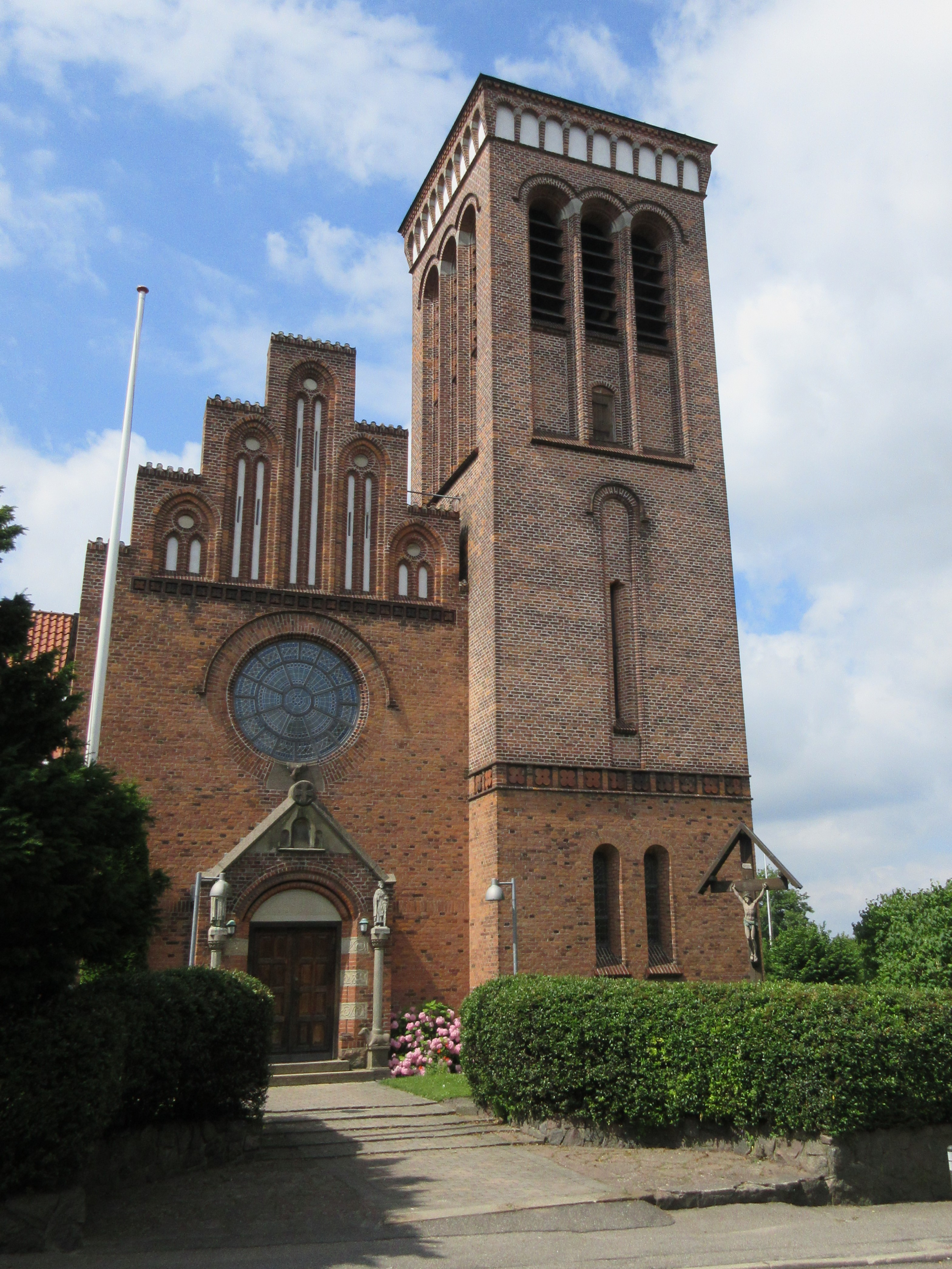
- St. Lawrence's Church seen from Frederiksborgvej
- St. Lawrence's Church
- 55°38′40.7″N 12°4′59.6″E
- Location: Roskilde
- Country: Denmark
- Denomination: Roman Catholic

History
- Status: Church
- Founded: 1914
- Dedication: Lawrence of Rome

Architecture
- Functional status: Active
- Architect: Jacob van Gils

Administration
- Diocese: Copenhagen

St. Lawrence's Church (Danish: Sankt Laurentii kirke) is a Roman Catholic church in Roskilde, Denmark.

== History ==
Pater A. Kerckhoffs, pater Blois and brother Bonifatius, who all belonged to the Compagnie de Marie, came to Roskilde in 1901. It was the Kerckhoffs' intention to build a Roman Catholic church, school and hospital in the city. A temporary chapel, the first of its kind in Roskilde since the Reformation in 1536, was inaugurated in a former stable of the new rectory on 13 July 1902. In 1904–05, a group of Daughters of Wisdom founded St. Joseph's School and St. Mary's Hospital on a site on the other side of the street. Jacob van Gils, a Dutch architect, was commissioned to design a church building for a site adjacent to the rectory. Construction began in 1913 and the church was inaugurated by bishop Johannes von Euch on 19 April 1914. The church was damaged by fire in 1940 but was subsequently restored.

== Use ==
Mass in Danish is held three times a week (Tuesday, Friday and Sunday). Mass in Polish is held on the second Saturday each month and in English on the third Saturday each month.
