= Ringkjøbing Gymnasium =

Secondary school in Denmark

Coordinates: 56.0936°N 8.2603°E

Information
- School type: Gymnasium
- Website: www.rkbgym.dk

Ringkjøbing Gymnasium is a small gymnasium (secondary school) in the town of Ringkøbing, Denmark.
