= List of colleges and schools of Arizona State University =

This is a list of colleges and schools of Arizona State University. Most of ASU's academic programs are spread across four campuses in the Phoenix Metropolitan Area, ASU Online, and ASU Local. The table below indicates enrollment by college, with an indication of which metropolitan campuses are represented.

	Phoenix Metropolitan Area				ASU Local			ASU Online
College	Downtown	Polytechnic	Tempe	West	ASU Los Angeles	ASU Lake Havasu	ASU Hawaii	ASU Online
Barrett, The Honors College	X	X	X		X			X
College of Liberal Arts and Sciences			X			X		X
College of Health Solutions	X	X	X	X	X	X		X
College of Global Futures			X		X		X	X
Edson College of Nursing and Health Innovation	X			X	X	X		X
Ira A. Fulton Schools of Engineering		X	X			X	X	X
Thunderbird School of Global Management				X	X			X
Graduate Education	X	X	X	X	X			X
Herberger Institute for Design and the Arts			X					X
Mary Lou Fulton Teachers College	X	X	X	X				X
New College of Interdisciplinary Arts and Sciences				X				X
Sandra Day O'Connor College of Law	X							X
College of Integrative Sciences and Arts	X	X	X			X		X
W. P. Carey School of Business		X	X	X				X
Walter Cronkite School of Journalism and Mass Communication	X							X
Watts College of Public Service & Community Solutions	X				X	X		X
X = Programs offered at this campus								
