= U of C =

U of C refers to a number of institutions of higher education around the world, including the following:

Australia

- University of Canberra (Australian Capital Territory)

Canada

- University of Calgary (Alberta)

New Zealand

- University of Canterbury (Christchurch)

Portugal

- University of Coimbra

Spain

- University of Cantabria

United Kingdom

- University of Cambridge

United States

- University of California system
- University of Charleston (West Virginia)
- University of Chicago (Illinois)
- University of Cincinnati (Ohio)
- University of Colorado system, officially uses the acronym CU
- University of Connecticut
