= St. Joseph's School, Roskilde =

St. Joseph's School
- Sankt Josefs Skole
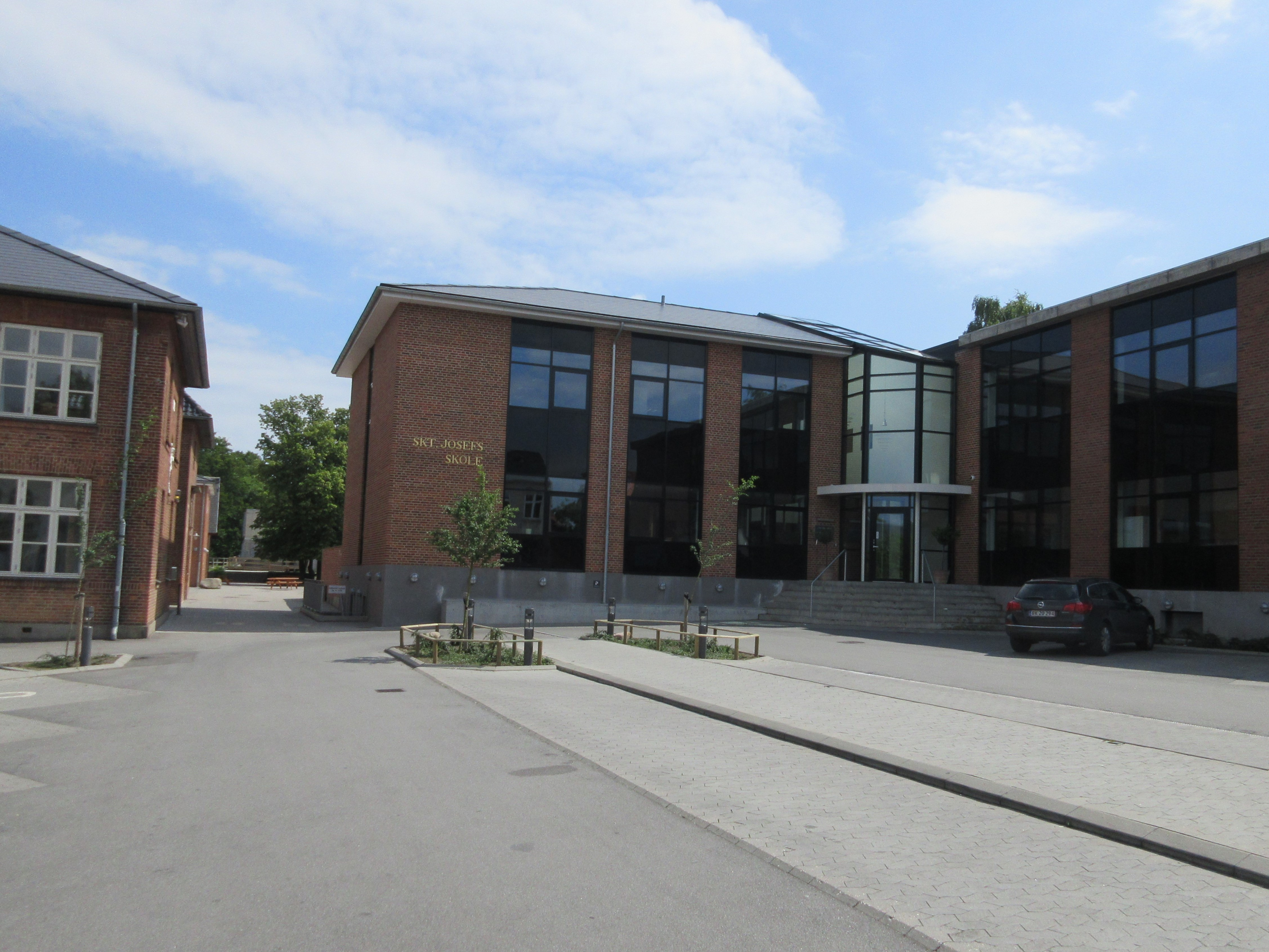

Location
- Frederiksborgvej 10, 4000 Roskilde; 55°38′39.6″N 12°5′3.6″E

Information
- School type: Elementary Private
- Established: 1904; 122 years ago
- Principal: Principal: Mads Frost Hansen Head of International: Kevin Goggins
- Staff: 110
- Grades: Year 1 to Year 11 (5-16 years old)- International Department; 0. klasse to 10. klasse (6-16 years old)- Danish Department
- Gender: Co-ed
- Age: 5 to 16
- Enrolment: +1000 (2018)
- Language: English/Danish
- Website: http://sktjosef.com

St. Joseph's School (Danish: Sankt Josefs Skole) is an independent, Roman Catholic school in Roskilde, Denmark. The school has both an international and Danish department with a total of more than 1,000 pupils.

== History ==
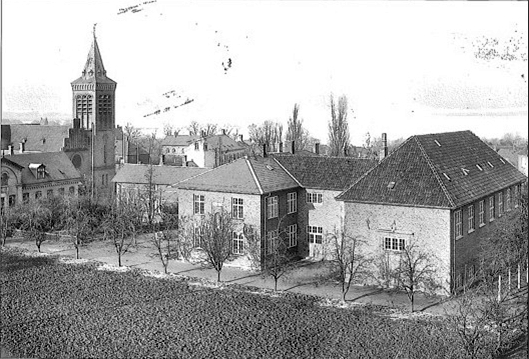
Vintage photo of the school

A group of Daughters of Wisdom nuns settled in Roskilde in 1901. They came to Denmark as a result of the separation of the church from the state in France. They established St. Joseph's School and the adjacent St. Mary's Hospital in 1904.

They were also involved in the establishment of St Lawrence's Church on the opposite side of the street.

The school was initially a girls' school and all teaching was conducted by nuns. Later, they began to use trained teachers, and boys were accepted as pupils from 1924.

In 2012, the International Department opened with its first thirteen students.

== Today ==
The school has both an international and Danish department with a total of more than 1000 pupils. The Danish department covers reception class to 10th grade of the Danish school curriculum. The International department covers Year 1 to Year 11 (age 5 to 16) and is based on the Cambridge International Education programme.
