= Payday loans in Australia =

Payday loans in Australia are part of the small loans market, which was valued at around $400 million a year in the 12 months to June 2014.

The growth of this market mirrors the growth in Canada, the United Kingdom, and the United States. Because the market for small loans is becoming more defined, the regulatory authorities and the larger financial organizations are beginning to take a much closer interest.

Most fringe lending is now covered by the Uniform Consumer Credit Code (UCCC); but, in the past this industry was not very highly regulated, and some lenders still continue to use loopholes to avoid the UCCC. A report from 4 Corners found that some lenders utilise bait and switch methods to circumvent laws regarding establishment fees and interest. Payday lenders have also come under fire due to accusations of predatory lending and charging excessively high interest rates.

For payday loan amounts up to $2,000, Australia has a fee cap of 24% per $100 borrowed, made up of a 20% establishment fee and a 4% monthly fee.

== Enforcement action by ASIC ==
In 2016, Australian Securities and Investments Commission (ASIC) targeted lenders who offered payday loans to the Australian public.

The lenders that faced enforcement action as a result of ASIC's crack down include Fair Go Finance, Nimble (previously Cash Doctors), and Cash Converters. The infringements specified ranged from overcharging on interest and establishment fees to not adequately assessing their customers financial circumstances.

In May 2018 Cash Converters was again fined by ASIC for poor debt collection practices.

== Government legislation ==
In 2017 the Australian Federal Government announced that it was drafting new legislation designed to protect vulnerable Australians for payday loans, consumer leases and similar products. The legislation was based on a 24 recommendations submitted by a government review on small amount credit contract law.

However in May 2018, after the legislation was still not passed, the Government was accused by the Opposition of shelving the proposals following pressure from industry lobbyists.
