= Samsø Højskole =

Defunct folk high school in Denmark

Coordinates: 55.8014°N 10.5567°E

Information
- Established: 1984
- Closed: 2012

Samsø Højskole was a folk high school on the island of Samsø in Denmark. It was founded in 1984. The courses were focused on nature, photography and art. Since 2002 courses were focused on obesity, weight loss, exercise, and healthy eating. Courses were offered twice a year, in September and January.

The school was forced to close in 2012, due to economical hardships.
