= Academic grading in Denmark =

In Denmark, the educational system has historically used a number of different systems of grading student performances, several of which are described below. The current grading system is the 7-trins-skala (7-step-scale) which replaced the 13-skala in 2006.

== Current scale ==
Starting with the academic year 2005–06, a new scale was introduced, 7-trins-skalaen ("7-step-scale"; colloquially dubbed the 12-scale), designed to be compatible with the ECTS-scale:

Grade	Description		Equivalents			
Grade	Description		13-scale	ECTS	U.S.	UK
12	excellent	high level of command of all aspects – no or only a few minor weaknesses (Note: "12: For an excellent performance displaying a high level of command of all aspects of the relevant material, with no or only a few minor weaknesses.")	11/13	A	A+, A	1st
10	very good	high level of command of most aspects – only minor weaknesses (Note: "10: For a very good performance displaying a high level of command of most aspects of the relevant material, with only minor weaknesses.")	10	B	A−	2:1
7	good	good command – some weaknesses (Note: "7: For a good performance displaying good command of the relevant material but also some weaknesses.")	8/9	C	B+, B	2:2
4	fair	some command – some major weaknesses (Note: "4: For a fair performance displaying some command of the relevant material but also some major weaknesses.")	7	D	B−	3rd
02	adequate	the minimum requirements for acceptance (Note: "02: For a performance meeting only the minimum requirements for acceptance.")	6	E	C	Pass
00	inadequate	does not meet the minimum requirements for acceptance (Note: "00: For a performance which does not meet the minimum requirements for acceptance.")	03/5	Fx	D	Fail
−3	unacceptable	unacceptable in all respects (Note: "-3: For a performance which is unacceptable in all respects.")	00	F	F	Fail

The first 0 in 00 and 02 is used to prevent fraud with grades.

Furthermore, Undervisningsministeriet (the Ministry of Education) will adapt to a more international way of grading, by handing out a set number of grades per class. This is because in other countries, the grade A (12) is given twice as often as it is in Denmark (because of strict grading on absolute standards).

== Previous scales ==
=== 1788: Latin scale ===
The Latin scale had five steps:

- Laudabilis præ ceteris
- Laudabilis
- Haud illaudabilis
- Non contemnendus
- 0

0 was an outright failing grade – there was a limitation on the number of non contemendus there could be in a passing student's examination. The highest grade, laudabilis præ ceteris was explicitly named a grade for exceptional purposes only.

=== 1805: Ørsted scale ===
The first version of the Ørsted scale had six steps:

- Ug – udmærket godt – excellently good (numeral value: 8)
- Mg – meget godt – very good (7)
- G – godt – good (5)
- Tg – temmelig godt – pretty good (1)
- Mdl – mådeligt – all right (−7)
- Slet – bad (−23)

A student could not pass an exam if he/she had got mdl in Danish essay or Latin or slet in Latin essay.

In 1845 the numeral values were added in order to enable the calculation of an average grade – also the g was named the minimum passing grade.

=== 1871: Extended Ørsted scale ===
In 1871 the Ørsted scale was extended with plus and minus-steps, and numeral values were added accordingly.

- Ug (8)
- Ug− (7 2/3)
- Mg+ (7 1/3)
- Mg (7)
- Mg− (6 1/3)
- G+ (5 2/3)
- G (5)
- G− (3 2/3)
- Tg+ (3 1/3)
- Tg (1)
- Tg− (−1 2/3)
- Mdl+ (−4 1/3)
- Mdl (−7)
- Mdl− (−12 1/3)
- Slet+ (−17 2/3)
- Slet (−23)

The g was still the minimum passing grade.

=== 1903: Numeral scale ===
In 1903 the Ørsted-scale was scrapped for a numeral one, with five steps:

- 8
- 6
- 4
- 2
- 0

8 and 0 were – like laudabilis præ ceteris – exceptional grades. You would fail if you had two or more zeroes in your exam.

=== 1911: New numeral scale ===
In 1911 another numeral scale was introduced:

- 6
- 5
- 4
- 3
- 2
- 0

4 was the minimum passing grade.

=== 1919: Extended Ørsted scale ===
In 1919 the extended Ørsted scale returned, with numerals.

=== 1943: Modified extended Ørsted scale ===
This version, introduced in 1943, changed the numerals (essentially by adding 7 to the former numbers) and removed the mdl−- and slet+-grades:

- Ug (15)
- Ug− (14 2/3)
- Mg+ (14 1/3)
- Mg (14)
- Mg− (13 1/3)
- G+ (12 2/3)
- G (12)
- G− (10 2/3)
- Tg+ (9 1/3)
- Tg (8)
- Tg− (5 1/3)
- Mdl+ (2 2/3)
- Mdl (0)
- Slet (−16)

=== 1963: 13-scale ===
The 13-scale was introduced in 1963 and used until 2006 (2007 in universities). The scale started out as a relative scale but has since its introduction in 1963 changed to an absolute scale at all levels of education.

- 13 – given for exceptionally independent and excellent performance.
- 11 – given for independent and excellent performance
- 10 – given for excellent but not particularly independent performance
- 9 – given for good performance, a little above average
- 8 – given for average performance
- 7 – given for mediocre performance, slightly below average
- 6 – given for just acceptable performance
- 5 – given for hesitant and not satisfactory performance
- 03 – given for very hesitant, very insufficient and unsatisfactory performance
- 00 – given for completely unacceptable performance

The gaps between 00 & 03, 03 & 5 and 11 & 13 are there to signify a larger difference between those grades. The leading 0 in 00 and 03 is used to prevent fraud with grades. The lowest passing grade is 6 and 00, 03 and 5 are failing grades.

The highest grade 13 and the lowest grade 00 are the grades most rarely given.

00 is nearly impossible to achieve, presuming one knows even a single fact taught in that particular class. It is given for a truly incompetent performance. At exams, 00 is given to students attending, but who cannot answer a single question. Absentees get a "-" and aren't allowed to attend a second exam.

13 is a fairly rare grade outside of exams and requires a performance way beyond the expected. One of the reasons why the 13 scale was replaced with the 7 scale was because of the grade 13. 13s are only given to the students that have gone above and beyond the stated curriculum. To gain it you needed to know more than what was taught in class. It required truly independent study. As no other EU countries used grades above perfect understanding of the curriculum, 13 was untranslatable to other grading systems.

In the table below, the Danish grading scale is compared with the ECTS and the U.S. academic grading scales (4.0/4.3/4.5) by World Education Services.

Definition	EXCELLENT		VERY GOOD	GOOD		SATISFACTORY	PASSED	FAILED		
"13" scale	13	11	10	9	8	7	6	5	03	00
"7" scale	12	12	10	7	7	4	02	00	00	−3
ECTS scale	A	A	B	C	C	D	E	Fx	Fx	F
American scale (4.0)	A	A−	B+	B	B−	C+	C	D	F	F
American scale (4.3)	A+	A	A−	B+	B	B−	C	D	F	F
American scale (4.5)	A+	A+	A	B+	B+	B	C+	D	F	F

The average of grades given in Danish secondary schools in 2003 was 8.22.

This scale was replaced by the 7-step scale in 2005; see above.
