= German Type UC submarine =

German Type UC submarine may refer to:

- German Type UC I submarine of WW1
- German Type UC II submarine of WW1
- German Type UC III submarine of WW1
