= Royal School of Library and Information Science =

Library school under the University of Copenhagen

- Det Informationsvidenskabelige Akademi
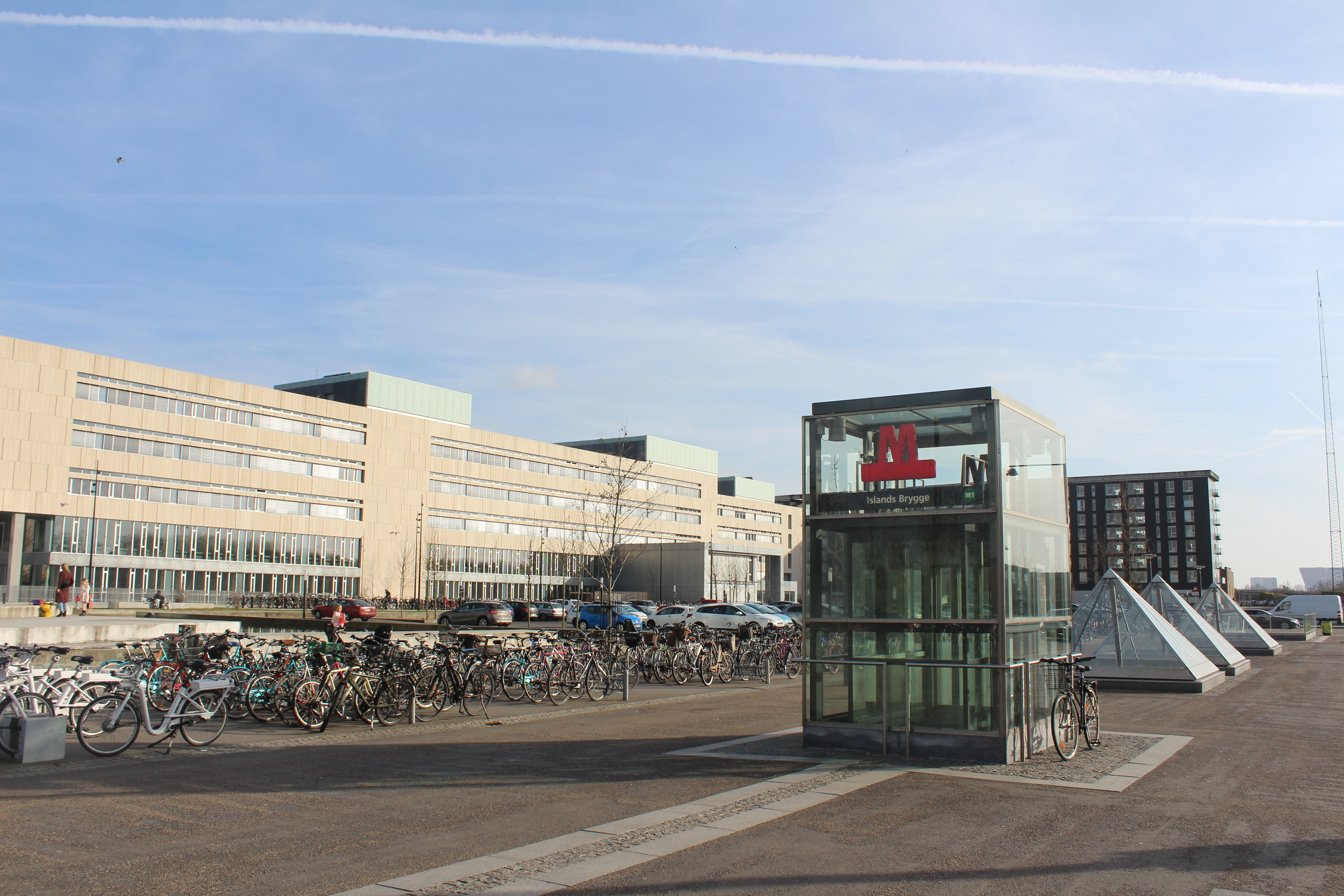
- Type: Information school
- Active: 1956; 70 years ago – 2017; 9 years ago
- Parent institution: University of Copenhagen
- Director: Jens-Erik Mai
- Students: 800
- Location: Copenhagen, Denmark; 55°39′22.47″N 12°35′55.63″E
- Website: iva.ku.dk/english/

The Royal School of Library and Information Science (abbr. RSLIS, Danish: Det Informationsvidenskabelige Akademi) is a school under the University of Copenhagen that provides higher education in the field of library and information science. It has now merged with another department to Department of Communication. It is based in Copenhagen, Denmark. It is a member of iSchools, a consortium directed to understanding the role of information in nature and human culture. There has also been a location in Aalborg, however this campus was shut down in the summer of 2017.

== History ==
The school was an independent institution from 1956 to 2013. It was founded in 1956 and replaced the Danish State Library School that had been established in 1918. In 1973, RSLIS set up a library school branch in Aalborg. Up to 1969 RSLIS offered a sandwich course leading solely to the qualification of public librarian. Those graduating with the Diploma in public librarianship would take up positions as librarians in public libraries (Section I). In 1969, RSLIS extended its course offerings to include a specialised diploma programme directed towards national, research and academic libraries (within the framework of Section II). In 1985, the two librarianship programmes were merged into a joint library degree programme. In 1998, the school was granted university status. In 2004 the first PhD thesis in Library and Information Science was defended and in 2006 the first doctoral degree was awarded. In 2010, the institution changed its name from Danmarks Biblioteksskole to Det Informationsvidenskabelige Akademi (In English still "Royal School of Library and Information Science"). On 1 April 2013 the RSLIS was merged with the University of Copenhagen. On 1 December 2017 it changed name to Department of Information Studies, and on 1 September 2019 it merged with the Department of Media, Cognition and Communication into Department of Communication, University of Copenhagen.

== Locations ==
RSLIS is located in Copenhagen, South Campus of University of Copenhagen. There was until the summer of 2017 a satellite department in Aalborg. In Aalborg, the RSLIS location was in the University of Aalborg campus area.

== Academic programmes ==
The school offers an undergraduate Bachelor of Library and Information Science, a so-called Librarian IVA qualification, a 2-year Master of Library and Information Science (M.L.I.Sc. degree) along with a PhD degree programme. Also offered are a range of specialised courses including a one-year, post-professional Master of Library and Information Science degree, diploma courses as well as continuing education options including short courses and theme-days.

In 2008, the contents of the 3-year Bachelor of Library and Information Science course was revised with the focus being placed at knowledge design and knowledge media. Students are offered course units and seminar options covering, among other things, media theories, forms of knowledge, information architecture, information seeking and retrieval, communication, knowledge management and user behaviour.

The two-year Master of Library and Information Science degree programme was also revised in 2008, providing students with new possibilities of taking options covering constituting as well as free modules. The constituting modules are rooted in the school's six research programmes with the free modules to a greater extent being offered in relation to specific research fields and having the nature of scientific workshop. Students are also offered the possibility of toning their individual programmes in the context of the Masters programme.

== Research ==
Research at the Royal School of Library and Information Science is organised in six research programmes:

- Libraries and Innovative Processes
- Research and Research Policy
- Information Systems and Interaction Design
- Information Literacy and Practice
- Cultural Mediation
- Knowledge and Information Theory

== Cooperative agreements with other universities and colleges ==
- Cooperation agreement with Department of Communication at Aalborg University in 2008.
- Cooperation agreement with Faculty of Social Sciences at Aalborg University.
- Cooperation agreement with Department of Scandinavian Studies and Linguistics at University of Copenhagen in 2009.
- Cooperation agreement with School of Information Management at Wuhan University in 2009.
