= ECTS grading scale =

Pan-European school grading system

The ECTS grading scale was a grading system for higher education institutions defined in the European Credit Transfer and Accumulation System (ECTS) framework by the European Commission. Since many grading systems co-exist in Europe and, considering that interpretation of grades varies considerably from one country to another, if not from one institution to another, the ECTS grading scale was developed to provide a common measure and facilitate the transfer of students and their grades between European higher education institutions, by allowing national and local grading systems to be interchangeable. Grades were reported on a carefully calibrated and uniform A-to-F scale combined with keywords and short qualitative definitions. Each institution makes its own decision on how to apply the ECTS grading scale to its system.

The ECTS grade was not meant to replace the local grades but to be used optionally and additionally to effectively "translate" and "transcript" a grade from one institution to another. The ECTS grade was indicated alongside the mark awarded by the host institution on the student's transcript of records. The receiving institutions then converted the ECTS grade to their own system. Higher education institutions were recommended (though not forced) to provide ECTS grades for all of their students and to take into account the ECTS grades awarded by other institutions. A certain amount of flexibility was advised, since the ECTS grading scale was designed to improve transparency of a variety of grading systems and could not, by itself, cover all possible cases.

The unified grading system was abandoned in 2009 in favour of institutions providing grade distribution tables showing the statistical distribution of grades in their national or institutional system.

== Requirements ==
The main requirements for establishing ECTS grades are the availability of sufficiently detailed primary data, cohorts of sufficient size to ensure validity, proper statistical methods and regular quality control of the results obtained through the use of the scale.

== First version (2003–2008) ==
To tackle the problem of the different approaches to grading across European educational systems, in the past years ECTS guidelines suggested that, in addition to their national scale, European institutions might use a European grading scale as a translation device into other grading systems. Such European scale was based on the statistical distribution of passing grades in each programme, which showed how the national scale was actually being used in that context and allowed for comparison with the statistical distribution of grades in a parallel programme of another institution.

As a first step, the implementation of the ECTS scale required the collection of statistical data in the institutions who were willing to participate in the scheme to make their grades more transparent. In educational systems where ranking of students in each course unit/module was a standard procedure, statistical data could be provided for the very cohort in which the grade had been obtained. In the other cases, the statistical distribution was based on the grades given over the previous two or three years to a specific reference group – a single programme or a group of homogeneous programmes – from which a consistent grading pattern could be derived. These data, collected in a large number of institutions in Europe, have shown how national grading scales are actually being used. For example, teachers in French institutions are more consistently using the lower half of their scale, while their Italian counterparts are making more use of grades in the upper half of it. As for the subject area, the data from many Italian institutions showed that teachers in Engineering tend to mark lower than teachers in Humanities. Although these patterns had already been perceived by practitioners on an impressionistic basis, it is interesting to find that they are supported by statistical evidence. The grade distribution table developed for a specific reference group allows for a single grade currently obtained to be positioned in its own context, thus making it easier to understand the level of the student's performance and compare it with that of students with a similar position in other contexts.

As a second step in the implementation of the ECTS grading scale, the statistical distribution curve for each reference group was split into five segments (Top 10%, next 25%, next 30%, next 25%, lowest 10%) also called A, B, C, D, E, which could become a device for the direct translation of grades from a degree programme in a given country/institution into a similar one in another country/institution. For example, if, based on the statistical data, in a French degree programme the grade 14 was obtained by the top 10% of the students, the ECTS grade A could be added into a student's transcript alongside the grade 14. In this way the French grade 14 was understood as being one of the best grades obtained in that programme, comparable to the grade having a similar percentage in the same subject area in another country/institution, to which an A had also been attached – for example a 30 in an Italian institution.

This ECTS grading scale was based on the class percentile (similar, but not identical to the class rank) of a student in a given assessment, that is how he/she performed relative to other students in the same class (or in a significant group of students). The ECTS system classified students into broad groups and thus makes interpretation of ranking simpler. This grouping was the core of the ECTS grading system. The ECTS system initially divided students between pass and fail groups and then assessed the performance of these two groups separately. Those obtaining passing grades were divided into five subgroups: the best 10% are awarded an A grade, the next 25% a B grade, the following 30% a C, the following 25% a D and the final 10% an E. Those who had not achieved a performance sufficient to allow a passing grade were divided into two subgroups: FX (Fail – some more work required before credit can be awarded) and F (Fail – considerable further work is required). This distinction allowed differentiation between those students who had been assessed as almost passing and those who had clearly lacked the required knowledge and skills.

This system can be represented in a table, as follows:

Grade	%	Cumulative %	Definition
A	10	10	outstanding performance without errors
B	25	35	above the average standard but with minor errors
C	30	65	generally sound work with some errors
D	25	90	fair but with significant shortcomings
E	10	~100	performance meets the minimum criteria
FX			Fail – some more work required before the credit can be awarded
F			Fail – considerable further work is required

The use of words like "excellent" or "good" is not recommended as they do not fit with percentage based ranking of the ECTS Grade Transfer Scale."

Since the passing and failing groups were evaluated separately, indicating the percentage of students who failed a course unit/module was not obligatory, but transparency was increased if the percentage failure rate for each course graded was given. It was recommended that these rates be included in the Transcript of Records.

=== Conversion from local systems ===
The degree of differentiation shown in marks varies greatly from country to country and in many cases within a single country or institution. Expression in terms of ECTS grades is simple where the local marks are highly differentiated (i.e., the local grading scale has as much or more possible values than the ECTS scale). However, a sizeable number of instances exist where the local marks are less differentiated than those of the ECTS grading scale. These cases fall into two categories depending on whether the primary assessment data allows establishment of a ranking list or not.

- Where the original assessment can provide a ranking list, this ranking may be used directly to provide the appropriate ECTS grade. In this case, decisions must be made according to the distribution pattern of local grades trying to avoid injustice to students.
- Where a valid ranking cannot be obtained from the primary assessment data, only an ECTS pass or fail should be recorded. This applies to local systems where assessment is aimed at only pass/fail or threshold criteria. In these cases a pass should be indicated, for example by inserting the letter P or the word 'pass' in the column for ECTS grades. Such institutions which award only pass/fail or threshold criteria should indicate this very clearly in their Information Package/Course Catalogue as this fact may have recognition consequences for visiting students returning to an institution with a more differentiated grading system.

=== Sample size ===
Being a statistics-based system, the size of the cohort used as a basis for arriving at the ECTS grades is of great importance. When large numbers of students are being assessed for the same course unit/module at the same time, the situation is straightforward as the results of the assessment can be used to arrive directly at ranking and therefore to ECTS grades. A cohort of students where at least 30 individuals achieve passing grades is suggested as the minimum number necessary for meaningful ranking, although larger numbers are to be preferred.

A variety of strategies are open to institutions where cohorts are not of sufficient size. Grades obtained at different sessions or in different, but related modules at the same session may be compiled ways to arrive at suitably sized cohorts. For instance, experience shows that:

- the marks over several course units/modules of similar level often follow a similar distribution
- the distribution of marks over a five-year period is likely to produce a balanced result.

== Second version (2009) ==
In light of the experience with the ECTS 5-point grading scale in the past years, it can be said that the second step described above (the splitting into five segments, top 10%, next 25%, next 30%, next 25%, lowest 10%, also called A, B, C, D, E) proved to be far too ambitious and difficult to implement, especially in those national grading systems with only five or fewer passing grades, which could hardly fit into the predetermined percentage structure provided by the ECTS scale. In fact, the use of the ECTS scale by European institutions has been rather limited.

=== Simplified system: The ECTS Grading Table ===
In order to simplify the procedure, while continuing to pursue the objective of making European grades more transparent, the European Commission proposes using an "ECTS grading table", concentrating on the first step of the 5-point system. Thus institutions only need to provide a standard table from the statistical distribution of their own grades. Therefore, the ECTS grading scale based on a predetermined percentage structure is to be replaced by a simple statistical table completed for each degree programme or group of homogeneous programmes.

In other words, instead of trying to fit existing grading practices into a standard distribution scale, universities need only to determine the actual percentage of students that receive each 'local' grade.

This ECTS grading table can be produced for national grading scales of any size, from data concerning a given reference group which are easily available in institutional records. When included in the Transcripts of Records and Diploma Supplements of the students, the table will facilitate the interpretation of each grade awarded to them and will not require any further calculation.

To use the ECTS grading table the following steps should be taken:

1. Identify the reference group for which the grade distribution will be calculated (usually a degree programme, but in some cases a wider or different grouping of students such as a Faculty or sector—e.g. Humanities).
2. Collect all grades awarded over a period of (at least) two academic years for the reference group identified.
3. Calculate the grade distribution in terms of percentages for the reference group.
4. Include the grading percentage table of your degree programme in every Transcript of Records/Diploma Supplement.
5. For transfer, compare the percentage table of the other institution's degree programme with your own. On the basis of this comparison individual grades can be converted.

The first four steps in the procedure concern all programmes and are administrative tasks. The academic responsible for credit transfer may get involved in step 5 when general guidelines for the conversion of grades are being established.

The new ECTS grading table provides information to compare different grading systems and cultures. However, it still suffers from the drawback that it may not provide sufficient information to compare grades across national grading systems that have only five or fewer passing grades. For example, if the top passing grade in a national system is attained by 30% of students in a cohort, while in another national system the top grade is attained by 10% of students, there is not enough information to compare a top grade obtained in the first system against a top grade obtained in the second system.

== See also ==
- Grading in education
- Academic grading in Denmark
