= University College Capital =

- Professionshøjskolen UCC
- Type: University College, (Danish: professionshøjskoler)
- Established: 2008
- Rector: Laust Joen Jakobsen
- Location: Copenhagen, Bornholm, North Zealand, Denmark
- Campus: Copenhagen Bornholm North Zealand
- Website: http://www.ucc.dk

The University College UCC was an educational organization whose primary task was to offer professional bachelor's degrees and continuing education to the public and private sectors. It was based in the Copenhagen area, Hillerød and on Bornholm. In 2018, the University College merged with the University College Metropol and became the University College of Copenhagen (Københavns Professionshøjskole).

== Professionsbachelor Courses ==
Profession School UCC offers seven different professions bachelor courses:

- Teacher;
- Pedagogue;
- Nurses;
- Physiotherapist;
- Relaxation Pedagogue;
- Textile retailer;
- Sign Language and MHS-interpreter.

== Training ==
Profession School UCC offered courses, diploma courses and completion of further training courses in the educational and health professional field and in the leadership and guidance.
