= University College of Northern Denmark =

Danish university network

- Professionshøjskolen University College Nordjylland
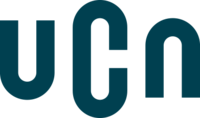
- Type: University College, (Danish: professionshøjskoler)
- Established: 3 July 2007; 18 years ago
- Rector: Kristina Kristoffersen
- Administrative staff: 870
- Students: 8,500
- Location: Aalborg; Hjørring; Thisted
- Website: ucn.dk

University College of Northern Denmark (Danish: Professionshøjskolen University College Nordjylland; or UCN) is a university college based in the North Jutland Region of Denmark with campuses in Aalborg, Frederikshavn, Hjørring, and Thisted. The school was founded in 2007, alongside other university colleges in Denmark, through an act of parliament which merged several existing colleges.

As of October 2025, UCN is on of six university colleges in Denmark. The university college employs about 870 members of staff and approximately 8,500 students are enrolled. UCN offers 47 programs at vocational training, associate degree (erhvervsakademiuddannelse), and bachelor's degree levels. The largest programs are in teaching, nursing, and economics.

== History ==
UCN was formally established on 3 July 2007 through the merger of CVU Nordjylland and Sundheds CVU Nordjylland. These institutions comprised several colleges, which were then overseen by UCN. These included four teacher training colleges: Hjørring Seminarium, Aalborg Seminarium, Socialpædagogisk Seminarium, Skipper Clement Seminariet; and four medical colleges: Sygepleje- og Radiografskolen i Aalborg, Vendsyssel Sygeplejeskole, Danmarks Jordemoderskole i Aalborg, and Fysioterapeut- og ergoterapeutskolen. Initially, UCN offered eight bachelor's degree programmes as well as a number of courses and continuing professional education courses in pedagogy and health.

On 1 January 2009, UCN merged with Nordjyllands Erhvervsakademi (The Business Academy of North Jutland), becoming the first university college in Denmark to offer business programs. On 1 July 2016, UCN took over the nursing, pedagogy and pedagogy assistant programmes from VIA University College.

== Exchange programs ==
UCN does not enrol international students in its degree programs, however, it offers semester-long exchange programmes within business, social education, health, and technology courses. The courses offered include: Architectural Technology and Construction Management, Computer Science, Export and Technology Management, International Hospitality Management, Marketing Management, Midwifery, Nursing, Occupational Therapy, Physiotherapy, Radiography, and Teacher Education.
