= West Jutland University College =

- Professionshøjskolen University College Vest
- Type: University College, (Danish: professionshøjskoler)
- Active: 2008; 18 years ago – 2011; 15 years ago
- Administrative staff: 350
- Students: 3,000
- Location: Esbjerg, Denmark; 55.483°N 8.485°E
- Campus: Esbjerg
- Website: http://www.ucvest.dk

West Jutland University College (Danish: Professionshøjskolen University College Vest) was one of eight new regional organizations of different study sites in Denmark (Danish: professionshøjskoler) offering bachelor courses of all kinds in the western part of Jutland.

Profession School University College West was established 1 January 2008 in Esbjerg. Formerly known institution CVU Vest. Western University College has 3,000 students and employs 350 staff.

In January 2011, the West Jutland University College merged with University College South and University College South Denmark with headquarters in Esbjerg.

School is divided into three faculties - an educational, a health professional and a community professional. The institution educates bachelors following professions:

- Occupational therapist;
- Physiotherapist;
- Midwife;
- Teacher;
- Public administration;
- Pedagogue;
- Social worker;
- Nurse.
