= Metropolitan University College =

University college in Copenhagen, Denmark

- Professionshøjskolen Metropol
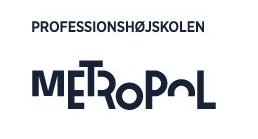
- Type: University College, (Danish: professionshøjskoler)
- Established: 2008; 18 years ago
- Endowment: 700 million. DKK.
- Rector: Stefan Hermann
- Administrative staff: 900
- Students: 9000
- Location: Copenhagen, Frederiksberg, Nørrebro, Aarhus, Rønne, Denmark; 55°41′52″N 12°33′29″E
- Campus: Copenhagen Frederiksberg Nørrebro Aarhus Rønne
- Website: http://www.phmetropol.dk

The Metropolitan University College (Danish: Professionshøjskolen Metropol), also referred to as Metropolitan UC or MUC, is a university college offering a range of bachelor's degree and academy profession degree programmes in Copenhagen, Denmark. All programs are taught in Danish except for a bachelor's degree in Global Nutrition and Health. A range of courses and modules in English are available to exchange students.

The Metropolitan UC is organized in two faculties with a total of nine departments. Its activities are spread out on a number of sites, in Nørrebro, Frederiksberg, and central Copenhagen. It has a total of approximately 9,000 students spread over 15 medium terms higher education. The University College translates annually for approximately DKK 700 million.

== History ==
Metropolitan University College was formed on 1 January 2008 through the merger of CVU Øresund, Nationalt Center for Erhvervspædagogik, Danmarks Forvaltningshøjskole, Den Sociale Højskole, Frederiksberg Seminarium and Suhrs into one organisation.

== Department and programmes ==
=== Faculty of Health and Technology ===
The Faculty of Health and Technology is organized in five departments and offers a total of 11 programmes:

==== Department of Nutrition and Midwifery ====
The department is located on Pustervig (No. 8( in central Copenhagen and on Sigurdsgade (No. 26, Building B/C) in Nørrebro. It offers three programmes:

- Bachelor's Degree in Midwifery
- Bachelor's Degree in Nutrition and health (Ernærings- og Sundhedsuddannelsen)
- Bachelor's Degree in Global Nutrition and Health

==== Department of Physical Therapy and Occupation Therapy ====
The department is situated in Sigurdsgade (No. 26) is Nørrebro. It offers two programmes:

- Occupation Therapy (ergoterapeutuddannelsen)
- Physical Therapy (fysioterapeutuddannelsen)

==== Department of Nursing ====
The Department of Nursing (Danish: Institut for Sygepleje) is located on Tagensvej (No. 86). It offers one programme:

- Bachelor's Degree in Nursing (Sygeplejerskeuddannelsen)

==== Department of Technology ====
The Department of Technology (Danish: Institut for Teknologi) is located on Sigurdsgade (No. 26). It offers four programmes:

- Bachelor's Degree in Biomedical Laboratory Sciences
- Bachelor's Degree in Chemical and Biotechnical Technology
- Bachelor's degree in Emergency and Risk Management
- Academy Profession in Chemical and Biotechnical Science
- Bachelor's Degree in Radiography (Radiografuddannelsen)

=== Faculty of Social Sciences and Education ===
==== Department of Education and Learning ====
The Department of Education is located on Nyelandsvej (No. 27–29). It offers three programmes:

- Bachelor's Degree in Education
- Meritlæreruddannelsen
- Bachelor's Degree in Natural and Cultural Heritage Management

==== Department of Social Work ====
The department is located on Kronprinsesse Sofies Vej (No. 35). It offers four programmes:

- Bachelor's Degree in Social Work (Socialrådgiveruddannelserne )
- Socialrådgiveruddannelserne på Bornholm
- Socialrådgiveruddannelserne i Hillerød
- Forsknings- og udviklingsaktiviteter inden

==== Institut for Pædagogisk Efter- og Videreuddannelse ====
The department is located at Tagensvej 18.

==== Department of Management and Administration ====
The department is located at Tagensvej 18 in Nørrebro. It offers the following programmes (as well as a number of shorter courses):

- Academy Profession Degree in Business and Public Administration
- Diplomuddannelsen i Offentlig Forvaltning og Administration
- Diplomuddannelsen i Skat
- Bachelor's degree in Public Administration (Akademiuddannelsen i Offentlig Forvaltning og Administration)
- Akademiuddannelsen til Tolk

== Locations ==
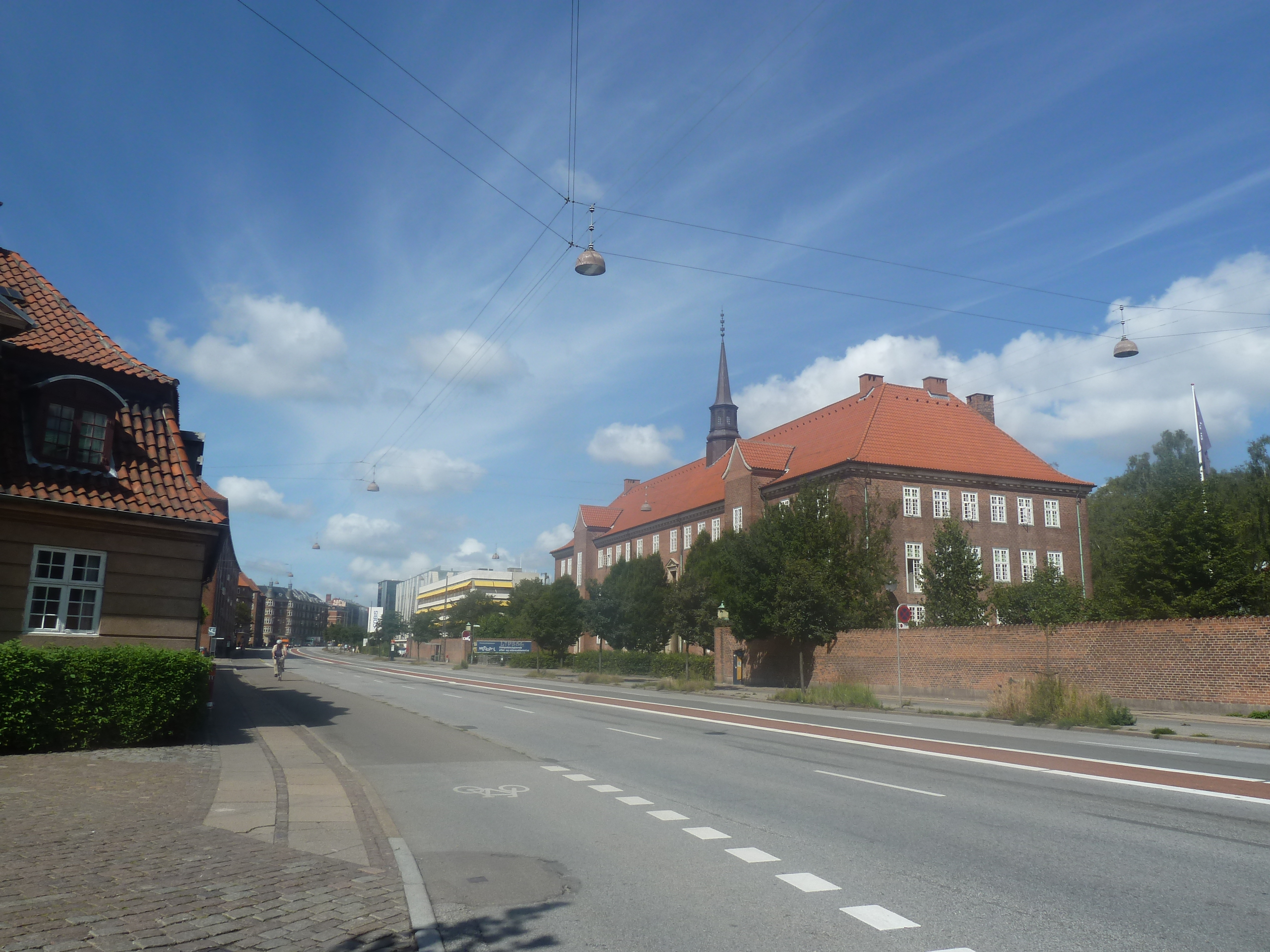
Tagensvej

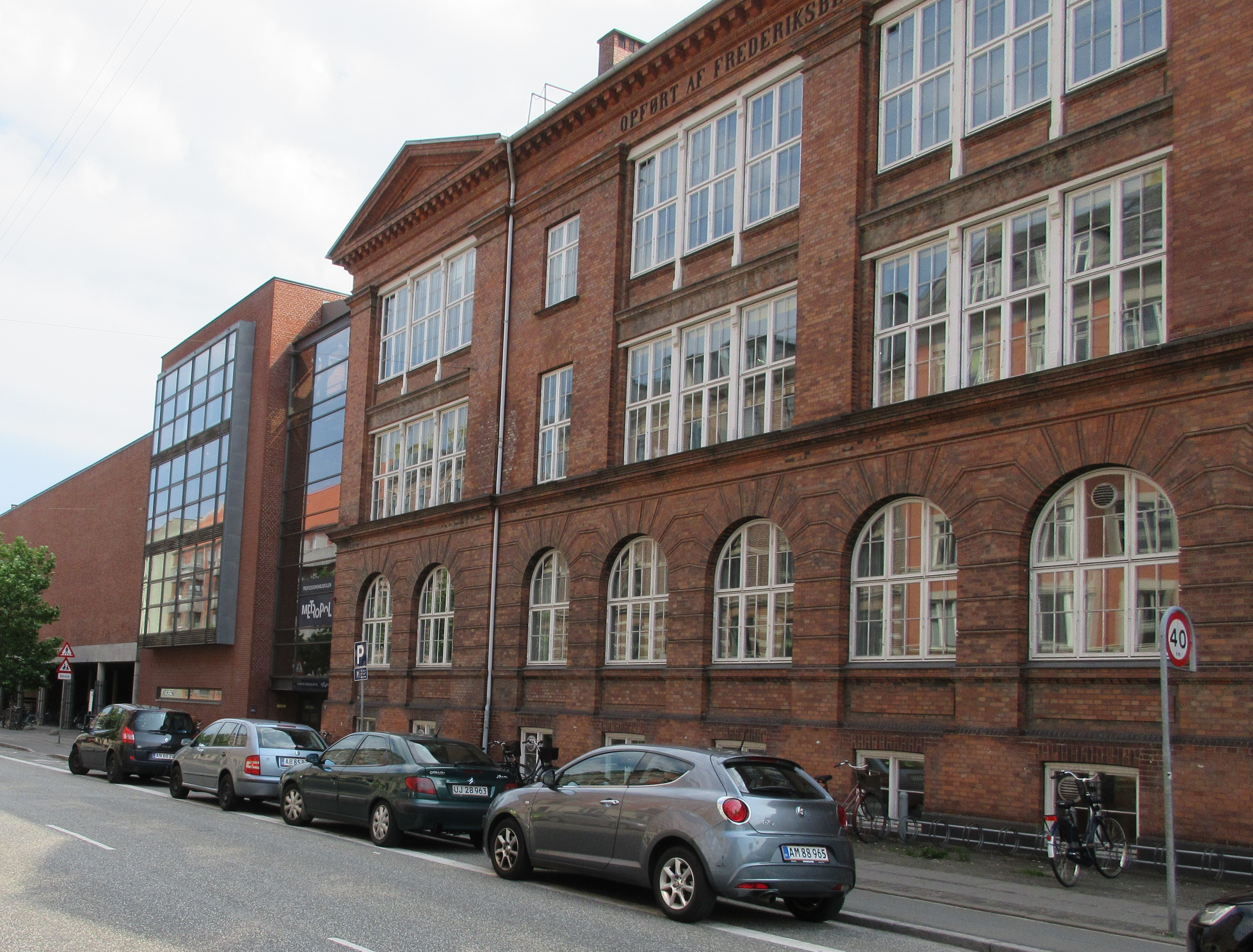
Metropolitan UC's building on Nyelandsvej

=== Tagensvej ===
The MuC's building ON Tagensvej (NO. 18-20) was originally built for the Danish Military Hospital in 1918–1928 to a design by Gunnar Laage. It contains the MUC's administration as well as the Department for Science and Nature.

=== Nyelandsvej ===
The MUC's building on Nyelandsvej (No. 27–) in Frederiksberg is the former home of Frederiksberg Seminarium. The building was expanded by Cubo Arkitekter in 1996 - 1997.
