= UCL University College =

University college in Denmark

- UCL Erhvervsakademi og Professionshøjskole
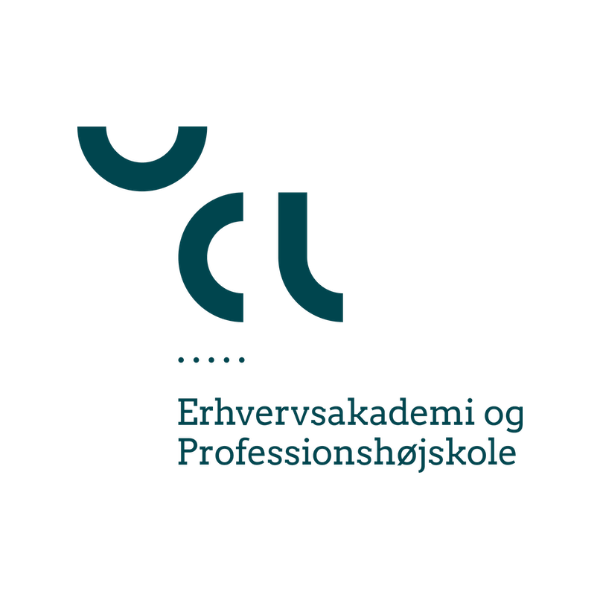
- Type: Public Academy
- Established: 2008; 18 years ago
- Affiliations: EUA
- Budget: 475 million DKK
- Rector: Jens Mejer Pedersen
- Administrative staff: 1000 (2019)
- Students: 10,000 (2019)
- Location: Southern Denmark; 55.3729°N 10.3997°E
- Campus: Vejle Odense Jelling Svendborg Fredericia
- Website: www.ucl.dk

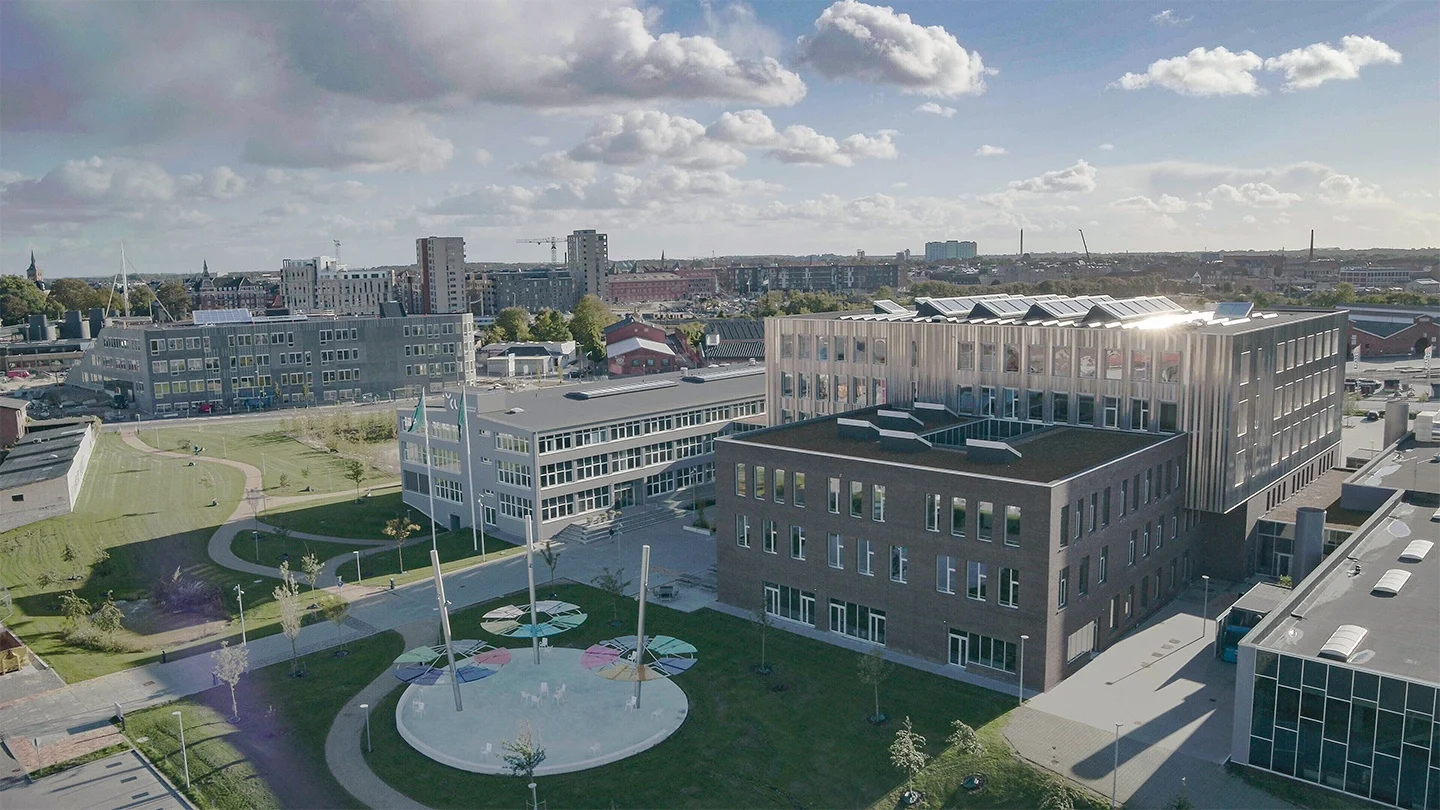
UCL University College, Seebladsgade, Odense Campus

UCL University College Lillebaelt (Danish: UCL Erhvervsakademi og Professionshøjskole) is one of the six regional university colleges in Denmark (Danish: professionshøjskoler) offering Bachelor courses in the southwest part of Denmark (Funen and Jutland).

It is the third-largest university college in Denmark.

In total, there are 10,000 registered students and 1,000 employees. Turnover is 475 million DKK annually.

== History ==
University College Lillebaelt was formed in 2008 by merging CVSU Fyn, CVU Fyn, CVU Jelling, Odense Socialpædagogiske Seminarium, Skårup Seminarium, Sygeplejeskolen i Vejle, Amtscentrene for Undervisning på Fyn og i Vejle and Den Sociale Højskole i Odense. The college was named after Little Belt (Danish: Lillebælt), which is the strait between the Danish island Funen and the Jutland Peninsula. On 1 August 2018 the Business Academy Lillebaelt and University College Lillebaelt were merged and are now known as UCL University College.

== Campuses ==
UCL University College has five campuses in the Southern Denmark Region. Currently, it has branches in Vejle, Odense, Jelling, Svendborg, and Fredericia. The headquarters is located in Odense.

In May 2008 UCL agreed with the University of Southern Denmark to take over the university's site at Niels Bohrs Allé in Odense in 2016 to consolidate six separate sites in Odense. The buildings had been used by the former Odense University College of Engineering and then the university's Faculty of Engineering.

== Education ==
Within 4 different faculties, UCL teaches roughly 40 academies and professional bachelor's programmes.

- Academy Profession programmes (2 years, taught in Danish/English);
- Professional Bachelor's programmes (3–4 years, taught in Danish/English);
- Top Up Bachelor's programmes (1½ years, taught in Danish/English);
- Full degree programmes (taught in English);
- Exchange programmes (taught in English).

== Faculties ==
- Faculty of Business Science;
- Faculty of Technology and Construction;
- Faculty of Education and Social Sciences;
- Faculty of Health Sciences.

== Professional Programmes ==
- Occupational therapist (Bachelor of Occupational Therapy) - (Odense);
- Physiotherapist (Bachelor of Physiotherapy) - (Odense);
- Teacher - (Bachelor of Education) - (Odense and Jelling);
- Pedagogue (Bachelor in Social Education) - (Odense, Jelling, Svendborg and Vejle);
- Therapist (Bachelor of Therapy) - (Odense and Jelling);
- Radiographer (Bachelor of Radiography) - (Odense);
- Social worker (Bachelor of Social Work) - (Odense);
- Nurse (Bachelor of Science in Nursing) - (Odense, Svendborg and Vejle).
