= University College Absalon =

University college in Denmark

- Professionshøjskolen Absalon
- Type: University College, (Danish: professionshøjskole)
- Established: 2007; 19 years ago
- Rector: Camilla Wang
- Students: 8640
- Location: Næstved, Roskilde, Slagelse, Vordingborg, Kalundborg, Nykøbing Falster, Holbæk, Denmark
- Website: phabsalon.dk/english/

University College Absalon (Danish: Professionshøjskolen Absalon) is one of eight regional organizations of different study sites in Denmark (Danish: professionshøjskoler) offering bachelor courses of all kinds in most of Zealand and some of the islands close to Zealand.

University College Absalon was established in 2007 and covers the region of Zealand. It offers 14 professional bachelor degree programmes, two of which are taught in English. Several international modules are offered each semester at different campuses. The degrees offered in English are a Bachelor of Engineering in biotechnology and an International Honour's degree in teaching. The college changed name in 2017 from University College Zealand.

The institution can be found on Facebook and Instagram.

== Programmes ==
=== Campus Holbæk ===
- Nursing

=== Campus Kalundborg ===
- Engineering in biotechnology (in English and Danish)
- Biomedical laboratory science
- Mechanical engineering

=== Campus Nykøbing F ===
- Nursing
- Social education
- Social work

=== Campus Næstved ===
- Biomedical laboratory science
- Nursing
- Occupational therapy
- Physiotherapy
- Public administration
- Radiography
- Healthcare administration

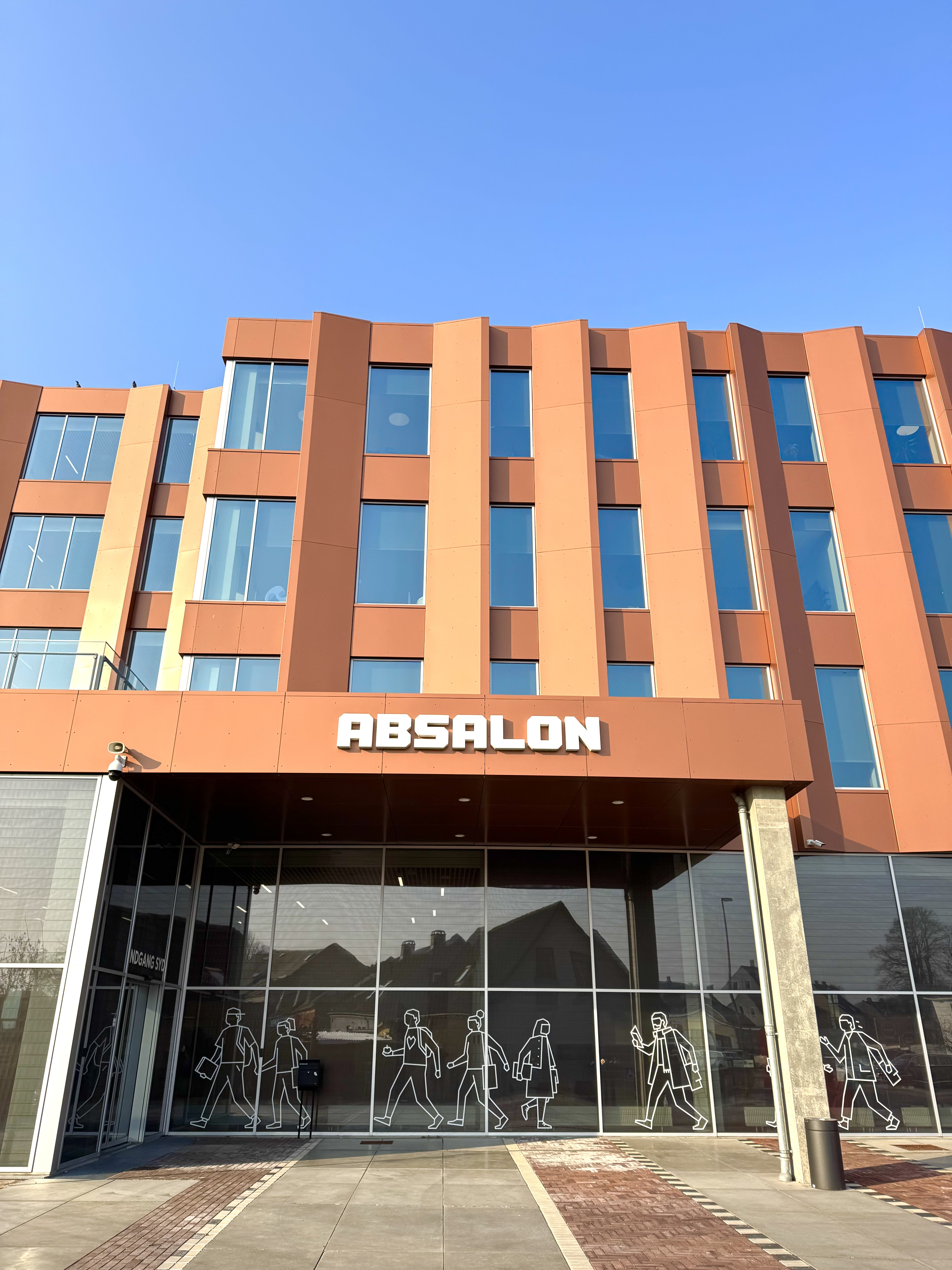
Absalon, Campus Slagelse

=== Campus Roskilde ===
- Education
- Leisure management
- Nursing
- Physiotherapy
- Social education
- Social work

=== Campus Slagelse ===
- Nursing
- Social education
- Midwifery
- Nutrition and health

=== Campus Vordingborg ===
- International Honours degree in teaching (in English)
- Social education

== English language programmes ==
=== Bachelor of Engineering in Biotechnology ===
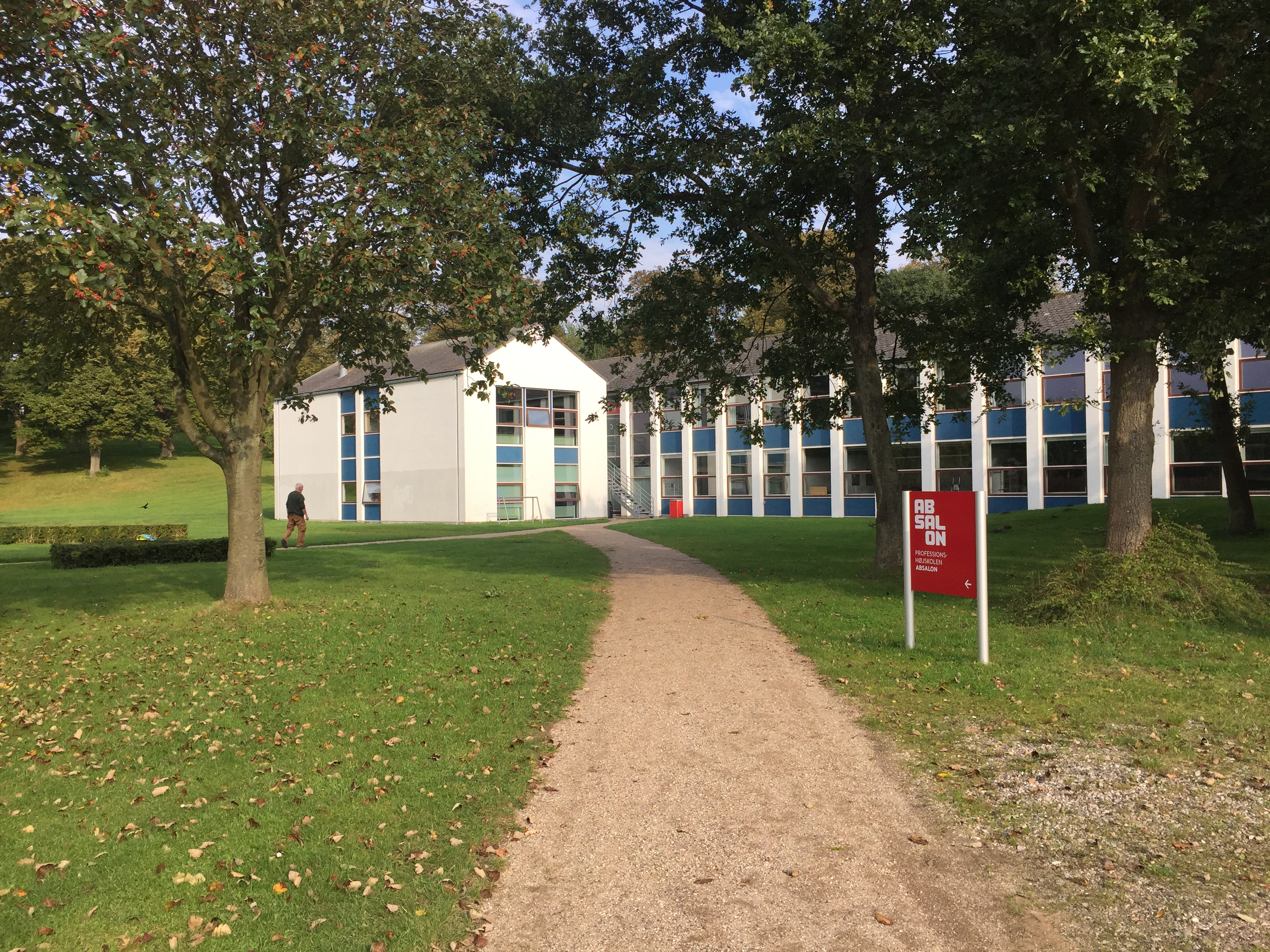
Kalundborg Campus

The Bachelor of Engineering in biotechnology programme started in 2017 in close co-operation with biotech companies operatinf in the Kalundborg area. The companies collaborate as part of the Kalundborg Eco-industrial Park which forms an industrial symbiosis network. Among the companies is the pharmaceutical company Novo Nordisk which has the world's largest insulin manufacturing site in Kalundborg.

The biotech programme combines biology, chemistry and the science of engineering and students learn hands-on with cases and projects in the international biotech companies that are located in Kalundborg. Students will have a paid internship in their last year as well as student job possibilities in the companies.

=== International Honours degree in teaching ===
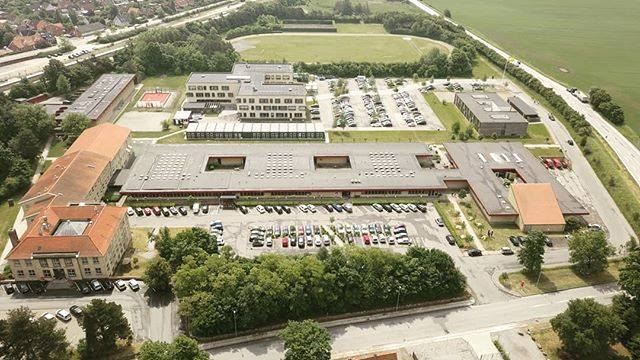
Vordingborg campus

The International Honours degree in teaching is located in the town of Vordingborg on the southwest coast of Zealand. The programme is focused on students who wish to become teachers with an international profile. It was developed due to the increased number of international schools worldwide creating a high demand for teachers with intercultural competences. As a response to this demand, University College Absalon developed an honours degree with an international focus.
