= University College South Denmark =

- University College Sydddanmark
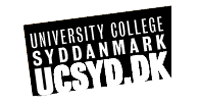
- Type: university college
- Established: 2011; 15 years ago
- Administrative staff: 700
- Students: 5900
- Location: Esbjerg, Kolding, Haderslev, Aabenraa, and Sønderborg, Denmark
- Campus: Kolding Haderslev Aabenraa Sønderborg Esbjerg
- Website: ucsyd.dk

University College South Denmark (Danish: University College Syddanmark) is a university college in the southern part of Denmark. It offers bachelor courses in various disciplines and has approximately 5,900 students and 700 employees.

== History ==
University College South Denmark was founded in 2011, when University College South and West Jutland University College were merged. University College South was formed on 1 January 2008, replacing the former CDE Sønderjylland and had offices in Esbjerg, Kolding, Haderslev, Aabenraa, and Sønderborg.

== Courses ==
The following courses can be taken at University College South Denmark:

- Public administration (Esbjerg);
- Biomedical science (Esbjerg);
- Ergotherapy (Esbjerg);
- Business language and IT-based marketing communication (Haderslev);
- Nutrition and Health (Haderslev);
- Physiotherapy (Esbjerg and Haderslev);
- Graphic communication (Haderslev);
- Midwifery (Esbjerg);
- Teaching (Esbjerg and Haderslev);
- Media and sonic communication - Sound design (Haderslev);
- Pedagogue (Esbjerg, Kolding and Aabenraa);
- Social worker (Esbjerg and Aabenraa);
- Nursing (Esbjerg and Sønderborg).

== Knowledge Center ==
- Knowledge of teaching profession;
- Knowledge of learning resources and evaluation;
- Knowledge management, organization and competence;
- Knowledge Center for Health Promotion;
- Knowledge of pedagogy and welfare innovation;
- Knowledge of special social pedagogy and social work;
- Knowledge of sound design and sound marketing.
