= Gymnasium (school) =

Type of school providing advanced secondary education in Europe

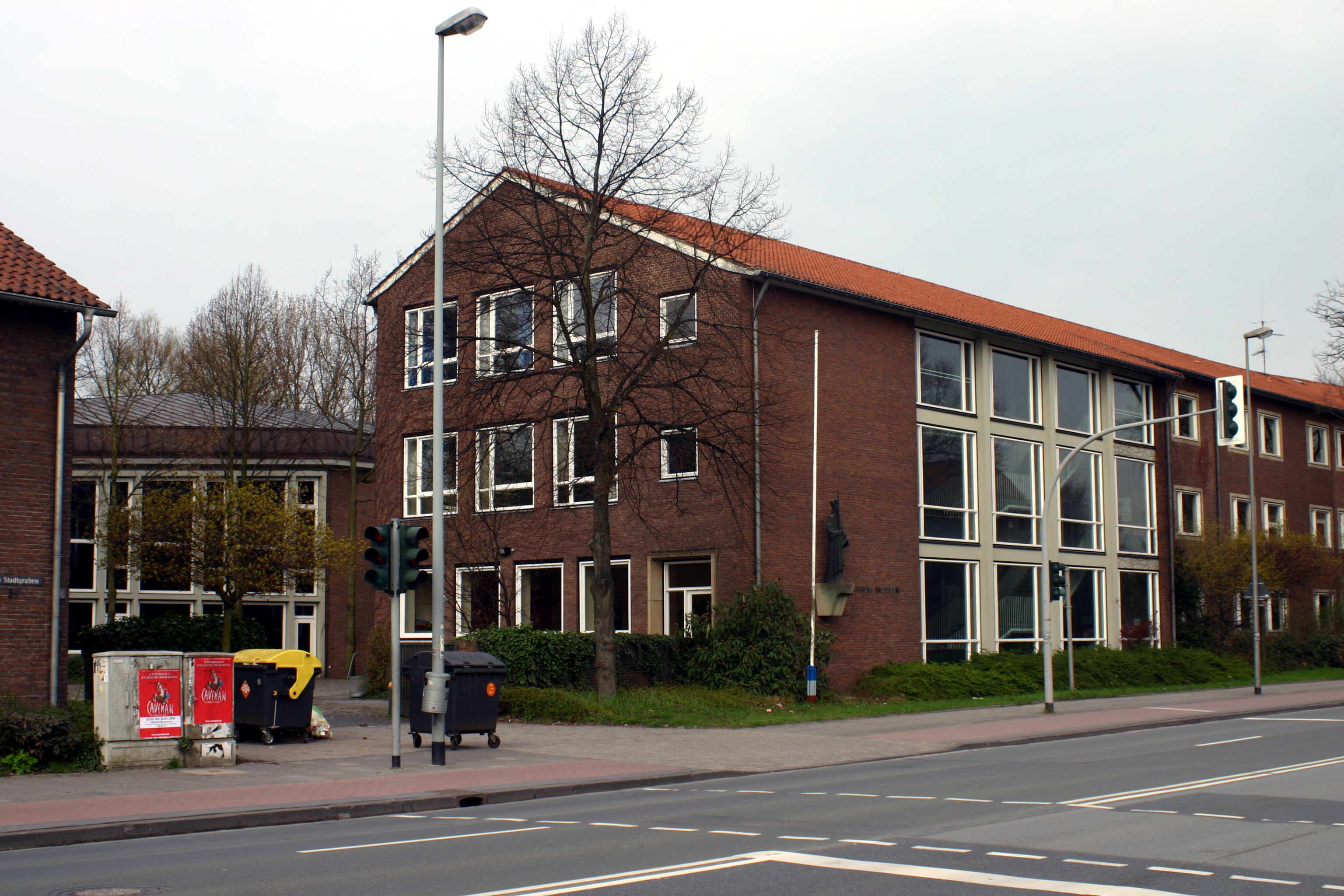
Gymnasium Paulinum in Münster, Germany, considered the oldest school in Germany, founded in AD 797

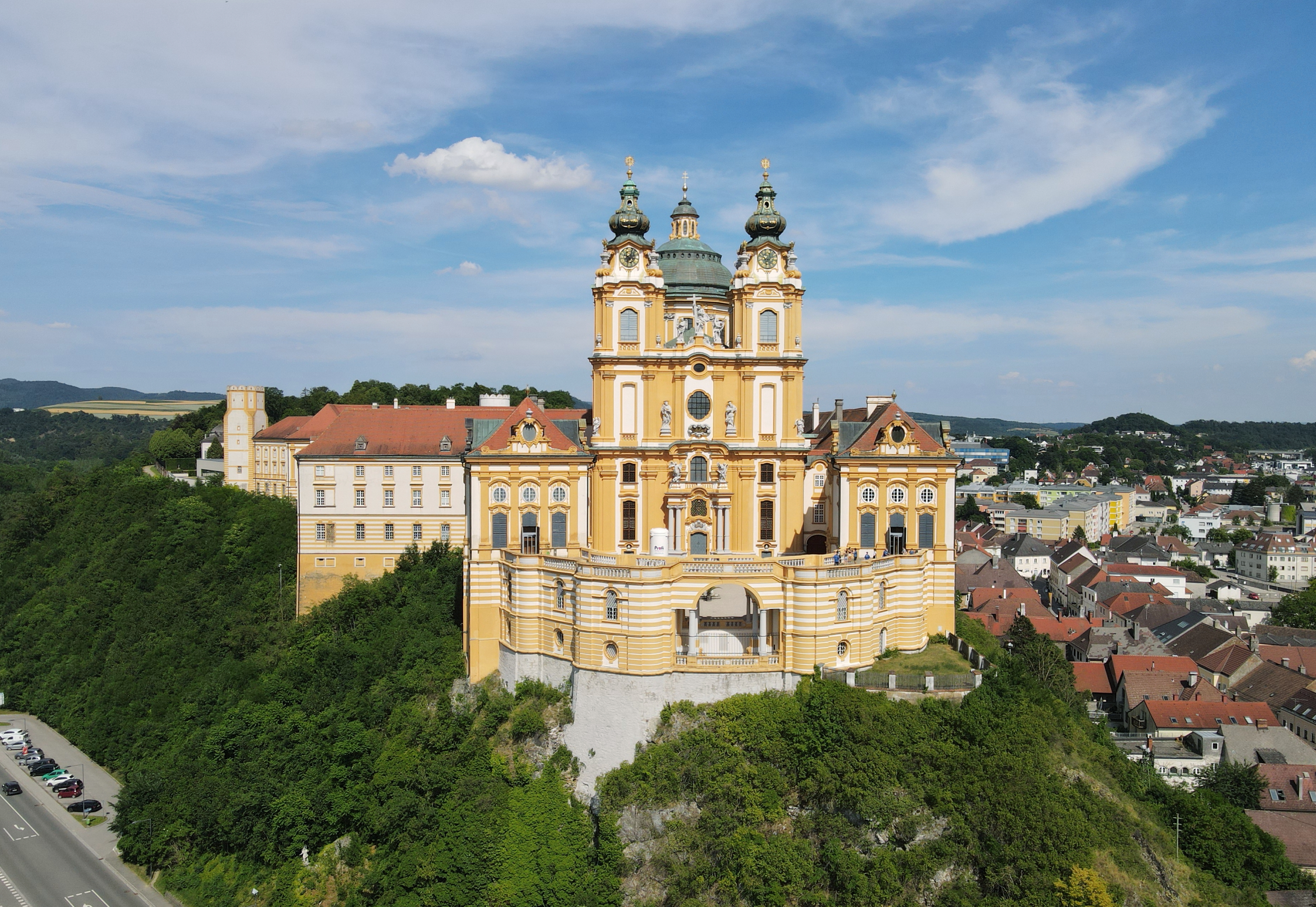
Stiftsgymnasium Melk, the oldest continuously operating school in Austria

Gymnasium (and variations of the word) is a term in various European languages for a secondary school (middle school and/or high school) that prepares students for higher education at a university. It is comparable to the US English term preparatory high school or the British term grammar school (although unlike its continental counterparts, the modern UK grammar school is a localized niche rather than the primary route to higher education). Before the 20th century, the gymnasium system was a widespread feature of educational systems throughout many European countries.

The word γυμνάσιον (gumnásion), from Greek γυμνός (gumnós) 'naked' or 'nude', was first used in Ancient Greece, in the sense of a place for both physical and intellectual education of young men. The latter meaning of a place of intellectual education persisted in many European languages (including Albanian, Bulgarian, Bosnian, Croatian, Czech, Dutch, Estonian, Greek, German, Hungarian, Macedonian, Polish, Russian, Scandinavian languages, Serbian, Slovak, Slovenian and Ukrainian), whereas in other languages, like English (gymnasium, gym) and Spanish (gimnasio), the former meaning of a place for physical education was retained.

== School structure ==
Because gymnasiums prepare students for university study, they are thus meant for the more academically minded students, who are sifted out between the ages of 10 and 13. In addition to the usual curriculum, students of a gymnasium often study Latin and Ancient Greek.

Some gymnasiums provide general education, while others have a specific focus. (This also differs from country to country.) The four traditional branches are:

- humanities (specializing in classical languages, such as Latin and Greek)
- modern languages (students are required to study at least three languages)
- mathematics and physical sciences
- economics and other social sciences (students are required to study economics, world history, social studies, or business informatics)

Curricula differ from school to school but generally include literature, mathematics, informatics, physics, chemistry, biology, geography, art (as well as crafts and design), music, history, philosophy, civics/citizenship, (Note: This subject has different names in the different states of Germany. See de:Gemeinschaftskunde.) social sciences, and several foreign languages.

Schools concentrate not only on academic subjects, but also on producing well-rounded individuals, so physical education and religion or ethics are compulsory, even in non-denominational schools which are prevalent. For example, the German constitution guarantees the separation of church and state, so although religion or ethics classes are compulsory, students may choose to study a specific religion or none at all.

Today, a number of other areas of specialization exist, such as gymnasiums specializing in economics, technology or domestic sciences. In some countries, there is a notion of progymnasium, which is equivalent to beginning classes of the full gymnasium, with the rights to continue education in a gymnasium. Here, the prefix pro- is equivalent to pre-, indicating that this curriculum precedes normal gymnasium studies.

== History ==
In the central European, Nordic, Benelux, and Baltic countries, this meaning for gymnasium (i.e., a secondary school preparing students for higher education at a university) has been the same at least since the Protestant Reformation in the 16th century. The term was derived from classical Greek γυμνάσιον (gymnasion), which was originally applied to an exercise area in ancient Athens. Here teachers gathered and gave instruction between the hours devoted to physical exercises and sports, and thus the term became associated with and came to mean an institution of learning.

This use of the term did not prevail among the Romans, but it was revived during the Renaissance in Italy, and from there it passed into the Netherlands and Germany during the 15th century. In 1538, at Strasbourg, Johannes Sturm founded the school that became the model of the modern German gymnasium. In 1812, a Prussian regulation ordered all schools with the right to send their students to the university to bear the name Gymnasium. By the 20th century, this practice was followed in almost the entire Austrian-Hungarian, German, and Russian Empires. In the modern era, many countries that have gymnasiums were once part of these three empires.

== By country ==
=== Albania ===
In Albania, a gymnasium (Albanian: Gjimnaz) education takes three years following a compulsory nine-year elementary education and ending with a final aptitude test called Albanian: Matura Shtetërore. The final test is standardized at the state level and serves as an entrance qualification for universities.

These can be either public (state-run, tuition-free) or private (fee-paying). The subjects taught are mathematics, Albanian language, one to three foreign languages, history, geography, computer science, the natural sciences (biology, chemistry, physics), history of art, music, philosophy, logic, physical education, and the social sciences (sociology, ethics, psychology, politics and economy).

The gymnasium is generally viewed as a destination for the best-performing students and as the type of school that serves primarily to prepare students for university. While in European countries a gymnasium tend to be the highest level of high school, in Albania a gymnasium is used to describe high school as a general category. Three quarters of Albanian high school students attend a gymnasium, while just a quarter attend vocational schools.

=== Austria ===
In Austria the Gymnasium has two stages, from the age of 11 to 14, and from 15 to 18, concluding with Matura. Historically, three types existed. The Humanistisches Gymnasium focuses on Ancient Greek and Latin. The Neusprachliches Gymnasium puts its focus on actively spoken languages. The usual combination is English, French, and Latin; sometimes French can be swapped with another foreign language (like Italian, Spanish or Russian). The Realgymnasium emphasizes the sciences. In the last few decades, more autonomy has been granted to schools, and various types have been developed, focusing on sports, music, or economics, for example.

=== Belarus ===
In Belarus, gymnasium is the highest variant of secondary education, which provides advanced knowledge in various subjects. The number of years of instruction at a gymnasium is 11. However, it is possible to cover all required credits in 11 years, by taking additional subjects each semester. In Belarus, gymnasium is generally viewed as a destination for the best-performing students and as the type of school that serves primarily to prepare students for university.

=== Czech Republic and Slovakia ===
In the Czech Republic and Slovakia, gymnázium (also spelled gymnasium) is a type of school that provides secondary education. Secondary schools, including gymnázium, lead to the maturita exam. There are different types of gymnázium distinguished by the length of study. In the Czech Republic there are eight-year, six-year, and four-year types, and in Slovakia there are eight-year and four-year types, of which the latter is more common. In both countries, there are also bilingual (Czech or Slovak with English, French, Spanish, Italian, German, or Russian; in Slovakia, bilingual gymnáziums are five-year) and private gymnáziums.

=== Germany ===
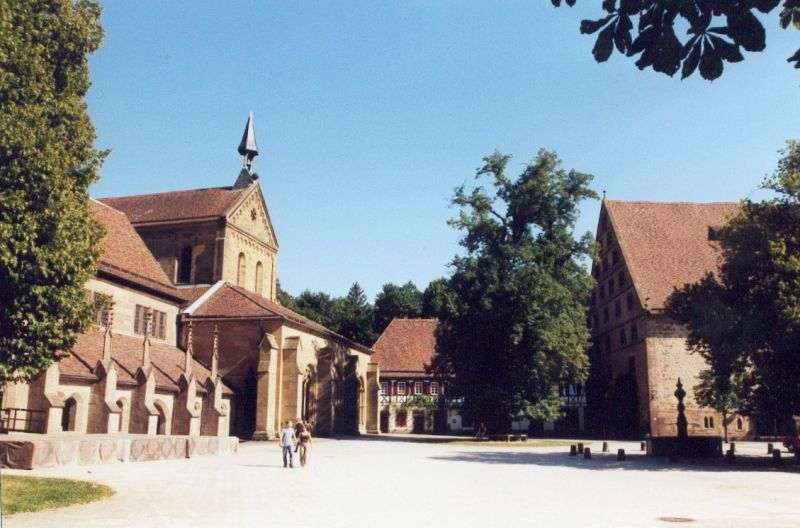
Evangelical Seminaries of Maulbronn and Blaubeuren – picture showing church and courtyard

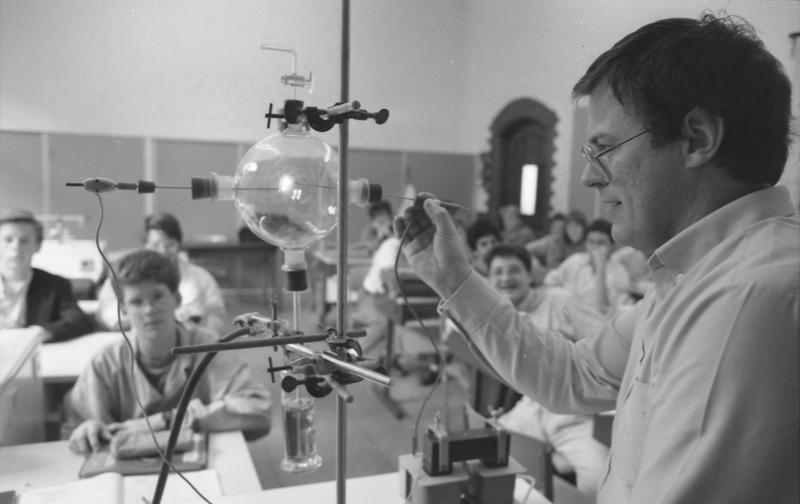
Chemistry lesson, Bonn, West Germany, 1988

German gymnasiums are selective schools. They offer academically talented students a quality education that is free in all state-run schools (and generally not above €50/month cost in Church-run schools, though there are some expensive private schools). Gymnasiums may expel students who academically under-perform their classmates or behave in a way that is seen as undesirable and unacceptable.

Historically, the German Gymnasium also included in its overall accelerated curriculum post-secondary education at college level, and the degree awarded by them substituted for the bachelor's degree (Baccalaureate) previously awarded by colleges and universities, leading universities in Germany to became exclusively graduate schools. In the United States, the German Gymnasium curriculum was used at a number of prestigious universities, such as the University of Michigan, as a model for their undergraduate college programs.

Pupils study subjects such as German, mathematics, physics, chemistry, geography, biology, arts, music, physical education, religion, history and civics/citizenship/social sciences and computer science. They are also required to study at least two foreign languages. The usual combinations are English and French or English and Latin, although many schools make it possible to combine English with another language, most often Spanish, Ancient Greek, or Russian. Religious education classes are a part of the curricula of all German schools, yet not compulsory; a student or their parents or guardians can conscientiously object to taking them, in which case the student (along with those whose religion is not being taught in the school) is taught ethics or philosophy. In state schools, a student who is not baptized into either the Catholic or Protestant faiths is allowed to choose which of these classes to take, if any. The only exception to this is in the state of Berlin, where the subject ethics is mandatory for all students and (Christian) religious studies can only be chosen additionally. A similar situation is found in Brandenburg, where the subject life skills, ethics, and religious education (Lebensgestaltung, Ethik, Religionskunde, LER) is the primary subject, but parents/guardians or students older than 13 can choose to replace it with (Christian) religious studies or take both. The intention behind LER is to provide students with an objective insight on questions of personal development and ethics, as well as on the major world religions.

For younger students, nearly the entire curriculum of a gymnasium is compulsory; in higher years, additional subjects are available and some of the hitherto compulsory subjects can be dropped, but the choice is not as wide as in other school systems, such as US high schools.

Although some specialist gymnasiums have English or French as the language of instruction, at most gymnasiums lessons (apart from foreign language courses) are conducted in Standard German.

The number of years of instruction at a gymnasium differs between the states. It varies between six and seven years in Berlin and Brandenburg (primary school is six years in both as opposed to four years in the rest of Germany) and eight to nine in Bavaria, Hesse and Baden-Württemberg among others. While in Saxony and Thuringia students have never been taught more than eight years in Gymnasium (by default), nearly all states now conduct the Abitur examinations, which complete the Gymnasium education, after 13 years of primary school and Gymnasium combined. In addition, some states offer a 12-year curriculum leading to the Abitur. These final examinations are now centrally drafted and controlled (Zentralabitur) in all German states except for Rhineland-Palatinate and provide a qualification to attend any German university.

=== Italy ===
In Italy originally the ginnasio indicated a type of five-year junior high school (age 11 to 16) and preparing to the three year Classical Lyceum (age 16 to 19), a high school focusing on classical studies and humanities. After the school reform that unified the junior high school system, the term ginnasio stayed to indicate the first two years of Liceo Classico, now five years long. An Italian high school student who enrolls in Liceo Classico follows this study path: Quarta Ginnasio (gymnasium fourth year, age 14), Quinta Ginnasio (gymnasium fifth year, age 15), Prima Liceo (lyceum first year, age 16), Seconda Liceo (lyceum second year, age 17) and Terza Liceo (lyceum third year, age 18). Some believe this still has some sense, since the two-year ginnasio has a differently oriented curriculum from the Liceo. Ginnasio students spend the majority of their schooling studying Greek and Latin grammar, laying the bases for the "higher" and more in depth set of studies of the Liceo, such as Greek and Latin literature and philosophy.

In July 1940 the fascist Minister of National Education Giuseppe Bottai got a bill of law approved that abolished the first three years of the gymnasium and instituted a unique path of studies for children aged from 12 to 14. The last two years of the gymnasium kept the previous denomination and the related scholastic curriculum for the following decades.

=== Netherlands ===
In the Netherlands, gymnasium is the highest variant of secondary education, offering the academically most promising youngsters (top 5%) a quality education that is in most cases free (and in other cases at low cost). It consists of six years, after eight years (including kindergarten) of primary school, in which pupils study the same subjects as their German counterparts, with the addition of compulsory Ancient Greek, Latin and Klassieke Culturele Vorming (Classical Cultural Education), history of the Ancient Greek and Roman culture and literature. Schools have some freedom in choosing their specific curriculum, with for example Spanish, Philosophy and Technasium, a very technical and highly demanding course, being available as final exams. Usually, schools will have all classes mandatory in switching combinations for the first three or so years (with the exception of Technasium which is a free choice from the second year onward), after which students will choose their subjects in the directions of Economics and Society, Culture and Society, Nature and Health, Nature and Technology or Technology. The equivalent without classical languages is called Atheneum, and gives access to the same university studies (although some extra classes are needed when starting a degree in classical languages or theology). All are government-funded. See Voorbereidend wetenschappelijk onderwijs (in English) for the full article on Dutch "preparatory scientific education".

=== Nordic and Baltic countries ===
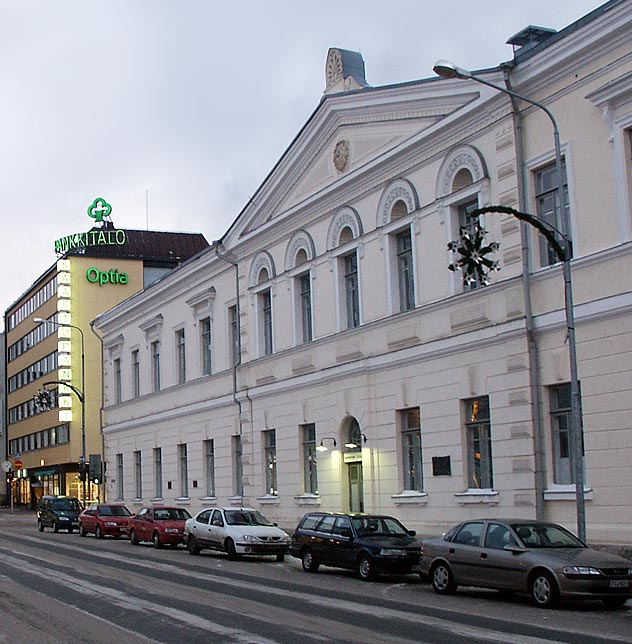
Kuopio Lyceum (Kuopion Lyseo), a gymnasium in Kuopio, Finland

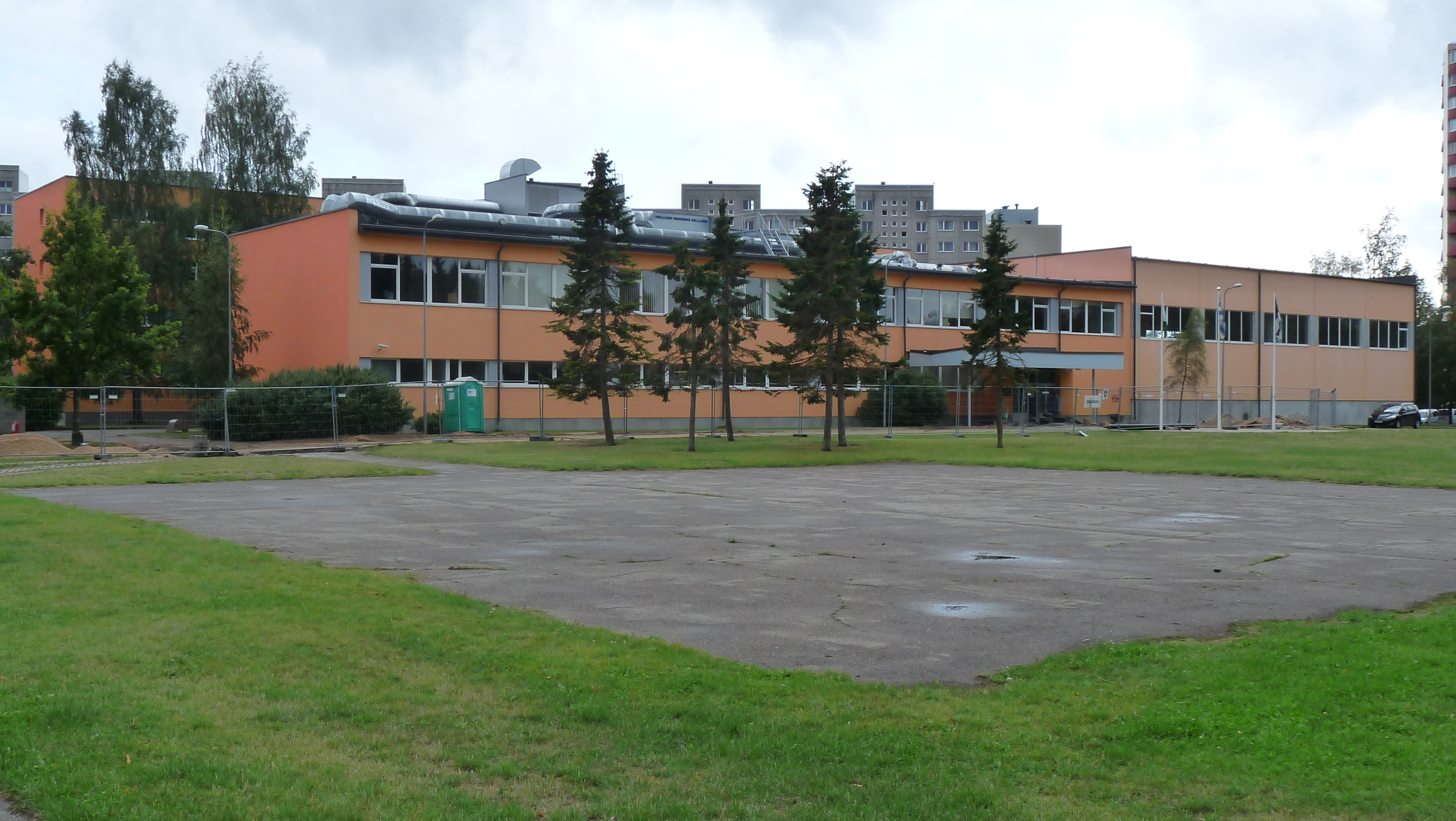
Tallinn Õismäe Gymnasium in Tallinn, Estonia

In Denmark, Estonia, the Faroe Islands, Finland, Greenland, Iceland, Latvia, Norway and Sweden, gymnasium consists of three years, usually starting at the year the students turn 16 years old after nine or ten years of primary school. In Lithuania, the gymnasium usually consists of four years of schooling starting at the age of 15–16, the last year roughly corresponding to the first year of college.

Most gymnasiums in the Nordic countries are free. Universal student grants are also available in certain countries for students over 18.

==== Denmark ====
In Denmark, there are four kinds of gymnasiums: STX (Regular Examination Programme), HHX (Higher Business Examination Programme), HTX (Higher Technical Examination Programme) and HF (Higher Preparatory Examination Programme). HF is only two years, instead of the three required for STX, HHX, and HTX. All different types of gymnasiums (except for HF) theoretically gives the same eligibility for university. However, because of the different subjects offered, students may be better qualified in an area of further study. E.g. HHX students have subjects that make them more eligible for studies such as business studies or economics at university, while HTX offer applied science and mathematics that benefit studies in Science or Engineering. There is also EUX, which takes four to five years and ends with both the HTX (or HHX for EUX-business) exam and status as a journeyman of a craft. Compared to the somewhat equivalent A-levels in the UK, Danish gymnasiums have more mandatory subjects. The subjects are divided into levels, where A-levels usually run through all three years, B-levels usually two years and C-levels one year (apart from PE which exists as a C-level lasting three years).

==== Sweden ====
In Sweden, there are two different kinds of branches of studies: the first branch focuses on giving a vocational education while the second branch focuses on giving preparation for higher education. While students from both branches can go on to study at a university, students of the vocational branch graduate with a degree within their attended program. There are 18 national programs, 12 vocational, and 6 preparatory.

==== Faroe Islands ====
In the Faroe Islands, there are also four kinds of gymnasiums, which are the equivalents of the Danish programmes: Studentaskúli (equivalent to STX), Handilsskúli (HHX), Tekniski skúli (HTX) and HF (HF). Studentaskúli and HF are usually located at the same institutions as can be seen in the name of the institute in Eysturoy: Studentaskúlin og HF-skeiðið í Eysturoy.

==== Greenland ====
In Greenland, there is a single kind of gymnasium, Ilinniarnertuunngorniarneq/Den gymnasiale Uddannelse, that replaced the earlier Greenlandic Secondary Education Programme (GU), the Greenland Higher Commercial Examination Programme (HHX) and the Greenland education to Higher Technical Examination Programme (HTX), which were based on the Danish system. This program allows a more flexible Greenland gymnasium, where students based on a common foundation course can choose between different fields of study that meet the individual student's abilities and interests. The course is offered in Aasiaat, Nuuk, Sisimiut, and Qaqortoq, with one in Ilulissat to be opened in 2015, latest in 2016 if approved by Inatsisartut.

==== Finland ====
In Finland, the admissions to gymnasiums are competitive, the accepted people comprising 51% of the age group. The gymnasiums concludes with the matriculation examination, an exam whose grades are the main criteria for university admissions.

=== Switzerland ===
In Switzerland, gymnasiums (Gymnasien, gymnases) are selective schools that provide a three- to six-year (depending on the canton) course of advanced secondary education intended to prepare students to attend university. They conclude with a nationally standardized exam, the maturité or Maturität, often shortened to "Matura or Matur", which if passed allows students to attend a Swiss university. The gymnasiums are operated by the cantons of Switzerland, and accordingly in many cantons they are called Kantonsschule (cantonal school). Several of them offer bilingual education in English.

=== Former Yugoslav countries ===
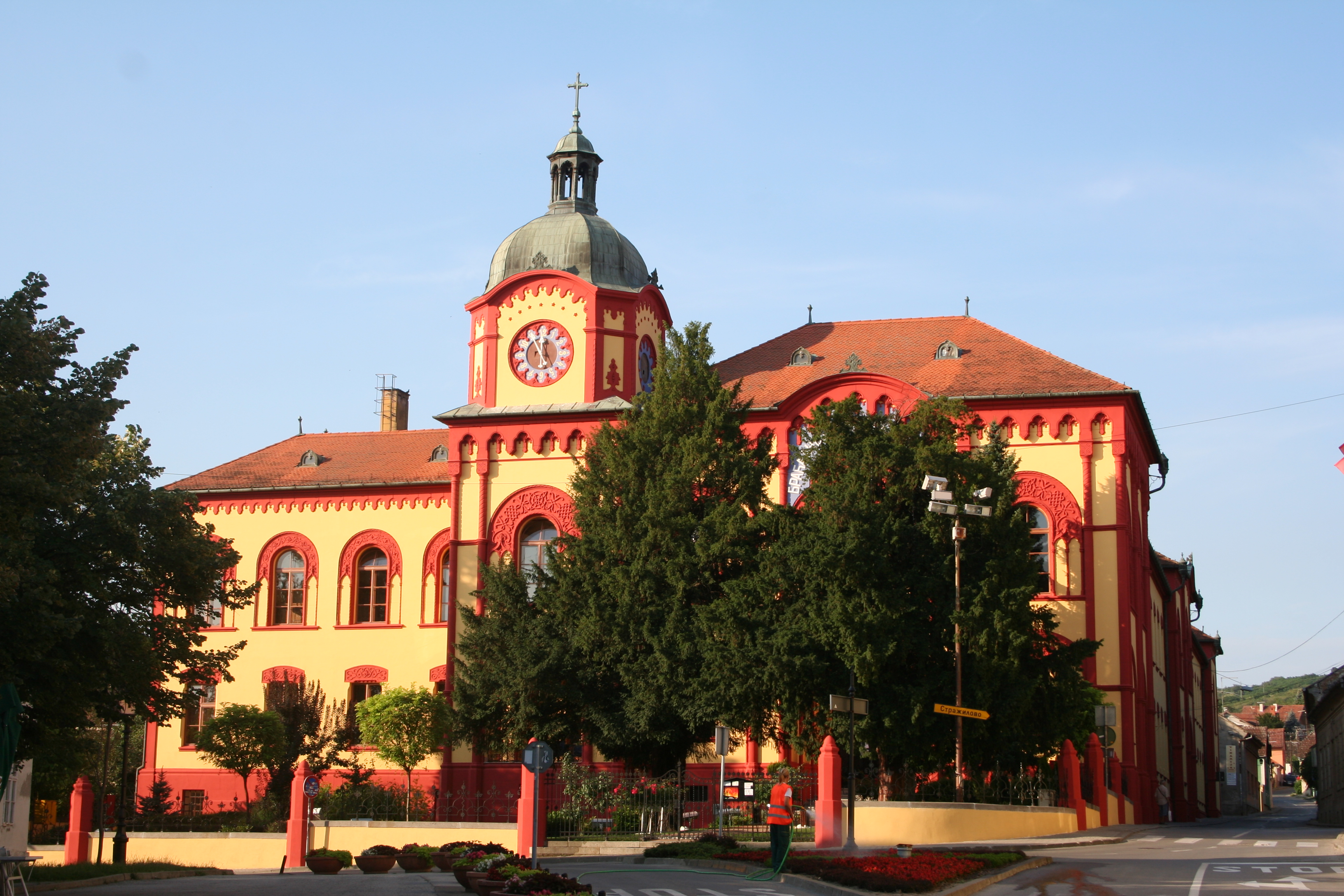
Karlovci Gymnasium in Sremski Karlovci, Serbia

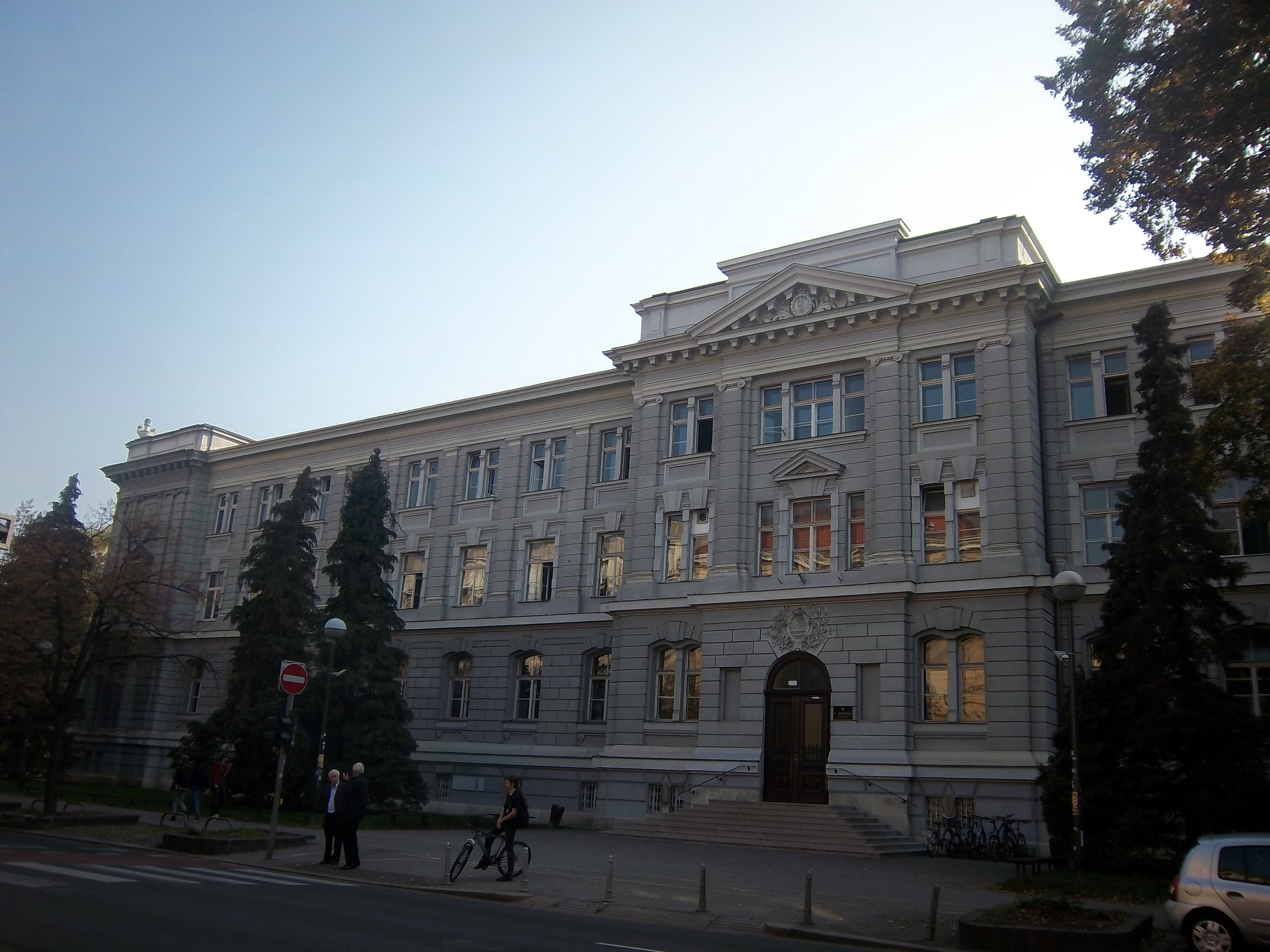
V Gymnasium in Zagreb, Croatia

In Bosnia and Herzegovina, Croatia, Montenegro, North Macedonia, Serbia, and Slovenia, a gymnasium education takes four years following a compulsory eight or nine-year elementary education and ending with a final aptitude test called Matura. In these countries, the final test is standardized at the state level and can serve as an entrance qualification for universities.

There are either public (state-run and tuition-free), religious (church-run with secular curriculum and tuition-free) or private (fee-paying) gymnasium schools in these countries.

The subjects taught are mathematics, the native language, one to three foreign languages, history, geography, informatics (computers), the natural sciences (biology, chemistry, physics), history of art, music, philosophy, logic, physical education, and the social sciences (sociology, ethics or religious education, psychology, politics, and economy). Religious studies are optional. In Bosnia and Herzegovina, Croatia, Montenegro, Serbia and North Macedonia, Latin is also a mandatory subject in all gymnasiums, just as Ancient Greek is, with Latin, in a certain type of gymnasiums called Classical gymnasiums (klasična gimnazija).

In all of the countries, the gymnasium (gimnazija/gjimnazi) is generally viewed as a destination for best-performing students and as the type of school that serves primarily to prepare students for university studies, while other students go to technical/vocational schools. Therefore, gymnasiums often base their admittance criteria on an entrance exam, elementary school grades, or a combination of the two.

== Countries with gymnasium systems ==
- Albania: Gjimnazi three years, after nine years (four years primary school and five years lower high school) of education, ends with Matura Shtetërore at the age of 18.
- Argentina: Colegio Nacional de Buenos Aires, 6 years; Rafael Hernández National College of La Plata, five years (formerly 6 years), after 7 years of primary school; and Gymnasium UNT eight years, ends at the age of 18.
- Austria: eight years, after four years of primary school; or four years, after primary school and four years of Hauptschule; ending in matura at the age 18.
- Belarus: 7 years, after four years of primary school.
- Belgium: 6 years, starting at age 11/13, after 6 years of primary school, ends at the age of 18 where students progress to a university.
- Bolivia: Deutsche Schule Mariscal Braun La Paz, 6 years, ends with Abitur.
- Bosnia and Herzegovina: four years, starting at age 14/15 after nine years in elementary school, ends with Matura.
- Brazil: Humboldt Schule of São Paulo is a German school in São Paulo. There are more gymnasiums in the country and some of them receive resources from the German government.
- Bulgaria: five years, after 7 years of primary school. Currently graduation after passing at least two Maturas.
- Colombia: Gimnasio Moderno (all-male, traditional Pre-K to 11th grade private school located in Bogotá, Colombia. Its founders were inspired by the original Greek to name the first "Gimnasio" in Colombia).
- Croatia: four years, starting at age 14/15 after eight years in elementary school, five different educational tracks: opća gimnazija (general education), klasična gimnazija (focused on Latin and Ancient Greek), jezična gimnazija (focused on modern languages), prirodoslovna gimnazija (focused on biology, chemistry, physics) and prirodoslovno-matematička gimnazija (focused on mathematics, physics and computer science), ends with Matura exam. Students of all tracks have compulsory classes of Latin and English as well as usually at least one additional foreign language (most commonly German, Italian, Spanish and French).
- Cyprus: three years, starting at age 12 and following 6 years of elementary school. Compulsory for all students. Followed by the non-mandatory Lyceum (ages 15 to 18) for students with academic aspirations or Secondary Technical and Vocational Lyceum TVE for students who prefer vocational training. After successfully completing the program, students of TVE are awarded a School Leaving Certificate, which is recognized as equivalent to a Lyceum School Leaving Certificate (three-grade Senior Secondary School).
- Czech Republic: four years, starting at age 15 or 16; 6 years, starting at age 13 or 14 (not usual); eight years, starting at age 11 or 12; all ending in matura.
- Denmark: three years, or four years for athletes who are part of the Team Danmark elite sports program, and musicians, artists and actors who have chosen MGK ("Musical Elementary Course"), BGK ("Visual Arts Elementary Course") or SGK ("Performing Arts Elementary Course"), usually starting after 10 or 11 years of primary school. This is more like a prep school or the first years of college than high school. Everyone is eligible to go to a US high school, but one needs to be deemed competent to get into a gymnasium. (For more information, see Gymnasium (Denmark).) Gymnasium is also available in an intensive 2-year program leading to the Højere Forberedelseseksamen ("Higher Preparatory Exam"), which doesn't give the same eligibility for university.
- Estonia: three years, after nine years of primary school.
- Faroe Islands: three years, usually starting after 9 or 10 years of primary school. The system is similar to the Danish system. A gymnasium-level education is also available in an intensive 2-year programme leading to Hægri fyrireikingarpróvtøka ("Higher Preparatory Exam").
- Finland: lukio (educational language is Finnish) or gymnasium (educational language is Swedish) takes two–five years (most students spend three years), after nine years of primary school (Finnish: peruskoulu, Swedish: grundskola); lukio starts usually in the autumn of the year when the student turns 16 and ends with the matriculation examination; lukio is compulsory since 2021 but students can choose between Lukio and Ammattikoulu(vocational school) and its entrance can be competitive, especially in larger cities.
- France: the French equivalent of a gymnasium is called a lycée (three years, after 5 years of primary school and 4 years of secondary school, age 15/18). The last year (called terminale) ends with passing the baccalauréat, an examination to enter university.
- Germany: formerly eight–nine years depending on the state—now being changed to eight years nationwide, starting at 5th (at age 11), Abitur in 12th or 13th grade; for more information, see Gymnasium (Germany).
- Greece: three years, starting at age 12 after six years of primary school. Compulsory for all children, it is followed by the non-mandatory General Lyceum (ages 15–18), or the Vocational Lyceum (EPAL). The EPAL School Leaving Certificate is recognized equally as a Senior Secondary School Leaving Certificate (high school).
- Hungary: four/six/eight years, starting after eight/six/four years of primary school, ends with Matura; see Education in Hungary
- Iceland: usually 3–4 years, starting at age 15 or 16 after 10 years of elementary school.
- Israel: five schools termed "gymnasium" located in Tel Aviv, Rishon LeZion, Jerusalem, and Haifa.
- Italy: ginnasio is the name of the two first years of Liceo Classico
- Kyrgyzstan: 7 years, after 5 years of primary school
- Latvia: three or six years, depending if you start from the 7th or 10th grade.
- Liechtenstein: ends with Matura.
- Lithuania: gimnazija—usually 4 years: 2 years of basic school after 4 years of basic school and 2 years of secondary school, sometimes eight years: 6 of basic school and 2 of secondary school, 12 years in rural areas or in art/music gymnasiums.
- Luxembourg: usually 7 years, starting at age 12–13 after six years of primary school.
- Montenegro: 4 years, starting at age 14/15 after nine years in elementary school, ends with Matura.
- Netherlands: six years, starting at age 11–13, after eight years of primary school. Prepares for admission to university. gymnasiums in the Netherlands have compulsory classes in Ancient Greek and/or Latin; the same high level secondary school without the classical languages is called Atheneum. They are both variants of VWO.
- Norway: the traditional but now discontinued gymnasium led to the completion of examen artium. This has now been succeeded by a 2-, 3-, or 4-year program (videregående skole), depending on course path taken, starting at the age of 15/16, culminating with an exam that qualifies for university matriculation (studiekompetanse).
- Poland: gimnazjum was the name of the 3-year Polish compulsory middle school, starting for pupils aged 12 or 13, following six years of primary school. Gimnazjum ended with a standardized test. Further education was encouraged but optional, consisting of either 3-year liceum, 4-year technikum, or 2 to three years of vocational school (potentially followed by a supplementary liceum or technikum). In 2017, Poland reverted to a compulsory 8-year primary school, optionally followed by a 4-year liceum, a 5-year technikum, or 2 to three years of vocational school.
- Romania: 4 years, grades 5 to 8, usually from age 11 to 14. Gymnasium (gimnaziul) follows primary school, which in Romania runs for five years: a preparatory year (clasa pregătitoare) at about age 6, then grades 1 to 4. At the end of the 8th grade, students sit the National Evaluation (Evaluarea Națională), which is mandatory. It covers Romanian, math and, for students who studied in a minority language, their mother tongue. The National Evaluation score counts toward admission to a high school (liceu), along with the high school admission process itself, if one is present at that high school. High school then runs for grades 9 to 12, or to 13 on the technological track. The first two years are the lower cycle and grades 11 and up are the upper cycle. Students choose among three pathways: theoretical, vocational and technological. Compulsory education now covers 14 years, from the middle kindergarten group (age 4 to 5) through grade 12.
- Russia
  - Imperial Russia: since 1726, eight years since 1871. Women's gymnasiums since 1862; 7 years plus an optional 8th for specialisation in pedagogy. Progymnasiums: equivalent to 4 first years of gymnasium.
  - Russian Federation: full 11 or 6–7 years after primary school. There are very few classical gymnasiums in modern Russia. The notable exception is the St Petersburg Classical Gymnasium where Latin, Ancient Greek, and mathematics are the three core subjects. In the majority of other cases, Russian gymnasiums are schools specialised in a certain subject (or several subjects) in the humanities (e.g. Chelyabinsk School No. 1).
- Serbia: 4 years, starting at age 14/15 after eight years in elementary/primary school. There are three most common types of gymnasiums: 1) general gymnasium (општа гимназија) which offers broad education in all sciences; 2) natural sciences (природно-математички смер); and 3) social studies (друштвено-језички смер), available all over Serbia, and a few specialised ones, e.g. mathematics (математичка гимназија)—only one in all of Serbia, in Belgrade; sports (спортска гиманзија)—just two in Serbia; language (филолошка гимназија)—a total of four in Serbia; and military gymnasium (војна гимназија)—only one in all of Serbia. In the end, all students take a final exam—a Matura. Completion of the Gymnasium is a prerequisite for enrollment into a university. English and another foreign language (from the selection of German, French, Russian (most common languages), Italian or Spanish (far less common) or Chinese and Japanese (only philological gymnasiums have these two) in addition to the mother tongue, and in case of minorities also Serbian) are compulsory throughout.
- Slovakia: 4 years starting at age 15/16 after completing nine years of elementary school (more common); eight years starting at age 11/12 after completing 5 years of elementary school; both end with Maturita.
- Slovenia: 4 years, starting at age 14/15; ends with Matura.
- South Africa: Paul Roos Gymnasium is a well-known gymnasium for boys in the town of Stellenbosch. The school is a boarding school, based on the classic British boarding schools; however, it was more influenced by the Protestant faith, hence the German Gymnasium. Foreign languages such as French, German, Mandarin, and Latin are studied; Afrikaans and English are compulsory. School in South Africa: 5 years, starting at age 13/14, at a secondary institution, after 7 years of primary school, ends with Matric.
- Sweden: Upper secondary school in Sweden lasts for three years (formerly four years on some programmes). "Gymnasium" is the word used to describe this stage of the education system in Sweden. The National Agency for Education has decided that gymnasium is equivalent to the international upper secondary school. The gymnasium is optional and follows after nine years in elementary school. However, the Swedish term högskola ("high school") may cause some confusion. In Swedish it is used almost synonymously with "university," with the only difference being that universities have the right to issue doctoral examinations. In the case of technical universities, these could also be called högskola even when they have right to issue doctoral examinations (e.g., Chalmers tekniska högskola, officially named a "Technical University" in English; Lunds tekniska högskola, Faculty of Engineering, Lund University; and Kungliga tekniska högskolan, Royal Institute of Technology"). A högskola is often located in cities with lower population, except for the technical ones that can be found also in the largest cities.
- Switzerland: usually 4 years after nine years of compulsory schooling (primary and secondary I); it is also possible to attend a so-called Langzeitgymnasium which lasts 6 years, following a six-year primary schooling; the Gymnasium ends with Matura at the age of 18/19.
- Ukraine: eight years, starting after four years of primary school.
- United Kingdom: historically, grammar schools have been the English equivalent of the gymnasium, selecting pupils on the basis of academic ability (usually through the 11+ entrance examination in year 6, at the age of 10 or 11) and educating them with the assumption that they would go on to study at a university; such schools were largely phased out from 1965 under the Wilson and Heath governments, and less than 5% of pupils now attend the remaining 146 grammar schools. The UK therefore no longer has a widespread equivalent of the gymnasium. The exception is Northern Ireland and some parts of England within the counties of Buckinghamshire, Lincolnshire, and Kent, which have retained the system. Grammar schools are also to be found in some London boroughs, North Yorkshire, Essex, Lancashire, Warwickshire, and Devon in varying degrees. Many private, fee-paying private schools, including all those commonly referred to as "public" schools, seek to fulfill a similar role to the state grammar school if the scholar has the ability (and thus to the gymnasium in other countries) and, most importantly, the money to attend them.
- United States
  - Public school: As school districts continue to experiment with educational styles, the magnet school has become a popular type of high school. Boston Latin School and Central High School in Philadelphia are the two oldest public schools in the country and the oldest magnet schools. As the concept has not become entrenched in the various American educational systems, due partly to the federal—rather than unitary—style of education in the United States, the term may vary among states.
  - Private school: The equivalent among private schools is the preparatory school.

== Final degree ==
Depending on country, the final degree (if any) is called abitur, artium, diploma, matura, maturita, or student and it usually opens the way to professional schools directly. However, these degrees are occasionally not fully accredited internationally, so students wanting to attend a foreign university often have to submit to further exams to be permitted access to them.

== Relationship with other education facilities ==
In countries like Austria, most university faculties accept only students from secondary schools that last four years (rather than three). This includes all Gymnasium students but only a part of vocational high schools, in effect making Gymnasium the preferred choice for all pupils aiming for university diplomas.

In Germany, other types of secondary school are called Realschule, Hauptschule and Gesamtschule. These are attended by about two thirds of the students and the first two are practically unknown in other parts of the world. A Gesamtschule largely corresponds to a British or American comprehensive school. However, it offers the same school-leaving certificates as the other three types—the Hauptschulabschluss (school-leaving certificate of a Hauptschule after 9th grade or in Berlin and North Rhine-Westphalia after 10th grade), the Realschulabschluss (also called Mittlere Reife, school-leaving certificate of a Realschule after 10th Grade) and Abitur (also called Hochschulreife, school-leaving certificate after 12th Grade). Students who graduate from Hauptschule or Realschule may continue their schooling at a vocational school until they have full job qualifications. It is also possible to get an erweiterter Realschulabschluss after 10th grade that allows the students to continue their education at the Oberstufe of a gymnasium and get an Abitur. There are two types of vocational school in Germany: the Berufsschule, a part-time vocational school and a part of Germany's dual education system, and the Berufsfachschule, a full-time vocational school outside the dual education system. Students who graduate from a vocational school and students who graduate with a good grade point average from a Realschule can continue their schooling at another type of German secondary school, the Fachoberschule, a vocational high school. The school leaving exam of this type of school, the Fachhochschulreife, enables the graduate to start studying at a Fachhochschule (polytechnic) and in Hesse also at a university within the state. Students who have graduated from vocational school and have been working in a job for at least three years can go to Berufsoberschule to get either a Fachabitur (meaning they may go to university, but they can only study the subjects belonging to the "branch" (economical, technical, social) they studied in at Berufschule) after one year, or the normal Abitur (after two years), which gives them complete access to universities.

== See also ==
- College-preparatory school
- Comparison of US and UK education systems
- Educational stage
- Gymnasium (ancient Greece)
- Lyceum
- Lyceum (classical)
- Realschule
