= Education in Denmark =

Education in Denmark is compulsory (Danish: undervisningspligt) for children below the age of 15 or 16, even though it is not compulsory to attend Folkeskole ("public school"). The school years up to the age of fifteen/sixteen are known as Folkeskole, since any education has to match the level offered there. About 82% of young people take further education in addition to this. Government-funded education is usually free of charge and open to all. Denmark has a tradition of private schools and about 15.6% of all children at basic school level attend private schools, which are supported by a voucher system.

The Education Index, published with the UN's Human Development Index in 2008, based on data from 2013, lists Denmark as 0.873, amongst the highest in the world, beneath Australia, Finland and New Zealand.

Literacy in Denmark is approximately 99% for both men and women.

== History ==
The Danish education system has its origin in the cathedral and monastery schools established by the Roman Catholic Church in the early Middle Ages, and seven of the schools established in the 12th and 13th centuries still exist today. After the Reformation, which was officially implemented in 1536, the schools were taken over by the Crown. Their main purpose was to prepare the students for theological studies by teaching them to read, write and speak Latin and Greek.

Popular elementary education was at that time still very primitive, but in 1721, 240 rytterskoler ("cavalry schools") were established throughout the kingdom. Moreover, the religious movement of Pietism, spreading in the 18th century, required some level of literacy, thereby promoting the need for public education. The philanthropic thoughts of such people as Rousseau also helped spur developments in education open to all children.

In 1809, the old Clergyman's School was transformed in accordance with the spirit of the time into a humanistic Civil Servant's School which was to "foster true humanity" through immersion in the ancient Greek and Latin cultures combined with some teaching of natural science and modern languages.

Throughout the 19th century (and even up until today), the Danish education system was especially influenced by the ideas of clergyman, politician and poet N. F. S. Grundtvig, who advocated inspiring methods of teaching and the foundation of folk high schools.

In 1871, the scientific and technical development of the 19th century led to a division of the secondary education into two lines: the languages and the mathematics-science line. This division was the backbone of the structure of the Gymnasium (i.e. academic general upper secondary education programme) until the year 2005.

In 1894, the Folkeskole ("public school", the government-funded primary education system) was formally established (until then, it had been known as Almueskolen ("common school")), and measures were taken to improve the education system to meet the requirements of industrial society.

In 1903, the 3-year course of the Gymnasium was directly connected the municipal school through the establishment of the mellemskole ('middle school', grades 6–9), which was later on replaced by the realskole. Previously, students wanting to go to the Gymnasium (and thereby obtain qualification for admission to university) had to take private tuition or similar means as the municipal schools were insufficient.

In 1975, the realskole was abandoned and the Folkeskole (primary education) transformed into an egalitarian system where pupils go to the same schools regardless of their academic merits.

== Compulsory education ==
The folkeskole (English: people's school) covers the entire period of compulsory education, from the age of 5 - 6 to 15 - 16, encompassing pre-school, primary and lower secondary education.

== Secondary education ==
Secondary education usually takes two to four years and is attended by students between the ages of 15 - 16 and 18 - 19. Secondary education is not compulsory, but usually free of charge, and students have a wide range of programmes to choose from. Some education programmes are academically oriented, the most common being the Gymnasium. Others are more practically oriented, training students for jobs as e.g. artisans or clerks through a combination of instruction in vocational schools and apprenticeship. In Denmark students have three attempts to finish their secondary education; from there on they are left on their own. If they wish to continue from here on, they are allowed to get an education but no longer with any economic support from the government.

== Post-secondary education ==
Higher education in Denmark can take place at a number of different institutions that offer educations of different types. Only universities offer education at the master level, while university colleges offer certain bachelor degrees, but may collaborate with a university to offer a master level degree (such as the MA in Journalism at Aarhus University being a collaboration with the Danish School of Media and Journalism. Bachelor degree are either academic bachelor degrees at universities or professional bachelor degrees at university colleges (Danish: professionsbacheloruddannelse), but universities may also offer professional bachelor degrees, and for instance, you can take the education to become a social worker at Aalborg University.

=== Business academies ===
Business academies (Danish: Erhvervsakademi) offer two-year academy profession programmes; some business academies also offer professional bachelor programmes, further adult education and diploma programmes.

=== Maritime educational institutions ===
The maritime education institutions offer study programmes for the Danish merchant fleet and the fishing industry.

=== University colleges ===
Danish university colleges (Danish: professionshøjskoler) offer profession specific tertiary education, also known as medium higher education (MVU) and diploma courses, but do not offer university education at postgraduate level.

=== Institutions in architecture and art ===
The institutions in architecture and art offer various degree programmes within the fine arts and applied arts.

=== Universities ===
The first university in Denmark, University of Copenhagen, was established in 1479. The second, Kiel University in Schleswig-Holstein, was established in 1665. When Schleswig-Holstein was conquered by German forces in 1864, the University of Copenhagen was once again the only university in the Kingdom of Denmark and remained so until 1928 when the Aarhus University was founded. Since then, more universities have been established, and Denmark now has eight universities.

Higher education in Denmark is free for students from the European Union and Switzerland. Many programmes are taught in English, including Bachelor's, Master's, PhD, exchange, and summer school programmes.

== Tuition and financial aid system ==
Almost all educational institutes in Denmark are free. This tuition-fee-less system applies to all students who:

- have been born in Denmark (including the Faroe Islands and Greenland); or
- hold a permanent resident visa; or
- Permanent residence permit (permanent opholdstilladelse)
- Temporary residence permit that can be upgraded to a permanent one (midlertidig opholdstilladelse mmf varigt ophold)
- Residence permit as the accompanying child of a non-EU/EEA parent holding a residence permit based on employment (§9a and §9m of the Danish Aliens Act - text in Danish)
- hold a humanitarian visa; or
- are from a country in the Nordic Council; or
- are from a country in the European Economic Area or European Union.

Not only are students charged no tuition fees, but all Danish citizens over 18 (and many others meeting certain criteria) are offered monthly financial aid, known as "SU" (Statens Uddannelsesstøtte, meaning State Educational Support), amounting for each student to about DKK 950 monthly if the student lives with their parents or guardians, and they have high incomes, and about DKK 5,486 monthly if the student lives away from their parents or guardians. Students can supplement the SU with low-interest government loans amounting to DKK 2,807 per month, which must be paid back upon the completion of their education.

== Academic freedom ==
Wright and Ørberg (2008) came to a critical conclusion on the Danish system of higher education: "The Danish model combines the worst of both the free trade and the modernising state models of autonomy: universities, their leaders and academics are given freedom in the sense of individual responsibility for their own economic survival, whilst the sector comes under heavy political control. This is called "setting universities free"." In a 2017 comparative study on academic freedom in the universities of 28 European Union members, Denmark ranks only 24th. In all categories (academic freedom in legislation; institutional autonomy in legislation; self-governance in legislation; job security; constitution and international agreements), Denmark ranked below the EU average. The authors of the study argue that the restrictions on academic freedom in Denmark would, in most other EU states, be considered draconian.

== See also ==
- Danish Folkeskole Education
- Efterskole
- List of schools in Denmark
- List of universities in Denmark
- Open access in Denmark
