= Higher Technical Examination Programme =

Upper secondary education programme

In Denmark, the Higher Technical Examination Programme (HTX, in Danish: Højere Teknisk Eksamen) is a 3-year vocationally oriented general upper secondary programme which builds on the 10th-11th form of the Folkeskole education system. It leads to the higher technical examination, the HTX-examination, which permits a student to qualify for admission to higher education, subject to the special entrance regulations that apply to the individual course. The programme gives special attention to scientific, technical and communicative subjects. HTX graduates may study at any Danish technical, scientific or traditional university as well as technical and technological academy (akademi) or college (professionshøjskole).

== HTX-programme ==
The aim of the programme is to give the students a general and technical upper secondary education, which through theoretical and workshop-related teaching, qualifies the students for admission to higher education. The programme furthermore provides a partial basis for occupational employment and qualifies the student for a reduction of the schooling period in a vocational education and training programme.

The HTX-programme is a 3-year programme. The introductory 6-month semester details the aims of the secondary school period of the vocational education and training programmes offered by the college.

The programme caters to the 16 to 19-year-old bracket and is divided into years with a certain number of obligatory and optional subjects of both a general and a vocational nature. Students may have the same teacher for different subjects throughout the programme.

The programme builds on the 9th form of the Folkeskole education system or a corresponding qualification and is of 3 years' duration. The school organises the teaching so that the aims of individual subjects are met, before the students are to be examined in the subject. Each student completes their own final project.

=== Admission requirements ===
The 3-year HTX-programme builds on to the 10th year of the Folkeskole education system or similar education.

All pupils that have received the relevant education and passed the prescribed examination(s) can continue in an upper secondary programme of more or less their own choice.

Access, however, is not automatically available to the general upper secondary programmes. If a school finds that the pupil and their parents are not taking the education and guidance provided seriously, and/or that there is a risk that the pupil will not be able to meet the requirements of the general upper secondary programmes, the pupil may be recommended to sit for an admission test to one of the general upper secondary programmes.

=== History ===
The HTX Programme was established in 1982 by the Ministry of Education as an experiment to oblige the rising demand for more technical and scientific educated labour in Denmark at the time. Before 1982 there were only three ways to get a university degree in the Danish education system; through the ‘Gymnasium (STX)’, ‘Higher Preparatory Examination (HF)’ or ‘Higher Commercial Examination Programme (HHX)’. Of those, only the Gymnasium could lead directly to a technical university education, but it wasn't a wholesome way since there were a lot of mandatory subjects which was of no use at a technical university education (classical studies [Danish: oldtidskundskab], religious studies, history, and physical education). None of those oriented in special only to the scientific, technical and communicative subjects, which in a more and more globalised Denmark began to matter a great deal. The labour market was experiencing downturns due to great changes in the Danish business sector, where Denmark's role in the world was shifting from a productive industrial country (like China), to a more service-industrial country, with research and "production of knowledge" becoming the most vital markets. To be compatible with the rest of the world, more engineers and scientists needed to be educated.

This was where the Higher Technical Examination Programme entered the picture. HTX was then only offered as a 2½-year programme, which only gave admission to certain technical educations, like bachelor engineer (Danish: teknikumingeniør) and civil engineer (Danish: civilingeniør) in construction. As an experimental programme, the HTX was using the most modern method of teaching, and a lot of interdisciplinary group- and project-work to imitate situations that students would encounter in the real world – something that wasn't being done a great deal in gymnasia. The programme also quickly adapted computer technology for use in the education like mathematics. The main subjects were of course chemistry, biology, physics and mathematics, and the education was on the same level as the gymnasium, without the unnecessary subjects. The programme was a great success. As the experimental phase was being closed in 1988, the HTX programme was to become a fully integrated part of the Danish education system. It began to spread throughout the Danish education system, and was offered at the most technically oriented vocational secondary schools (Danish: tekniske erhvervsskoler) before long. The programme though had image problems as it was somehow regarded a "geek-school" because of the great deal of technical and scientific subjects that didn't attract female attention, which caused the HTX programme to be very male-dominated in the first years.

On 1 January 1991, the subjects were divided into A, B and C levels, which for that reason removed the last thing that kept the HTX programme from being a complete academically oriented upper secondary education equal to the gymnasium. The HTX programme was now also extended to 3 full years of studying, with a final exam in the A-level subjects at the last year. From now on, the HTX programme could lead to any university education, but still with focus on the technical and scientific subjects, and less on the humanist subjects, though it was also possible to take optional subjects (like design and psychology) that may give access to some humanist university educations. Some new unique subjects to be found only at the HTX programme, like the "technique-subject" (Danish: teknikfag), technology and history of technology were introduced. At the same time, the mandatory level of chemistry, physics and mathematics was set a level higher (B-level) than at the gymnasium (C-level), which meant that an HTX graduate, unlike an STX graduate, automatically had admission to any technical university education.

In 2005, there was a gymnasium reform. The gymnasium, the HHX programme and the HTX programme were now fully equal, which means that they have the same optional subjects, and they have adopted some of each other's strengths to make a fully integrated academically oriented upper secondary education. For example, the 3 programmes have very similar 6-month introduction semesters (grundforløb), which make it easy to shift between the 3 programmes to find the most suitable for one. Furthermore, the subject "history of technology" was made obligatory at C-level.

In 2007 the Ministry of Education revised the "Gymnasium-reform", and introduced biotechnology as a new optional subject, which until 2009 is offered only as an experiment.

=== Specialization, subjects and levels ===
The HTX programme is based on technical and scientific subjects at the highest mandatory level offered in Denmark. Furthermore, it is as well based on a wide range of optional subjects similar to those found in the Gymnasium or at the HHX programme. Some of the optional subjects are business, economics, work environment, history of technology, international technology and culture, information technology, material technology, design, statistics, quality control, etc.

The subjects can be taken at 3 levels: A, B and C, with A as the highest level and usually a studying time of 3 years. The students choose at least three A-level, three B-level, and one C-level subjects to meet the requirements for a full HTX-exam diploma.

The new students who are admitted, begins at the Programme in August every year, in the so-called "1st g" (Danish: første g). The first half year is spent at an "introductory semester" (grundforløb) where the students are randomly selected into classes, with an emphasis on the students' selected line of study. Here they receive education in Danish, English, mathematics, physics, chemistry, technology and information technology to ensure that the students are all equally prepared. The biggest differences between the new students are in mathematics, where basic needs are taught (like solving equations and algebra). The introductory course is finished with an obligatory "portfolio examination", whose purpose is to make clear (to both the teachers and the student) how and what the student has learned over the past half year of introduction to the HTX programme. The duration of the exam is 20 minutes.

Before Christmas, the students must have chosen their desired 'line of study' (studielinje). A line of study is a compilation of subjects at different levels, all of which adhere to the minimal requirements of the HTX-exam. This is the final, binding choice, which forms the programme with some differences depending on study specialization. A line of study consist of 2 subjects chosen by the school, and one subject with relevance chosen by voting among the pupils. This may, however, vary between schools throughout the country. If a subject is included in a line of study, its level will be raised. C-level will be raised to B, and B-level to A. If the subject is not mandatory, it will be included as a C-level subject. For instance, English is mandatory at B-level, but if it is in a line of study, it is raised to an A-level. But there are 2 major exceptions: Communication/IT will be raised from C-level to A-level, and Design will be a B-level subject even though it is not a mandatory subject.

Most of the schools offer at least 3 different lines of study, namely:

- "Natural Science" with Mathematics A and Physics A, Chemistry A or Biotechnology A
- "Technical" with Technology A and another relevant subject
- "Communicative" with Communication/IT A and English A or Design B

In the last year of the programme, the students are obliged to choose one of three rather unusual "Area of technical specialization" at level A. In this subject the students spend an entire day at working with specialization. The choice of Area of technical specialization decides the specialization indicated in the certificate. The students can choose between the following specialisations:

- Construction and energy (a subject with emphasis on real-world construction of buildings.)
- Design and production (a subject with emphasis on the design and production of electronics.)
- Process, food and health (a subject with emphasis on chemical processes with regard to the production of consumables.)

=== Methods ===
The teaching is based on vocational theory and method and on practical vocational conditions. The aim of the course to be a preparation for higher education studies must be reflected in the organisation of the teaching. Teaching methods included develop the independence of the students and their ability to argue, generalise and make abstractions.

The teaching is organised so that the subjects support each other with a view to creating an appropriate and equal distribution of the workload of students.

When attending to the HTX programme, one must expect that a great part of the work is done in groups, and that there will be a lot of interdisciplinary projects, too. Although there is also common class education, and lectures in different subjects.

The incorporation of computers is very visible, as over 90% of all students bring their laptop to school for taking notes, calculate (students will get education in programs like MathCad, AutoCAD, Maple and SmartSketch), draw etc. It's not a requirement, but it's a big advantage to have a laptop at the HTX programme. Most schools are able to lend laptops to students who haven't got one themselves.

=== Pupil evaluation ===
Students are given marks for the year's work on the basis of their performance in class and their homework.

As a rule, the examinations are held at the end of the programme. A student can normally only be registered for the examination if they have participated in the instruction, and have handed in required written work and had it approved by the teachers concerned.

Oral and/or written examinations are held in almost all of the subjects. The students' performance at the examination is assessed by the teacher/examiner and external examiner(s) appointed by the Ministry of Education.

=== Certification ===
When the students have completed all the examinations at the end of the 3rd year, the school issues a certificate indicating all the marks obtained by the students at the examination and in the year's work.

The Ministry of Education decides on the design of the certificate.

== Schools in Denmark ==
=== Region Nordjylland ===
- EUC Nord, Frederikshavn (VEC North)
- EUC Nord, Hjørring (VEC North)
- Aalborg Tekniske Skole (Aalborg Technical School) (2 schools)
- Erhversskolerne Aars (The Vocational Schools Aars)
- Nordvestjysk Uddannelsescenter, Thisted (North-West Jutlandic Education Center)

=== Region Midtjylland ===
- Skive Tekniske Skole (Skive Technical School)
- Viborg Tekniske Gymnasium, Mercantec (Viborg College of Technology, Mercantec)
- Randers Tekniske Skole (Randers Technical School)
- Grenaa Tekniske Skole (Grenaa Technical School)
- Silkeborg Tekniske Skole (Silkeborg Technical School)
- Århus Tekniske Skole (Århus Technical School) (3 schools)
- Holstebro Tekniske Gymnasium (Holstebro Technical Gymnasium)
- Herningsholm Erhversskole, HTX Herning (Herning) (Herningsholm Vocational School)
- Uddannelsescenter Ringkøbing-Skjern Skjern (Education Center Ringkobing-Skjern)
- Learnmark Horsens - HTX (Learnmark Gymnasium)

=== Region Syddanmark ===
- Vejle Tekniske Gymnasium (Vejle Technical Gymnasium)
- EUC Lillebælt - In the past named Fredericia-Middelfart Tekniske Skole (Fredericia-Middelfart Technical School)
- HANSENBERG
- Grindsted Erhvervsskole (Grindsted Vocational School)
- EUC Vest, Esbjerg (VEC West)
- EUC Syd, Haderslev (VEC South)
- EUC Syd, Tønder (VEC South)
- EUC Syd, Aabenraa (VEC South)
- EUC Syd, Sønderborg (VEC South)
- Odense Tekniske Gymnasium (Odense Technical Gymnasium)
- Kold Tekniske Gymnasium (Kold Technical Gymnasium)
- Svendborg Erhversskole (Svendborg College of Science Technology and Business)

=== Region Sjælland ===
- EUC Nordvestsjælland, Holbæk (VEC North-West Zealand)
- EUC Ringsted, Ringsted
- Selandia - CEU, Slagelse (Selandia - CVE)
- EUC Lolland, Nakskov (VEC Lolland)
- CEUS, Nykøbing Falster (CVES)
- EUC Sjælland, Næstved (VEC Zealand)
- EUC Sjælland, Køge (VEC Zealand)
- Roskilde Tekniske Gymnasium (Roskilde Technical Gymnasium)
- ZBC Vordingborg (Zealand Business College)

=== Region Hovedstaden ===
- Hillerød Tekniske Gymnasium, Hillerød (Hillerød Technical Gymnasium)
- TEC; Technical Education Copenhagen, Lyngby (Technical Education Copenhagen)
- Ballerup Tekniske Gymnasium (Ballerup Technical Gymnasium)
- TeSe, Ishøj (TeSe)
- TEC; Technical Education Copenhagen, Frederiksberg (Technical Education Copenhagen)
- Københavns Tekniske Skole, HTX Sukkertoppen (Valby) (Copenhagen Technical College)
- Københavns Tekniske Skole, HTX Vibenhus (Østerbro) (Copenhagen Technical College)
- Bornholms Erhvervsskole, Rønne (Bornholm's Vocational School)
