= Folkeskole =

The Danish–Norwegian term Folkeskole ("public school") may refer to any of the following:

- Danish Folkeskole Education, the Danish primary and lower secondary educational system
- Volksschule, a historical primary school system that was in use in Germany
- Folkeskole, the Norwegian historical equivalent of the German system; see Education in Norway
- folkskola, the Swedish historical equivalent of the German system; see Education in Sweden
