= EUC Nord =

Technical school

Coordinates: 57°27′32.22″N 10°0′50.29″E

Information
- Website: www.eucnord.dk

EUC Nord is the fusion of the technical schools in Hjørring and Frederikshavn, in Vendsyssel in Denmark. EUC is an abbreviation of Erhvervsuddannelsescenter, which means Vocational Education Centre.

EUC Nord has six departments: four in Hjørring and two in Frederikshavn. Hjørring has both an HTX and an HHX department besides the vocational education. In Frederikshavn, there is only an HTX department besides the vocational education.
