= Copenhagen Technical College =

School in Copenhagen, Denmark

NEXT Education Copenhagen
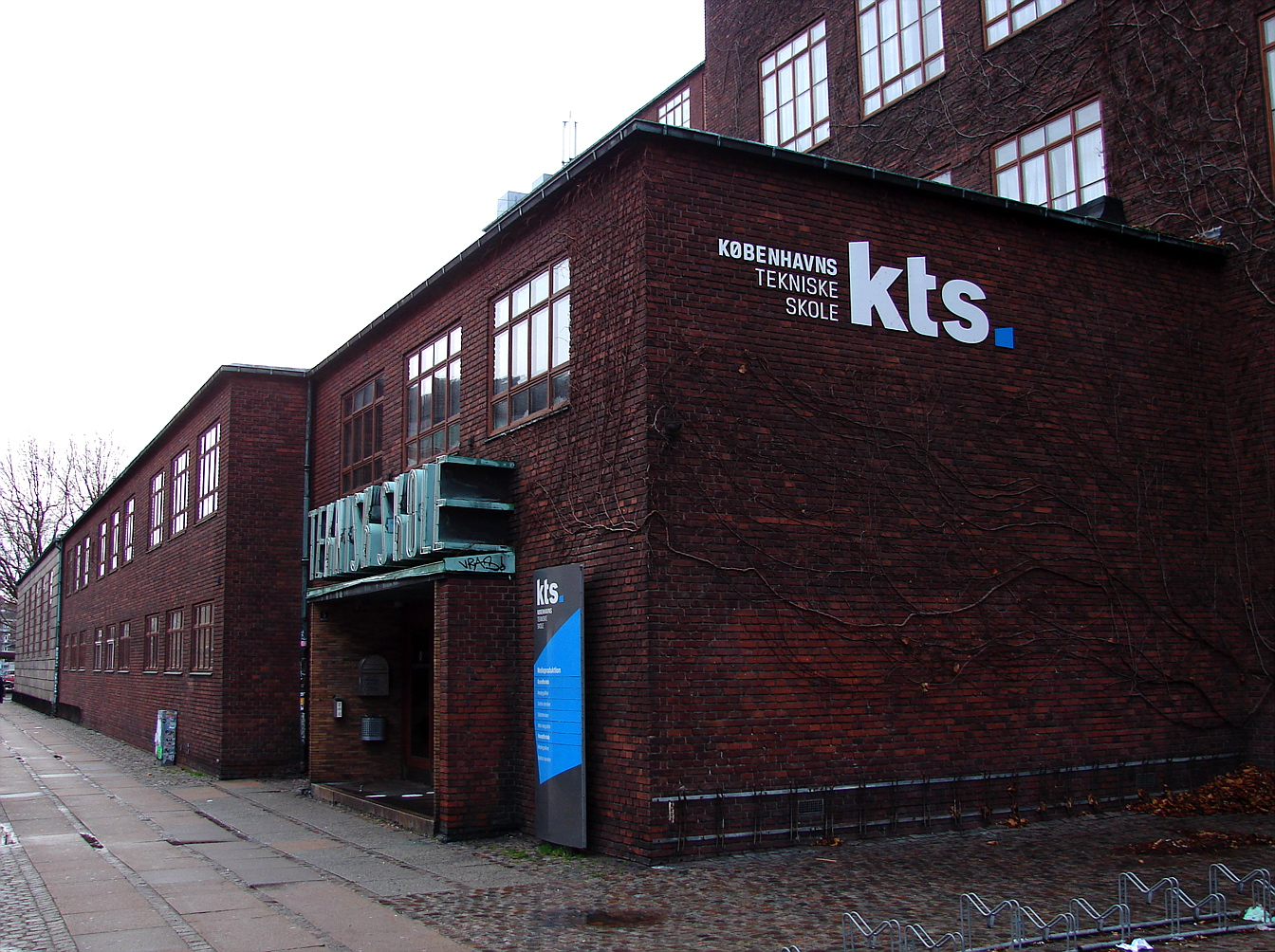
- KTS in 2011
- Type: Secondary education
- Established: 1843
- Chairman: Henrik Saleé
- President: Ole Heinager
- Administrative staff: 577
- Students: 4,438 (2015)
- Location: Copenhagen, Denmark
- Website: https://nextkbh.dk/ https://www.kts.dk/inenglish.asp

NEXT Education Copenhagen former Copenhagen Technical College (Danish: NEXT Uddannelse København or just NEXT, former Københavns Tekniske Skole, KTS) is a school of secondary education in Copenhagen, Denmark. The school offers educational programmes within the technical sciences on a secondary level to post-primary youth, Higher Technical Examination Programme (HTX), and supplementary courses for adults seeking to maintain qualifications (AMU). It is an independent self-owning institution under the Danish state, managed by a board composed of members from the business community in conjunction with a rector that oversees day-to-day operations. It occupies nine locations in the Greater Copenhagen area with the headquarters being located in Valby.

== History ==
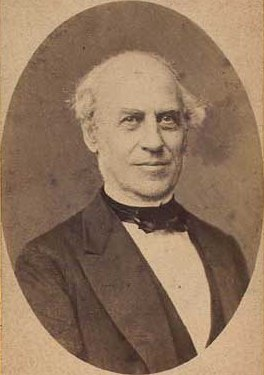
Lasenius Kramp

The college was founded under the name Det Tekniske Institut (The Technical Institute) at the initiative of the joiner Lasenius Kramp. The school was situated in Læderstræde (No. 26) and run by the newly founded Technical Society (Danish: Det Tekniske Selskab). It was supported by the Association of Craftsmen in Copenhagen, which Kramp had co-founded a few years prior, various foundations and individual guilds.

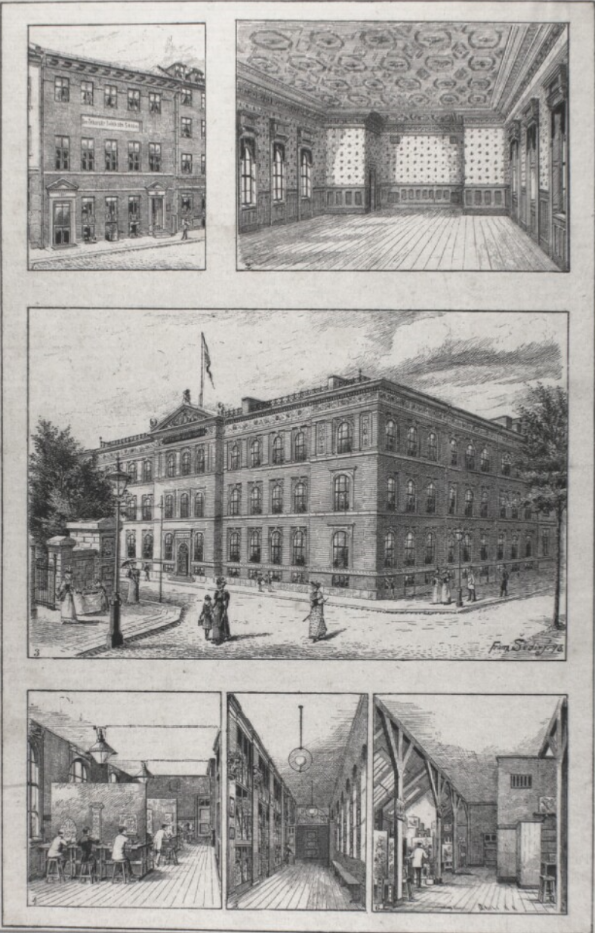
Franz Šedivý: The Technical Society's School, 1893

Disagreements over the education of craftsmen led to the foundation of the New Craftsmen's School (Danish: Ny Haandværkerskole) in 1868. Instigated by Industriforeningen, the rivalry of the between the two schools led to a reorganization of the Technical Society and a merger of the two schools under the name Det Tekniske Selskabs Skole (The Technical Society's School) in 1876.

A new school building designed by Ludvig Fenger on Ahlefeldsgade was inaugurated on 1 October 1881. In 1924–25, the school had 4104, who received their education in the main school or one of the four large and two small branch schools. The Technical Society's School absorbed several other schools over the years while Københavns Teknikum was spun off in 1963 and the School of Applied Arts in 1873. The school revived its current name when the Technical Society was dissolved in 1878. In 2004 the school merged with AMU-Center København.

On 1 January 2016, Copenhagen Technical College merged with Cph West.

== Campuses ==
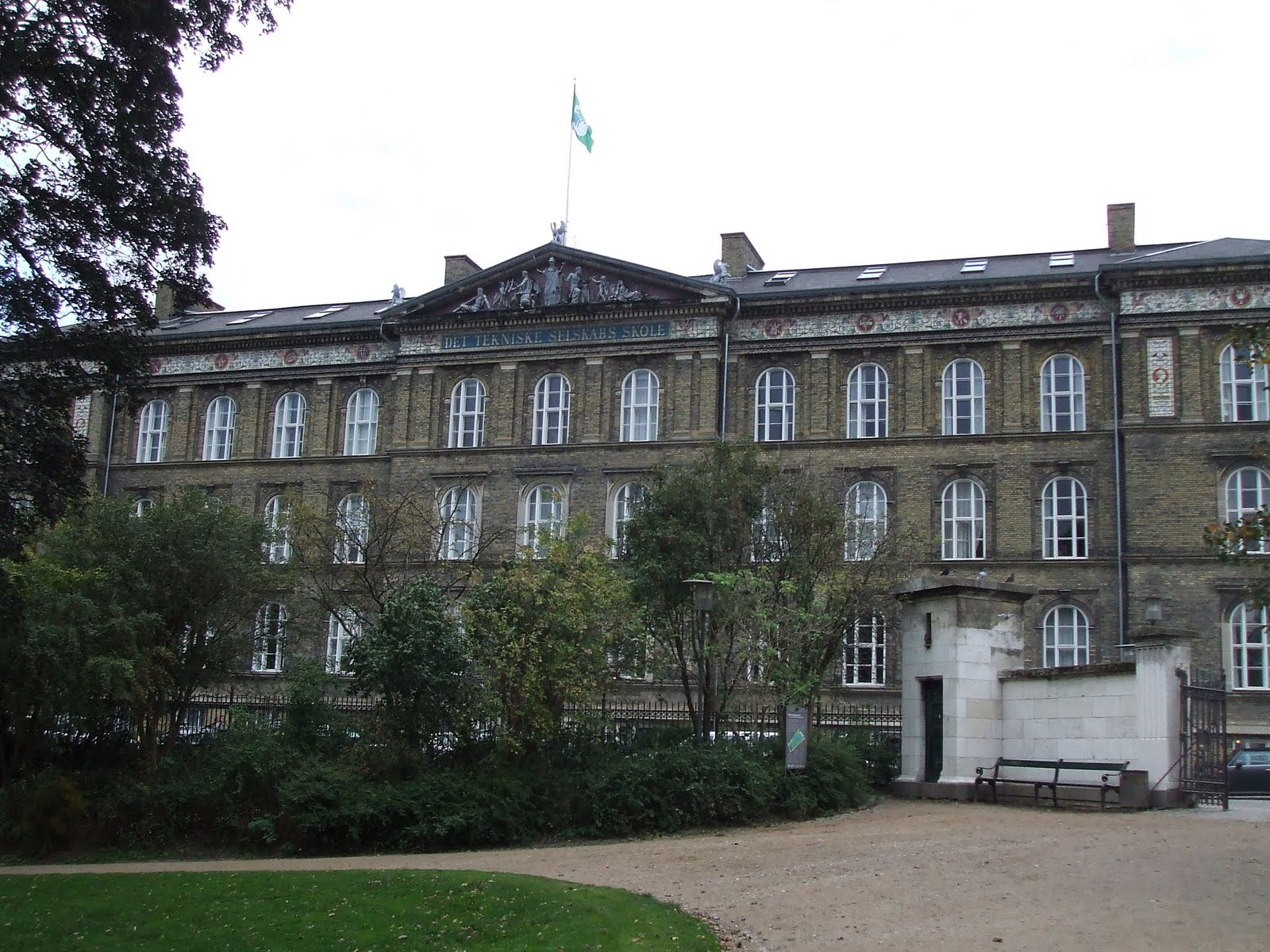
The school's former main building on Ahlefeldsgade

Copenhagen Technical College occupies a total of nine locations in the Greater Copenhagen area. The school headquarters are located at Carl Jacobsens Vej 25 in Valby. The Valby campus is also home to HTX Sukkertoppen. The building is a former sugar processing plant from 1913. Another school with HTX programmes, HTX Vibenhus, is located on Jagtvej (No. 163) in Østerbro. The seven remaining locations are:

- Emdrup, Tuborgvej 177, 2400 København NV
- Nørrebro, Rebslagervej 11, 2400 København NV
- Frederiksberg, Julius Thomsens Gade 5, 1974 Frederiksberg C
- Glostrup, Fabriksparken 31, Glostrup
- Herlev, Marielundvej 44, 2730 Herlev
- Kastrup, Brønderslev Alle 25, 2770 Kastrup
- Rødovre: Tæbyvej 65, 2610 Rødovre
- Albertslund
- Ballerup
- Glostrup
- Ishøj
- Taastrup
