= Higher Preparatory Examination (HF) =

School exam in Denmark

The Higher Preparatory Examination (in Danish: Højere Forberedelseseksamen or HF) is a 2-year general upper secondary programme building on to the 10th form of the Folkeskole and leading to the higher preparatory examination (the HF-examination), which qualifies for admission to higher education, subject to the special entrance regulations applying to the individual higher education programmes.

== Types of institutions ==
There are approximately 75 institutions offering full-time programmes leading to the HF-examination. Most of them are attached to Gymnasiums (61) and mainly offer full-time 2-year programmes, some are attached to colleges of education, and about 75 adult education centres. The smallest HF-establishment has 40 students, the biggest 415 students (2001).

== Admission requirements ==
In order to be admitted to an HF-programme in one or more subjects, the student must have finished the basic school at least one year before admission. Students wishing to be admitted directly from the basic school must have completed the 10th year of the basic school. There are exceptions, an interview is held before admission where the interviewer, who is a representative from the school in question, can determine whether the student is eligible for admission, even if the student didn't attend the 10th grade. To get admission to HF without finishing the 10th grade, you have to have gone to another school higher than the 9th grade as STX, HTX or HHX but without finishing them. This allows people who have the necessary abilities to finish HHX to get admission without having gone to 10th grade.

All pupils, who have received the relevant teaching and passed the prescribed examinations, can continue in an upper secondary programme more or less of their own choice.

Access is however not totally free to the general upper secondary programmes. If a school finds that the pupil and his or her parents do not take the guidance provided seriously, and that there is a risk that the pupil cannot meet the requirements of the general upper secondary programmes, the pupil may be recommended to sit for an admission test to one of the general upper secondary programmes.

== Levels and age groups ==
The HF-programme is a 2-year programme based on the 10th form of the Folkeskole. The teaching is divided into a 1st and a 2nd year.

The students have different teachers in the different subjects, and it is normal that these teachers stay with the class for the entire 2-year programme.

== General objectives ==
The programme leading to the HF-examination is intended to be a course of general education preparing adults and young people for further studies. The teaching contributes to the participants’ personal development, and to developing their interest in and ability to participate actively in a democratic society. The HF-examination qualifies the candidate for admission to higher education, subject to the restrictions appearing from the regulations laid down to this effect.

== Curriculum, subjects, number of hours ==
At the commencement of the instruction in a subject, the teacher either prepares a plan for the first term's teaching in collaboration with the students or he informs the students of such a plan. In the later phases of the instruction, the teacher and the students plan the work together. The teacher and the students regularly discuss the instruction given. The options to be offered for examination are chosen in consultation with the students and must be approved by the Ministry of Education. The instruction in the individual class is coordinated with a view to achieving coherence between the various subjects and a suitable distribution of the students' workload.

A complete HF-examination consists of a cluster of common core subjects, three optional subjects and a major written assignment. The foreign languages can be taken at beginner level and continuation level, the latter requiring a certain previous knowledge.

== Methods ==
The instruction is provided in the form of class instruction in the individual subjects. There is project work in certain subjects, which will often be carried out in groups (group work).

The instruction must constitute a whole and must therefore be organised so that the subjects give mutual support to each other. The instruction in the individual class must be co-ordinated to ensure coherence between the subjects and a suitable distribution of the students' workload.

== Pupil evaluation ==
The students receive progress reports and grades throughout the two years and a final end-of-year or end-of-term examination is given in each subject of study.

Another important difference from the Gymnasium is that a complete HF-examination requires an examination in all subjects (except for visual arts, PE and sport and music at common core level). The examination takes place at the end of the year in which the instruction in the subject ends.

It is possible to omit sitting for an examination in a common core subject, if the subject in question has been chosen as an optional subject. This does not however apply to the common core subjects of mathematics and physics/chemistry, in which there will always be an examination.

Both written and oral examinations are held in the following subjects: Danish, English (optional), German/French (continuation level as optional subject), mathematics common core, mathematics optional, and in subjects chosen at high level.

In the remaining subjects, only oral examinations are held. Written examination questions are produced by the Ministry of Education's Department of General Upper Secondary Education. For each subject, there is an examination committee consisting of hand- picked teachers and the department's subject advisers for the subject in question. Oral examinations are held in subjects selected (at random) by the Department of General Upper Secondary Education for each individual school.

Written examination papers are marked by two external examiners, i.e. the teacher has no share in the mark given, but is given two days to ask for a reconsideration of individual marks. At oral examinations, the teacher and one external examiner together decide on the mark to be given, where the external examiner has the last word.

For each subject, there is a permanent group of external examiners made up from teachers - with 5% of the members from other sectors of the education system or from industry.

== Certification ==
The responsible authority for the content and examinations is the Ministry of Education.

The title of the examination taken at the end of the HF-programme is the higher preparatory examination (Danish: højere forberedelseseksamen). Students who have passed the examination are issued with a certificate, which contains the following information:

- 1) marks in common core subjects which have not also been chosen as optional subjects,
- 2) marks in optional subjects,
- 3) the mark for the major written assignment,
- 4) the average mark, calculated with one decimal.

The certificate is signed by the headmaster of the HF-establishment, where the examination has been taken. Certificates are drawn up by the Ministry of Education. Only one original certificate must be issued. A copy, including a translated certificate (the certificate also exists in English, German and French) must be designated "copy".

Ministerial regulations have been issued with regard to the award of credits in connection with teaching and examinations for students who have followed the instruction and taken examinations from other programmes at upper secondary level.
