= Zealand Business College =

Zealand Business College (ZBC) is a private Danish vocational high school. It has nine campuses and over 6,000 students.
