= Gymnasium (Denmark) =

Secondary school programme

The Danish gymnasium offers a 3-year general academically-oriented upper secondary program which builds on the 9th-10th form of the Folkeskole and leads to the upper secondary school exit examination (the studentereksamen). This qualifies a student for admission to higher education Preparatory, subject to the special entrance regulations applying to the individual higher education programmes. Colloquially, gymnasium refers to what is formally called STX.

Apart from the common academic gymnasium, there are other types of occupation-oriented upper secondary education in Denmark. The main ones are højere handelseksamen or HHX ("Higher Commercial Examination Programme"), højere teknisk eksamen or HTX ("Higher Technical Examination Programme"), and højere forberedelseseksamen or HF ("Higher Preparatory Examination Programme").

== Gymnasium ==
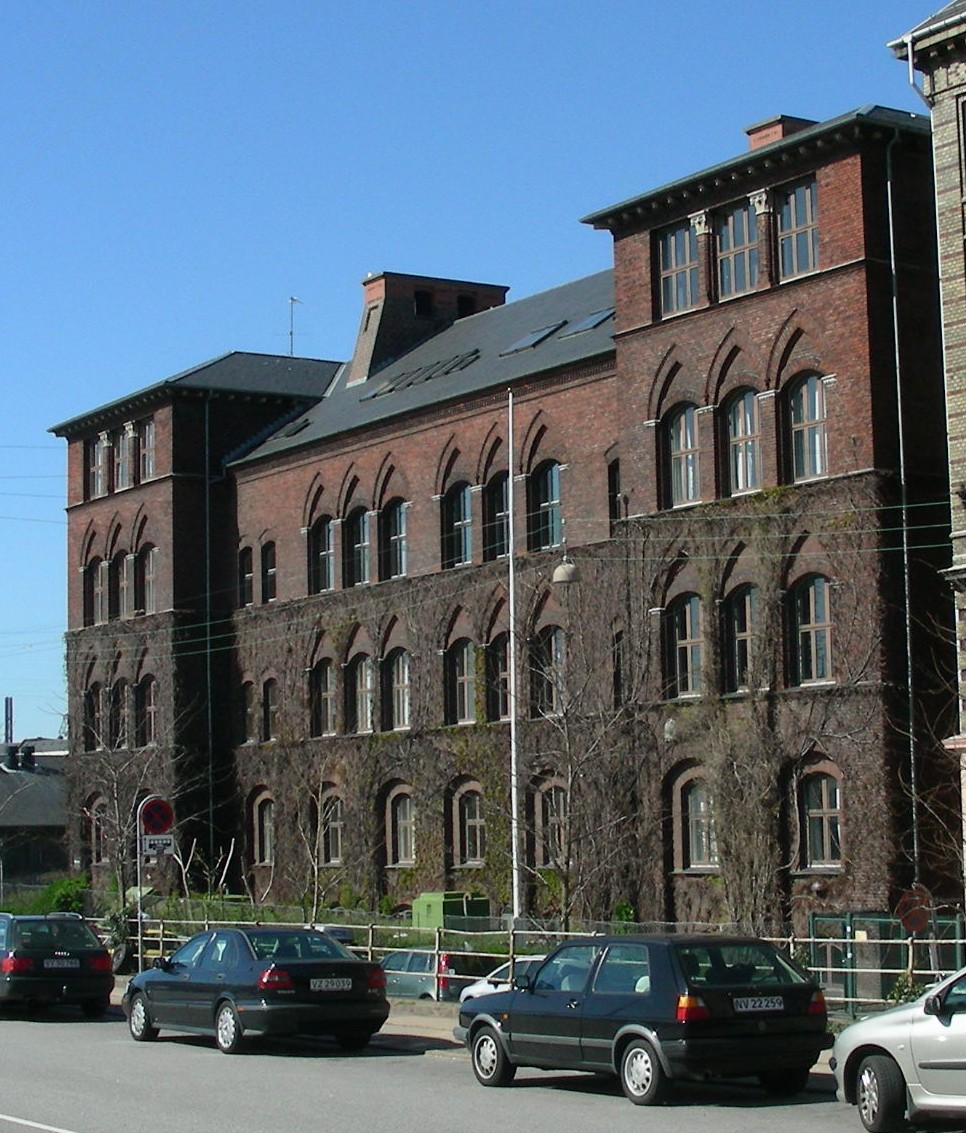
Rysensteen Gymnasium in Copenhagen

=== Types of Institutions ===
As of 2015, an academically-oriented general upper secondary education which leads to an upper secondary school exit examination is offered at approximately 140 gymnasiums of varying size, distributed all over Denmark. As of 2015 the smallest gymnasium has 36 students, the largest 1470.

An upper secondary school leaving examination can also be taken within special 2-year courses for adult students.

=== Admission Requirements ===
In order to be admitted to the first year of the gymnasium, pupils must have completed the 10th year of primary school. Danish Primary school goes from 0th to 9th (10 years in total).

All pupils that have received the relevant education and passed the prescribed examinations can continue to an upper secondary programme of more or less their own choosing.

Access, however, is not always automatically granted to general upper secondary programmes. If a school finds that the pupil and their parents are not taking the education and guidance provided seriously, and/or that there is a risk that the pupil will not be able to meet the requirements of the general upper secondary programmes, the pupil may be recommended to sit for an admission test to one of the general upper secondary programmes.

=== Subjects and Specialisation ===
When a student is admitted to a gymnasium, they choose a studieretning ("specialized study programme") between a number of different programmes with different subjects. These subjects in these programmes are customised by the local school leadership. Each school has to offer at least 4 different programmes, with a least one focusing on mathematics and natural science, one focusing on foreign languages, and one focusing on social studies.

At a beginning of a course, students are divided into classes, usually based on their choice of line, and each student takes all their obligatory subjects together with their class, but with a different teacher for each subject.

A course of instruction lasts three years and comprises obligatory subjects common to all students, subjects that are part of the student's study programme, and elective subjects. Many subjects can be studied at different levels, called A, B and C; A is the highest level which usually means the student has to study this subject for all three years of the gymnasium course.

The obligatory subjects for STX students are: classical studies (oldtidskundskab) (level C), religious studies (C), Danish (A), English (B), history (A), mathematics (B), physics (C), physical education (C), and social studies (C). In addition, while English is compulsory for all, each student also has to study another modern foreign language at either A or B level depending on whether it is taken continued or as beginner (the most common are German, French, Spanish and Italian). Continued language courses on B level are only available for German and French. The student is also required to study an artistic subject (e.g. music or visual arts) at level C, and two of the subjects biology (C), chemistry (C) and physical geography (C). Most of the obligatory subjects can be studied at a higher level if the student elects to do so.

The elective subjects are: astronomy, biology, biotechnology, business economics, chemistry, computer science, design, drama, Greek, media-subject, Latin, music, physical geography, philosophy, psychology, rhetorics, study of technology, visual arts, and others. It is also possible to study a third and even a fourth foreign language.

There are certain requirements as to how many subjects each student has to take and at how high levels. For instance, all students have to take at least four subjects at level A (there are two compulsory subjects at this the highest level: Danish and History), and all students have to take a natural science subject at level B.

In addition to the regular subjects there are also a couple of special subjects. The first one is called almen sprogforståelse which teaches a student general linguistics and gives the student the ability to analyze sentences. In addition to the general part of that subject there is also a Latin part which aims to give the student a very basic understanding of a Latin language. The idea of the subject is to form a basis for language related subjects throughout the gymnasium.

Another subject is almen studieforberedelse. The purpose of that subject is to introduce the student to a three main areas of study the gymnasium deals with: the humanities, social science and natural science. Furthermore, it aims to give a student knowledge about different methodology used by different faculties. Lessons encompass a combination of two or more of the student's other subjects (e.g. Danish, history and physics). The student will learn to use the methodology theory it has learned to work with and solve complex problems.

==== The classical line ====
As of 2014, approximately 15 gymnasiums (N. Zahle's Gymnasium, Ribe Katedralskole and Thisted Gymnasium to name a few) offer the classical line (den klassiske linje or den klassisksproglige linje, "the line of classical languages") consisting of Latin and Ancient Greek, the subjects of classical philology, at A level. The goal of the line is a thorough understanding of the languages, works, world view, etc. of the classical time period, and classical works (or parts of them) such as Homer's Odyssey and Iliad and Ovid's Metamorphoses are often read in translation or in their original languages.

There is a tradition that students with Latin and/or Ancient Greek receive a black graduation cap instead of the standard white one when they graduate. This is a homage to older times when gymnasiums were known as "Latin schools" due to the prominent role of Latin at the time. The original graduation cap of this age was black, and thus it has become tradition for graduates with Latin and/or Ancient Greek to choose a black (albeit modern) version of the graduation cap (though a black cap in the original style is also an option). Other traditions regarding the black cap exist as well, but there are no official restrictions: Any graduating student may select a black graduation cap if he/she so wishes, but it is generally frowned upon, and there is even debate about the different traditions and about who should have the right to wear the black cap.

=== General Objectives ===
In continuation of the 9th form of the basic school, the gymnasium provides a 3-year course of continued general education. This covers the necessary basis for further studies and is completed by an examination (the upper secondary school exit examination). The upper secondary school exit examination, called studentereksamen in Danish, qualifies the student for admission to higher education, subject to regulations. The teaching must furthermore contribute to the pupils’ personal development and enlightenment, developing their interest in and ability to participate actively in a democratic society.

=== Instruction ===
At the commencement of the instruction, the teacher either prepares a plan for the autumn term's teaching in collaboration with the students or informs the students of such a plan. In the later phases of the instruction, the teacher and the students plan the work together. The teacher and the students regularly discuss the instruction given. Instruction in the individual classes is co-ordinated with a view to achieving a coherence between the different subjects and a suitable distribution of the student's workload.

The instruction is usually organised as a combination of lecture, group work, practical experiments, and homework.

=== Examination ===
Throughout the gymnasium the student will undergo various examinations. Examinations are usually either oral or written and in most cases the student is allowed to use all types of aids except for communication with other people. Some examinations allow preparation at home while others give a set amount of time for preparation at the gymnasium which is then immediately followed by the actual examination.

Some examinations are obligatory for all students (e.g. written Danish). Examinations in other subjects are chosen each year by the Ministry of Education for the individual student.

The students performance is marked according to syv-trins-skalaen (the seven-step-scale) and the student must receive at least 02 for the test to be considered passed.

=== Certification ===
The authority responsible for the content and examinations is the Ministry of Education.

The title of the examination taken at the end of the gymnasium is the studentereksamen. Students, who have passed the studentereksamen, are presented with a certificate, which contains the following information:

- all marks for the year's work,
- examination marks, including marks for the years work in subjects in which there has been no examination,
- the two average figures,
- the examination result, etc.

The certificate is signed by the headmaster of the gymnasium where the examination has been taken. Certificates are drawn up by the Ministry of Education. Only one original certificate may be issued. A copy, including a translated certificate (the certificate is translated into English, German and French) must be designated 'copy'.

=== Teachers ===
The students have different teachers for different subjects, and it is normal that these teachers stay with a class for an entire course. A teacher usually holds a combined master's degree in two different subjects which are the only subjects which that teacher is qualified to teach. In addition to their university studies, newly employed teachers take a pædagogikum which since August 2009 is a one-year part-time course in pedagogy, having previously been a two-year course.

== History ==
The studentereksamen (originally named examen artium) was originally created in 1630 an entrance exam carried out by the University. Starting in 1850, gymnasiums (then called lærde skoler ("learned schools") or latinskoler ("Latin schools")) started examining the students. In 1871, the gymnasium education was divided into the mathematical-scientific and linguistic-historical lines of study. At the same time, the entrance exam at university for self-taught people was abolished. Women were not allowed to take the studentereksamen until 1875.

In 1903, the lines of study were changed to mathematical-scientific, modern-lingual, and classical-lingual, and the name of the schools was officially changed to gymnasium. From 1958 there were two lines of study, mathematical-scientific and linguistic, and after first year, the students had to choose between different branches (e.g. modern languages or classical languages). This system was however changed in 1988, where the students in their second year were able to choose more freely between a variety of subjects (a student could for instance have both a language and a scientific subject at the highest level, even if he had originally chosen the mathematical line of study).

The two line system was abolished in 2005 and the gymnasium was completely re-formed. More lines of study, decided by each gymnasium itself, were offered, and it was generally perceived to give a greater amount of customisability to the students. Instead of choosing a line of study when enrolling, the students now only let the school know what line they intend to choose, and the final decision is made after half a year of introduction to the different faculties (primarily the arts, languages and natural science). Furthermore, a wide range of general subjects, like for instance social studies, were made mandatory.

== See also ==
- Gymnasium (school)
- Secondary education in Denmark
- Matriculation examination
- Other academically oriented upper secondary programmes in Denmark:
  - Higher Preparatory Examination (HF)
  - Higher Commercial Examination Programme
  - Higher Technical Examination Programme (HTX)
- Student cap
