= Secondary education in Denmark =

Level of Danish schooling

Secondary education in Denmark (in Danish: ungdomsuddannelse, "youth education") usually takes two to four years and is attended by students between the ages of 15 and 19, after finishing primary education by 9th or 10th grade. Secondary education is not compulsory, but usually free of charge, and students have a wide range of programmes to choose from. Some education programmes are oriented towards higher education, the most common being the Gymnasium. Others are more practically orientated, training students for jobs such as artisans or clerks through a combination of instruction in vocational schools and apprenticeship.

== Gymnasium ==
The Gymnasium has its origin in the cathedral and monastery schools established by the Roman Catholic Church in the early Middle Ages, and seven of the schools established in the 12th and 13th centuries still exist today. The medieval schools had, broadly speaking, only one purpose: to educate the servants of the Catholic Church by teaching them to read, write, and speak Latin and Greek. After the Reformation's official implementation in 1536, the schools were taken over by the Crown; their primary purpose remained preparing students for theological studies, only now it was for the benefit of the Protestant Church.

This educational base remained nearly unchanged until 1809, when the old Clergyman's School was transformed, in accordance with the spirit of the time, into a humanistic Civil Servant's School, the purpose of which was to "foster true humanity" through immersion in the ancient Greek and Latin cultures combined with some teaching of natural science and modern languages.

In 1871, the scientific and technical development of the 19th century led to a division of the education curriculum into two lines: the languages and the mathematics-science line. This division remained the backbone of the structure of the Gymnasium until the year 2005, when a major reform of the Gymnasium was enacted. Today, each Gymnasium offers a selection of lines decided by each individual Gymnasium. These typically include various linguistic, scientific, and creative lines, as well as combined-subject lines.

In 1903, the languages line was divided into a classical line, preserving extensive teaching in Latin and Greek, and a modern languages line, in which Latin and Greek were replaced by English, German, and French. At the same time, the three-year course of the Gymnasium was directly connected with the municipal school through the establishment of the mellemskole ("middle school", grades 6–9), later to be replaced by the realskole.

According to the latest reform, the Gymnasium still offers three years of general upper secondary education in two lines. The division of the two lines into three branches each has however been replaced by a more flexible system, under which each of the lines contains a core curriculum of obligatory subjects and a number of optional subjects which can be taken at two levels.

== Higher Preparatory Examination ==
The Higher Preparatory Examination (HF) was introduced in 1967 in a political climate that was characterised by a desire to extend educational possibilities to new groups in society. Originally, it was the idea to create a two-year course aimed specifically at prospective candidates for teacher training. There was however a concern that this concept might result in an educational cul-de-sac. So the course design was changed into an alternative route to further and higher education.

The students that were entering the new HF-programmes were mainly adults. But from the start, the HF also appealed to young people who for social or personal reasons had not followed the straight route via the Gymnasium to higher education.

The HF is thus the "sweeper" of the general upper secondary education level. In the Gymnasium, there is still an overrepresentation of middle class children (40% male/60% female), whereas the HF recruits its predominantly female students from a broader base of society (30% male/70% female).

== Higher Commercial Examination Programme ==
The Higher Commercial Examination Programme (HHX) started in 1888 on a private initiative at Niels Brock's Business College in Copenhagen with a structure, which can mostly be found in the course today. The range of subjects comprised both commercial and general subjects.

In 1920, the Rigsdag (the parliament of the time) adopted the first business college act, which i.a. entitled the Niels Brock Business College to call itself a "higher business school". This act introduced supervision of the activities of the business colleges, and the HHX became a State-controlled examination. In 1927, the first ministerial orders were issued regarding the content of the teaching which in all essentials dealt with the existing teaching.

The course was managed by the Ministry of Trade until 1965, when the responsibility was transferred to the Ministry of Educacion.

The HHX did not originally qualify for admission to universities and other higher education institutions in the university sector. The universities did not consider the general part of the programme sufficient. It was not until 1972, that the HHX was given the status of a university entrance examination in connection with a revision of the content, along with the introduction of more rigorous admission requirements. At the beginning of the 1970s, about half of the Danish business colleges offered the programme. By 1982, the course was offered at all Danish business.

== Higher Technical Examination Programme ==
The Higher Technical Examination Programme (HTX) was established on an experimental basis in 1982. The reason for its establishment was a desire to contribute to a broader supply of education and training possibilities following the EFG-basic courses and a desire to create a new and relevant way of access to higher education in the technical area. In this context, it was of importance that fewer and fewer skilled workers continued at the engineering colleges, whereas the number of general upper secondary graduates increased significantly.

Another reason for establishing the HTX-programme on an experimental basis was the need to strengthen the status of the technical schools. Broad education and training possibilities at the schools were to provide a broader and qualitatively better recruitment.

In 1982, the HTX-experiment was carried out at the technical schools in Sønderborg, Aalborg, and Copenhagen. The pilot period lasted until the spring of 1988, after which the programme was evaluated and made permanent after minor adjustments had been made to the individual subjects. On the same occasion, the HTX-examination was granted the status of a university entrance examination, and the graduates were now in principle placed on an equal footing with those of the Gymnasium, the HF and the HHX programmes as far as access to higher education was concerned.

== Comparison of the three main Secondary Educations ==
=== Studentereksamen: The Danish General Upper Secondary School Leaving Certificate ===
- (STX) General Upper Secondary Education – The General Upper Secondary Examination: The STX-education accomplishes subjects within arts, social and natural science.
- (HTX) General Upper Secondary Education – The Higher Technical Examination: The HTX-education accomplishes subjects within the areas of technological- and natural science in combination with general subjects.
- (HHX) General Upper Secondary Education – The Higher Commercial Examination: The HHX-education accomplishes subjects within mercantile, international and vocational formation perspectives.

The upper secondary courses are at three levels: level C (1 year), level B (2 years) and level A (3 years), of which the following subjects are compulsories:

	STX	HTX	HHX
	13 subjects in total	11 subjects in total	11 subjects in total
Compulsory A-level subjects:	minimum of 4 subjects	minimum of 3 subjects	minimum of 4 subjects
	Danish	Danish	Danish
	History	Technical Science*	English
Compulsory B-level subjects:	minimum of 3 subjects	minimum of 5 subjects	minimum of 6 subjects
	2nd foreign language	Chemistry	2nd foreign language
	English	English	Business Economics
		Mathematics	Contemporary History
		Physics	International Economics
		Technology	Marketing
		History of Ideas	Mathematics
Compulsory C-level subjects:			
	Classical Studies	Biology	Commercial Law
	Culture Science*	Information Technology or Communication & ICT	Information Technology
	Mathematics	Social Science	Social Science
	Natural Sciences*		
	Natural Sciences*		
	Physical Education and Sport (PE)		
	Physics		
	Religious Studies		
	Social Science		
Electives			
	Arabic B- or A-level	Astronomy C-level	Astronomy C-level
	Astronomy C-level	Biology B-level	Business Economics C or A-level
	Biology C-, B- or A-level	Biotechnology B- or A-level	Chinese B- or A-level
	Business Economics C-level	Business Economics C-level	Commercial Law B-level
	Chemistry C-, B- or. A-level	Chemistry A-level	Cultural Studies C- or B-level
	Chinese B- or A-level	Communication & ICT A-level	Design C- or B-level
	Cultural Studies C- or B-level	Cultural Studies C- or B-level	Financing C- or B-level
	Dance C- or B-level	Design C- or B-level	French Advanced Level B or A
	Design & architecture C- or B-level	English A-level	French Intermediate Level A
	Drama C- or B-level	Financing C-level	German Advanced Level B or A
	English A-level	German Advanced Level B or A	German Intermediate Level A
	French Advanced Level B or A	Information Technology C- or B-level	Example
	French Intermediate Level A	Innovation C- or B-level	Information Technology B-level
	German Advanced Level B or A	International Technology and Culture C-level	Innovation C- or B-level
	German Intermediate Level A	Marketing B-level	International Economics A-level
	Greek C- or A-level	Marketing Communication C-level	International Technology and Culture C-level
	Information Technology C-level	Mathematics A-level	Marketing A-level
	Innovation C- or B-level	Media Studies C-level	Marketing Communication C-level
	International Technology and Culture C-level	Music- & Sound Production C-level	Mathematics A-level
	Italian B- or A-level	Organizational Studies C-level	Media Studies C- or B-level
	Japanese B- or A-level	Philosophy C-level	Music- & Sound Production C-level
	Latin C-, B- or A-level	Physical Education and Sport (PE) C- or B-level	Organizational Studies C-level
	Mathematics B- or A-level	Physics A-level	Philosophy C-level
	Media Studies C-, B- or A-level	Programming C- or B-level	Physical Education and Sport (PE) C- or B-level
	Music C-, B- or A-level	Psychology C- or B-level	Programming C-level
	Natural Geography C- or B-level	Social Science B-level	Psychology C- or B-level
	Organizational Studies C-level	Statistics C-level	Russian A-level
	Philosophy C- or B-level	Technology A-level	Social Science B-level
	Physical Education and Sport (PE) B-level	Technology of Materials C-level	Spanish A-level
	Physics B- or A-level	Theory of Static and Strength C-level	Statistics C-level
	Programming C- or B-level		Theory of Static and Strength C-level
	Psychology C- or B-level		
	Religious Studies B-level		
	Rhetoric C-level		
	Russian B- or. A-level		
	Social Science B- or A-level		
	Spanish A-level		
	Statistics C-level		
	Technology C-level		
	Theory of Static and Strength C-level		
	Turkish B- or A-level		
	Visual Arts C- or B-level		

- *Technical Science includes one of the following four courses: Building & Energy, Development & Production, Digital Design & Development and Process, Food Technology & Health
- *Culture Science includes one of the following five courses: Design & Architecture, Drama, Media Studies, Music and Visual Arts
- *Natural Sciences includes two of the following four courses: Biology, Chemistry, Information Technology and Natural Geography

=== Vocational secondary education ===
This section deals with the vocational education and training and basic social and health education programmes.

Apprenticeship training in a well-organised form originates in the guilds of the Middle Ages. Each trade had its own guild in each town. The guilds fixed the duration of the training of apprentices, their wages and working conditions and the disciplines they were to learn. It was furthermore the guilds which held the journeymen's tests.

=== Basic social and health education ===
The basic social and health education programmes (SOSU) were introduced in 1991, and the basic education programme for educator assistants was introduced in 1997. These programmes form part of the vocational upper secondary education system in Denmark.
