= Danish Folkeskole Education =

Public primary school system in Denmark

The folkeskole (English: 'people's school') is a type of school in Denmark covering the entire period of compulsory education, from the age of 6 to 16, encompassing pre-school, primary and lower secondary education.

== Historical overview ==
Legend has it that Ansgar, a French Benedictine monk, was the first missionary to visit Denmark around 822, purchased the freedom of twelve male thralls and educated them in the first school in Denmark, at Hedeby in Schleswig. This was the forerunner of the religious houses which sprang forth over the entire country from about 1100 onwards. In their cloisters, boys from surrounding villages — and occasionally girls as well — received elementary instruction in the Mass and in dogma.

However, quite early trade and crafts demanded more practical schools. The primitive writing-and-counting schools had their origins here, usually with very mediocre teachers, but they were very useful and therefore they flourished, maintained by private support and by the guilds.

=== Reformation ===
The Lutheran Reformation came to Denmark from Germany in 1536. As in Germany, Protestants quickly broke up the Catholic school system. The religious houses were closed and the vast estates of the Roman Catholic Church taken over by the Crown. This meant that the state also took over such tasks as education.

The Church Law of 1539 contains Denmark's first educational legislation with a formal requirement for schools in all provincial boroughs. While new grammar schools sprang up, laying the foundation of classically humanism among the higher strata of society, the broad masses had to be content with the old Danish schools or writing schools which provided a primitive form of instruction.

A substantial stride was taken in the direction of popular education in 1721, when King Frederick IV established 240 schoolhouses bearing the royal insignia and called them Cavalry schools after a division of the country into military districts. At the same time, the new religious movement of Pietism was spreading from Germany to Denmark. It aroused among church people a sense of responsibility towards forthcoming generations and enjoyed royal support. A series of calls by the church for universal confirmation which could only be met by some degree of literacy, brought many new schools into existence. Thus, a limited kind of compulsory education was formally introduced.

However, it was the 'philanthropic' movement, a very active current of educational thought inspired by Jean-Jacques Rousseau in the second half of the 18th century, that first succeeded in creating a real school for ordinary people, open to all children.

Planned training of teachers developed in parsonages and state training colleges, and two Education Acts were enacted in 1814, introducing better municipal primary schools and independent schools for children in rural areas all over Denmark.

=== Grundtvig ===
When a prolonged agricultural crisis and economic slump after the Napoleonic Wars threatened to cripple the entire educational reform programme, the government had to resort to a distressingly mechanical method of education, the so-called Bell-Lancaster method imported from the industrial north of England, which reduced the number of teachers by a drastic simplification of the curriculum to enable preposterously large numbers of pupils to be taught by a single individual. After some years, this method provoked increasing opposition from parents, who wanted more liberal and inspiring forms of education. Their demands received vigorous support from the poet-clergyman N. F. S. Grundtvig, who exercised a powerful influence on the development of Danish schools. Grundtvig wanted to reduce the task of children's schools to no more than the teaching of reading, writing and arithmetic in order to make room, either at home or at school, for a liberal narrative education that would build on the natural potential for development inherent in the child's mind.

Grundtvig's ideas were translated into practice by Christen Kold, who created a distinctively Danish parent-controlled school known as the free school as an alternative to state-sponsored education, exercising a growing influence over the latter's mode of functioning.

The Education Act of 1894 improved teacher training in several important respects. As Danish agriculture continued to modernise and Danish society continued to urbanise, new Education Acts were brought forth around 1900, which changed the Danish basic school by expanding its curriculum. A four-year middle school for students over 11 years of age was established in 1903 to form a bridge between the folkeskole and the realskole (lower secondary school) and the gymnasium. The middle schools rapidly attained great popularity, and over the next half-century, large numbers of children and young people used them as a stepping stone to upper secondary education.

The strong attraction to the upper classes to the folkeskole gradually weakened. Since the conception of the welfare state was intensifying the demand for social equality and democratisation, middle schools were reorganised in 1958 to include two academic paths: a three-year academically oriented real department and the 8th–10th forms.

=== Modern form ===
New acts in 1937, 1958, and 1975 reflected the demands of a new age in terms of equal access to all forms of education. The act of 1975 abolished the real-department and introduced two completely new examinations: the Exit Examination of the Folkeskole and the Advanced Exit Examination of the Folkeskole held on a single-subject basis.

A new act in 1990 introduced new provisions regarding the administration of the schools with more managerial competence vested in the headteacher and the setting up of school boards with large parental representation. Finally, another act that came into force in 1994 stipulated that the folkeskole give a student the opportunity to develop as many of their talents as possible. One of the watchwords of the new act is differentiated teaching, or that teaching should be adapted as much as possible to the individual student.

== Types of institutions ==
There are different ways of meeting the rules pertaining to compulsory education: by attending the municipal folkeskole, a private school, by home tuition, or as far as the last two to three years of the basic school are concerned by attending one of the alternative school forms: the efterskole, or the youth schools.

=== Municipal folkeskole ===
Municipal folkeskoles have about 88% of all pupils of compulsory school age. They provide basic education free of charge to children between the ages of seven and sixteen, or through the voluntary pre-school, the nine years of compulsory education, to the voluntary tenth year.

There are three different types of folkeskoles, those with a pre-school and 1st–10th form levels, those with a pre-school and 1st-7th form levels, and those with only three or more consecutive form levels. The latter may be placed under the management of another school unless the enrollment is more than 100.

Compulsory education can thus not be met fully in the second or third type of schools, and students of such schools have to switch schools after the 7th form. The first type of school is common in areas with a large pupil-basis, whereas more thinly populated municipalities may have a number of the second and third type school and only one or two of the first type. The smallest school has six students and the largest 892, with the average school containing 320 pupils (1999).

==== Admission requirements ====
Any child resident in Denmark is subject to 10 years of compulsory education from the age of six to sixteen. The first year is pre-school, referred to as kindergarten class or 0th form. An additional non-compulsory 10th form is offered at many schools. Children who are to live in Denmark for a minimum of six months are subject to the regulations on compulsory education. Compulsory education means an obligation to participate in the teaching of the folkeskole or in a teaching which is comparable to what is usually required in the folkeskole.

Compulsory education commences on 1 August of the calendar year of the child's 6th birthday, and it terminates on 31 July, when the child has received regular instruction for 10 years. At the request of the parents or with their consent, a child's education may be postponed to one year after the normal commencement of compulsory education, when such a step is justified by the child's development. A child may also – at the request of their parents, and if they are considered able to follow the instruction – be admitted before their sixth birthday.

=== Private schools ===
As of 2013, private, or free elementary, schools cater to 15.6% of students in 2004–2005 of basic school age, having risen from 12.9% of students in 2004–2005.

In the spring of 1991, the Danish Parliament adopted a new private school act, which introduced a new public grant system for private schools giving them a grant towards the operational expenditures per pupil per year, which in principle matches the corresponding public expenditures in the municipal schools - less the fees paid by the parents of the pupils in the private schools.

In 1999, the average grant towards the operational expenditures per pupil per year amounted to DKK 34,134 (US$5,500) and the average fees paid by the parents amounted to DKK 6,942 (US$1,100).

Private schools can be roughly divided into the following categories:

- Small "Grundtvigian" independent schools in rural districts.
- Religious or congregational schools, such as Catholic, Inner Mission, or Muslim schools
- Progressive free schools
- International schools such as Copenhagen International School
- Schools with a particular pedagogical objective, such as the Waldorf schools
- German minority schools

Private schools are recognised and receive government financing regardless of the ideological, religious, political, or ethnic motivation behind their establishment. Some private schools are very old, some quite new, and new ones are added all the time. It is characteristic of the private schools that they are smaller than municipal schools.

All that is demanded of private schools is that their teaching equal that of the municipal schools. The Ministry of Education confers on private schools the right to use the final examinations of the folkeskole, thereby exercising a certain extent of quality control. In principle, however, it is not up to any government authority but to the parents of each private school to check that its performance measures up to the demands set for the municipal schools.

The parents must themselves choose a supervisor to check the pupils' level of achievement in Danish, arithmetic, mathematics, and English. If the school is found inadequate, the supervisor must report it to the municipal school authority. In extraordinary circumstances, the Ministry of Education may establish special supervision, for example if there is reason to believe that the school teaches a subject so poorly that it may give the pupils problems later on in life.

Educational experts say the rise in use of private schools in the 2000s is partly due to white Danish families putting their children in private schools when the neighbouring public school gets more than 30% pupils of immigrant background. About 24% of pupils grade 1–3 in Copenhagen attend private schools. Another factor is parents in small communities who have organized to start a private school when small public schools have closed as a results of the Danish municipality reform which led to fewer municipalities.

=== Levels and age groups ===
The folkeskole consists of an obligatory pre-school class, the nine-year obligatory course and a voluntary eleventh year. It thus caters for pupils aged six to seventeen.

The comprehensive concept of the folkeskole enables students to remain in the same student group with the same classmates from the 1st to the 10th (or 11th) form, sharing the same experiences in all subjects with peers of all types of backgrounds and covering the whole range of ability.

The new act, which came into effect for the school year 1994–1995, has abolished the division of the subjects of arithmetic, mathematics, English, German, physics, and chemistry into basic and advanced level courses in the 8th to 10th forms, introducing a system of differentiated teaching, by which the teachers have to adapt their teaching to the prerequisites of the individual pupil.

=== General objectives ===
Section 1 of the Act of the Folkeskole of 1994 states that:

"The folkeskole shall — in co-operation with the parents — further the pupils' acquisition of knowledge, skills, working methods and ways of expressing themselves and thus contribute to the all-round personal development of the individual pupil.

"The folkeskole shall endeavour to create such opportunities for experience, industry and absorption that the pupils develop awareness, imagination and an urge to learn, so that they acquire confidence in their own possibilities and a background for forming independent judgements and for taking personal action.

"The folkeskole shall familiarise the pupils with Danish culture and contribute to their understanding of other cultures and of man's interaction with nature. The school shall prepare the pupils for active participation, joint responsibility, rights and duties in a society based on freedom and democracy. The teaching of the school and its daily life must therefore build on intellectual freedom, equality and democracy."

== Subjects of the folkeskole ==
The subjects taught in the folkeskole can be divided into obligatory subjects and topics offered throughout the entire period of the folkeskole and optional subjects and topics offered in the 8th to 10th years.

=== Mandatory subjects ===
The teaching in the nine-year basic school covers the following subjects which are compulsory for all pupils:

Danish, Christian studies — including in the oldest forms instruction in foreign religions and other philosophies of life, PE and sport, and mathematics during the entire nine-year period; English and history from the third to the ninth year; music from the first to the sixth year; science from the first to the sixth year; art from the first to the fifth year; social studies from the eighth to the ninth year; geography and biology from the seventh to the ninth year; physics and chemistry in the seventh to ninth year; needlework, wood- or metalworking and cooking for one or more years between the fourth and seventh year.

The instruction in the basic school furthermore comprises the following obligatory topics: traffic safety, health and sex education and family planning as well as educational, vocational and labour market orientation.

=== Optional subjects ===
The second foreign language, German or French, must be offered in the seventh to tenth years.

The following optional subjects and topics may be offered to the pupils in the eighth to tenth years: French or German as a third foreign language, word processing, technology, media, art, photography, film, drama, music, needlework, wood- or metalwork, home economics, engine knowledge, other workshop subjects, and vocational studies. Furthermore, Latin may be offered to the pupils in the tenth year.

The teaching in the 10th form comprises the following subjects as obligatory subjects: Danish, mathematics, and English to an extent corresponding to a total of 14 lessons a week (i.e. half of the minimum weekly teaching time). Instruction must be offered in PE and sport, Christian studies and religious education, social studies and physics or chemistry. Furthermore, pupils who have chosen German or French as a second foreign language in the seventh to ninth years must be offered continued instruction in that subject in the tenth year.

The pupils in the eighth to tenth years must choose at least one optional subject.

=== Subjects ===
The basic subjects are Danish, religious studies, mathematics, art, history, music, physical education, English and science. Later classes are home economics, chemistry, social studies, needlework, woodworking, physics, geography and biology.

== Pupil evaluation ==
There are two ways of carrying out evaluation in the folkeskole: continuous evaluation and evaluation through examinations.

=== Continuous evaluation ===
The students benefit from the teaching is being evaluated on a continuous basis. This evaluation forms the basis of the guidance of the individual pupil with a view to the further planning of the teaching.

In addition to the basic skills, the folkeskole is required by law to help promote the personal and social development of each individual student according to their capability. Working methods are modified towards the pupil's attainment of greater self-reliance and maturity. This aspect of pedagogic policy requires close co-operation between school and home, and an ongoing dialogue is sought between teachers, parents and pupils.

The act is very clear on this point, requiring that pupils and parents be regularly informed of the school's opinion about how each student is profiting from their schooling. In this case, regularly means at least twice a year and refers explicitly to information as to the student's personal and social development as well as his purely academic attainment.

In the first to eighth years, information is given either in writing or, more commonly, as part of conferences between all three parties: pupil, parents and class teacher – which are a regular feature of Danish school life.

In the ninth to eleventh years, the information system is increased to include a written report at least twice a year giving the pupil's standpoint in academic achievement and in application. For pupils at this level, the evaluation of the level of attainment in the individual subjects is expressed in marks.

Marks are given according to the seven-point marking scale indicating the performance of the pupil:

- 12: Excellent performance
- 10: Very good performance
- 7: Good performance
- 4: Fair performance
- 02: Adequate performance
- 00: Inadequate performance
- -3: Unacceptable performance

The last such marks are given immediately before the written examinations and express the pupils' proficiency in the subject at that particular time.

The marking scale was changed April 2007 (order by Danish ministry of Education, Order no. 262 of 20 March 2007), to be comparable to the ECTS grading scale:

- The grade 12 on the 7-point grading scale corresponds to an A on the ECTS scale
- The grade 10 on the 7-point grading scale corresponds to a B on the ECTS scale
- The grade 7 on the 7-point grading scale corresponds to a C on the ECTS scale
- The grade 4 on the 7-point grading scale corresponds to a D on the ECTS scale
- The grade 02 on the 7-point grading scale corresponds to an E on the ECTS scale
- The grade 00 on the 7-point grading scale corresponds to an Fx on the ECTS scale
- The grade -3 on the 7-point grading scale corresponds to an F on the ECTS scale

=== Examinations ===
Examinations are held at two levels: the leaving examination after the 10th and 11th year and the 11th form examination. Standard rules have been developed for all the examinations with a view to ensuring uniformity throughout the country. For the same reason, the written examination questions are set and marked at central level. Examinations are not compulsory. The pupils decide whether or not to sit for examinations in a subject upon consultation with the school, or in practice, their own teachers and their parents. But, in general 90–95% write the leaving examination after the 10th year of the folkeskole and 85–90% write the leaving examination after the 11th year.

== See also ==
- Volksschule
