= 2025 Høje-Taastrup municipal election =

Municipal election in Denmark

← 2021	18 November 2025	2029 →

All 21 seats to the Høje-Taastrup municipal council 11 seats needed for a majority
- Turnout: 26,587 (58.9%) ▲0.1%
	First party	Second party	Third party
	C	A	B
Party	Conservatives	Social Democrats	Social Liberals
Last election	11 seats, 44.6%	6 seats, 27.5%	1 seat, 4.3%
Seats won	9	4	2
Seat change	▼2	▼2	▲1
Popular vote	10,773	4,843	2,551
Percentage	41.2%	18.5%	9.8%
Swing	▼3.4%	▼9.0%	▲5.4%
	Fourth party	Fifth party	Sixth party
	O	F	Ø
Party	Danish People's Party	Green Left	Red-Green Alliance
Last election	1 seat, 4.1%	1 seat, 5.3%	1 seat, 5.7%
Seats won	2	2	1
Seat change	▲1	▲1	0
Popular vote	2,390	2,183	1,888
Percentage	9.1%	8.3%	7.2%
Swing	▲5.0%	▲3.0%	▲1.6%
	Seventh party
	I
Party	Liberal Alliance
Last election	0 seats, 1.8%
Seats won	1
Seat change	▲1
Popular vote	538
Percentage	2.1%
Swing	▲0.3%
Mayor before election
Kurt Scheelsbeck
Conservatives
Mayor after election
Michael Ziegler
Conservatives

The 2025 Høje-Taastrup Municipal election was held on November 18, 2025, to elect the 21 members to sit in the regional council for the Høje-Taastrup Municipal council, in the period of 2026 to 2029. Michael Ziegler from the Conservatives, would win the mayoral position.

== Background ==
Following the 2021 election, Michael Ziegler from Conservatives became mayor for his fifth term. He would run for a sixth term.

== Electoral system ==
For elections to Danish municipalities, a number varying from 9 to 31 are chosen to be elected to the municipal council. The seats are then allocated using the D'Hondt method and a closed list proportional representation. Høje-Taastrup Municipality had 21 seats in 2025.

== Electoral alliances ==
=== Electoral Alliance 1 ===
Party		Political alignment
A	Social Democrats	Centre-left
B	Social Liberals	Centre to Centre-left
F	Green Left	Centre-left to Left-wing
Q	Independent Greens	Left-wing
Ø	Red-Green Alliance	Left-wing to Far-Left

=== Electoral Alliance 2 ===
Party		Political alignment
C	Conservatives	Centre-right
O	Danish People's Party	Right-wing to Far-right

=== Electoral Alliance 3 ===
Party		Political alignment
I	Liberal Alliance	Centre-right to Right-wing
M	Moderates	Centre to Centre-right
V	Venstre	Centre-right

== Results by polling station ==
Division	A	B	C	F	I	M	O	Q	V	Ø
Division	%	%	%	%	%	%	%	%	%	%
Børne- og Kulturhuset	23.5	16.0	29.9	6.9	1.2	0.3	9.1	2.2	1.3	9.6
Parkskolen	17.7	9.5	45.6	7.1	0.9	0.5	9.4	0.7	1.5	7.2
Taastrup Kulturcenter	17.6	7.9	47.6	8.1	0.8	0.7	9.7	0.9	1.2	5.6
Rådhuset (Høje-Taastrup)	15.6	16.6	33.9	8.3	2.4	1.4	7.0	1.8	1.3	11.6
Hallen ved Rønnevangsstrøget	23.4	9.3	39.6	6.8	1.5	0.8	9.8	0.7	2.0	6.1
Torstorp Skole	18.5	13.5	34.0	7.3	2.2	1.1	12.2	1.0	1.0	9.3
Sengeløse	24.6	2.6	49.6	4.8	1.6	0.8	7.9	0.4	2.3	5.4
Charlotteskolen	16.4	11.8	41.9	8.9	1.5	1.3	9.3	0.4	1.4	7.1
Fløng Hallen	19.2	5.0	41.5	10.4	2.8	1.8	10.3	0.1	4.2	4.7
Reerslev Skole	11.2	3.4	55.6	8.3	2.5	1.4	8.1	0.0	2.4	7.1
Springcenter Nærheden	14.3	8.0	43.1	12.1	4.6	1.4	7.2	0.4	2.1	6.9

== Results ==
Party		Votes	%	+/-	Seats	+/-
Høje-Taastrup Municipality
C	Conservatives	10,773	41.20	-3.39	9	-2
A	Social Democrats	4,843	18.52	-9.00	4	-2
B	Social Liberals	2,551	9.75	+5.44	2	+1
O	Danish People's Party	2,390	9.14	+5.03	2	+1
F	Green Left	2,183	8.35	+3.04	2	+1
Ø	Red-Green Alliance	1,888	7.22	+1.55	1	0
I	Liberal Alliance	538	2.06	+0.28	1	+1
V	Venstre	496	1.90	-1.09	0	0
M	Moderates	279	1.07	New	0	New
Q	Independent Greens	210	0.80	New	0	New
Total		26,151	100	N/A	21	N/A
Invalid votes		129	0.29	-0.11		
Blank votes		307	0.68	+0.19		
Turnout		26,587	58.90	+0.10		
Source: valg.dk

== Opinion polls ==
Polling firm	Fieldwork date	Sample size	C	A	Ø	F	B	O	V	I	M	Q	Others	Lead
Epinion	4 Sep - 13 Oct 2025	494	49.8	19.6	4.3	9.5	1.6	7.2	2.1	4.6	1.0	–	0.2	30.2
2024 european parliament election	9 Jun 2024		11.6	17.5	8.7	15.4	6.8	8.8	11.6	6.5	6.0	–	–	2.1
2022 general election	1 Nov 2022		8.7	29.4	4.5	8.4	4.2	4.3	9.1	6.7	9.3	3.5	–	20.1
2021 regional election	16 Nov 2021		26.7	31.8	6.1	6.2	5.3	5.3	7.4	2.2	–	–	–	5.1
2021 municipal election	16 Nov 2021		44.6 (11)	27.5 (6)	5.7 (1)	5.3 (1)	4.3 (1)	4.1 (1)	3.0 (0)	1.8 (0)	–	–	–	17.1
