= 2021 Høje-Taastrup municipal election =

← 2017	16 November 2021	2025 →

All 21 seats to the Høje-Taastrup Municipal Council 11 seats needed for a majority
- Turnout: 23,984 (58.8%) ▼7.0pp
	First party	Second party	Third party
	C	A	Ø
Party	Conservatives	Social Democrats	Red–Green Alliance
Last election	12 seats, 47.6%	5 seats, 24.3%	1 seat, 4.6%
Seats won	11	6	1
Seat change	▼1	▲1	0
Popular vote	10,509	6,485	1,336
Percentage	44.6%	27.5%	5.7%
Swing	▼3.0%	▲3.2%	▲1.1%
	Fourth party	Fifth party	Sixth party
	F	B	O
Party	Green Left	Social Liberals	Danish People's Party
Last election	0 seats, 3.5%	1 seat, 2.8%	1 seat, 7.7%
Seats won	1	1	1
Seat change	▲1	0	0
Popular vote	1,251	1,018	968
Percentage	5.3%	4.3%	4.1%
Swing	▲1.8%	▲1.5%	▼3.6%
Mayor before election
Michael Ziegler
Conservatives
Mayor after election
Michael Ziegler
Conservatives

Since Michael Ziegler from the Conservatives became mayor following the 2005 election, he had held it.

In the 2017 election he would even lead his party to an absolute majority, with 12 seats. He would eventually become the mayor.

In this election, the Conservatives would lose a seat, but still have an absolute majority. Therefore, once again, Michael Ziegler was set to become mayor, and this would be his 4th term.

== Electoral system ==
For elections to Danish municipalities, a number varying from 9 to 31 are chosen to be elected to the municipal council. The seats are then allocated using the D'Hondt method and a closed list proportional representation. Høje-Taastrup Municipality had 21 seats in 2021

Unlike in Danish General Elections, in elections to municipal councils, electoral alliances are allowed.

== Electoral alliances ==
=== Electoral Alliance 1 ===
Party		Political alignment
B	Social Liberals	Centre to Centre-left
I	Liberal Alliance	Centre-right to Right-wing

=== Electoral Alliance 2 ===
Party		Political alignment
C	Conservatives	Centre-right
D	New Right	Right-wing to Far-right
O	Danish People's Party	Right-wing to Far-right
V	Venstre	Centre-right

=== Electoral Alliance 3 ===
Party		Political alignment
A	Social Democrats	Centre-left
F	Green Left	Centre-left to Left-wing
Ø	Red–Green Alliance	Left-wing to Far-Left
Å	The Alternative	Centre-left to Left-wing

== Results by polling station ==
Division	A	B	C	D	F	I	O	V	Ø	Å
Division	%	%	%	%	%	%	%	%	%	%
Ole Rømer-Skolen	34.1	9.5	34.0	2.8	5.3	0.6	4.1	1.9	6.5	1.2
Parkskolen	26.5	3.7	50.4	2.0	4.2	1.7	4.3	1.9	4.5	0.8
Taastrup Kulturcenter	24.3	2.7	52.9	2.4	5.3	1.2	4.9	2.1	3.7	0.5
Rådhuset	27.2	10.3	37.1	3.5	7.5	1.5	2.9	1.5	7.2	1.1
Hallen ved Rønnevangsstrøget	29.7	3.4	45.0	2.6	4.6	1.9	4.4	2.2	5.2	1.1
Torstorp Skole	29.9	5.9	38.4	3.9	5.6	1.9	4.2	2.1	7.1	1.0
Sengeløse	34.7	1.0	40.6	3.7	3.3	1.6	4.4	4.4	5.5	0.7
Charlotteskolen	25.2	3.1	47.4	2.5	6.2	1.9	3.5	3.1	6.2	1.0
Reerslev Skole	21.9	2.6	43.8	3.3	6.6	3.3	3.5	5.1	9.5	0.5
Fløng Hallen	25.1	2.2	45.1	3.0	4.6	2.7	4.4	7.0	5.3	0.7

== Results ==
Party		Votes	%	+/-	Seats	+/-
Høje-Taastrup Municipality
C	Conservatives	10,509	44.59	-3.05	11	-1
A	Social Democrats	6,485	27.52	+3.20	6	+1
Ø	Red-Green Alliance	1,336	5.67	+1.08	1	0
F	Green Left	1,251	5.31	+1.85	1	+1
B	Social Liberals	1,018	4.32	+1.51	1	0
O	Danish People's Party	968	4.11	-3.59	1	0
V	Venstre	703	2.98	-0.15	0	0
D	New Right	671	2.85	New	0	New
I	Liberal Alliance	419	1.78	+0.99	0	0
Å	The Alternative	208	0.88	-1.42	0	0
Total		23,568	100	N/A	21	N/A
Invalid votes		163	0.40	+0.09		
Blank votes		253	0.62	+0.06		
Turnout		23,984	58.81	-6.98		
Source: valg.dk
