= Hedehusene railway station =

Railway station in Greater Copenhagen, Denmark

Hedehusene
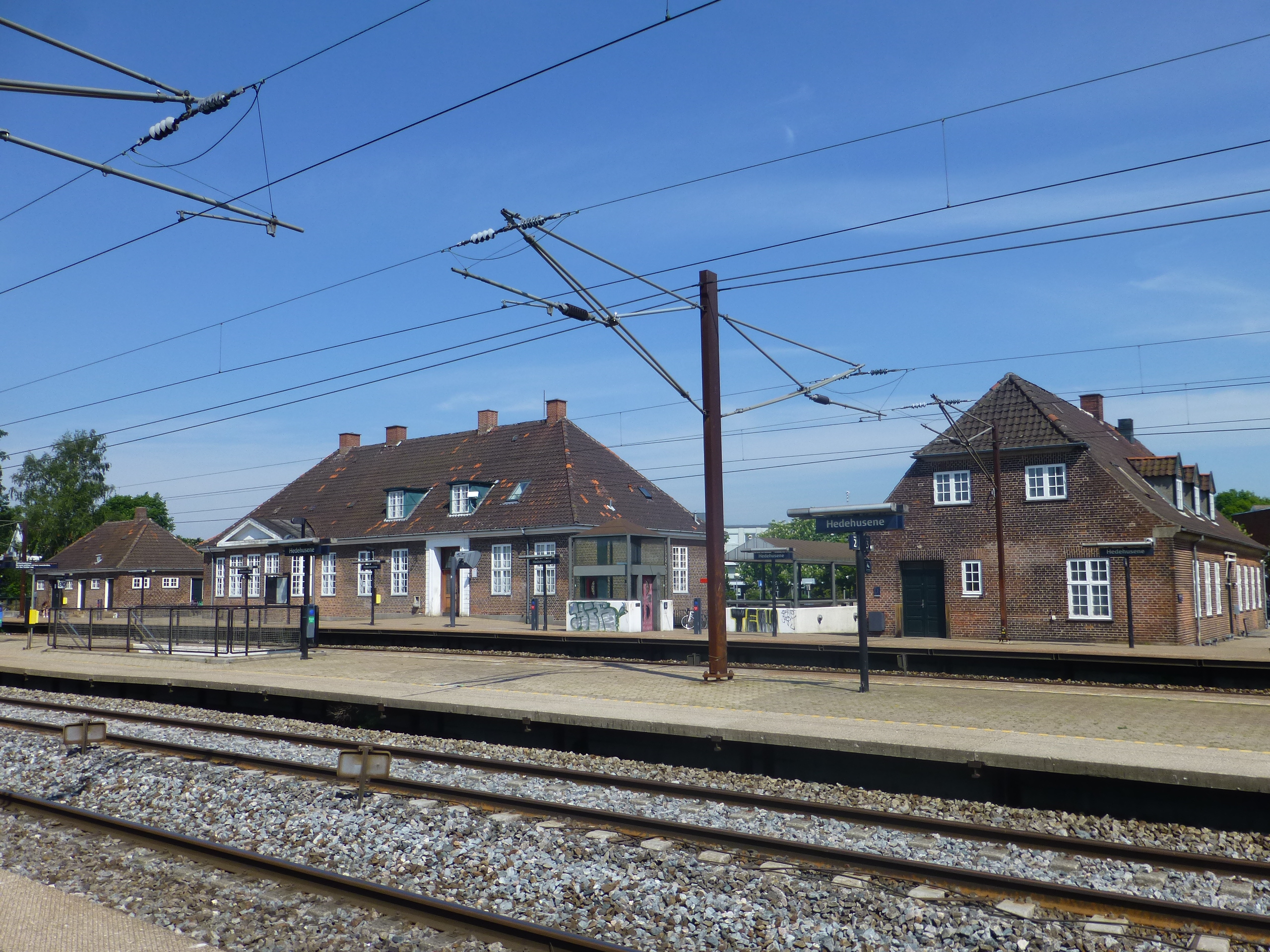
- Hedehusene station in 2014

General information
- Location: Hovedgaden 437; 2640 Hedehusene; Høje-Taastrup Municipality; Denmark
- Coordinates: 55°38′55″N 12°11′51″E
- Elevation: 33.0 m (108.3 ft)
- Owner: DSB (station infrastructure); Banedanmark (rail infrastructure)
- Line: Copenhagen–Fredericia/Taulov Line
- Platforms: 2 side platforms 1 island platform
- Tracks: 4
- Train operators: DSB

Construction
- Structure type: At-grade
- Cycle facilities: Bicycle parking station
- Accessible: Partly
- Architect: Heinrich Wenck (1917)

Other information
- Station code: Hh
- Website: Official website

History
- Opened: 27 June 1847
- Rebuilt: 1917

Services
Preceding station	DSB	Following station
Høje Taastrup towards Helsingør	Elsinore–Copenhagen– Roskilde–Næstved Regional train	Trekroner towards Næstved
Høje Taastrup towards Helsingør	Elsinore–Copenhagen– Roskilde–Holbæk Regional train	Trekroner towards Holbæk
Location

Hedehusene railway station is a railway station serving the railway town of Hedehusene, a suburban town of Copenhagen in Zealand, Denmark. It is situated in the centre of the town, immediately adjacent to Hedehusene's bus station, and where the railway line crosses Hedehusene's main artery, Hovedgaden, a part of the old highway between Copenhagen and Roskilde.

The station is located on the Copenhagen–Fredericia railway line between Copenhagen and Roskilde. It opened in 1847 with the opening of the Copenhagen-Roskilde railway line, the first railway line in the Kingdom of Denmark. It offers direct regional train services to Copenhagen and Roskilde. The train services are operated by the national railway company DSB.

== History ==
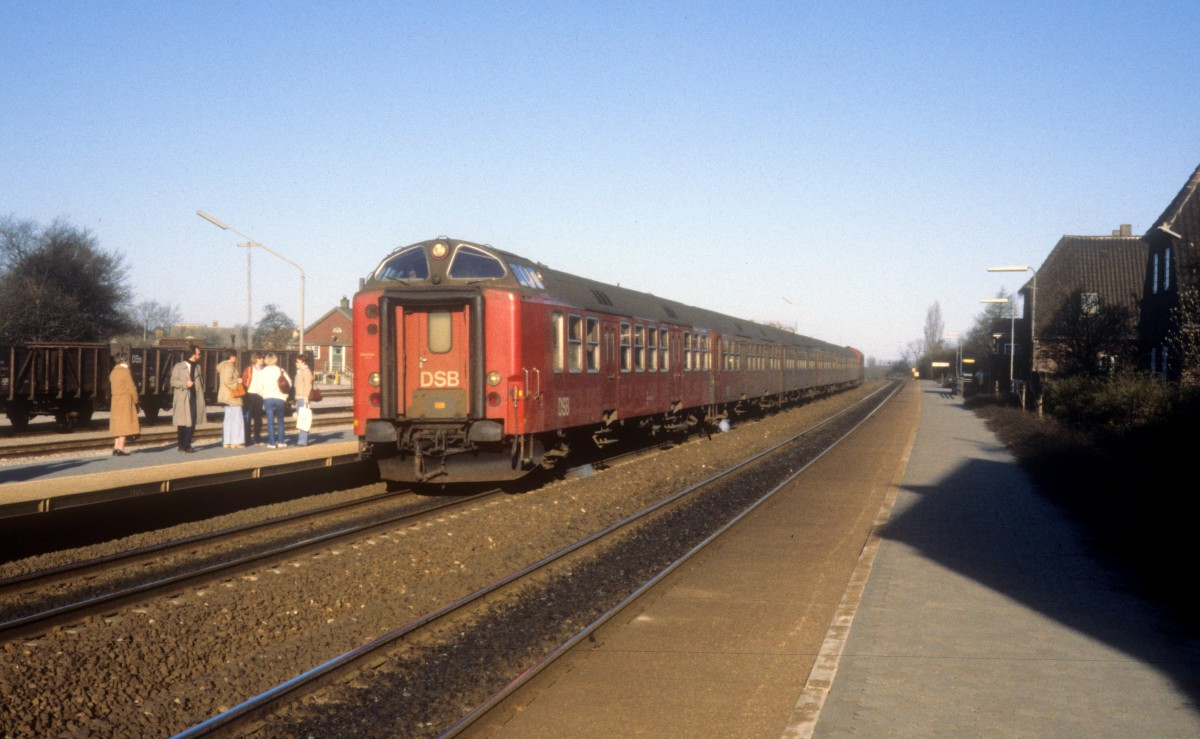
DSB regional train to Copenhagen calling at Hedehusene in 1981

Hedehusene station opened on 27 June 1847 as one of the original intermediate stops on the new railway line from Copenhagen to Roskilde, the first railway line in the Kingdom of Denmark (Note: The first railway line in the then Danish Monarchy was the Kiel-Altona railway line in the Duchy of Holstein which had been completed three years earlier. However, the Duchy of Holstein was later lost to the Kingdom of Prussia after the Second Schleswig War in 1864, and that railway line is today part of the German rail network.). The railway line was completed for Det Sjællandske Jernbaneselskab (English: the Zealand Railway Company) by British engineering company William Radford.

The station originally opened as a railway halt in a sparsely populated area where the railway line crossed the highway between Copenhagen and Roskilde. From the 1870s, considerable development of the area took place and a railway town developed around the railway halt which was promoted to a railway station in 1880.

== Architecture ==
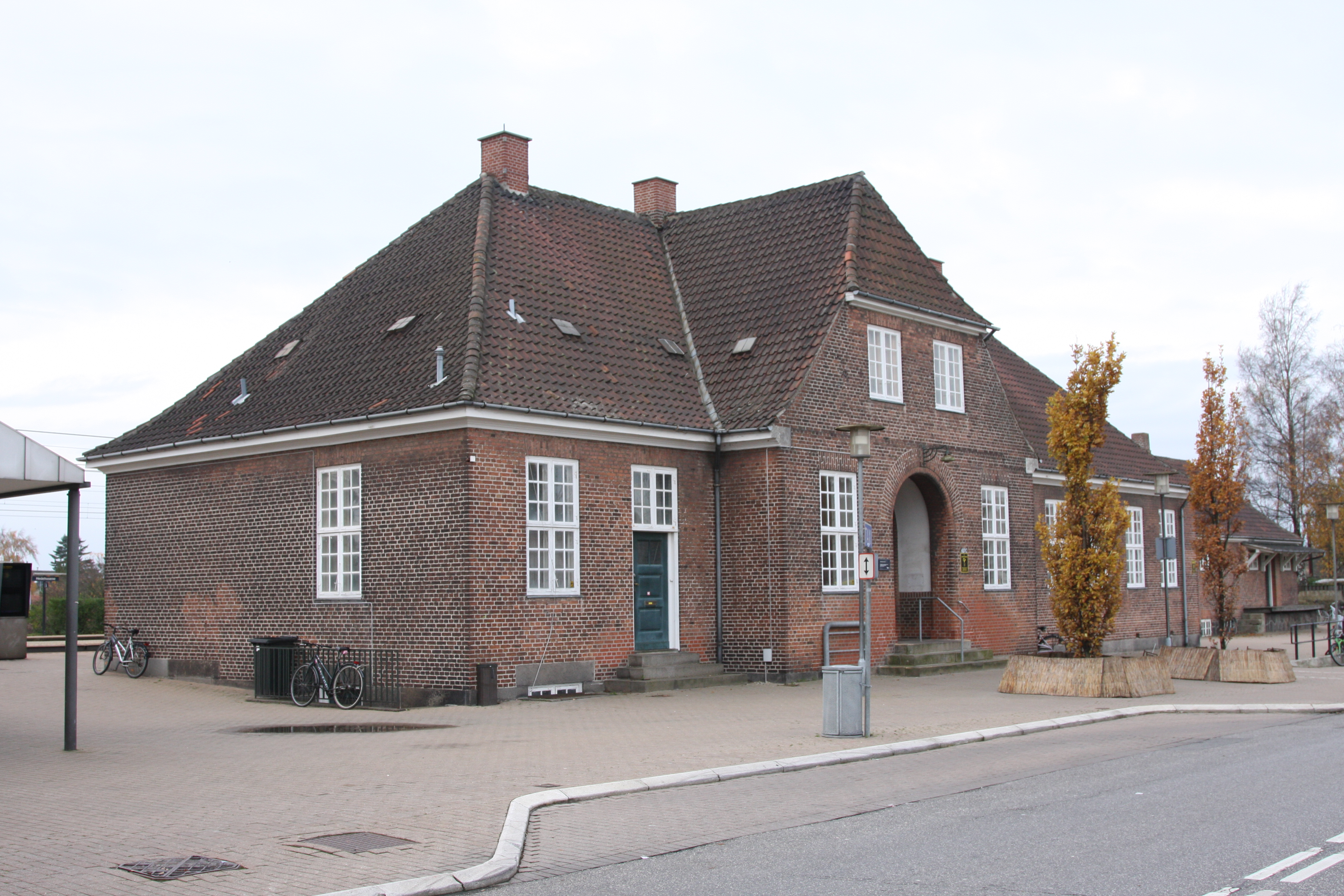
The station building in 2008

In 1917, the old station building was demolished and replaced by the station's current station building. It was built to designs by Danish architect Heinrich Wenck (1851–1936), known for the numerous railway stations he designed across Denmark in his capacity of head architect of the Danish State Railways from 1894 to 1921. The new station was inspired by the movement Bedre Byggeskik (English: Better Building Practices). According to the principles of the movement, it is built with simple materials and good craftsmanship, and with a homely and practical expression.

== Operations ==
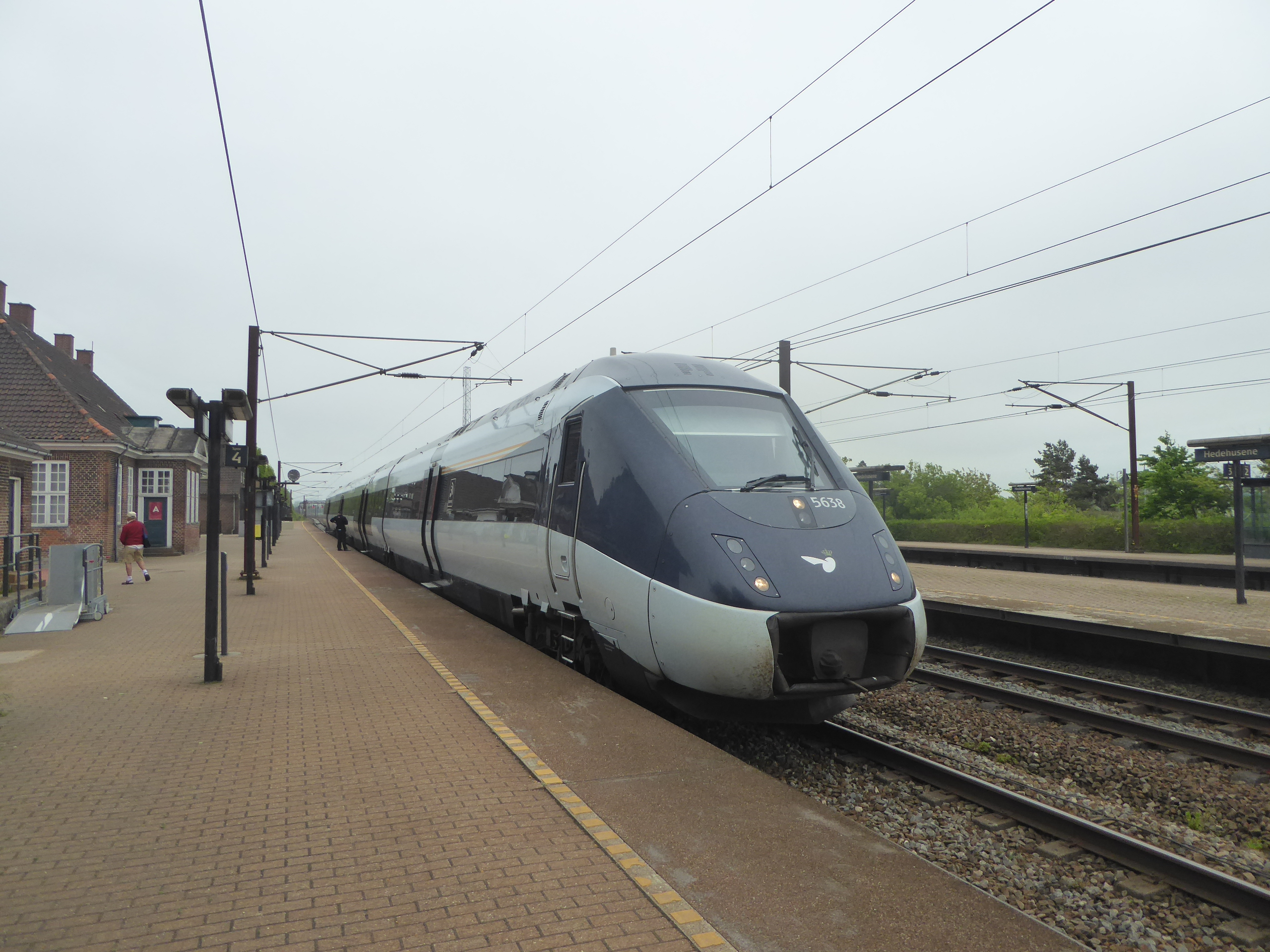
DSB IC4-train calling at Hedehusene in 2017

The train services are operated by the national railway company DSB. The station offers regional train services to Copenhagen, Elsinore, and Roskilde.

== Cultural references ==
=== In visual art ===
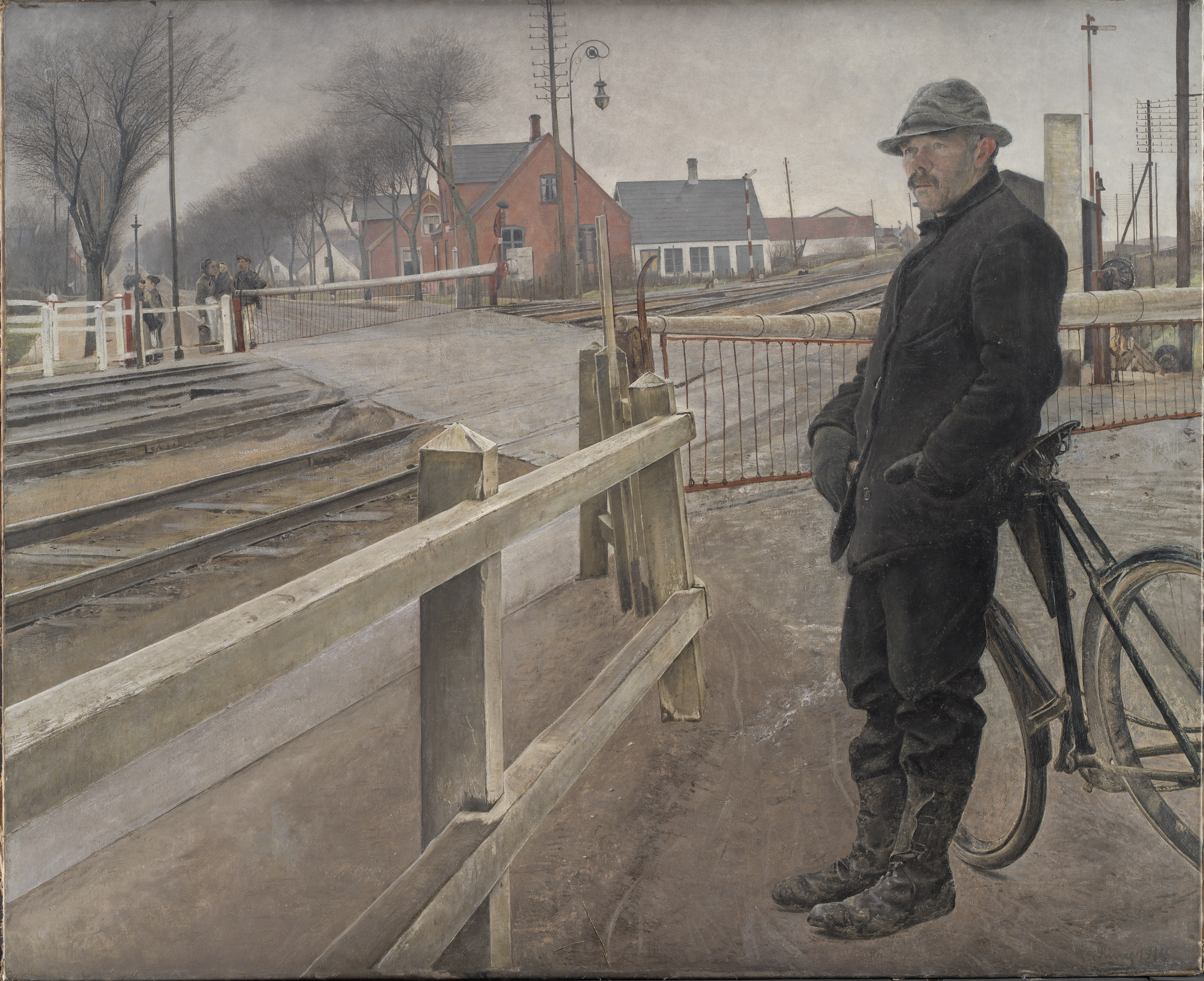
While waiting for the train. Painting by L. A. Ring, 1914.

The level crossing of the Copenhagen–Roskilde railway line and Roskilde Landevej at Hedehusene station is the motive of the 1914 painting Når toget ventes (English: While waiting for the train) by the Danish painter L. A. Ring, one of the foremost Danish painters of the turn of the 20th century, who pioneered both symbolism and social realism in Denmark.

== See also ==
- List of railway stations in Denmark
- Rail transport in Denmark
- History of rail transport in Denmark
