= Trekroner =

Area of Roskilde, Denmark

Coordinates: 55°38′59″N 12°7′22″E

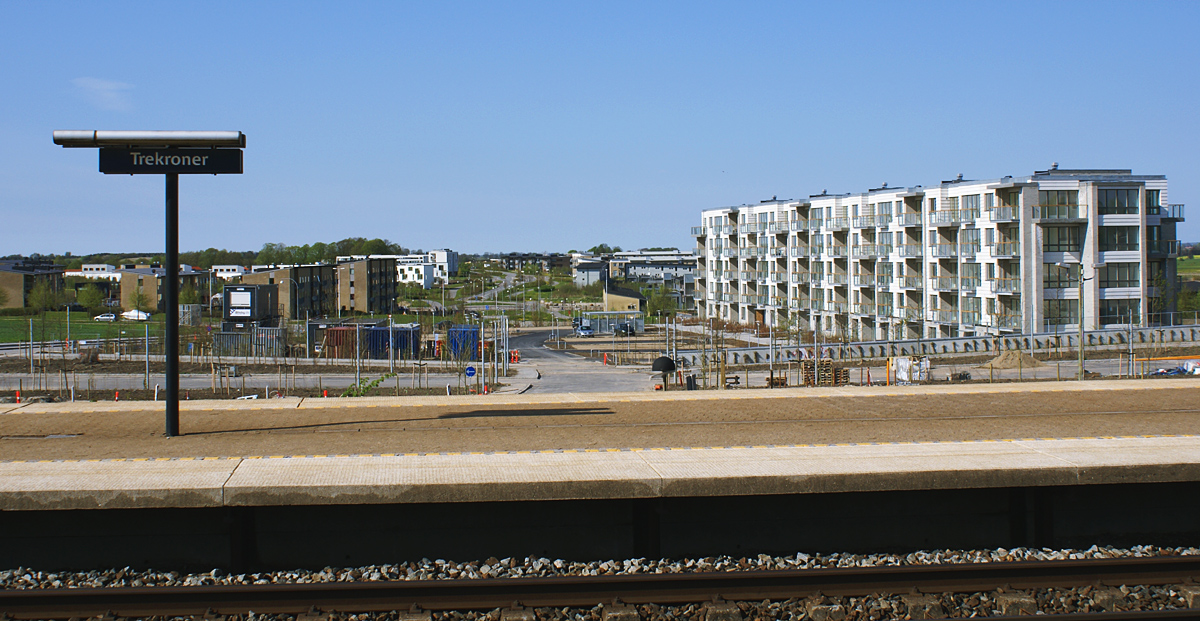
Trekroner, seen from the railway station.

Trekroner is a district in the north-eastern outskirts of Roskilde on the Danish island of Zealand.

The Trekroner district has been a major growth area of the city, expanding in the fields surrounding the campus of Roskilde University. Since 2000, many new homes have been built, contributing to an overall planned total of some 3,500 houses. Although Trekroner featured as a development area in Roskilde's future planning back in 1947, it was not until 1972 that the university was established there. In 1988, Trekroner railway station, which had first been built for the industrial area to the south, was expanded to serve the students. The new housing estate known as Trekroner West (Trekroner Vest) was specified in urban development plans in the mid-1990s. It covered a total area of around 2.4 km^{2} (0.93 sq mi) divided up into 21 development units for housing, and facilities for up to 5,000 university employees and 15,000 students.
