= Trekroner railway station =

Railway station in Roskilde, Denmark

Trekroner
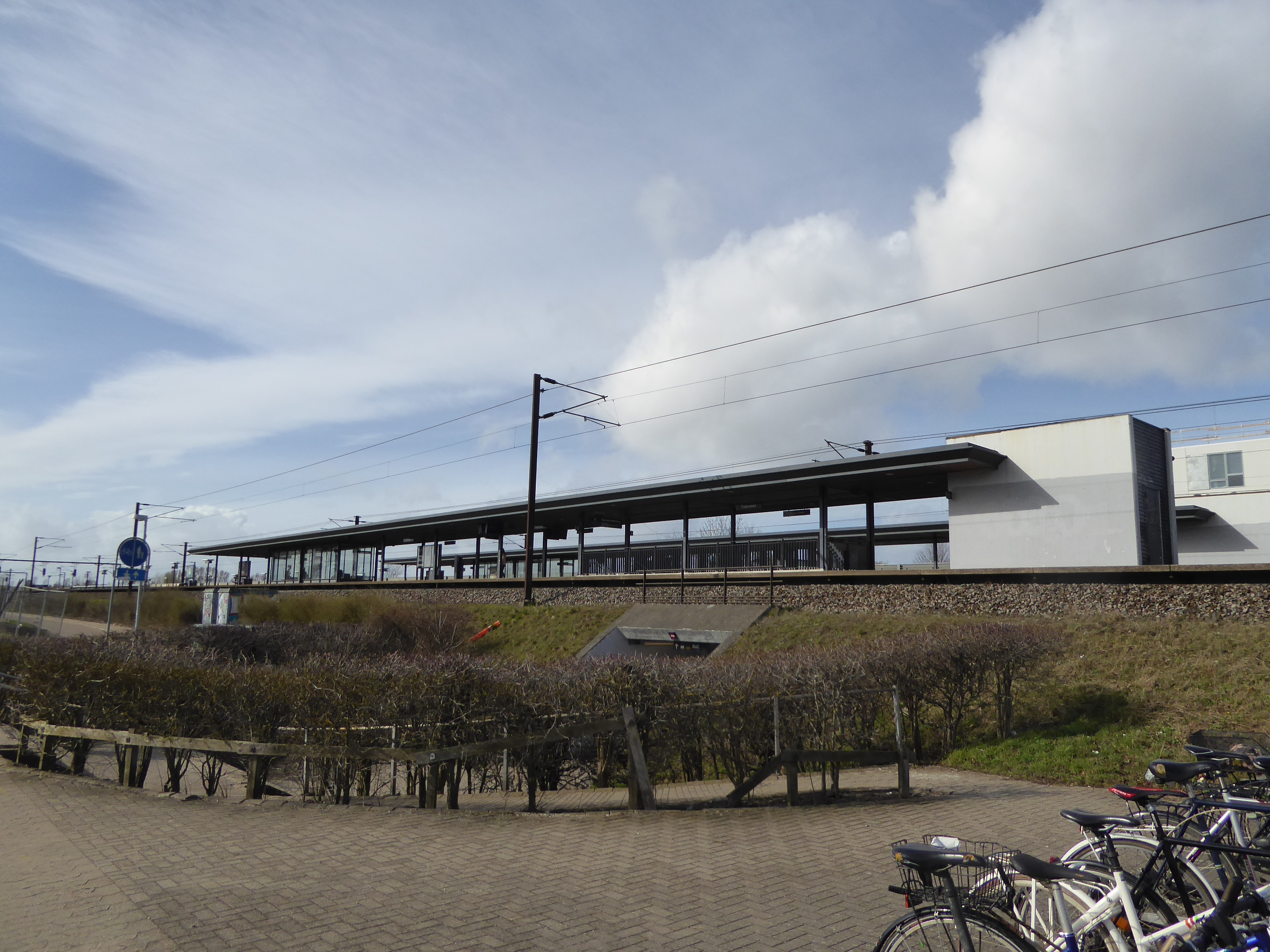
- Trekroner station in 2019

General information
- Location: Trekronervej 20; 4000 Roskilde; Roskilde Municipality; Denmark
- Coordinates: 55°38′52″N 12°7′55″E
- Elevation: 38.7 metres (127 ft)
- Owner: DSB (station infrastructure); Banedanmark (rail infrastructure)
- Line: Copenhagen–Fredericia/Taulov Line
- Platforms: 2 island platforms
- Tracks: 4
- Train operators: DSB

History
- Opened: 28 May 1988

Services
| Preceding station | DSB | Following station |
|---|---|---|
| Hedehusene towards Helsingør | Elsinore–Copenhagen– Roskilde–Næstved Regional train | Roskilde towards Næstved |
| Hedehusene towards Helsingør | Elsinore–Copenhagen– Roskilde–Holbæk Regional train | Roskilde towards Holbæk |
| Høje Taastrup towards Copenhagen Airport | Copenhagen–Slagelse Regional train | Roskilde towards Slagelse |
Location

Trekroner railway station is a railway station serving the district of Trekroner in the north-eastern outskirts of the city of Roskilde in Zealand, Denmark. The station serves the developing district of Trekroner, as well as the nearby campus of Roskilde University.

The station is located on the Copenhagen–Fredericia railway line between Copenhagen and Roskilde. It opened in 1988 to serve the nearby campus of Roskilde University which had opened in 1972. It offers direct regional train services to Copenhagen and Roskilde. The train services are operated by the national railway company DSB.

== History ==
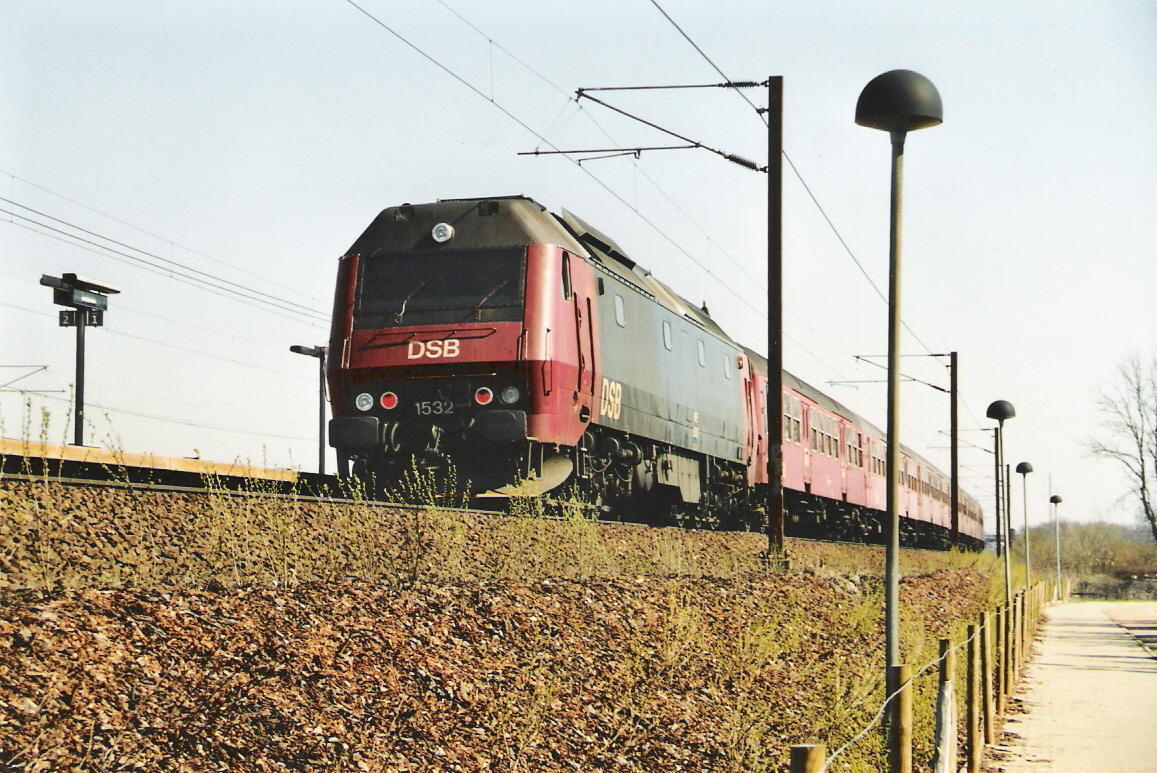
DSB regional train to Copenhagen calling at Trekroner in 2002.

Trekroner station opened east of Roskilde on 28 May 1988 on the railway line between Copenhagen and Roskilde, which had opened in 1847. Although the Trekroner area featured as a development area in Roskilde's future planning back in 1947, it was not until 1972 that the university was established there. In 1988, Trekroner railway station opened to serve the students. Since 2000, many new homes have been built in the area.

== Operations ==
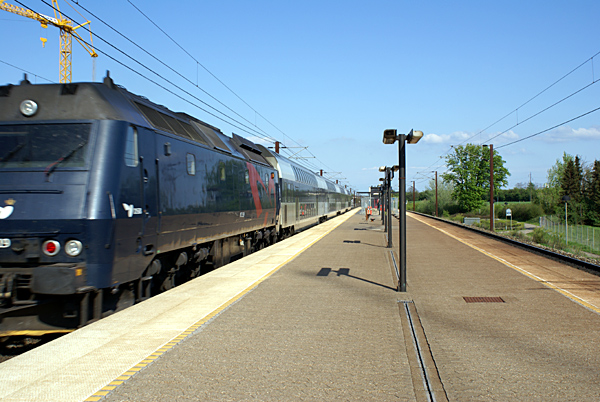
DSB-train calling at Trekroner in 2008.

The train services are operated by the national railway company DSB. The station offers regional train services to Copenhagen, Elsinore, and Roskilde.

== See also ==
- List of railway stations in Denmark
- Rail transport in Denmark
