= Kallerup Stone =

Coordinates: 55.6494°N 12.2077°E

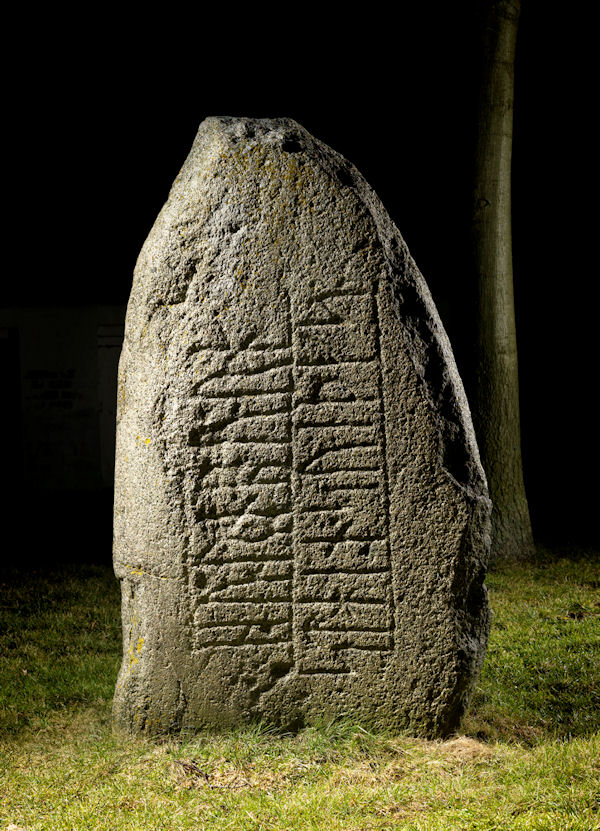
The Kallerup Stone is located in Hedehusene, Denmark.

The Kallerup Stone, designated as runic inscription DR 250 in the Rundata system, is a memorial runestone which is located in Hedehusene, Høje-Taastrup Municipality, on the island of Zealand in eastern Denmark. It is among the oldest runestones in Denmark.

== Description ==
The Kallerup Stone was discovered in 1827 by a stonemason in a field with several stone circles near a church in Hedehusene. It was then restored in 1851 by raising it near its original position. This granite runestone, which is 1.6 meters in height, is among the oldest in Denmark and is believed to date from about 700 to 800 CE. The early younger futhark (Helnæs-Gørlev form) inscription is somewhat unusual in that it uses text bands, the inscribed lines above and below the runic text, which is a practice that did not become common on runestones until later with the use of the younger futhark. The Kallerup Stone is classified as being carved in runestone style RAK, which is considered to be the oldest classification. This is the classification for inscriptions where the ends of the runic text bands are straight and without any attached dragon or serpent heads. The runestone is known locally as the Kallerupstenen.

In the runic inscription, the name Hornbora translates as "horn-bearer."

== Inscription ==
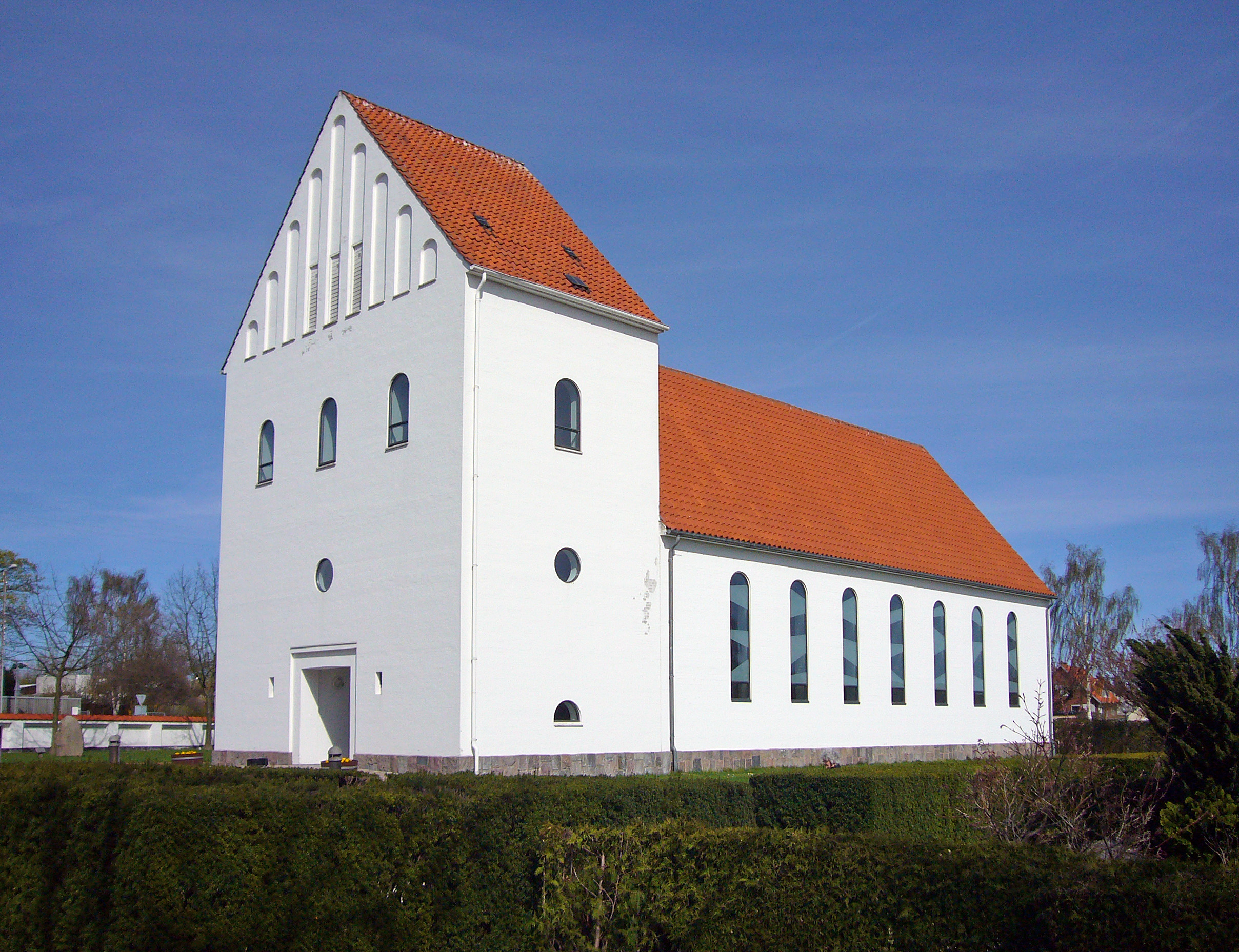
The Ansgar church in Hedehusene showing the location of the runestone (to the left of the church).

=== Transliteration of the runes into Latin characters ===
HurnburA ¶ stAin * suiþks :

=== Transcription into Old Norse ===
Hornbora steinn Sviðings.

=== Translation in English ===
Hornbori's stone, of Sviði's line.
