= Reerslev Church =

Church building in Høje-Taastrup Municipality, Denmark

Coordinates: 55°37′21.4″N 12°11′7.6″E

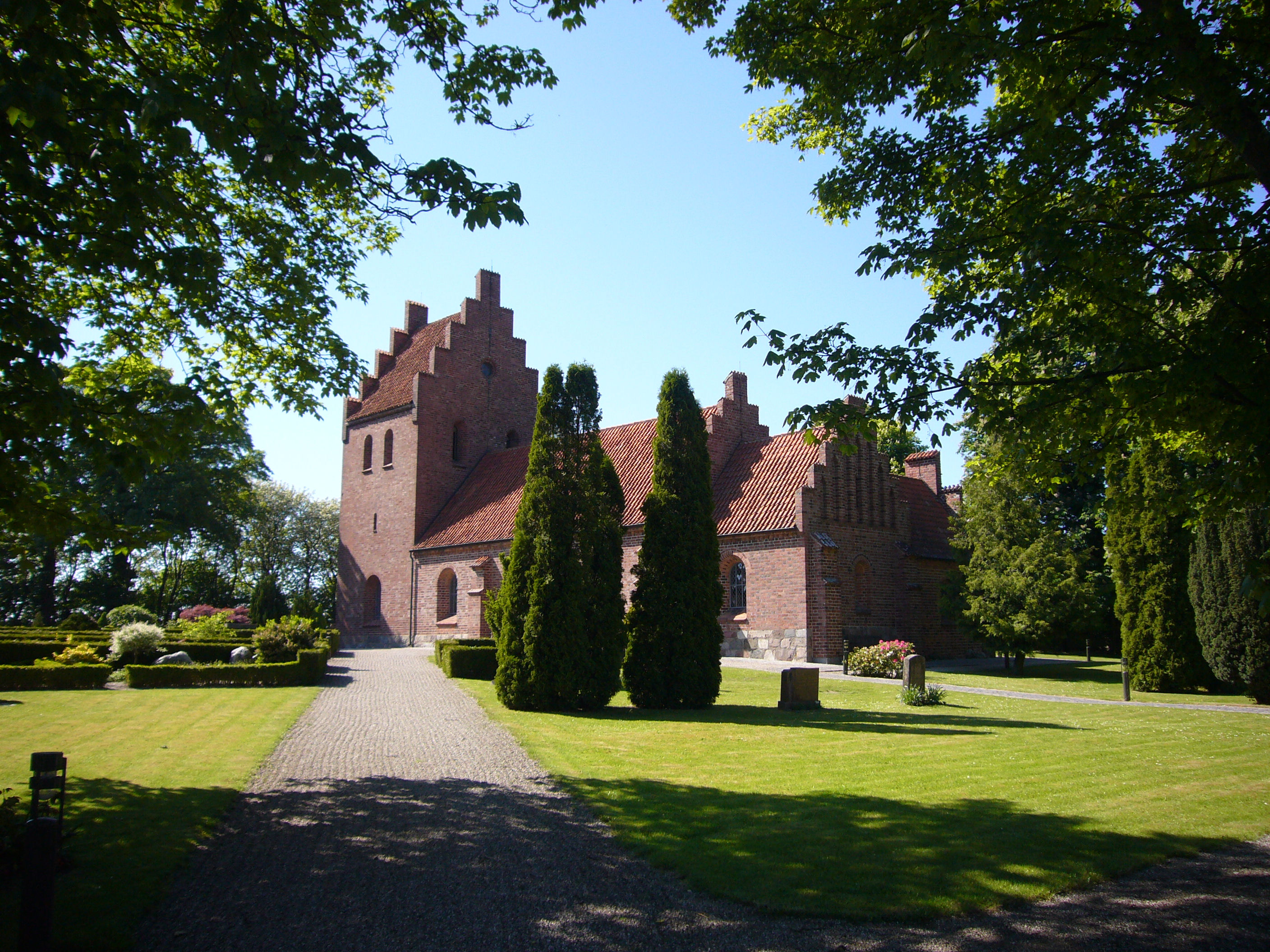
Reerslev Church

Reerslev Church lies in the village of Reerslev, adjacent to Høje-Taastrup near Roskilde in Denmark. It has a number of interesting frescos or kalkmalerier painted by artists from the Isefjord school.

== History ==
The oldest parts of the nave and the chancel date back to the 12th century and are in the Romanesque style. In the 15th century, a chapel, a vestry and an extension of the nave to the west were added in the late-Gothic style. Cross vaults were also added during this period.

== Frescos ==
The cross vaults were decorated by the Isefjord school around 1450. After the Reformation, they were covered with limewash for centuries until they were uncovered and partly restored by Jacob Kornerup in 1873.

They present pictures of Christ's birth, the Three Kings, children being killed under Herod's orders, the flight to Egypt and the arrival in Jerusalem on Palm Sunday. There are also scenes of the Last Supper, Jesus praying in Gethsemane, Pilot washing his hands, the Crucifixion and the Resurrection.

== Altar and pulpit ==
The church's altar with its panels from 1590 and the pulpit from 1609 are also of interest.

== See also ==
- Church frescos in Denmark
