= Reerslev =

- Village
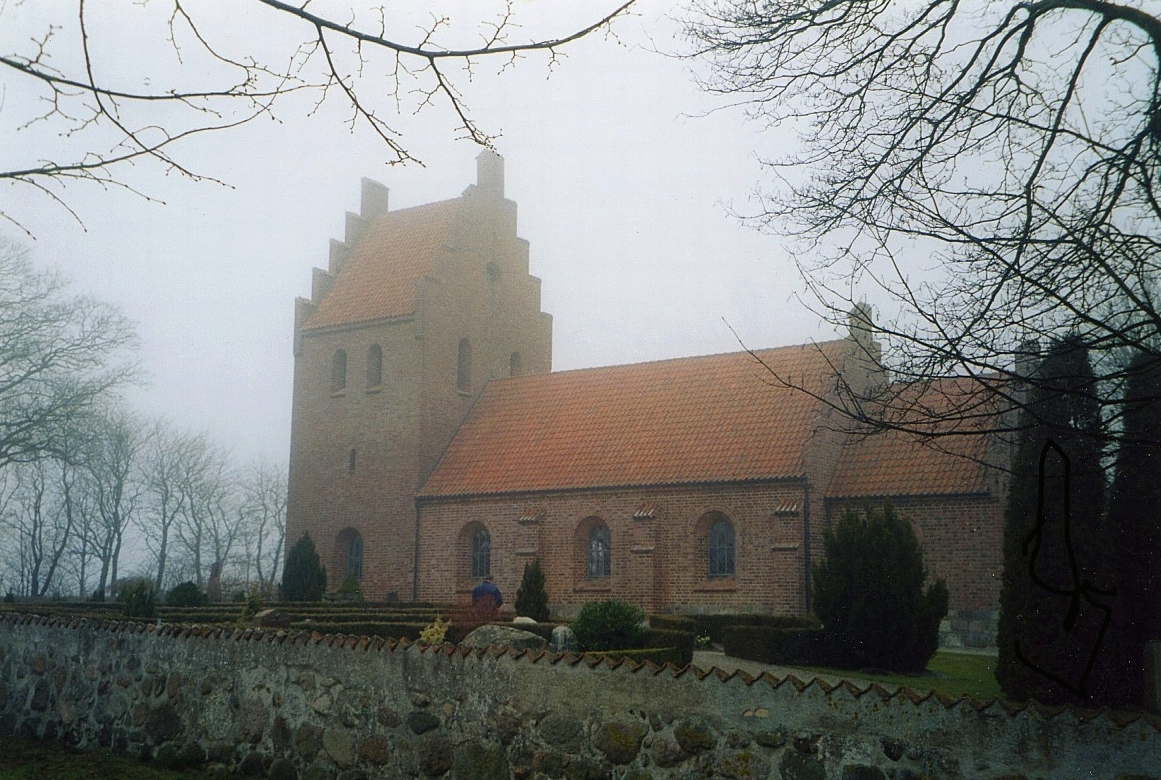
- Reerslev Church

- Location within Denmark Location within Capital Region
- Coordinates: 55°37′20″N 12°11′19″E
- Country: Denmark
- Region: Capital (Hovedstaden)
- Municipality: Høje-Taastrup

Population (2026)
  - Urban: 721

Reerslev is a town in the Høje-Taastrup Municipality in northeast Zealand, Denmark. It is located 3.5 kilometers south of Hedehusene, 3.5 kilometers north of Tune and 27 kilometers west of Copenhagen. As of 2026, it has a population of 721.
