= Roskildevej =

Road between Copenhagen and Roskilde, Denmark

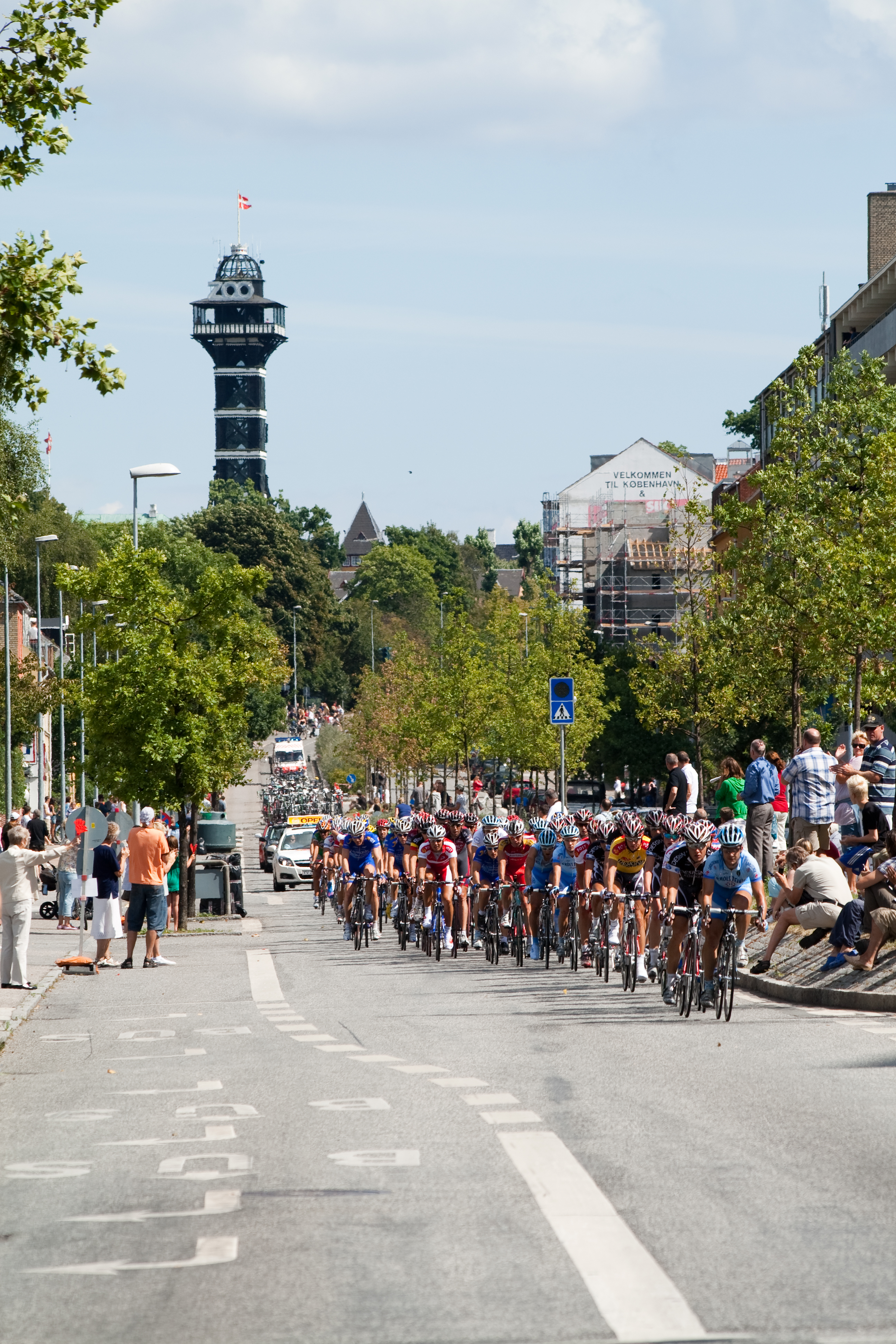
Roskildevej with the Zoo Tower during 2008 Post Danmark Rundt

Roskildevej is a road between Copenhagen and Roskilde in the Danish capital area. The direct continuation of Vesterbrogade, which begins at Copenhagen's City Hall Square, the road begins at Pile Allé and continues through Frederiksberg, Valby, Rødovre, Glostrup, Albertslund, Taastrup and Hedehusene to Roskilde. The section between Hedehusene and Roskilde is now known as Københavnsvej and in Hedehusene and Glostrup it is simply known as Hovedgaden ("Main Street").

The section from Aalholm Plads in Copenhagen to The Eastern Ring Road in Roskilde (part of Primary Route 6) is known as Secondary Route 156 and is 24 km long. The total distance from Copenhagen City Hall Square to Algade in Roskilde is about 31 km.

== History ==
The road was constructed as a replacement for the old Via Regia between Copenhagen and Roskilde. Construction began at the Roskilde end in 1770 and was completed in Copenhagen in 1776. The project was led by the French road engineer Jean Marmillod who had been called to Copenhagen by Prime Minister Count Johann Hartwig Ernst von Bernstorff in 1753 to improve the road.

Glostrup and Hedehusene remained the only towns along the road until the 1960s.

== Buildings ==
In Frederiksberg, Roskildevej passes Frederiksberg Palace and Copenhagen Zoo where the Zoo Tower is visible from the road. At Pelargonievej, there is a neighbourhood of single family detached housing which dates from the 1890s.

In Taastrup, the National Romantic Taastrup Water Tower from 1908 in visible from the road. It is now open to the public as a watchtower.

== Cultural references ==
On the Olsen-banden film The Olsen Gang in Jutland, the Olsen Gang is seen driving out of Roskildevej and stops at the petrol station at Roskildevej 310 (0:10:19).
