= Taastrup Water Tower =

Water tower in Copenhagen, Denmark

Coordinates: 55.6482°N 12.2977°E

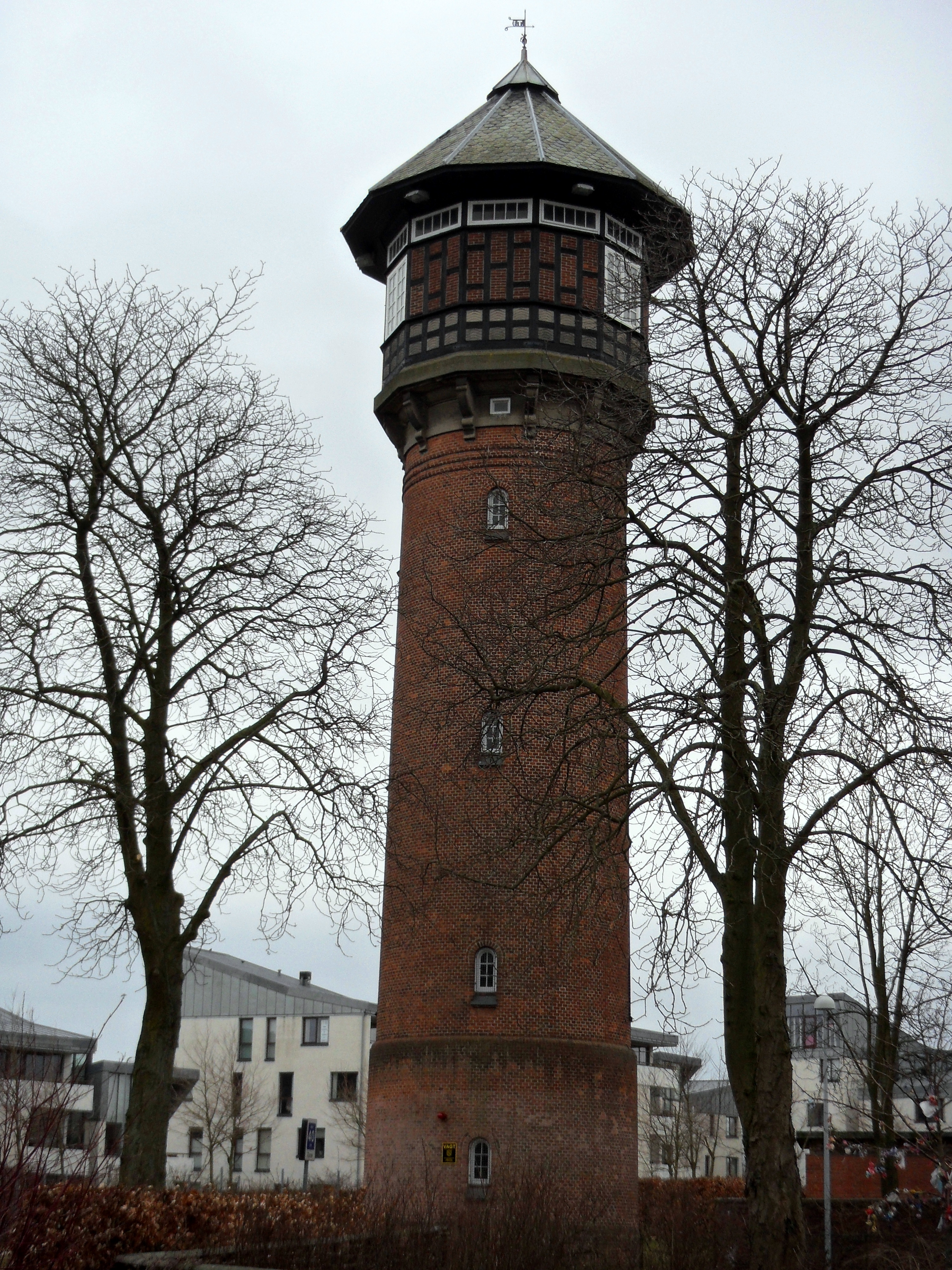
Taastrup Water tower

Taastrup Water Tower is a defunct water tower in Taastrup, a western suburb of Copenhagen, Denmark. The distinctive structure now serves as an observation tower and local landmark, readily visible when approaching Copenhagen from the west along Roskildevej.

== History ==
The water tower was built in 1908 to a design by the architect Andreas Fussing as part of the local Taastrup waterworks. In 1977 it was considered to demolish the structure but instead it was decided to renovate it. The rest of the buildings at the site were demolished in 1997 but the water tower was once again spared.

A society for the preservation of the water tower was founded in 2003. They raised funds for another renovation of the building and in 2009 it opened its doors to the public as an Observation tower. It is open the first Saturday every month from April through October from 11-13.

== Architecture ==
The water tower is designed in the National Romantic style with inspiration from Medieval architecture. Built in a red brick, the cylindrical tower stands 32 metres high and has a diameter of 6 metres at its base. The uppermost part has timber framing. On three sides, four windows, arranged one over the other, provides natural light for the internal staircase.
