= Fort Stevns =

German-Danish artillery battery in Zealand, Denmark

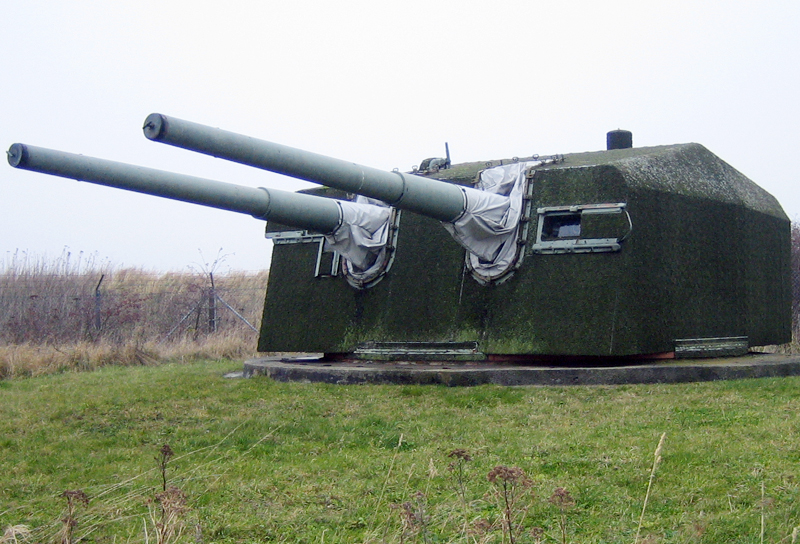
One of the dual-barreled 15cm guns from Gneisenau.

Fort Stevns is a Danish fortification located on the island of Zealand in Southern Denmark. The site of the fort originally contained a battery of guns from the Nazi German battle-crusier Gneisenau, as well as a battery of illumination guns. The Danish built over the German battery and installed several naval gun turrets to control the Øresund Strait, which is not very wide. Today, the fort is a museum.

== Description ==
The single 15cm gun used for firing illumination shells.

An armored door leading into the ammo shelter, the charge and shell were dispensed in separate pieces as shown.

The task of Fort Stevns was to block the Oresund Strait at its most narrow, as well as keep possibly hostile vessels at a safe distance from Copenhagen. It also had the purpose of protecting the minefields against minesweepers, and shelling the possible landing site of Faxe Bay. The Danes had no experience in building modern fortifications, so they copied many naval batteries in the Dover straits from their NATO ally Britain. The total length of the tunnels in and below the fort total nearly 1.7km, including rooms. The battery was armed with 2 dual-gunned 15cm turrets. These had a range of 23km, and could reach the Swedish coast. The guns could turn 360 degrees so that they could fire rearwards in case of an enemy landing or parachute drop. The 2 entrances to the fort are located along the seashore, so that the rock excavated could be poured directly into the sea.

Defused 15cm shells for the guns, this picture was taken on Oct. 19, 2019.

Fort Stevns was equipped with a retractable radar dish that could be lowered underground for protection. There were 2 fire control posts, a main one with a periscope, and another with a periscope. There was also a light anti-aircraft battery, and the 15cm which were connected to the underground tunnel system. Everything in the fort besides a 15cm gun for firing illumination shells, a second anti-aircraft battery and a heavily reinforced radio building were connected to one another. Deep within the fort was a fully automated NATO monitoring center which used the retractable radar to spot incoming objects and track them. Originally, a 12.7cm naval gun was installed for firing illumination shells, but in the 1960s it was replaced by a West German-made 15cm gun. Below the 15cm gun turrets were their ammo wells which were stored inside concrete shelters with blast-proof steel doors. From there they would be wheeled to an ammo lift to go up to a waiting room just below the guns. When the gun was ready to be reloaded, the shell was transferred to another shell elevator which went directly to the gun.

The NATO control room.

A long tunnel in Fort Stevns.

In the 1960s, the anti-aircraft fire was supplied by 2 batteries of 3 dual-barreled 40mm Bofors Anti-Aircraft guns. These guns were later augmented by a battery of HAWK missiles in the 1970s, and the number of anti-aircraft guns was even increased, with 2 150cm spotlights also being added. Much of the equipment used in Fort Stevns, such as doors, beds and ventilation systems were taken from German Atlantikwall fortifications. All trailer mounted equipment on the surface of the fort were able to be airlifted by helicopters or driven away by light trucks. Several hundred men could shelter here for weeks during a nuclear war and survive for up to 2 months. The Danish decided to place their ventilation and exhaust pipes in 9 heavily armored concrete “houses” instead of grouping them into 1 shaft. Another amenity of the fort was a large underground hospital.

== History ==
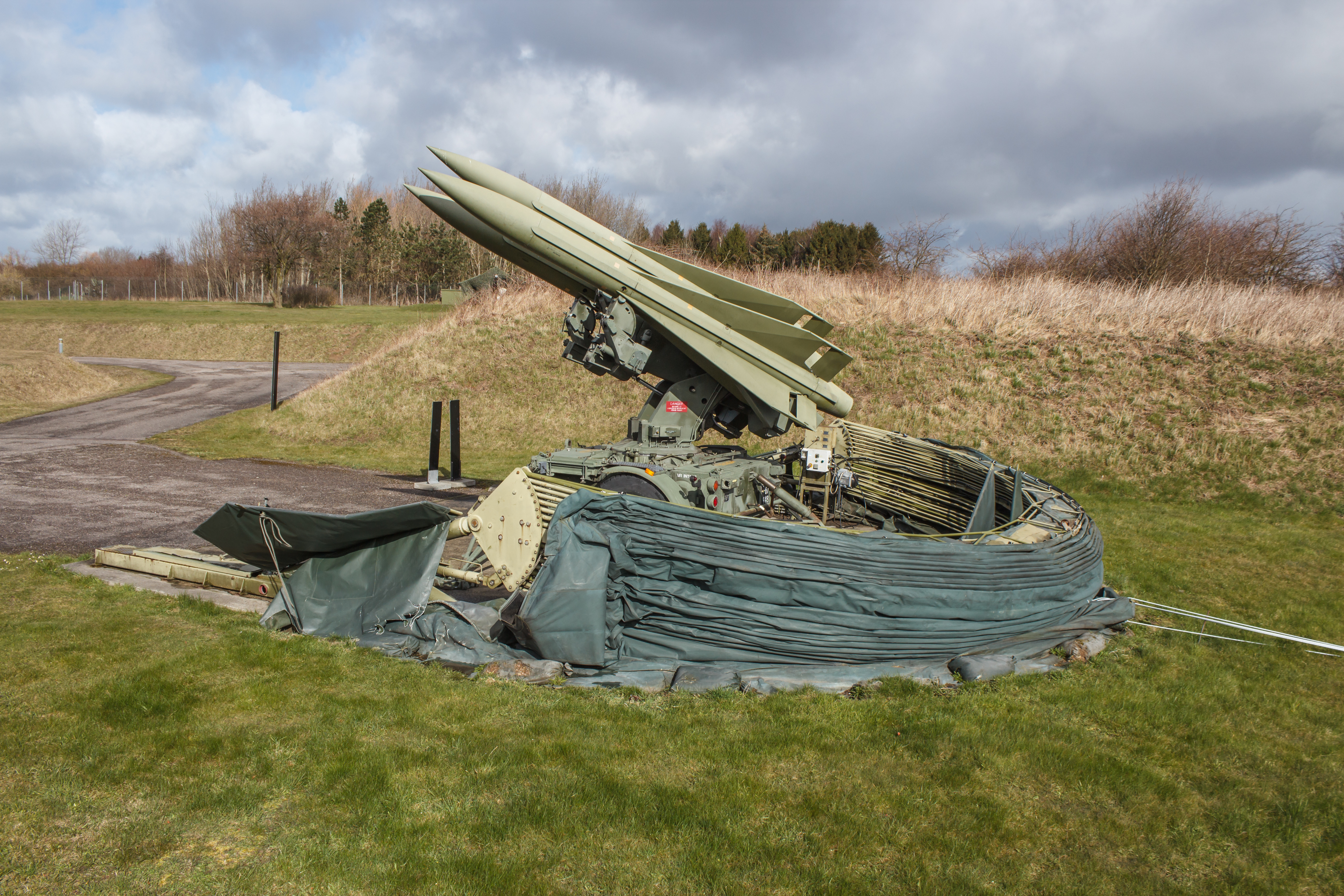
3 HAWK Missiles on display as part of the museum.

The original battery of 2 dual-barreled 15cm gun turrets dates from the German occupation in the early 1940s. The Germans built several underground portions of Fort Stevns today, but many tunnels had to be abandoned because they were too close to the surface. Between 1952 and 1953, the underground and most of the aboveground sections were built. In 1954, the aboveground barracks were completed. Between 1982 and 1984, the fort was modernized, with the command center moving to the original hospital area. In 1983, the 541st Royal Danish Air Force moved into Fort Stevns, and were armed with HAWK missiles. Their planes were parked in earthen ramparts, which during a time of conflict would make the planes sitting targets. The fort was also the command center of the Oresund sector naval forces. The fort was the last Danish fort to be closed after the Cold War. Fort Stevns was closed in 2000, and is now a museum. You can tour the 15cm gun turrets, various parts of the underground portion of the fort and several armored vehicles on display.
