= Sengeløse =

- Village
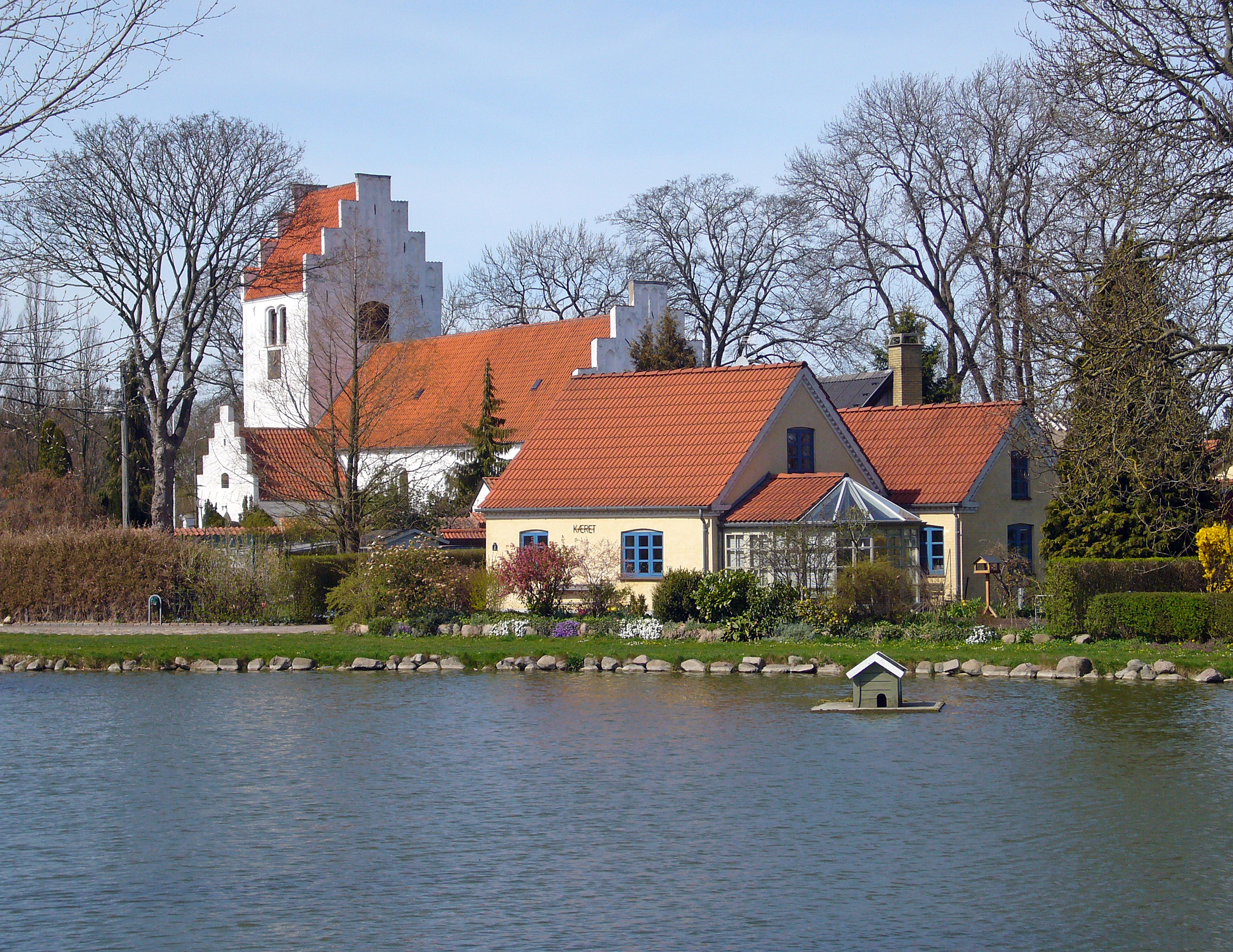
- Sengeløse Church

- Location within Denmark Location within Capital Region
- Coordinates: 55°40′54″N 12°14′52″E
- Country: Denmark
- Region: Capital (Hovedstaden)
- Municipality: Høje-Taastrup

Area
  - Urban: 0.89 km^{2} (0.34 sq mi)

Population (2026)
  - Urban: 1,488
  - Urban density: 1,700/km^{2} (4,300/sq mi)

Sengeløse is a town in the Høje-Taastrup Municipality in northeast Zealand, Denmark, about three kilometers northwest of Taastrup. As of 1 January 2026, it has a population of 1,488.

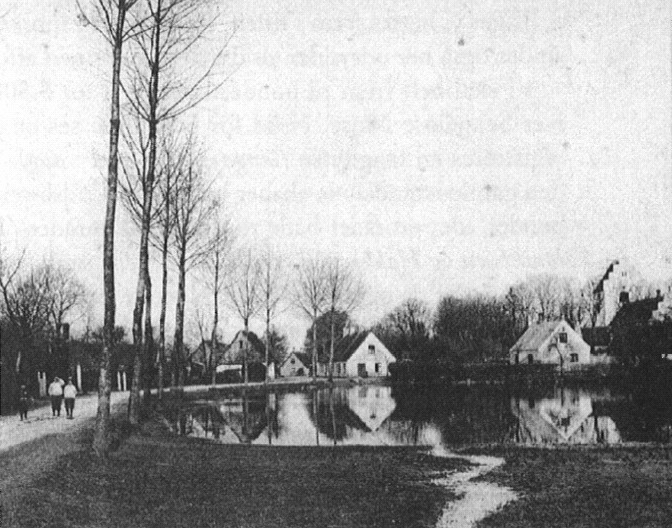
The town in 1909
