= Treaty of Taastrup =

1658 treaty between Sweden and Denmark-Norway

The Treaty of Taastrup (Freden i Høje Taastrup Præstegård) was a preliminary accord signed on 11 February 1658 between King Charles X Gustav of Sweden and King Frederick III of Denmark and Norway. The treaty was signed at the Høje Taastrup Church in Taastrup, Denmark. Individuals including Count Corfitz Ulfeldt participated in the peace negotiations after Denmark-Norway lost in the Second Northern War. The agreement was finalized through the Treaty of Roskilde. The original copy of the treaty is at the National Museum of Denmark (Nationalmuseet) in Copenhagen.

== See also ==
- List of treaties
