= Høje-Taastrup Municipality =

Høje-Taastrup Municipality Høje-Taastrup Kommune (Danish)
- Municipality
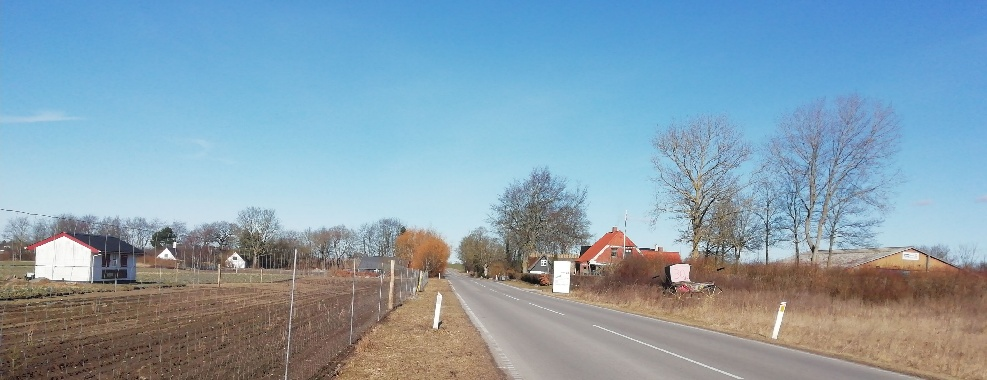

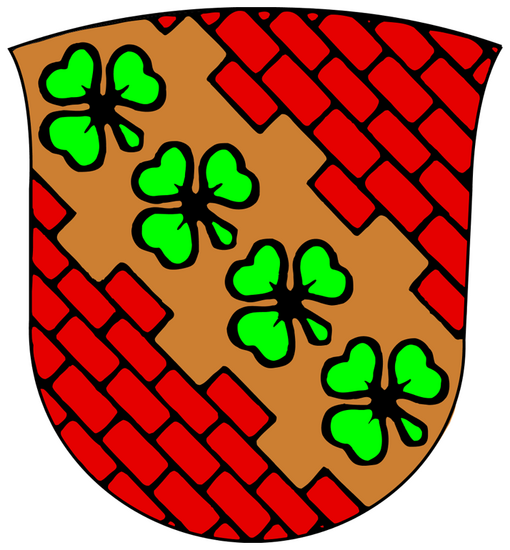
- Coat of arms

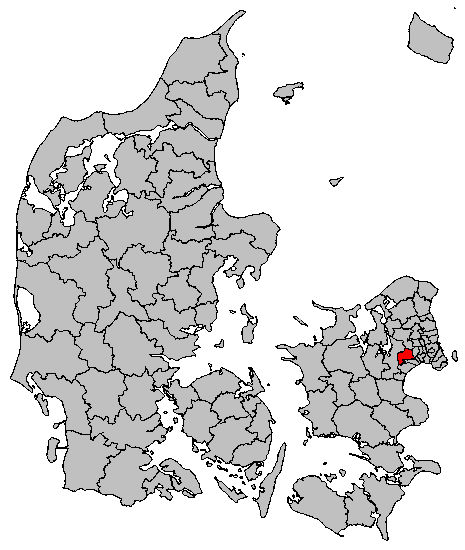
- Coordinates: 55°38′52″N 12°16′12″E
- Country: Denmark
- Region: Hovedstaden
- Established: 1970
- Seat: Taastrup

Government
  - Mayor: Michael Ziegler (C)

Area
  - Total: 78.41 km^{2} (30.27 sq mi)

Population (1. January 2026)
  - Total: 60,458
  - Density: 771.0/km^{2} (1,997/sq mi)
- Time zone: UTC+1 (CET)
  - Summer (DST): UTC+2 (CEST)
- Postal code: 2630
- Municipal code: 169
- Website: www.htk.dk

Høje-Taastrup Municipality (Danish: Høje-Taastrup Kommune) is a municipality (Danish, kommune) in the Capital Region on the island of Zealand (Sjælland) in eastern Denmark. The municipality covers an area of 78 km^{2} (30 sq mi), and has a total population of 60,458 (1 January 2026). It was formed by the 1970 Danish Municipal Reform, and its 1974 adjustment, by merging the parish municipalities of Høje Taastrup, Sengeløse, the Fløng part of Hvedstrup-Fløng and the Reerslev part of Reerslev-Vindinge. Since 1 January 2006 the mayor of the municipality has been Michael Ziegler, a member of the Conservative People's Party (Det Konservative Folkeparti) political party.

== Geography ==
The main town is the town of Taastrup. Other towns in the municipality include Høje Taastrup (without hyphenation), Hedehusene, Fløng, Sengeløse, Vridsløsemagle and Reerslev.

=== Locations ===
Taastrup	34,248
Hedehusene	12,250
Sengeløse	1,550
Reerslev	653
Vridsløsemagle	270

=== Neighbours ===
Neighboring municipalities are Albertslund and Vallensbæk to the east, Egedal to the north, Roskilde to the west, and Greve and Ishøj to the south. The Holbæk Motorway and the West Forest (Vestskoven) help define the municipality's eastern perimeter.

== Roads ==
The Holbæk Motorway bisects the municipality east-to-west, and is a major roadway connecting Copenhagen through Roskilde to Holbæk; it extends all the way to the tip of Sjællands Odde, a peninsula sticking out into the Kattegat where a ferry connects to Denmark's mainland (the Jutland peninsula) at the town of Ebeltoft. Additionally Motorring 4 splits off from the Holbæk Motorway at the municipality's eastern border leading to the various motorways servicing the northern parts of Zealand. The municipality's good position in the traffic network has led to the development of Høje-Taastrup Transportation Center, which includes Carlsberg Brewery's huge bottle depot.

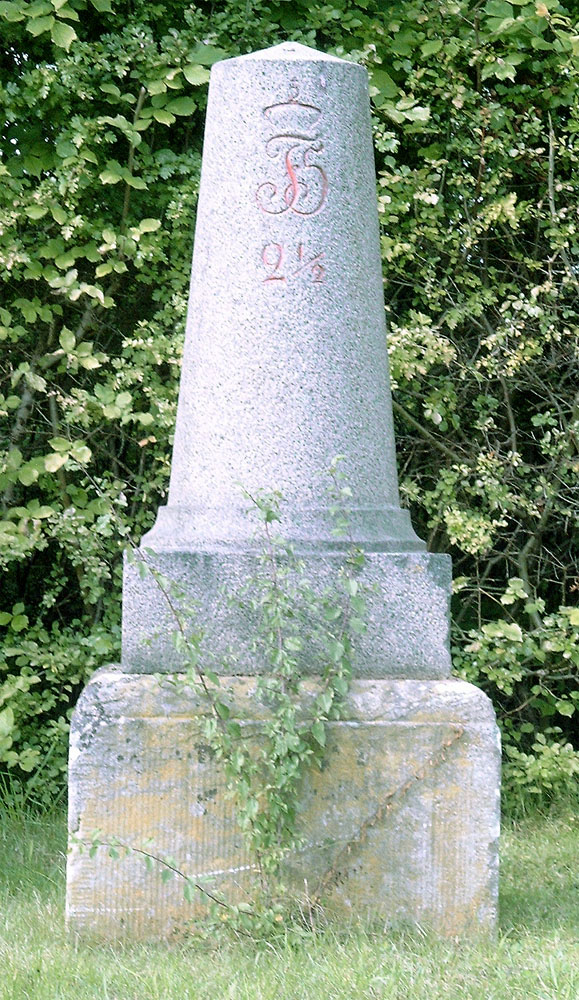
Historic milestone on Roskildevej, erected by King Frederik V (1746–1766)

The West Forest is located where the three municipalities of Høje-Taastrup, Albertslund, and Ledøje-Smørum border on one another. It is part of a system of green areas surrounding the Copenhagen metropolitan area. It offers an extensive system of hiking and bike trails through grass and marsh areas. It connects to other parts of the greenway system, allowing one to seamlessly make a tour around the metropolitan area.

Another throughway in this municipality is historic Roskilde Way (Roskildevej), which runs from Copenhagen to Roskilde. The first major road connecting these two cities was built in 1642 by King Christian IV. It was called The King's Road (Kongevejen), and was replaced in the 18th century by the current roadway. At Hedehusene, one of the towns in the municipality, the road changes name to Copenhagen Way (Københansvej), i.e. the road leading from Roskilde to Copenhagen. The Holbæk Motorway runs into, and has replaced part of the old Roskilde Way.

Road signs indicating that one is leaving the Copenhagen metropolitan area are mounted within the municipality, where the suburban residential area gives way to the countryside, and the more agricultural side of the municipality.

Høje-Taastrup municipality was not merged with other municipalities on 1 January 2007 as the result of nationwide Kommunalreformen ("The Municipal Reform" of 2007).

== The three railway station towns ==
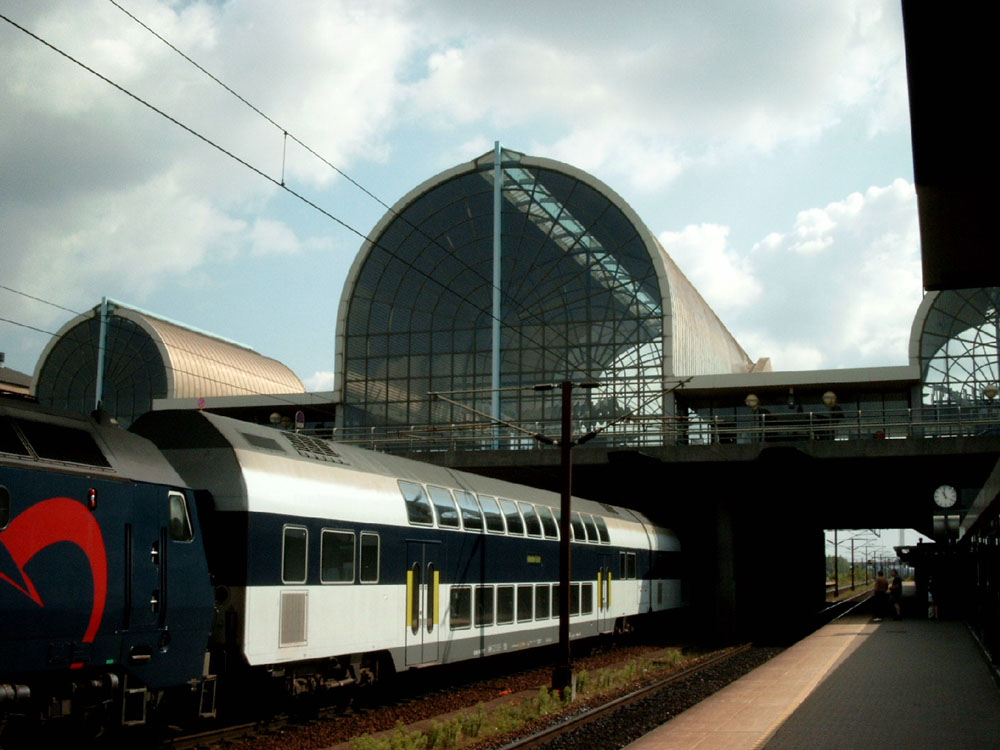
Høje-Taastrup train station

The towns of Høje Taastrup, Taastrup, and Hedehusene are railway station towns in the Greater Copenhagen Authority (Hovedstadens Udviklingsråd (HUR)). The station at Høje Taastrup is one of the largest in Denmark and offers excellent local (Copenhagen-area), regional (including Roskilde, Holbæk and Kalundborg), and national and even international train connections (for example, to Hamburg, Germany).

=== Høje Taastrup ===
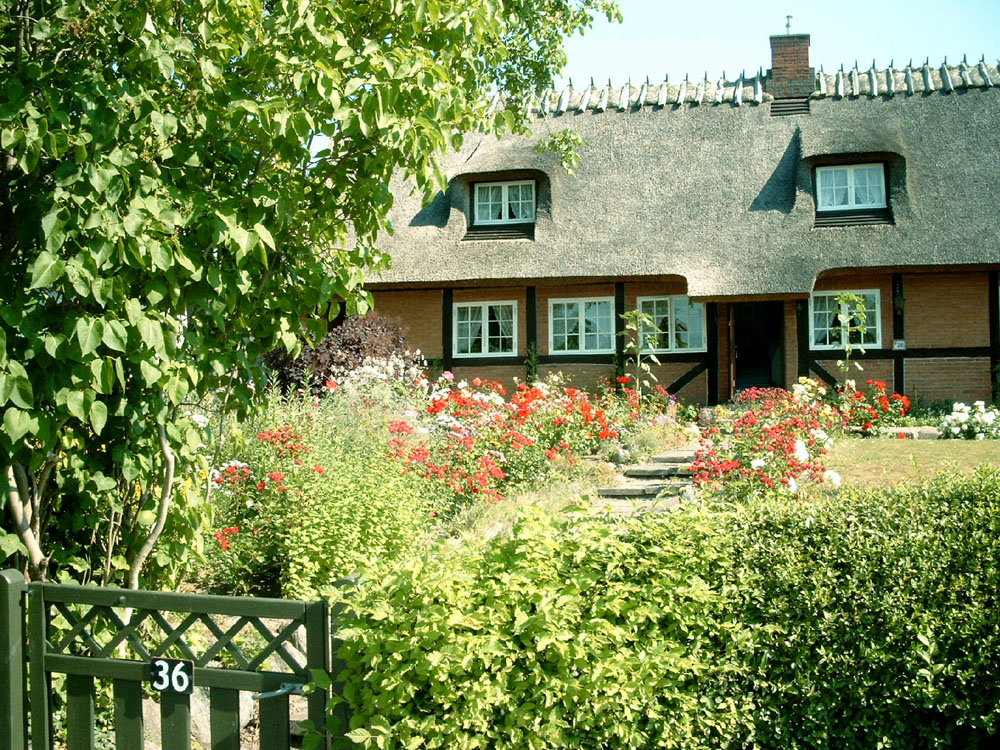
Typical thatch-roofed house

The town of Høje Taastrup is a new development, centered on the train station. Behind the former town hall lies the old village of Høje Taastrup, with its typical country church, picturesque thatch-roofed buildings, and a village pond complete with duck houses. It is a reminder of the area's agricultural past. The farmland that used to lie in the vicinity of the old village has been pretty much developed as of 2005.

Located at the south end of the railroad station complex is another area landmark— the 26.3-meter-tall (86 ft) sculpture "Thor's Tower" (Torstårnet), the tallest sculpture in the Nordic countries. It was made by Bjørn Nørgaard, and was inaugurated on 4 December 1986. There are several unique buildings in the same area, including the train station itself with its distinctive three arches. The three arches have become a symbol of the municipality, and have given rise to the moniker "The City of Arches" (Danish: Buernes By, which in a play on words sounds remarkably similar to the phrase Byernes By or "The City of Cities").

The city has a sizeable number of immigrants, mostly from Vietnam and Arab countries.

The town is home to City 2 shopping centre, Denmark's second largest shopping centre or mall.

=== Taastrup ===
The town of Taastrup is a railway town adjacent to Copenhagen suburbia. It lies to the east of Høje Taastrup, and its central street and shopping is around Taastrup hovedgade, formerly called Køgevej. Some of the shops are cafés, fastfood parlors, barbers, and jewelry stores. The housing project of Tåstrupgård is located in Taastrup.

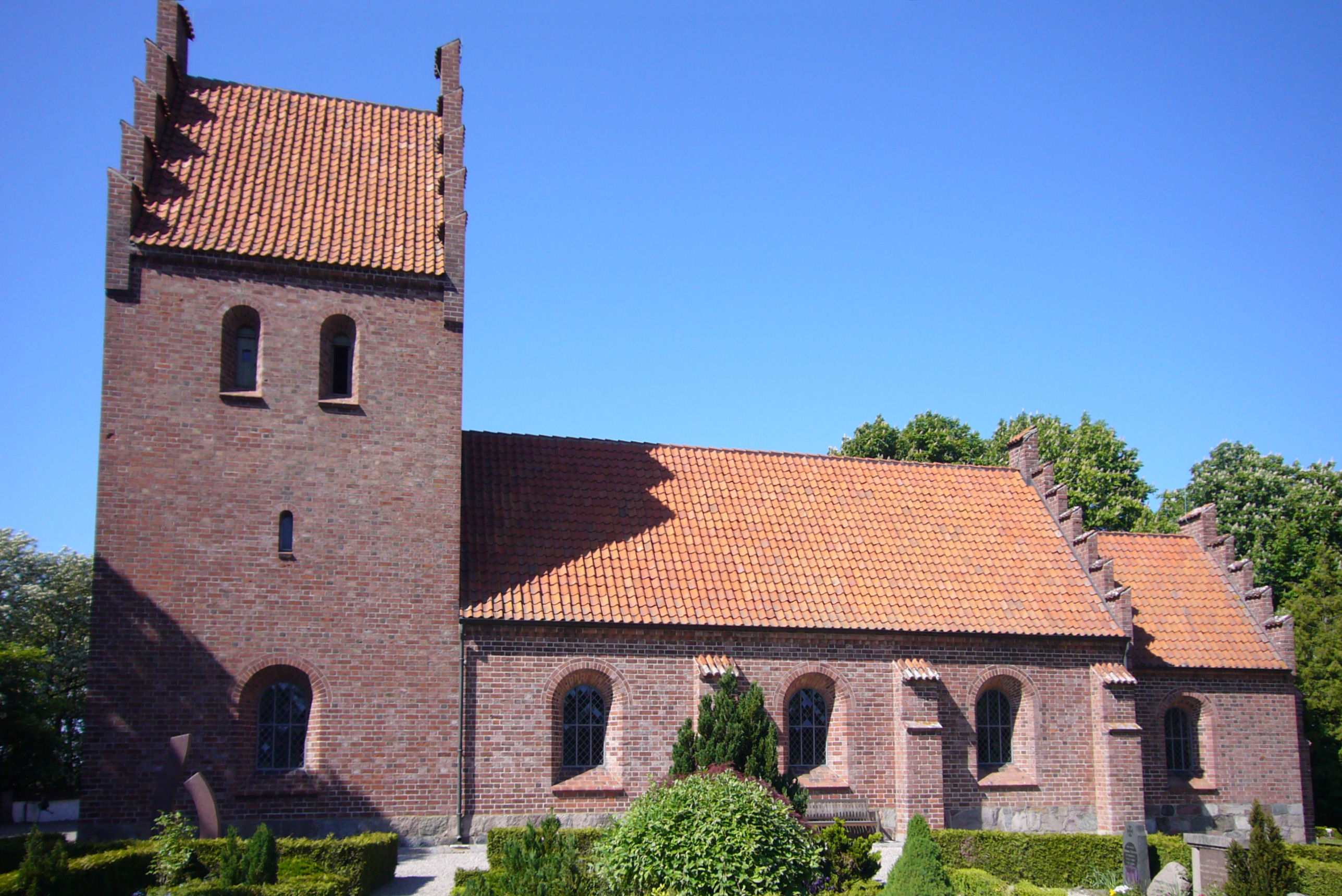
Reerslev Church

=== Hedehusene ===
Hedehusene lies to the west of Høje Taastrup, on the stretch of railway connecting Copenhagen-Høje Taastrup-Roskilde. The town got its name with the building of the King's Road leading to Roskilde. King Christian IV wanted a house built for an official who would keep watch over entry gates on the road. This became the first house (Danish: hus) on the heath (Danish: hede) or Danish prairie. Thus the town became Hedehusene (lit. "The houses on the heath")

Today the town has grown physically into neighboring Kallerup, Fløng, and Baldersbrønde. The most important commercial area is Roskilde Street (Roskildevej). Rockwool International, immediately west of the town, is the largest employer.

Hedeland, close by, is a unique nature area created at the site of a former gravel excavation area. It also features a 4,000 seat amphitheatre.

One of Denmark's oldest runestones, the Kallerup Stone (Kallerupstenen) from ca. 800-825 is erected at Ansgarkirken.

There are between 1000 and 1500 immigrants, the vast majority coming from Turkey (Sivas and Konya). And there are small groups from Pakistan, Bosnia Herzegovina, Iran and Iraq.

== Politics ==
=== Municipal council ===
Høje-Taastrup's municipal council consists of 21 members, elected every four years.

Below are the municipal councils elected since the Municipal Reform of 2007.

Election	Party								Total seats	Turnout	Elected mayor
Election	A	B	C	F	L	O	V	Ø	Total seats	Turnout	Elected mayor
2005	9	1	4	1		2	4		21	65.3%	Michael Ziegler (C)
2009	7	1	9	2		1	1		21	64.5%	Michael Ziegler (C)
2013	7		9	1		2	1	1	21	69.1%	Michael Ziegler (C)
2017	5	1	12		1	1		1	21	65.8%	Michael Ziegler (C)
Data from Kmdvalg.dk 2005, 2009, 2013 and 2017

== Historic attractions ==
- The Kroppedal museum in Vridsløsemagle is dedicated to the work of the Danish astronomer, Ole Rømer (1644–1710), who built his observatory here. The observatory operated until about 1716 when the remaining instruments were moved to the Rundetårn (lit. the "Round Tower") in Copenhagen. There is a large collection of ancient and more recent astronomical instruments on display at the museum.
- Reerslev Church
- Bjørn Nørgaard's sculpture Thor's Tower (Torstårn).

Several historic churches are located in Høje-Taastrup including: Blaakilde Church, City Church, Høje Taastrup Church, Reerslev Church, Rønnevang Church, Sankt Pauls Church, Sengeløse Church, Skt. Maria & Skt. Markus Church and Taastrup New Church.

== Notable people ==
- Thorald Brendstrup (1812–1883), painter
- Marie Rovsing (1814–1888), pioneering Danish women's rights activist
- Hansine Andræ (1817–1898), early Danish feminist who proposed changes to Denmark's marriage liturgy for the benefit of women
- Volrath Vogt (1817–1889), Norwegian theologian, educator and author
- Rasmus Prehn (born 1973), politician, Minister for Development Cooperation
- Hans Lindberg (born 1981), handballer
- Dennis Ceylan (born 1989), boxer
- Puls (formed 2010), pop, dance and club music band
- Stine Eiberg (born 1998), handballer

== Twin towns – sister cities ==
Høje-Taastrup is twinned with:

- Ängelholm, Sweden
- Oldenburg, Germany
- Valmiera, Latvia

== See also ==
- Treaty of Taastrup
