= Taastrup =

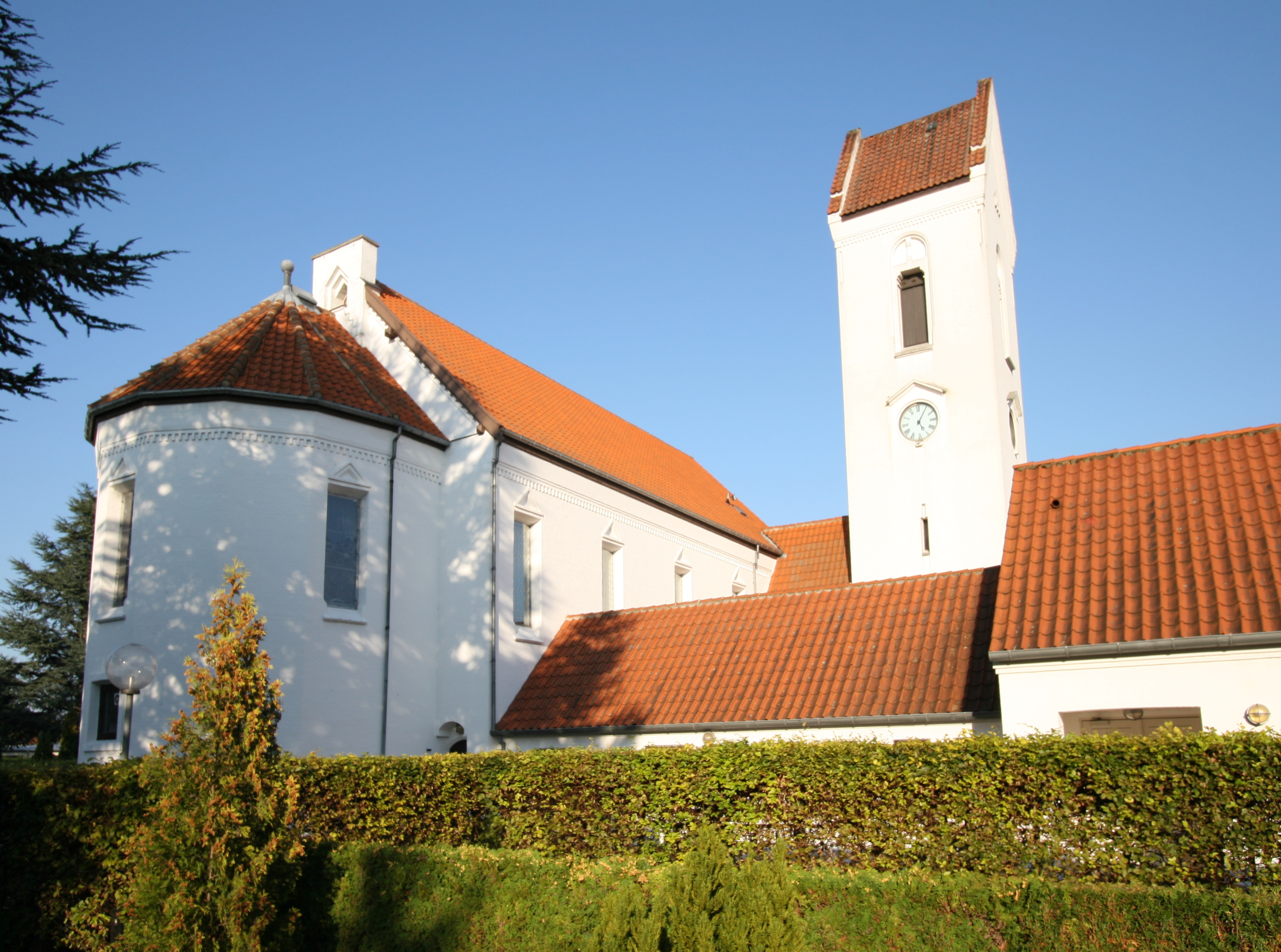
- Taastrup New Church in September 2006

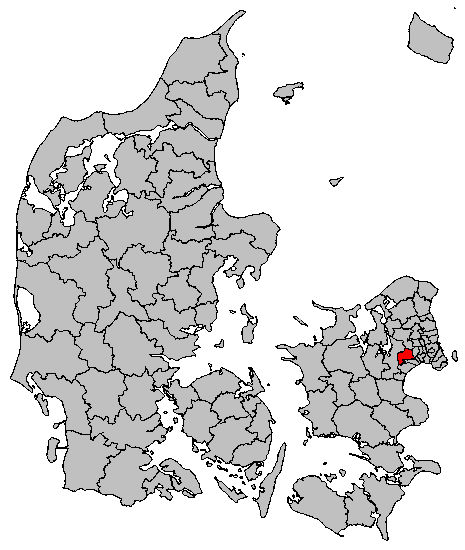

- Location within Denmark
- Coordinates: 55°39′04″N 12°15′58″E
- Country: Denmark
- Region: Capital (Hovedstaden)
- Municipality: Høje-Taastrup

Government
  - Mayor: Michael Ziegler

Area
  - Urban: 13.4 km^{2} (5.2 sq mi)
- Elevation: 28 m (92 ft)

Population (2026)
  - Urban: 38,328
  - Urban density: 2,860/km^{2} (7,410/sq mi)
  - Gender: 19,315 males and 19,013 females
  - Municipality: 60,458
- Time zone: UTC+1 (CET)
  - Summer (DST): UTC+2 (CEST)
- Postal code: 2630
- Area code: (+45) 43
- Website: htk.dk

Taastrup (or Tåstrup) (Danish pronunciation: [ˈtsʰɒstʁɔp]) is a Danish railway town and suburb of Copenhagen – 18 km west of Copenhagen's city centre. The town forms a twin urban area with neighbouring suburb Høje Taastrup, Taastrup rising since 1859 and Høje Taastrup rising west of the town, since the 1970s. The town/suburb development has engulfed the villages of Taastrup Valby, Høje Taastrup, Kragehave and Klovtofte, although Høje Taastrup still has a preserved village character around Høje Taastrup Church. The town is the administrative seat of Høje Taastrup Municipality, Region Hovedstaden; the seat placed in Taastrup first and since moving to Høje Taastrup in the beginning of the 1980s. In 2023 a new town hall was opened on 14 February.

The town is growing closer to the town of Hedehusene, both towns developing towards each other, and both situated in the municipality. The population on 1 January 2025 was 38,178 (excluding Hedehusene).

Taastrup's name is attestet from the 12. century and comes from -Thorstenstorp, simply meaning Thorsten's Village.

== Geography ==
The town is situated approximately halfway between Copenhagen and Roskilde, in proximity to the Copenhagen suburb/new town Albertslund, the town of Hedehusene and the villages of Ishøj Landsby, Sengeløse and Vridsløsemagle.

== Notable people ==
- Lene Rachel Andersen (born 1968 in Taastrup) a Danish author, indie publisher, economist, futurist and philosopher
- Artillery (formed 1982 in Taastrup) a Danish thrash metal band
- Kristina Kristiansen (born 1989 in Taastrup) a Danish handball player for Nykøbing Falster and the Danish national team
- Jesper Nohrstedt (born 1994) a Danish pop singer, brought up in Taastrup
- Jesper Lindstrøm (born 2000) a Danish footballer, born in Taastrup

== Twinned cities ==
- Oldenburg, Germany
- Spotorno, Italy

== See also ==
- Høje Taastrup railway station
- Taastrup railway station
- Taastrup Water Tower
- Treaty of Taastrup
- Danish Technological Institute
