= Zealand =

Most populous island of Denmark

Native name: Sjælland
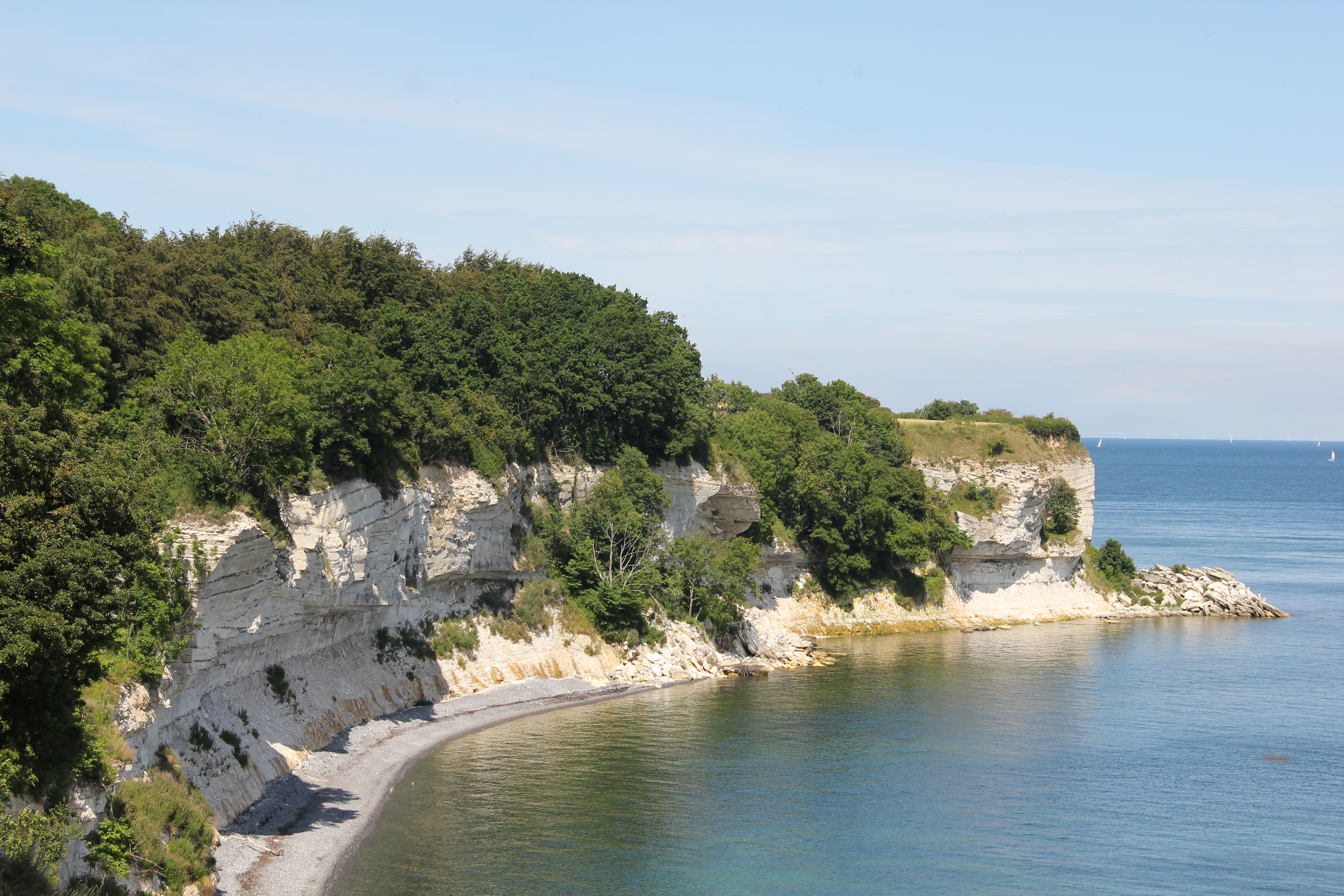
- The Cliffs of Stevns just south of Copenhagen

Geography
- Location: Danish Straits
- Coordinates: 55°30′N 11°45′E
- Adjacent to: Øresund; Great Belt; Smålandsfarvandet; Kattegat
- Area: 7,031 km^{2} (2,715 sq mi)
- Area rank: 95th
- Highest elevation: 122.9 m (403.2 ft)
- Highest point: Kobanke

Administration
- Danish Realm
- Constituent country: Denmark
- Region: Capital Region of Denmark, Region Zealand
- Largest settlement: Copenhagen (pop. 1,627,705 ^{(urban)})

Demographics
- Demonym: Zealander
- Population: 2,319,705
- Population rank: 36th
- Pop. density: 327.41/km^{2} (847.99/sq mi)
- Languages: Danish (Insular); Danish Sign; English
- Ethnic groups: Danes (large majority); Germans; Pakistanis; Turks; Poles

Additional information
- Time zone: Central European Time (UTC+1)
  - Summer (DST): Central European Summer Time (UTC+2)

Zealand (Danish: Sjælland [ˈɕɛˌlænˀ]) is the largest and most populous island in Denmark proper (thus excluding Greenland and Disko Island, which are larger in size) at 7,031 km^{2} (2715 sq. mi.). Zealand had a population of 2,319,705 on 1 January 2020, comprising 40% of the country's population.

Zealand is the 13th-largest island in Europe by area and the 4th most populous. It is connected to Sprogø and Funen by the Great Belt Fixed Link and to Amager by several bridges in Copenhagen. Indirectly, through the island of Amager and the Øresund Bridge, it is also linked to Scania in Sweden. In the south, the Storstrøm Bridge and the Farø Bridges connect it to Falster, and beyond that island to Lolland; the Fehmarnbelt Tunnel, currently under construction, would connect Lolland to the German island of Fehmarn, which is itself connected with mainland Europe.

Copenhagen, the capital of Denmark, with a population between 1.3 and 1.4 million people in 2020, is located mostly on the eastern shore of Zealand and partly on the island of Amager. Other cities on Zealand include Roskilde, Hillerød, Næstved, Helsingør, Slagelse, Køge, Holbæk and Kalundborg.

Administratively, Zealand is divided between two Danish regions: The Copenhagen metropolitan area and North Zealand belong to the Capital Region, while the major and more rural part of the island belongs to the Zealand Region.

== Etymology ==
The origin of the Danish name Sjælland is not exactly known. Sjæl in modern Danish means "soul"; a derivation from siô/sæ (meaning "lake" or "sea") has been assumed. However, today a common hypothesis is that the Old Danish form Siâland is based on the word *selha- with the ending *wundia-. The latter means "indicates, resembles". The word *selha- may have two different meanings: "seal" (in modern Danish sæl) or "deep bay, fjord". Since Roskilde is a major and ancient settlement on Zealand, accessible by sea through the narrow Roskilde Fjord (branched from the Isefjord), it has been assumed that the sailors named the island after this. The Swedish name of the island is Själland, an adaptation to the different orthography used in that language.

The English form may be borrowed from the German form Seeland. These forms might be based on the assumption that the first part means sea or lake (German See), or they could simply be based on an alternative Danish form of the name, Sælland, which was common until the 19th century.

=== Relation to New Zealand ===
The island nation of New Zealand has no etymological relations to Zealand. New Zealand is named after the Dutch province of Zeeland, which is sometimes referred to as and/or anglicized to Zealand, but is not to be confused with the Danish island. However, there is a historical connection between Denmark and New Zealand based on 19th century immigration of Scandinavians, especially Danes, to New Zealand's North Island, particularly to the districts of the southern Hawkes Bay and the northern Wairarapa.

== History ==
The tribal Danes came from Zealand and Scania and spoke an early form of North Germanic. Historians believe that before their arrival, most of Jutland and the nearest islands were settled by tribal Jutes. The Jutes migrated to Great Britain eventually, some as mercenaries of Brythonic King Vortigern, and were granted the south-eastern territories of Kent, the Isle of Wight and other areas, where they settled. They were later absorbed or ethnically cleansed by the invading Angles and Saxons, who formed the Anglo-Saxons. The remaining Jutish population in Jutland assimilated in with the settling Danes.

Valdemar's Zealandic Law was a civil code enacted in the 13th century. Prior to the adoption of the Jutlandic, Zealandic and the Scanian laws, there had been no uniformity of laws throughout settlements in Denmark. Ringsted and later Roskilde were the first important political and religious centres on the island, a role later taken over by Copenhagen. Other important religious centres prior to the Reformation were Sorø Abbey at Sorø and Esrom Abbey at Esrum. With its strategic location at the entrance to the Øresund, especially after the construction of Kronborg Castle and the introduction of Sound Dues, Helsingør would later develop into the most important town and seaport outside Copenhagen.

Most of North Zealand was for centuries, starting in the late 16th century, owned by the crown and used mainly as a royal hunting domain. Local manors played a central role in the economy on the rest of the island.

Early industrial centres outside Copenhagen included Mølleåen with its watermills, the Kronborg Arms Factory at Hellebæk, Johan Frederik Classen's Frederick's Works at Frederiksværk and Niels Ryberg's Køng Textile Factory at Vordingborg. Substantial parts of the southernmost part of the island was in the 18th century part of Vordingborg Cavalry District.

The first railways on the island were constructed by Det Sjællandske Jernbaneselskab (1847-1888). The first section opened between Copenhagen and Roskilde in 1847. The island was heavily fortified between the 17th Century and the Cold War. One of the last forts operational in Eastern Zealand is Fort Stevns, which was decommissioned in 2000.

== Mythological origins ==
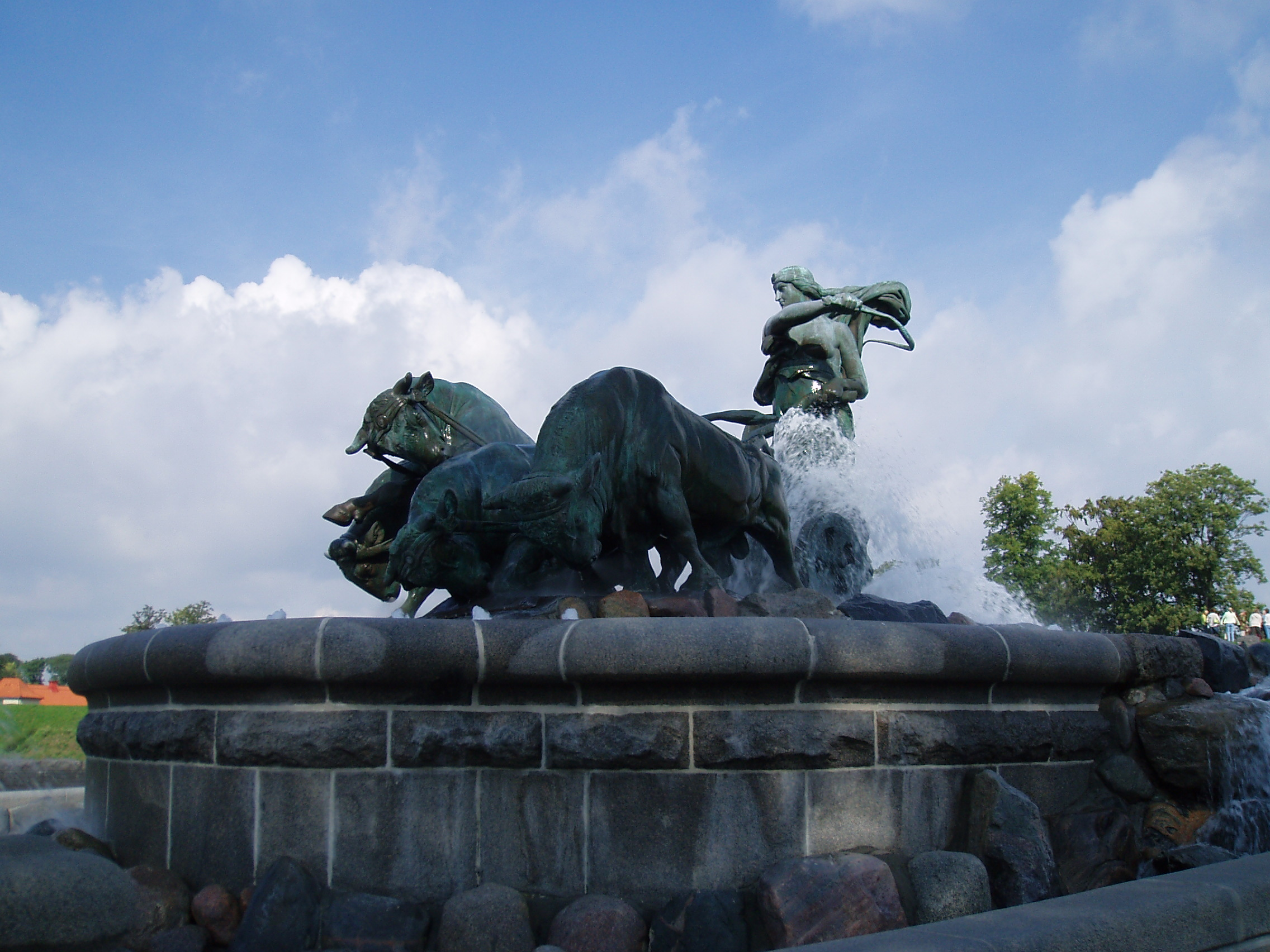
The Gefion Fountain in Copenhagen, showing the Norse goddess Gefjon carving Zealand from Sweden.

In Norse mythology as told in the Gylfaginning, the island was created by the goddess Gefjun after she tricked Gylfi, the king of Sweden. She removed a piece of land and transported it to Denmark, which became Zealand. The vacant area was filled with water and became Mälaren. However, since modern maps show a similarity between Zealand and the Swedish lake Vänern, it is sometimes identified as the hole left by Gefjun. Gefjun is queen of King Skjöldr, eponymous ancestor of the Scyldings, related to the etymological debate.

== Geography ==
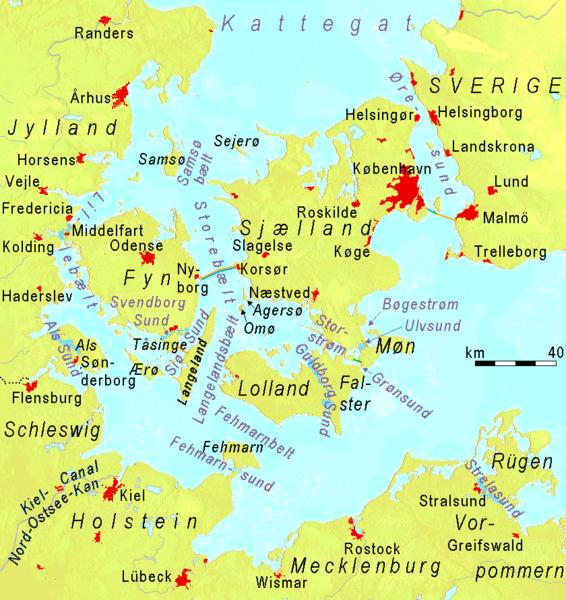
The island of Zealand (Sjælland) and the Danish Straits between Denmark and Sweden, connecting the Baltic Sea – on the right – and the Atlantic Ocean.

Zealand is the most populous Danish island. It is irregularly shaped, and is north of the islands of Lolland, Falster, and Møn. The small island of Amager lies immediately east. With an area of 7,031 km^{2} (1,737,000 acres), it is similar in size to Crete or Leyte.

Copenhagen is mostly on Zealand but extends across northern Amager. A number of bridges and the Copenhagen Metro connect Zealand to Amager, which is connected to Scania in Sweden by the Øresund Bridge via the artificial island of Peberholm. Zealand is joined in the west to Funen, by the Great Belt Fixed Link, and Funen is connected by bridges to the country's mainland, Jutland.

On 5 June 2007, the regional subsidiary of national broadcaster DR reported that Kobanke in the southeast near the town Rønnede in Faxe Municipality, with a height of 122.9 metres (403 ft), was the highest natural point on Zealand. Gyldenløveshøj, south of the city Roskilde, has a height of 126 metres (413 ft). However, that is due to a man-made hill from the 17th century and its highest natural point is only 121.3 metres (398 ft).

Zealand gives its name to the Selandian era of the Paleocene.

== Cities and towns ==
Urban areas with 10,000+ inhabitants:

| # | Urban area | Municipality | Population |
|---|---|---|---|
| 1 | Copenhagen | Multiple | 1,213,822 |
| 2 | Roskilde | Roskilde Municipality | 47,828 |
| 3 | Helsingør | Helsingør Municipality | 46,368 |
| 4 | Hørsholm | Multiple | 45,865 |
| 5 | Næstved | Næstved Municipality | 41,857 |
| 6 | Køge | Køge Municipality | 35,295 |
| 7 | Taastrup | Høje-Taastrup Municipality | 32,719 |
| 8 | Slagelse | Slagelse Municipality | 32,133 |
| 9 | Hillerød | Hillerød Municipality | 30,570 |
| 10 | Holbæk | Holbæk Municipality | 27,195 |
| 11 | Ringsted | Ringsted Municipality | 21,412 |
| 12 | Ølstykke-Stenløse | Egedal Municipality | 20,984 |
| 13 | Birkerød | Rudersdal Municipality | 19,919 |
| 14 | Måløv-Smørumnedre | Multiple | 19,143 |
| 15 | Farum | Furesø Municipality | 18,422 |
| 16 | Kalundborg | Kalundborg Municipality | 16,303 |
| 17 | Lillerød | Allerød Municipality | 15,795 |
| 18 | Frederikssund | Frederikssund Municipality | 15,602 |
| 19 | Solrød Strand | Solrød Municipality | 15,159 |
| 20 | Korsør | Slagelse Municipality | 14,538 |
| 21 | Værløse | Furesø Municipality | 12,842 |
| 22 | Frederiksværk | Halsnæs Municipality | 12,191 |
| 23 | Vordingborg | Vordingborg Municipality | 11,643 |
| 24 | Hedehusene-Fløng | Høje-Taastrup Municipality | 11,345 |
| 25 | Haslev | Faxe Municipality | 11,201 |

== See also ==
- North Zealand
- New Zealand
