= Hedehusene =

- Town
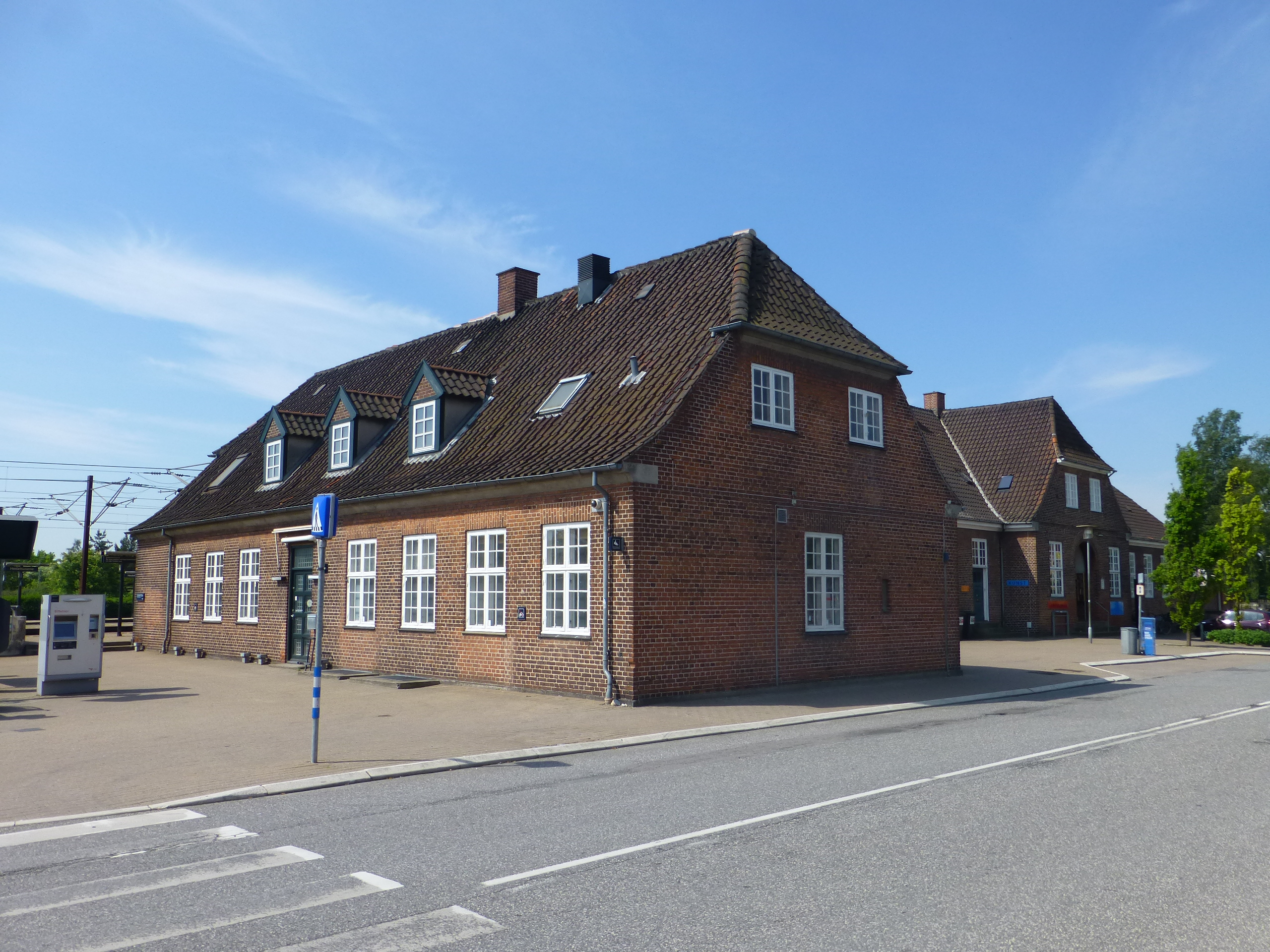

- Location in Denmark Hedehusene (Capital Region)
- Coordinates: 55°39′N 12°11′E
- Country: Denmark
- Region: Capital (Hovedstaden)
- Municipality: Høje-Taastrup

Area
  - Urban: 6.9 km^{2} (2.7 sq mi)

Population (2026)
  - Urban: 17,953
  - Urban density: 2,600/km^{2} (6,700/sq mi)
  - Gender: 9,071 males and 8,882 females
- Time zone: UTC+1 (CET)
  - Summer (DST): UTC+2 (CEST)
- Postal code: 2640 Hedehusene

Hedehusene is a suburban town located on the rail line between Copenhagen and Roskilde in the Capital Region of Denmark. It has absorbed the villages of Baldersbrønde and Fløng and almost merged with Roskilde's eastern Trekroner neighbourhood to the west and Høje Taastrup to the east. To the south is the large recreational area Hedeland. As of 1 January 2026, the town had a population of 17,953. A large development project, NærHeden, created as a collaboration between Høje-Taastrup Municipality and Realdania, will expand the town to the southeast with a new sustainable neighbourhood.

== History ==
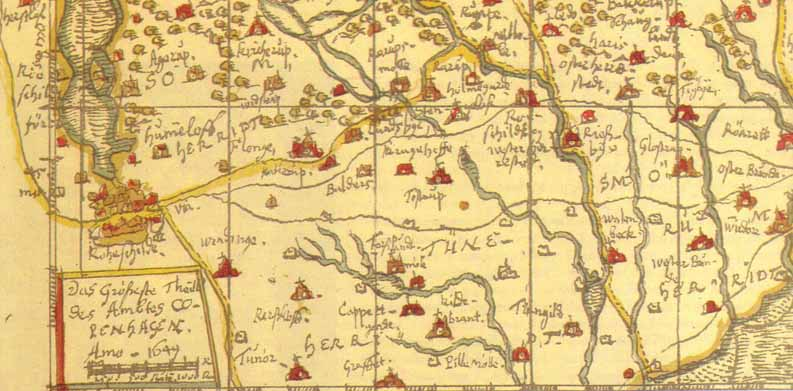
The locality in 1649

The flat and fertile moraine landscape between Roskilde, Køge and Copenhagen was since the Middle Ages known as Hedeboegnen or simply Heden ("The Heath"). The name was merely a reference to the flat and open character of the landscape at a time when much of Denmark was covered by forest while it was not covered by heath in the ecological sense of the word. Villages in the area included Fløng, Kallerup, Baldersbrønde and Marbjerg.

A road had since the 13th century connected Copenhagen and Roskilde. In 1641, Christian IV ordered the construction of a new, private road, Roskilde Kongevej, a so-called kongevej, which was completed in 1642. A house known as Kongens Hedehus ("The King's Heath House"), often referred to simply as Hedehuset ("The Heath House") built for a Vogt (foged) who was responsible for overseeing that only royalty or people authorized by the king used the road. He was instructed to prosecute trespassers and shoot their horses. A special key was made for the gate at the Heath House and another one for the gate at Røde Port ("Red Gate") in Roskilde. The house was located where Tværvej 1 in Hedehusene is today.

In 1658, the Heath House was converted into an inn after the road was opened to other travellers at the end of the Swedish Wars. It was joined by two more inns at the site in 1682 and 1702. They initially operated without licenses since they were located too close to Roskilde to obtain a royal privilege. From 1733, they were licensed on condition that all beer and Akvavit was purchased in Roskilde and that they paid a tax of 4 rigsdaler to the city. Roskilde Kongevej gradually fell into despair and two of the inns had to close when the new Roskildevej opened in 1776.

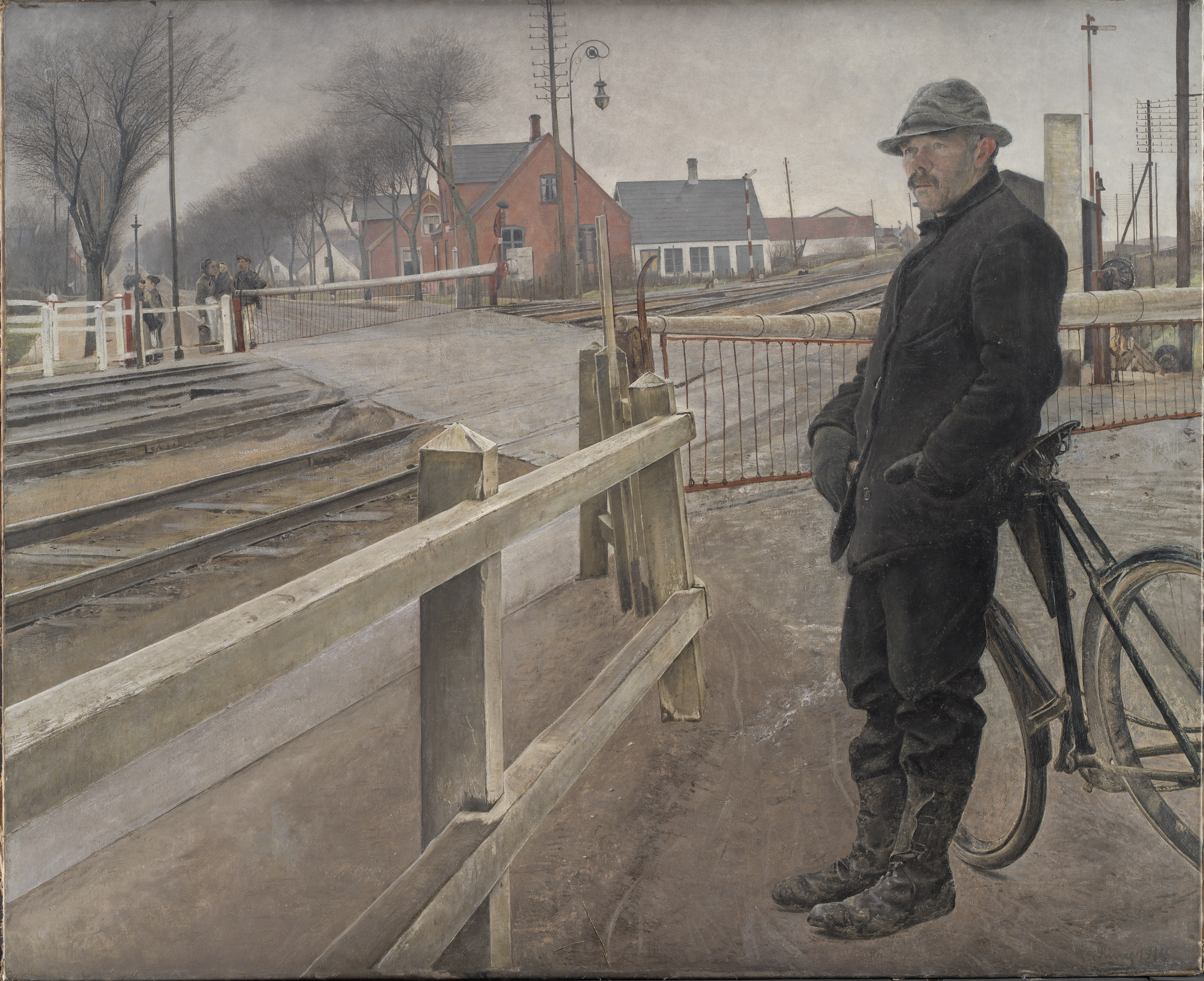
Waiting for the train. The level crossing of the Copenhagen–Roskilde railway line and Roskilde Landevej in Hedehusene. Painting by L. A. Ring, 1914.

Hedehusene railway station opened when the Copenhagen–Roskilde railway line was inaugurated in 1847. The station was only built because the steam locomotives had to make frequent stops for water. In 1892, one of the local farms, Hedehusgården, was purchased by an engineer who established several gravel pits on the land. Hedehus Brickyard was founded by F. L. Schmidt in 1896. Danmark closed in 1970 and Hedehus Brickyard in 1980.

From the 1870s, considerable redevelopment of the area has taken place with housing.

== NærHeden development project ==
A new neighbourhood, Nærheden, is planned in the southwestern outskirts of Hedehusene. It is the result of a collaboration between Høje-Taastrup Municipality and Realdania and will consist approximately 4,500 homes. The competition to design the masterplan was won by a team led by Arkitema Architects in 2014. The plan includes a number of varied housing clusters and public spaces arranged along a recreational loop.

== Economy ==
Hedehusene is home to several large companies. Rockwool International is a major manufacturer of mineral wool. The logistics company DSV moved its global headquarters to Hedehusene in 2014. It consists of a16,000 m^{2} (170,000 sq ft) office building and a 12,000 m^{2} (130,000 sq ft) logistics terminal.

== Landmarks ==
=== Churches ===
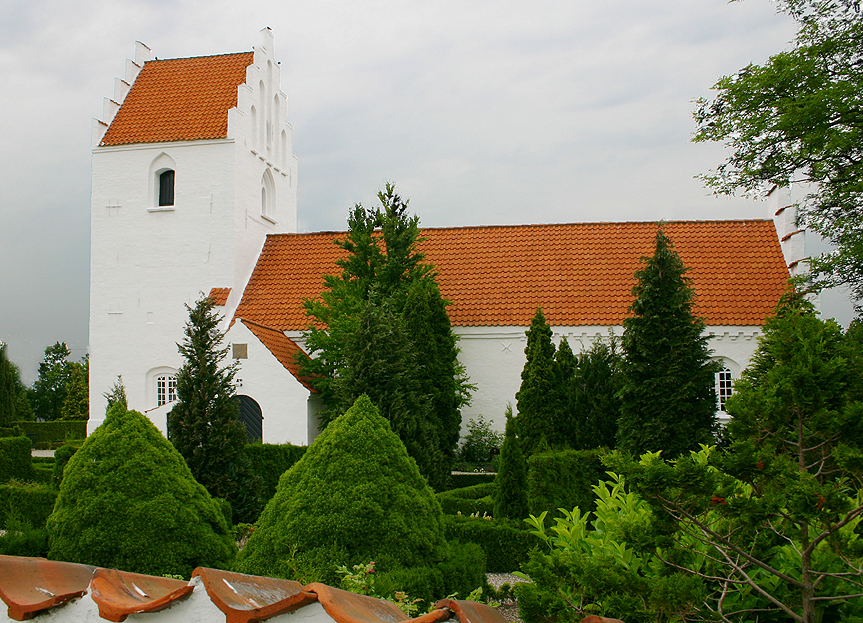
Fløng Church

There are two churches in Hedehusene. Fløng Church dates from the middle of the 12th century and was built by members of the Snubbe family, a branch of the powerful Hvide dynasty residing at Bytteborg. The church originally consisted of chancel and nave under a flat roof. The tower was already added to its western end in approximately 1200. The height of the tower was increased with 19 metres in the 16th century. A porch was also constructed on the north side and a new roof with cross vaults was added. The original chancel was torn down in about 1500.

Ansgar's Church in the modern part of Hedehusene was inaugurated in 1921. It was designed by Frederik Appel.

=== The Kallerup Stone ===
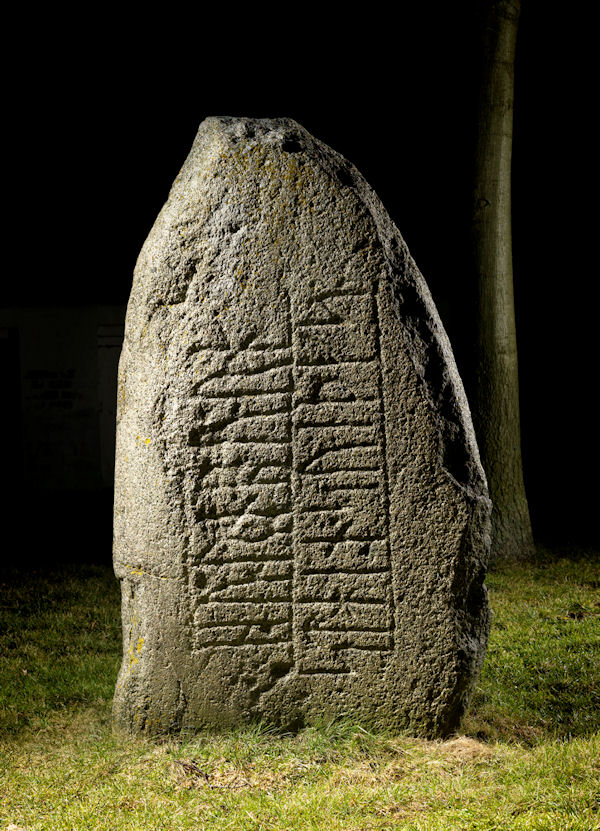
The Kallerup Stone

The cemetery at Ansgar's Church features the Kallerup Stone, one of the oldest runestones found in Denmark. It dates from the early Viking period (c. 800 to 825) and was discovered by a stonemason on a field at Kallerup in 1869.

=== Hedeland ===
The vast recreational area Hedeland has an area of 15 square kilometres. It is home to a wide selection of recreational facilities, including a golf course, a kart circuit, a vintage railway, equestrian centre, amphi theatre, ski hill and fishing ponds.

== Transport ==
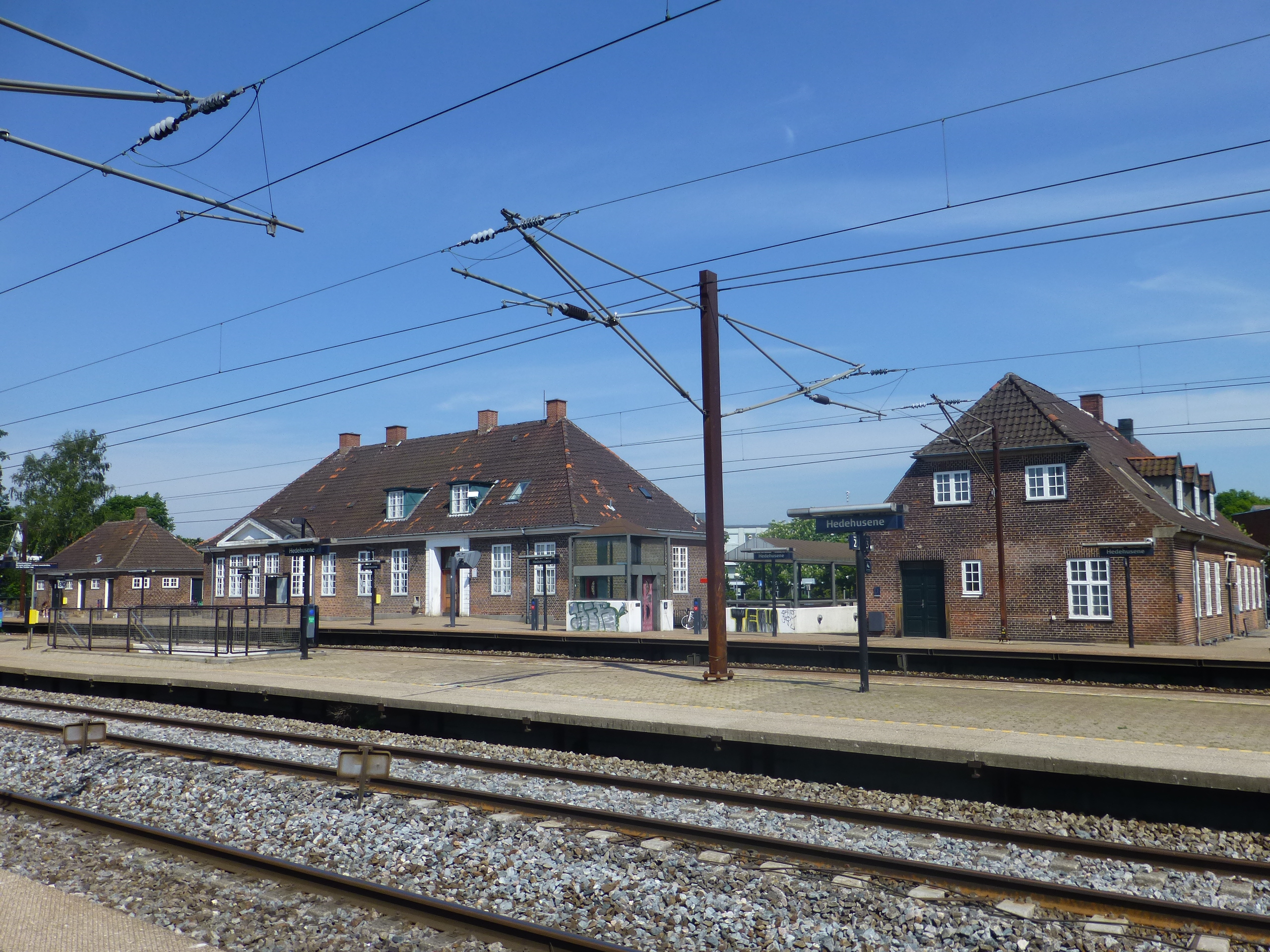
Hedehusene railway station in 2014.

Hedehusene is served by Hedehusene railway station which is served by regional trains between Copenhagen and Ringsted. Travel times by train are 20–23 minutes to Copenhagen Central Station and seven minutes to Roskilde.

The Holbæk Motorway (M11, part of Danish national road 21) runs north of Hedehusene and has exits at Baldersbrønde and Fløng. Hedehusene's main street, Hovedgaden, is part of Secondary route 159 ("Roskildevej").

== Cultural references ==
Dynamite-Harry is being followed by a helicopter on the main street in Hedehusene at 1:29:12 in the 1969 Olsen-banden film The Olsen Gang in a Fix.

== Notable people ==
- The painter L.A. Ring (1854–1933) lived with his family in the old school in Baldersbrønde for 12 years.
- Jørgen Kristensen (born 1946), nicknamed Troldmanden (the Wizard), is a Danish former football player, he played 19 matches and scored three goals for the Denmark national football team.
