= European route E45 =

Road in trans-European E-road network

Major junctions
- North end: Alta, Norway
- South end: Gela, Italy

Location
- Countries: Norway; Finland; Sweden; Denmark; Germany; Austria; Italy

Highway system

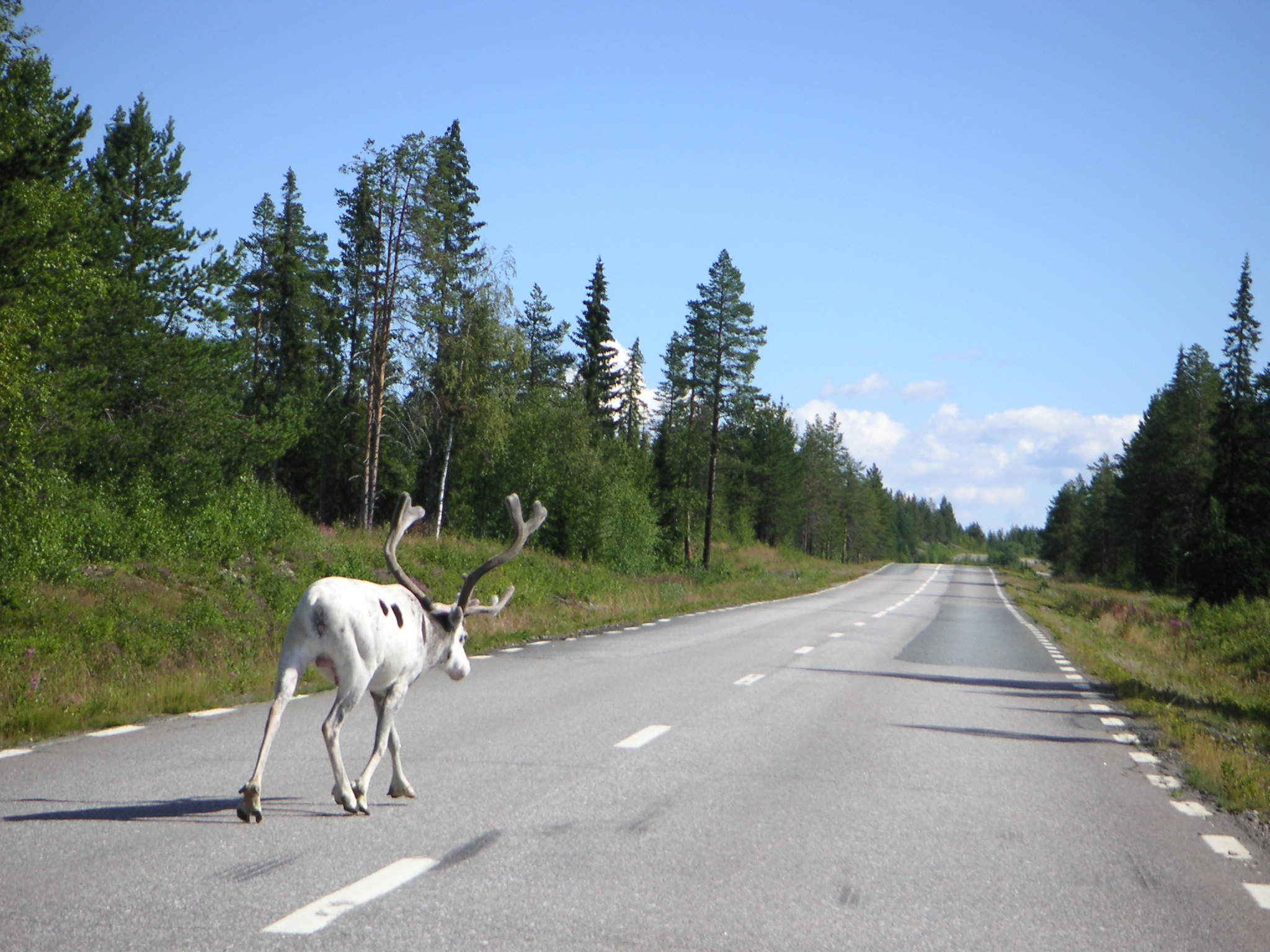
E45 between Sorsele and Slagnäs in Lapland, Sweden. The speed limit here has been reduced to 100 km/h (62 mph) from 110 km/h (68 mph) since this picture was taken.

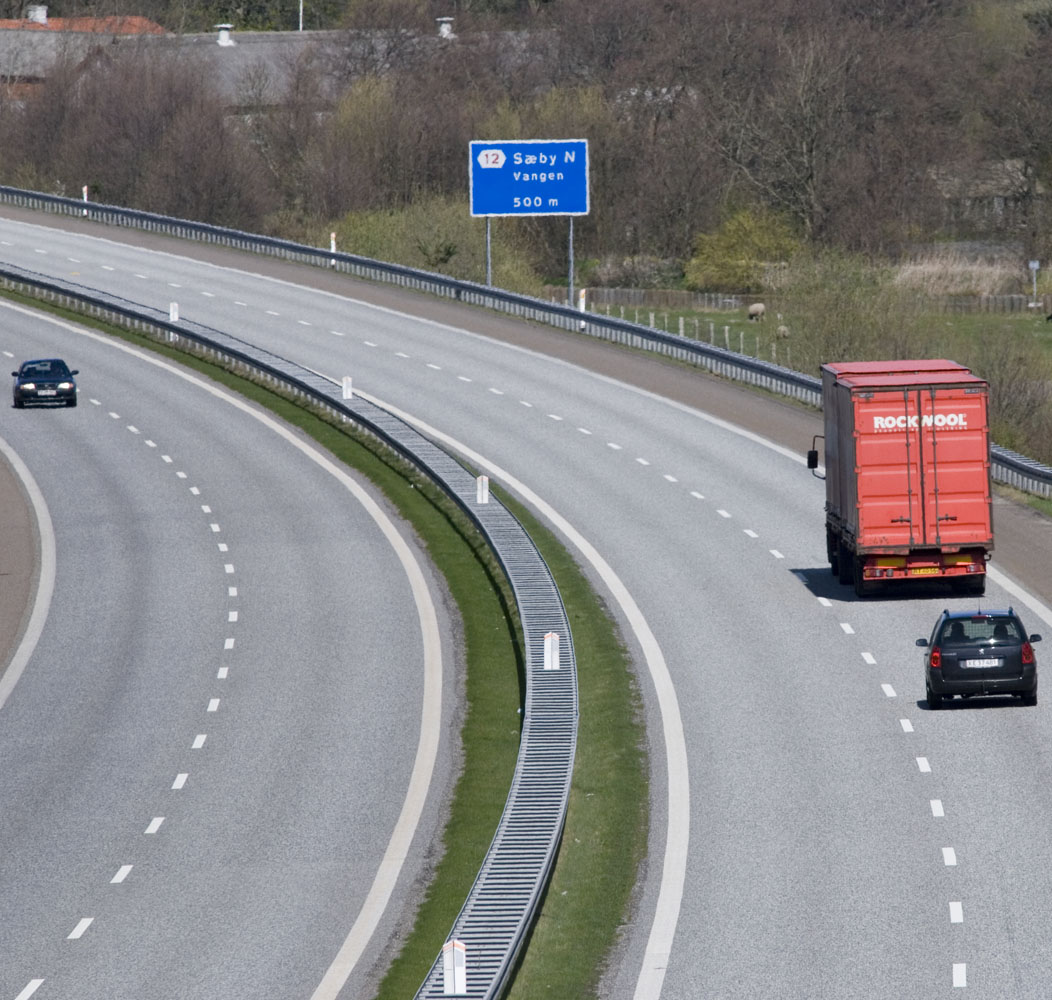
Northernmost exit on the Danish part of E45; just south of Frederikshavn

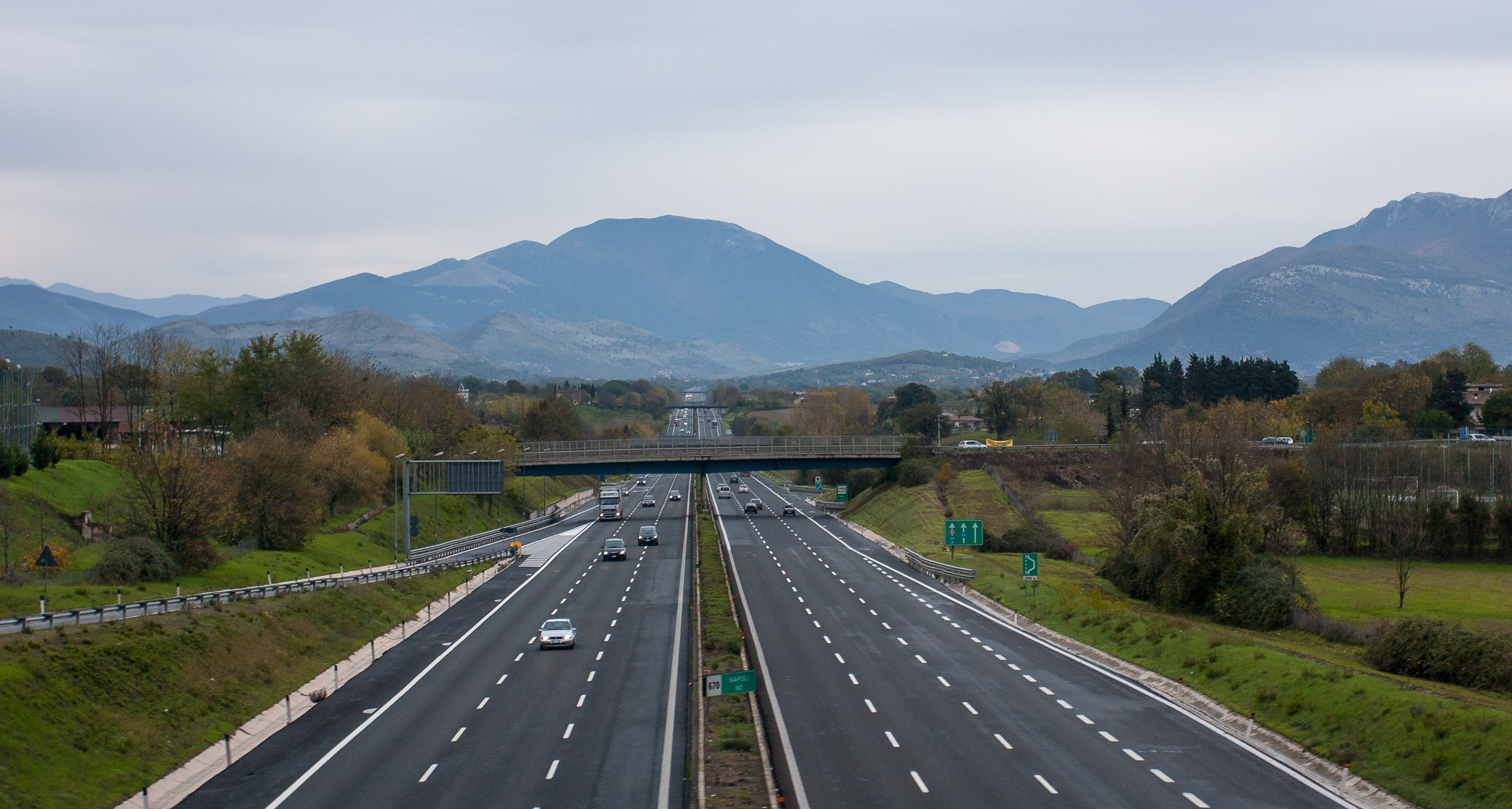
E45 near Cassino, Italy.

European route E45 connects Norway and Italy, through Finland, Sweden, Denmark, Germany and Austria. With a length of about 5,190 kilometres (3,225 mi), it is the longest north–south European route (some east–west routes are longer).

The route passes through Alta (Norway) – Kautokeino – Hetta (Finland) – Palojoensuu – Kaaresuvanto – Gällivare (Sweden) – Porjus – Jokkmokk – Arvidsjaur – Östersund – Mora – Säffle – Åmål – Brålanda – Gothenburg ... Frederikshavn (Denmark) – Aalborg – Randers – Aarhus – Skanderborg – Vejle – Kolding – Frøslev – Flensburg (Germany) – Hamburg – Hanover – Hildesheim – Göttingen – Kassel – Fulda – Würzburg – Nuremberg – Munich – Rosenheim – Wörgl (Austria) – Innsbruck – Brenner – Fortezza (Italy) – Bolzano – Trento – Verona – Modena – Bologna – Cesena – Perugia – Fiano Romano – Naples – Salerno – Sicignano – Cosenza – Villa San Giovanni ... Messina – Catania – Siracusa – Gela.

Unlike route E20 further east, there is no road connection between Denmark and Sweden; nor is there a road connection across the Strait of Messina between the Italian Peninsula and the island of Sicily. Ferries are used to transit these sections.

== Norway and Finland ==
E45 is 172 kilometres (107 mi) long in Norway and 101 kilometres (63 mi) long in Finland. It has no other number in Norway, but follows routes 21 and 93 in Finland.

The E45 was not signposted in Finland after the 2006 extension, since the official document uses the Swedish version ("Karesuando") of the name of the village at the Finnish–Swedish border, hinting that it would start on the Swedish side. The Swedish government proposed the extension alone in 2005 and let the E45 end at the border, partly because of lack of interest from Finnish authorities. The gap between the end of E45 and the European route E8 was about 1 km along the existing Finnish regional road 959 Karesuvanto (FIN) – Karesuando (SWE)

In August 2016, after a political proposal in 2007, the governments of Norway and Finland applied for an extension of E45 Karesuando–Kaaresuvanto–Palojoensuu–Hetta–Kautokeino–Alta. This was approved by the work group, and became valid on 5 December 2017. E45 sign posts were mounted starting 9 February 2018, replacing route 93 in Norway, and complementing road 959, 21 and 93 in Finland.

== Sweden ==
In November 2006, the E45 was extended with the then existing Swedish national road 45, which makes it start from Karesuando at the Swedish–Finnish border (near the E8), over Östersund–Mora–Grums, to Gothenburg and on. This extended the length of the route by about 1,690 km (1,050 mi). The signs of road 45 was changed to E45 during the summer of 2007. The E45 has now no other national number. In Sweden the road is called Inlandsvägen.

The E45 in Sweden is mostly a standard road. Between Karesuando and Torsby (1370 km) the road is usually 6–8 meters wide, and goes mostly through sparsely populated forests, with occasional villages and only two cities above 10,000 people, Östersund and Mora. The E45 is a motorway for 6 km together with the E18 south of Grums. Between Säffle and Trollhättan several parts of it is 2+1 road with a middle barrier, in total around 40 km. Between Trollhättan and Surte there is a 52 km long motorway, finished in 2012. Between Surte and Gothenburg there is a 17 km road designed equivalently to a motorway. The exception is that there are two gaps in the Trollhättan–Surte motorway and there are two traffic lights along the Surte–Gothenburg road. The speed limit is usually 100 km/h north of Mora and usually 90 km/h south thereof. There are 27 road crossings or intersections where the Swedish E45 does not follow the straight direction. There are 26 level crossings with railways. There are 19 motorway exits and 29 other motorway-like exits.

The E45 does not offer a direct road connection from Sweden to Denmark. Ferry services across the Kattegat run between Gothenburg in Sweden and the Danish town of Frederikshavn about six times a day and take 3.5 hours. Those who do not wish to travel by ferry can use E20 to get to the Øresund Bridge between Malmö in Sweden and Copenhagen in Denmark.

=== Bridge damaged and closed ===
On 29 September 2026 the Strömsund bridge was damaged and closed after a very heavy transport drove over it. Trafikverket (Swedish Transport Administration) had issued a license to transport a transformer unit weighing 100 tons to Mo i Rana in Norway. It is expected that the bridge will remain closed for at least one month for repairs.

== Denmark ==
In Denmark the E45 is a motorway (speed limit 110 to 130 km/h or 70 to 80 mph) from the south of Frederikshavn along the east coast of Jutland to the Denmark–Germany border. The E45 has no other national number. It connects to the E39 and E20 motorways.

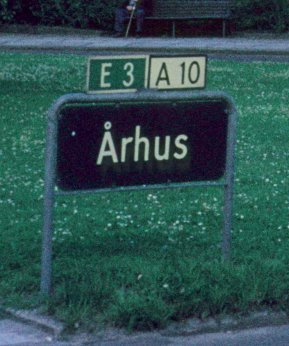
E3 in Denmark, before 1992: Changed to E45; the number E3 was re-attributed.

In 1992 it was renamed from E3 (which before 1985 ended in Lisbon, Portugal) and until 2006, with the extension in Sweden, the northern endpoint was Frederikshavn.

The total length in Denmark is 357 km.

=== Exits in Denmark ===
Name/Location	#	Destinations	Notes
Sæby N	12	Sekundærrute 180 Sæby, Vangen	
Rest area Øksenhede			
Sæby S	13	Sekundærrute 180 Sekundærrute 541 Sæby, Syvsten, to Sekundærrute 553	
Flauenskjold	14	Sekundærrute 589 Flauenskjold, Dybvad, Voerså	
Jyske Ås	15	Klokkerholm	
Hjallerup N	16	Sekundærrute 559 Hjallerup, Asaa, Dronninglund, to Sekundærrute 180	
Rest area Hjallerup Enge			Gas station on the east-side
Lyngdrup	17	Sekundærrute 180 Hjallerup, Grindsted	
Vodskov N	18	Vodskov, Langholt, to Sekundærrute 180	
Vodskov	19	Vodskov, Hals	
Bouet	20	Nørresundby, to E39 Primærrute 11 Primærrute 55 Sekundærrute 180	
Vendsyssel		E39 Primærrute 11 Brønderslev, Hjørring, Hirtshals, Thisted, to Primærrute 55 Sekundærrute 180	Northbound exit, southbound entrance
Nørresundby N	21	Nørresundby, Lindholm Aalborg Airport, to Sekundærrute 180	
Nørresundby C	22	Sekundærrute 180 Nørresundby	Northbound exit, southbound entrance
Limfjordstunnelen			582 metres (1,909 ft) length. Max height 4,3m
Aalborg N	23	Aalborg, Rørdal	Southbound exit, northbound entrance
Ø. Uttrup Vej	24	Aalborg, Rørdal	
Humlebakken	25	Vejgaard, Aalborg Ø	Southbound exit, northbound entrance
Th. Sauers Vej	26	Sekundærrute 507 Sekundærrute 595 Aalborg	
Aalborg C	27	Aalborg	Northbound exit, southbound entrance
Aalborg S	28	Sekundærrute 187 Aalborg, Skalborg	
Rest area Dall/Limfjorden			Restaurant on the west-side
Svenstrup	29	Sekundærrute 180 Svenstrup, Ellidshøj	
Støvring N	30	Støvring	
Støvring S	31	Sekundærrute 519 Støvring, Sørup	
Service area Himmerland			
Sønderup	32	Primærrute 13 Viborg, Aars	Southbound exit, northbound entrance
Haverslev	33	Sekundærrute 535 Haverslev, Arden	
Rest area Senhøj			
Hobro N	34	Primærrute 29 Sekundærrute 541 Hobro	
Hobro V	35	Sekundærrute 579 Hobro	
Onsild	36	Sekundærrute 517 Sekundærrute 555 Onsild, Viborg, Mariager	
Handest	37	Sekundærrute 180 Handest, Hobro	
Rest area Glenshøj			
Purhus	38	Purhus, Fårup	
Randers N	39	Sekundærrute 180 Sekundærrute 507 Randers, Hadsund	
Randers C	40	Primærrute 16 Randers, Viborg	
Rest area Gudenå			
Randers S	42	Primærrute 46 Randers	
Sønder Borup	43	Primærrute 16 Primærrute 21 Sekundærrute 180 Sekundærrute 511 Grenaa, Ebeltoft, Sønder Borup, Hadsten, Sjællands Odde	
Hadsten	44	Sekundærrute 587 Hadsten, Ebeltoft, Grenaa Aarhus Airport	
Århus Nord		Primærrute 15 Århus N, Grenaa, Ebeltoft, Skejby, Sjællands Odde	
Århus N	46	Sekundærrute 505 Hinnerup, Lisbjerg	
Tilst	47	Primærrute 26 Tilst, Viborg	
Tilst		Primærrute 26 Viborg (planned)	
Rest area Pedersminde/Blankhøj			
Århus Vest		Primærrute 15 Århus, Silkeborg, Herning	
Århus S	49	Århus, Hasselager Sjællands Odde	Southbound exit, northbound entrance
Hørning	50	Hørning, Hasselager	Southbound exit, northbound entrance
Århus Syd		Sekundærrute 501 Hasselager, Hørning, Viby J, Sjællands Odde	Northbound exit, southbound entrance
Skanderborg N	51	Sekundærrute 511 Skanderborg, Stilling	
Rest area Fuglsang			
Skanderborg V	52	Sekundærrute 511 Skanderborg, Ry, Odder	
Skanderborg S	53	Sekundærrute 409 Skanderborg, Østbirk, Nørre Snede	Southbound exit, northbound entrance
Ejer Bavnehøj	54	Ejer Bavnehøj	
Horsens N	55	Sekundærrute 461 Horsens, Østbirk	
Horsens V	56	Primærrute 52 Horsens, Juelsminde, Silkeborg	
Horsens C	56b	Horsens, Hatting	
Horsens S	57	Primærrute 30 Sekundærrute 451 Horsens, Odder, Billund Billund Airport	
Rest area Merring/Nørremark			
Hedensted	58	Hedensted, Løsning	
Hornstrup	59	Primærrute 23 Hornstrup, Vejle N	
Vejle		Primærrute 18 Primærrute 13 Herning, Viborg	
Vejle N	60	Sekundærrute 170 Vejle, Juelsminde	
Vejle C	61a	Primærrute 28 Vejle, Fredericia, Billund	
Vejle S	61b		
Service area Skærup			
Skærup		E20 Odense	Southbound exit, northbound entrance
Kolding		E20 Odense	Northbound exit, southbound entrance. Concurrency with E20 begins
Kolding Ø	62	Sekundærrute 170 Sekundærrute 176 Kolding, Billund Billund Airport	
Bramdrupdam	63	Bramdrupdam	
Kolding Vest	64	E20 Kolding, Varde, Esbjerg	Concurrency with E20 ends
Rest area Hylkedal			
Kolding S	65a	Primærrute 25 Kolding, Vamdrup, Tønder	
Vonsild	65b	Vonsild	
Christiansfeld	66	Christiansfeld	
Haderslev N	67	Haderslev	
Vojens	68	Primærrute 47 Vojens, Ribe, Haderslev Vojens Airport	
Service area Ustrup			
Haderslev S	69	Sekundærrute 435 Haderslev, Tønder	
Rest area Øster Løgum			
Aabenraa N	70	Primærrute 24 Aabenraa, Rødekro, Ribe	
Rest area Årslev			Restaurant on east-side
Aabenraa	71	Primærrute 41 Aabenraa	Southbound exit, northbound entrance
Aabenraa S	72	Primærrute 42 Aabenraa, Tinglev	
Kliplev		Primærrute 8 Sønderborg, Fynshav	
Kliplev	73	Primærrute 8 Sekundærrute 481 Kliplev, Tønder, Gråsten, Tinglev, Ribe	
Rest area Oksekær			
Kruså	74	Kruså, Flensburg	Southbound exit, northbound entrance
Bov	75	Sekundærrute 401 Bov, Tønder, Padborg, Kruså, Egernsund	
Padborg	76	Padborg, Frøslev	Southbound exit, northbound entrance
Service area Frøslev			
Padborg	76	Padborg, Frøslev	Northbound exit, southbound entrance

== Germany ==
The E45 follows:

- A7, Danish border–Würzburg
- A3, Würzburg–Nuremberg
- A9, Nuremberg–Munich
- A99, Munich Beltway
- A8, Munich–Rosenheim
- A93, Rosenheim–Austrian border

The length in Germany is 1,022 km.

Between Nuremberg and Verona, Italy the E45 corresponds with the route of the old imperial road, the Via Imperii, though the Autobahns are newer roads.

== Austria ==
The E45 follows:

- Inn Valley Autobahn A12, German border–Innsbruck
- Brenner Autobahn A13, Innsbruck–Italian border (at Brenner Pass)

The length in Austria is 109 km.

== Italy ==
Owing to the greater recognition of motorways and nationally or locally numbered major roads in Italy, in colloquial usage "E45" often refers to the Cesena-Orte segment, possibly further expanded to include the Ravenna-Cesena section of the SS3bis (formally part of the E55, and forming together the Strada di Grande Comunicazione Ravenna-Orte) and/or the Orte-Rome segment.

Although one has been proposed, there is no road connection across the Strait of Messina between Villa San Giovanni on the Italian mainland and Messina on the island of Sicily. There are frequent ferry services between the two ports.

== Route ==
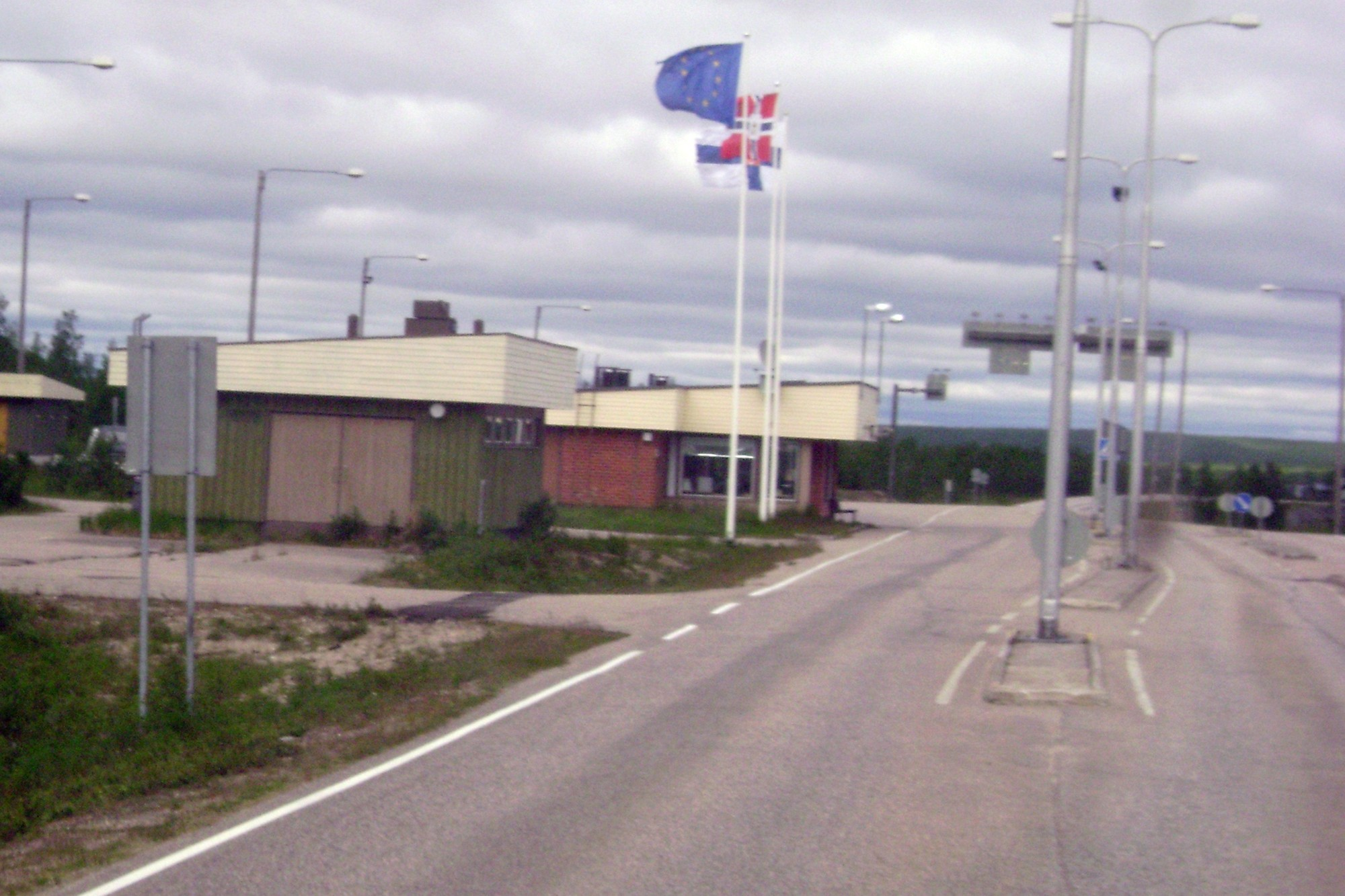
Finland–Norway border station

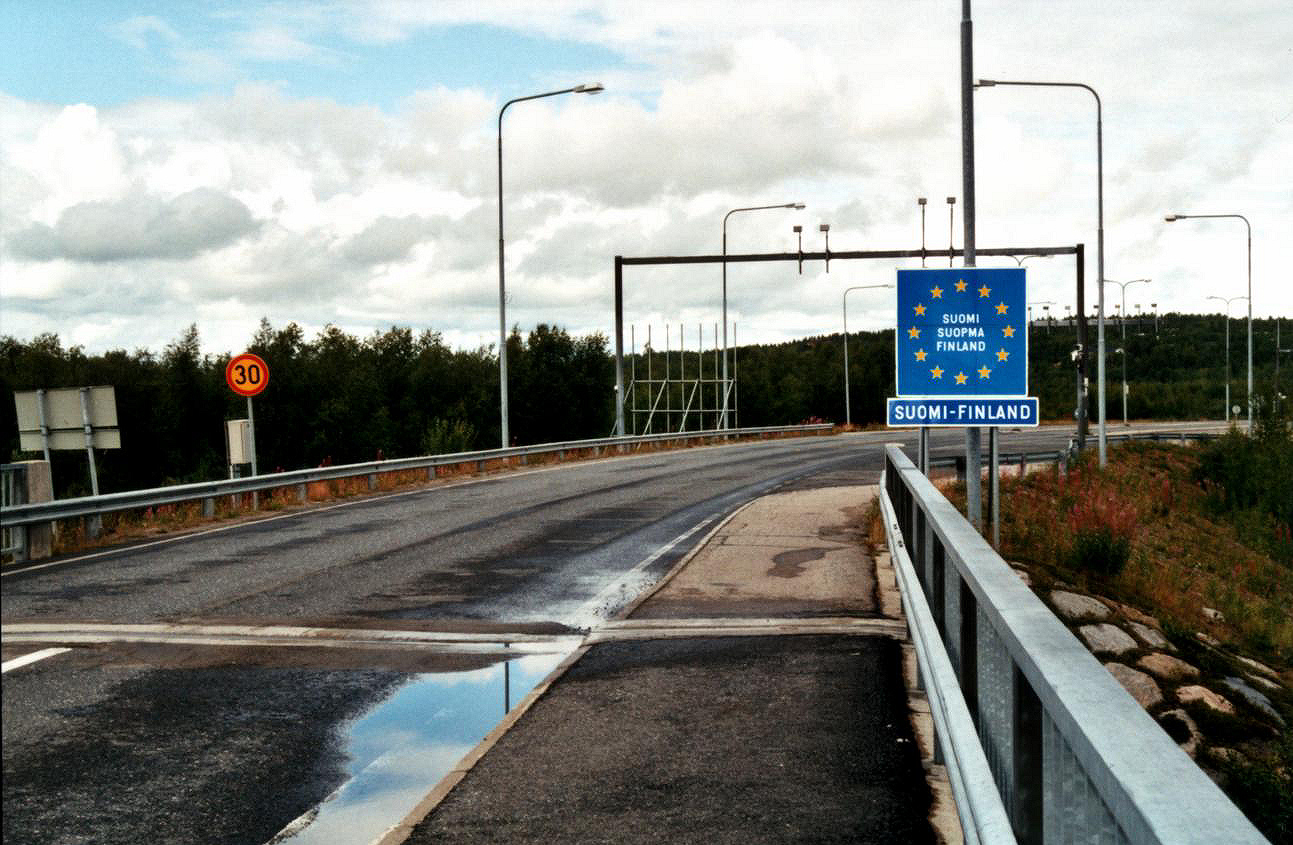
Finland–Sweden border crossing point, Kaaresuvanto/Karesuando

Norway

- E45: Alta – Kautokeino – Norway/Finland border

Finland

- Kt 93: Norway/Finland border – Hetta – Palojoensuu
- Vt 21 / E8: Palojoensuu – Kaaresuvanto
- St 959: Kaaresuvanto – Finland/Sweden border

Sweden

- E45: Karesuando – Svappavaara (Start of Concurrency with E10) – Gällivare (End of Concurrency with E10) – Arvidsjaur – Storuman (Start of Concurrency with E12) – Stensele (End of Concurrency with E12) – Håxås – Östersund (Start of Concurrency with E14) – Brunflo (End of Concurrency with E14) – Sveg – Mora – Malung (Start of Concurrency with E16) – Stöllet – Önneby – Torsby (End of Concurrency with E16) – Vålberg – Åmål – Trollhättan – Gothenburg
- Gothenburg (Sweden) – Fredrikshavn (Denmark)

Denmark

- E45: Fredrikshavn – Aalborg – Randers – Aarhus – Horsens – Vejle – Kolding – Haderslev – Aabenraa – (Denmark) / (Germany) border

Germany

- A 7: (Denmark) / (Germany) border – Flensburg – Neumünster – Hamburg – Hanover – Hildesheim - Göttingen – Kassel – Fulda – Würzburg
- A 3: Würzburg – Nuremberg
- A 9: Nuremberg – Ingolstadt – Munich
- A 99: Munich
- A 8: Munich – Rosenheim
- A 93: Rosenheim – (Germany) / (Austria) border

Austria

- A 12: (Germany) / (Austria) border – Kufstein – Wörgl (Start of Concurrency with E60) – Wiesing – Innsbruck (End of Concurrency with E60)
- A 13: Innsbruck – Matrei am Brenner – (Austria) / (Italy) border

Italy

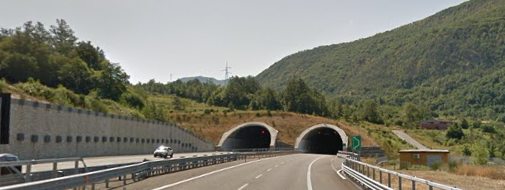
European route 45 near Lauria, Italy

- A 22: (Austria) / (Italy) border – Brennero – Vipiteno – Bolzano – Trento – Rovereto – Verona – Mantua – Modena (Start of Concurrency with E35)
- A 1: Modena – La Stanga (End of Concurrency with E35)
- A 14: La Stanga – Bologna – Cesena
- SS 3bis: Cesena – San Piero in Bagno – Sansepolcro – Città di Castello - Umbertide – Perugia – Todi – Terni
- SS 675: Terni – Narni – Orte
- A 1: Orte – Nazzano – Monterotondo – Frosinone – Caserta – Afragola – Casalnuovo di Napoli – Casoria – Naples
- A 3: Naples – Pompeii – Salerno
- A 2: Salerno – Battipaglia – Cosenza – Vibo Valentia – Villa San Giovanni
- Villa San Giovanni – Messina
- A 18: Messina – Taormina – Giarre – Catania
- RA 15: Catania
- A CT-SR (Autostrada Catania-Siracusa): Catania – Mungina – Augusta
- SS 114: Augusta – Melilli – Syracuse
- A 18: Syracuse – Noto – Rosolini
- SS 115 – Rosolini – Modica – Ragusa – Comiso – Gela
