= Danish national road 21 =

Road in Denmark

Primary Route 21
- Primærrute 21
- Primærrute 21 highlighted red

Route information
- Length: 165 km (103 mi)

Major junctions
- From: Copenhagen
- To: Randers

Location
- Country: Denmark

Highway system
- Transport in Denmark; Motorways

Danish national road 21 is a road going from Copenhagen, Denmark to Randers, Denmark.

It starts at Ring 2 in Copenhagen as a motorway and turns into an expressway west of Holbæk, and ends in Randers close to E45.

== Route ==
- 1 Hvidovre
- Brøndby E47 / E55 Helsingør
- 2 Brøndbyvester Ring 3
- 3 Vallensbæk N
- Vallensbæk Ring 4 / E20 / E47 / E55 Odense, Rødby, Gedser
- 4 Roskildevej Ø Sekundærrute 156ø
- 5 Roskildevej V Sekundærrute 156v
- Taastrup Ring 4 Ballerup, Lyngby
- 6 Høje Taastrup C´
- 7a Høje Taastrup S Sekundærrute 243
- 7b Baldersbrønde
- 8 Fløng
- 9 Trekroner
- 10 Roskilde Ø Sekundærrute 156
- 11 Roskilde SØ Primærrute 6 / Sekundærrute 217
- 12 Roskilde S Primærrute 6 | Service area Roskilde
- 13 Ringstedvej Primærrute 14
- 14 Roskilde V
- | Kornerup
- 15 Gevninge Sekundærrute 155
- | Service area Torkildstrup
- 16 Kirke Sonnerup Primærrute 53
- Holbæk Primærrute 23 Kalundborg
- | Arnakke
- 18 Holbæk Ø Sekundærrute 155
- 19 Holbæk C Primærrute 57
- | Springstrup
- 20 Holbæk V Sekundærrute 155

Expressway begins

- Asnæs
- Vig
- Nykøbing Sjælland Sekundærrute 225

Expressway ends

- Odden Færgehavn
- Odden Færgehavn-Ebeltoft (Mols-Linien)
- Ebeltoft
- Primærrute 15
- Mørke
- Sekundærrute 180
- Primærrute 21 ends
