= Danish national road network =

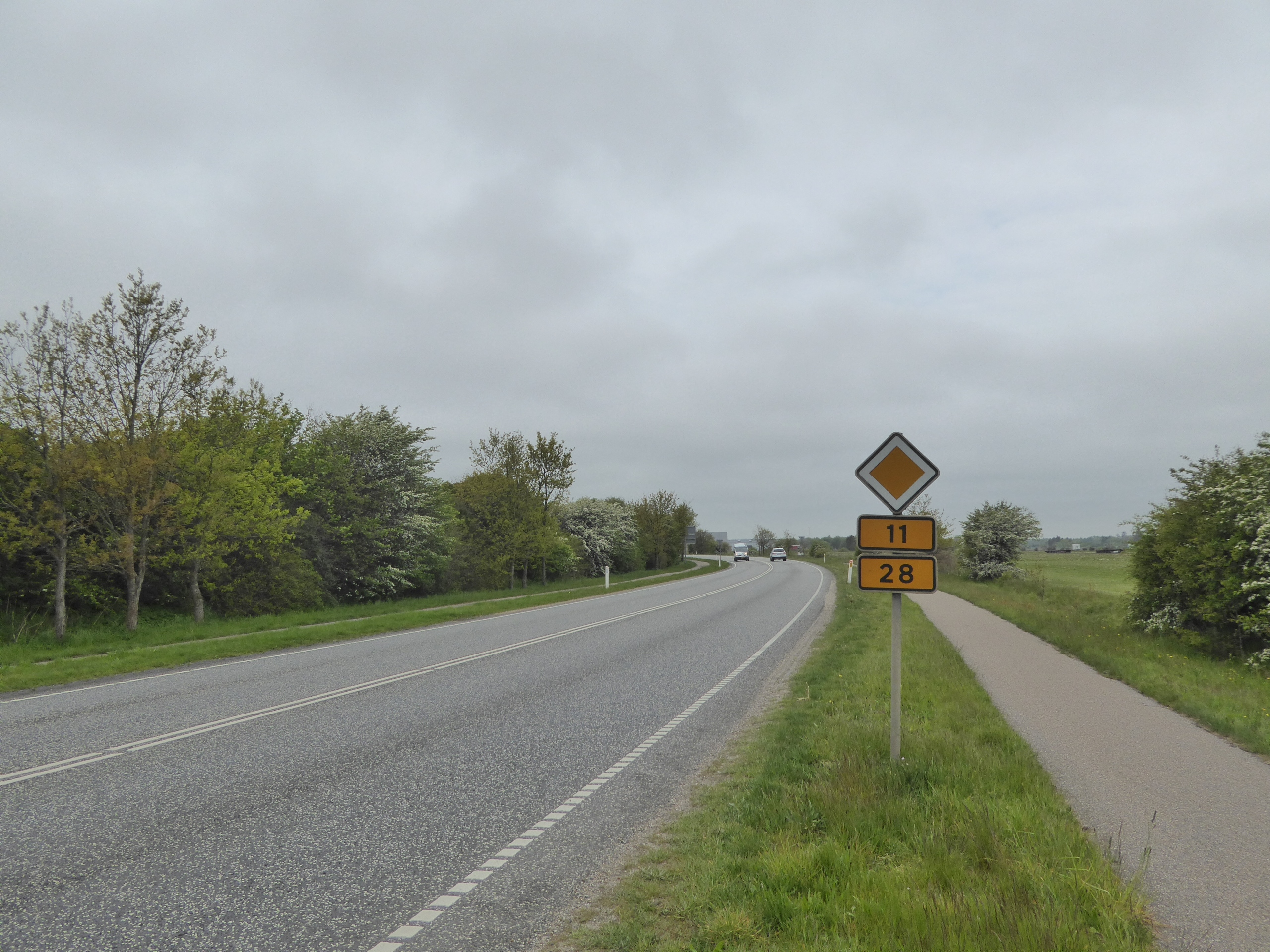
Primærrute 11 and 28 in Skjern

Map of primary routes in Denmark

The Danish national road network (Danish: Primærrute) is a numbering system for roads in Denmark developed by the Danish Road Directorate (Danish: Vejdirektoratet).

The roads are numbered from 6 to 99 and 01 to 04 for ring roads with Danish national road status. There are currently 37 Danish national roads, and 59 is currently the highest number. Signs are yellow with black numbers.

== National roads ==
Number	Length (km)	Length (mi)	Southern or western terminus	Northern or eastern terminus	Formed	Removed
Primærrute 6	81	50	Køge	Helsingør	—	—
Primærrute 8	139	86	Nyborg	Tønder	—	—
Primærrute 9	126	78	Odense	Nykøbing Falster	—	—
Primærrute 11	349	217	Sæd	Nørre Uttrup	—	—
Primærrute 12	129	80	Esbjerg	Viborg	—	—
Primærrute 13	138	86	Vejle	Rold Skov	—	—
Primærrute 14	49	30	Roskilde	Næstved	—	—
Primærrute 15	203	126	Grenaa	Søndervig	—	—
Primærrute 16	361	224	Copenhagen	Ringkøbing	—	—
Primærrute 17	9	5.6	Ejby	Høje-Taastrup	—	—
Primærrute 18	109	68	Vejle	Holstebro	—	—
Primærrute 19	41	25	Copenhagen	Hillerød	—	—
Primærrute 21	165	103	Valby	Randers	—	—
Primærrute 22	105	65	Kalundborg	Vordingborg	—	—
Primærrute 23	77	48	Roskilde	E45	—	—
Primærrute 24	89	55	Aabenraa	Esbjerg	—	—
Primærrute 25	72	45	Tønder	Kolding	—	—
Primærrute 26	178	111	Aarhus	Hanstholm	—	—
Primærrute 28	183	114	Fredericia	Lemvig	—	—
Primærrute 29	92	57	Hobro	Hanstholm	—	—
Primærrute 30	91	57	Esbjerg	Horsens	—	—
Primærrute 32	41	25	Ribe	Lunderskov	—	—
Primærrute 34	47	29	Herning	Skive	—	—
Primærrute 35	38	24	Hjørring	Frederikshavn	—	—
Primærrute 38	30	19	Rønne	Neksø	—	—
Primærrute 40	45	28	Frederikshavn	Skagen	—	—
Primærrute 41	29	18	Sønderborg	Aabenraa	—	—
Primærrute 42	17	11	Sønderborg	Stubbæk	—	—
Primærrute 43	26	16	Odense	Faaborg	—	—
Primærrute 44	25	16	Faaborg	Svendborg	—	—
Primærrute 46	45	28	Silkeborg	Randers	—	—
Primærrute 47	22	14	Haderslev	Gabøl	—	—
Primærrute 52	93	58	Juelsminde	Viborg	—	—
Primærrute 53	45	28	Hillerød	Kirke Sonnerup	—	—
Primærrute 54	19	12	Næstved	Rønnede	—	—
Primærrute 55	77	48	Aalborg	Hirtshals	—	—
Primærrute 57	34	21	Holbæk	Sorø	—	—
Primærrute 59	21	13	Vordingborg	Stege	—	—

== National ring roads ==
Number	Length (km)	Length (mi)	Southern or western terminus	Northern or eastern terminus	Formed	Removed
Ring 2	26	16	Ring road around central Copenhagen		—	—
Ring 2	20	12	Ring road around Hillerød		—	—
Ring 3	19	12	Ishøj	Buddinge	—	—
Ring 4	11	6.8	Greve	Gentofte	—	—
Ring 5	—	—	Proposed ring road		proposed	—
Proposed and unbuilt
