= Motorways in Denmark =

The sign indicating motorways is green in Denmark

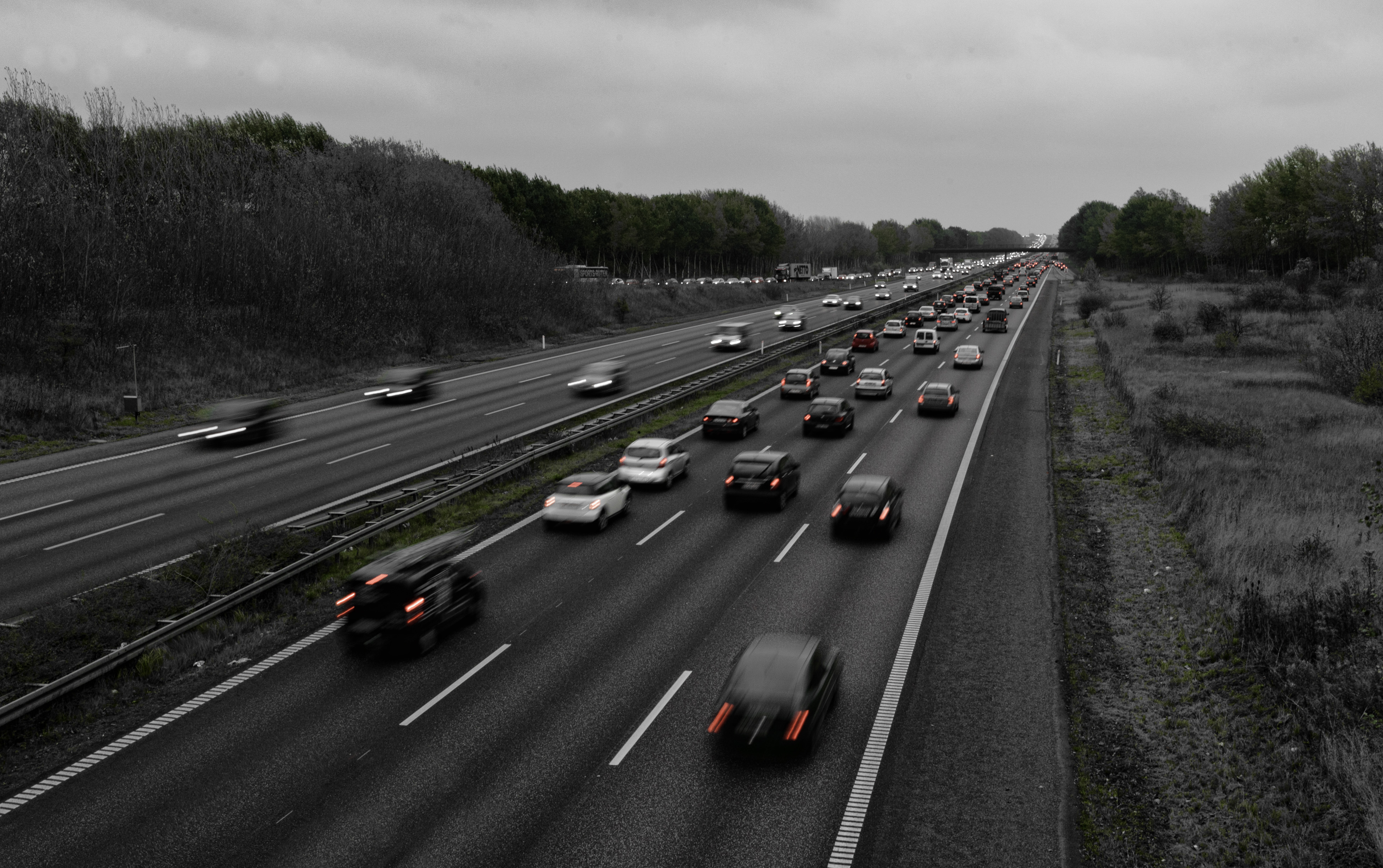
Morning rush hour on motorway E20, near Copenhagen.

There are over 1000 km of motorways in Denmark. They are all numbered and have formal names. The first motorway in Denmark opened in 1956 with the name Hørsholmvejen. Today this motorway is called Helsingørmotorvejen and is numbered E47.

All the Danish motorways are managed by Vejdirektoratet.

== List of motorways ==
Motorways in Denmark

Main motorway routes labelled

=== Motorways in Denmark ===
Jutland

- E45 Frederikshavnmotorvejen (Nørresundby - Frederikshavn)
- E39 Hirtshalsmotorvejen (Nørresundby - Hirtshals)
- Primærrute 11 Thistedgrenen (Nørresundby – Høvejen)
- Nørresundbygrenen Nordjyske Motorvej (exit 22 Hjørringvej)
- Kridtsvinget Nordjyske Motorvej (exit 23 – Østre Allé)
- Ådalsmotorvejen Nordjyske Motorvej (exit 27 – Sønderbro)
- Mariendalsmøllemotorvejen Nordjyske Motorvej (exit 28 – Hobrovej)
- E45 Nordjyske Motorvej (Aarhus - Aalborg)
- E45 / E20 Østjyske Motorvej (New Little Belt Bridge - Aarhus)
- 501 Aarhus Syd Motorvejen (Aarhus Syd – Viby J)
- Primærrute 15 502 Messemotorvejen (Herning Ø - Sinding)
- Primærrute 15 Herningmotorvejen (Aarhus - Herning)
- Primærrute 15 Silkeborgmotorvejen (Låsby- Funder)
- Primærrute 15 Djurslandmotorvejen (Aarhus - Løgten)
- Primærrute 18 Holstebromotorvejen (Sinding - Holstebro N)
- Primærrute 18 Midtjyske Motorvej (Vejle N - Herning N)
- E20 Esbjergmotorvejen (Kolding - Esbjerg)
- E20 Taulovmotorvejen (Kolding - Fredericia)
- E45 / E20 Sønderjyske Motorvej (Skærup - Padborg)
- Primærrute 8 Sønderborgmotorvejen (Kliplev - Sønderborg)

Funen

- E20 Fynske Motorvej ( New Little Belt Bridge - Great Belt Fixed Link )
- Primærrute 9 Svendborgmotorvejen (Odense - Svendborg)

Zealand / Lolland-Falster

- E55 / E47 / Primærrute 19 Helsingørmotorvejen (Copenhagen - Helsingør)
- 201 Lyngbymotorvejen Kgs. Lyngby – Virum
- Primærrute 16 Hillerødmotorvejen (Copenhagen - Allerød)
- E47 / E55 Motorring 3 (Avedøre - Kgs Lyngby)
- Primærrute 17 Frederikssundmotorvejen (Rødovre - Tværvej) N
- Ring 4 Motorring 4 (Ballerup - Ishøj)
- Primærrute 21 Holbækmotorvejen (Copenhagen - Holbæk)
- Primærrute 23 Kalundborgmotorvejen (Elverdam - Dramstrup)
- E20 Øresundsmotorvejen (exit 20 - Øresundsbroen)
- E20 Amagermotorvejen (Avedøre - exit 20)
- E20 / E47 / E55 Køge Bugt Motorvejen (Avedøre - Køge)
- E20 Vestmotorvejen (Køge - Great Belt Fixed Link )
- E47 / E55 Sydmotorvejen (Køge - Rødbyhavn)

=== Motorways under construction ===
- E45 Østjyske Motorvej (Aarhus S - Aarhus N) (extension 4 to 6 lanes) (2027)
- E45 Østjyske Motorvej (Vejle N - Skanderborg S) (extension 4 to 6 lanes) (2027)
- Primærrute 16 Hillerødmotorvejen (Allerød S – Hillerød N) (Expressway extension to the motorway) (2027)
- Primærrute 23 Kalundborgmotorvejen (Dramstrup - Kalundborg) (2028)
- E47 Fehmarn Belt Fixed Link Sydmotorvejen (Rødbyhavn - Puttgarten) (2029)

=== Motorways in planning ===
Danish motorways are developed by the Danish Road Directorate (a state-owned company) who maintain a list of motorway projects in development and planning (in Danish).

- E45 Sønderjyske Motorvej (Kolding V - Motorway junction Kolding) (extension 4 to 6 lanes and 6 to 8 lanes) (EIA-assessment) (2028)
- E47 Amagermotorvejen - Helsingørmotorvejen (extension 6 to 8 lanes) (EIA-assessment) (2029)
- E20 Amagermotorvejen (Motorvejskryds Avedøre - Øresundsmotorvejen) (extension 6 to 8 lanes) (EIA-assessment) (2029)
- E20 Øresundsmotorvejen (exit 20 København C - exit 17 Lufthavn V) (extension 4 to 6 lanes) (east) and 6 to 8 lanes) (west) (feasibility study starts) (2029)
- E20 Fynske Motorvej (Odense V - Odense SØ) (extension 4 to 6 lanes) (EIA-assessment) (2030)
- Ring 4 Motorring 4 (Ishøj – Vallensbæk) (extension 6 to 8 lanes) (feasibility study starts (2031)
- Primærrute 17 Frederikssundmotorvejen (Tværvej N – Frederikssund S) (EIA-assessment) (2032)
- Primærrute 54 Næstvedmotorvejen (Næstved - Rønnede) (EIA-assessment) (2033)
- Primærrute 18 Midtjyske Motorvej (Herning N - Sinding) (Expressway extension to the motorway) (EIA-assessment) (2033)
- Primærrute 16 Hillerødmotorvejen (Ring 4 – Farum) (extension 4 to 6 lanes) (EIA-assessment) (2033)
- Primærrute 13 Hærvejsmotorvejen (Løvel - Klode Mølle) (EIA-assessment) (2034)
- Primærrute 13 Hærvejsmotorvejen (Give - Billund V) (EIA-assessment) (2034)
- E39 3. Limfjordsforbindelse (Aalborg S - Aalborg N) (EIA-assessment) (2034)
- Primærrute 16 Hillerødmotorvejen (Motorring 3 – Ring 4) (extension 4 to 6 lanes) (feasibility study starts)
- E47 / Primærrute 19 Helsingørmotorvejen (Isterød - Hørsholm S) (extension 4 to 6 lanes) (EIA-assessment)
- E20 / E45 Taulovmotorvejen (Kolding V - Fredercia S) (extension 4 to 6 lanes) (EIA-assessment)
- E45 Østjyske Motorvej (Aarhus N - Randers N) (extension 4 to 6 lanes) (EIA-assessment)
- Primærrute 15 Messemotorvejen (Herning V - Snejbjerg) (Expressway extension to the motorway) (EIA-assessment)
- Primærrute 13 Hærvejsmotorvejen (Haderslev – Billund V) (EIA-assessment end)
- Primærrute 13 Hærvejsmotorvejen (Hobro - Løvel and Klode Mølle - Give) (feasibility study end)
- Primærrute 14 Roskildemotorvejen (Ringsted - Roskilde) (feasibility study starts)
- Primærrute 21 Holbækmotorvejen (Ring 4 - Roskilde) (extension 6 to 8 lanes) (feasibility study starts)
- Ring 5 Motorring 5 (Køge - Frederikssundmotorvejen) (feasibility study initiated)

=== Extreme points and longest constructions ===
- Northernmost point on a motorway: E39 near Hirtshals
- Westernmost point: E20 near Esbjerg
- Easternmost point: E20 on the Øresund Bridge
- Southernmost point: E47 near Rødbyhavn
- Highest point: E45 near Tebstrup, 120 m
- Longest motorway bridge: Eastern Great Belt Bridge, 6790 m
- Longest motorway tunnel: Øresund tunnel, 4050 m

== See also ==
- Transport in Denmark
- List of controlled-access highway systems
- Evolution of motorway construction in European nations
