= Otto Jensen =

Otto Jensen may refer to:

- Otto Jensen (bishop), Norwegian bishop and politician
- Otto Jensen (cyclist), Danish cyclist
- Otto Møller Jensen, Danish child actor
