= Danish national road 15 =

Primary Route 15
- Primærrute 15
- Primærrute 15 highlighted red

Route information
- Length: 203 km (126 mi)

Major junctions
- From: Grenå
- To: Søndervig

Location
- Country: Denmark

Highway system
- Transport in Denmark; Motorways

Danish national road 15 (Danish: Primærrute 15) is a road in Denmark, starting at Grenå and ending at Søndervig. Part of it is motorway quality.

== Motorway Section ==
- Largest roundabout in Denmark
- Århus Vest E45
- 21 Harlev Sekundærrute 511
- 22 Skovby Sekundærrute 195
- 23 Galten
- 24 Låsby Sekundærrute 457 / Sekundærrute 455
- | Kalbygård Skov
- 26 Hårup Sekundærrute 195
- 27 Silkeborg Ø
- 28 Søholt Primærrute 46 / Sekundærrute 195
- 29 Høje Kejlstrup
- 30 Silkeborg N Primærrute 52
- 33 Funder Sekundærrute 195
- 35 Pårup Primærrute 13
- | Rønkilde
- 36 Bording
- 37 Ikast Ø Sekundærrute 185
- 38 Ikast C
- 39 HI-Park
- 40 Hammerum
- Herning Primærrute 18 / Primærrute 12
- Herning Syd Primærrute 18 / Primærrute 12
- 41 Lind Sekundærrute 184
- 42 Herning V Primærrute 12
- 43 Herning SV Sekundærrute 195 (planning)

Expressway begins

- Studsgård Sekundærrute 195

Expressway ends
