= European route E47 =

Road in trans-European E-road network

E47

Route information
- Length: 342 km (213 mi)

Major junctions
- South end: Lübeck, Germany
- North end: Helsingborg, Sweden

Location
- Countries: Germany; Denmark; Sweden

Highway system
- International E-road network; A Class; B Class

European route E47 is a road (part of the United Nations international E-road network) connecting Lübeck in Germany to Helsingborg in Sweden via the Danish capital Copenhagen. It is also known as the Vogelfluglinie (German) or Fugleflugtslinjen (Danish). The road is of motorway standard all the way except for 28 km (17 mi) in Germany and 6 km (4 miles) of city roads in Helsingør, Denmark; there are also two ferry connections.

== Improvements ==
A fixed link between Germany and Denmark was planned to have been completed by 2020, now delayed to 2029. It will be a tunnel rather than a bridge.

The road across Fehmarn will be widened from two to four lanes before the tunnel opens. A construction start ceremony was held for this on 25 August 2023.

Although a bridge-tunnel combination (the Øresund Bridge) has been constructed between Denmark and Sweden further south, a very frequent ferry service continues to operate between Helsingør in Denmark and the northern terminus of the E47 at Helsingborg in Sweden. There are plans to build a tunnel here as well, the HH Tunnel, which does not have any financing approved or time plan set.

== Other road numbers ==
The ferry route Helsingborg–Helsingør is part of E47 according to the UN definition, and signposted so in Denmark, but the ferry is not signposted with any road number in Sweden. The ferry was part of E4 until 1992, but was signposted so for several further years in Sweden.

The Danish E-roads have no other national numbers (the national number is the same as the E-number, here 47, but only the E-sign is posted). Between Helsingborg and Eskilstrup on the island of Falster, 160 km, the E47 shares road with the E55. Since 2018 E55 is not signposted between Helsingør and Køge. Between Køge and Copenhagen (29 km), also the E20 shares the same road. Danish roads 9 and 19 share roads with the E47 short parts.

In Germany the motorway has the national number BAB 1. The part without motorway has the national number B 207. This part is a kind of expressway without any roads crossing on the same level. It has a number of road crossings built like motorway exits.

At the introduction of the new numbering scheme in 1992, the E47 was originally devised to continue from Helsingborg northward through Sweden and Norway to Gothenburg, Oslo, Trondheim and finally Olderfjord, replacing almost all of the old European route E6. After negotiations between UNECE and the Swedish and Norwegian authorities, this plan was abandoned, and the E6 remains designated as such, both on signage and in the official documents, throughout its entire old length in Scandinavia (including the snippets Trelleborg–Malmö and Malmö–Helsingborg, which are concurrent with the E22 and the E20 respectively, and were never intended to become parts of the E47). A similar solution was made for the E4 through Sweden. These two roads are the most conspicuous exceptions to the rule that even numbers signify west-to-east E-roads.

== Exits and service areas in Denmark ==
E47 route

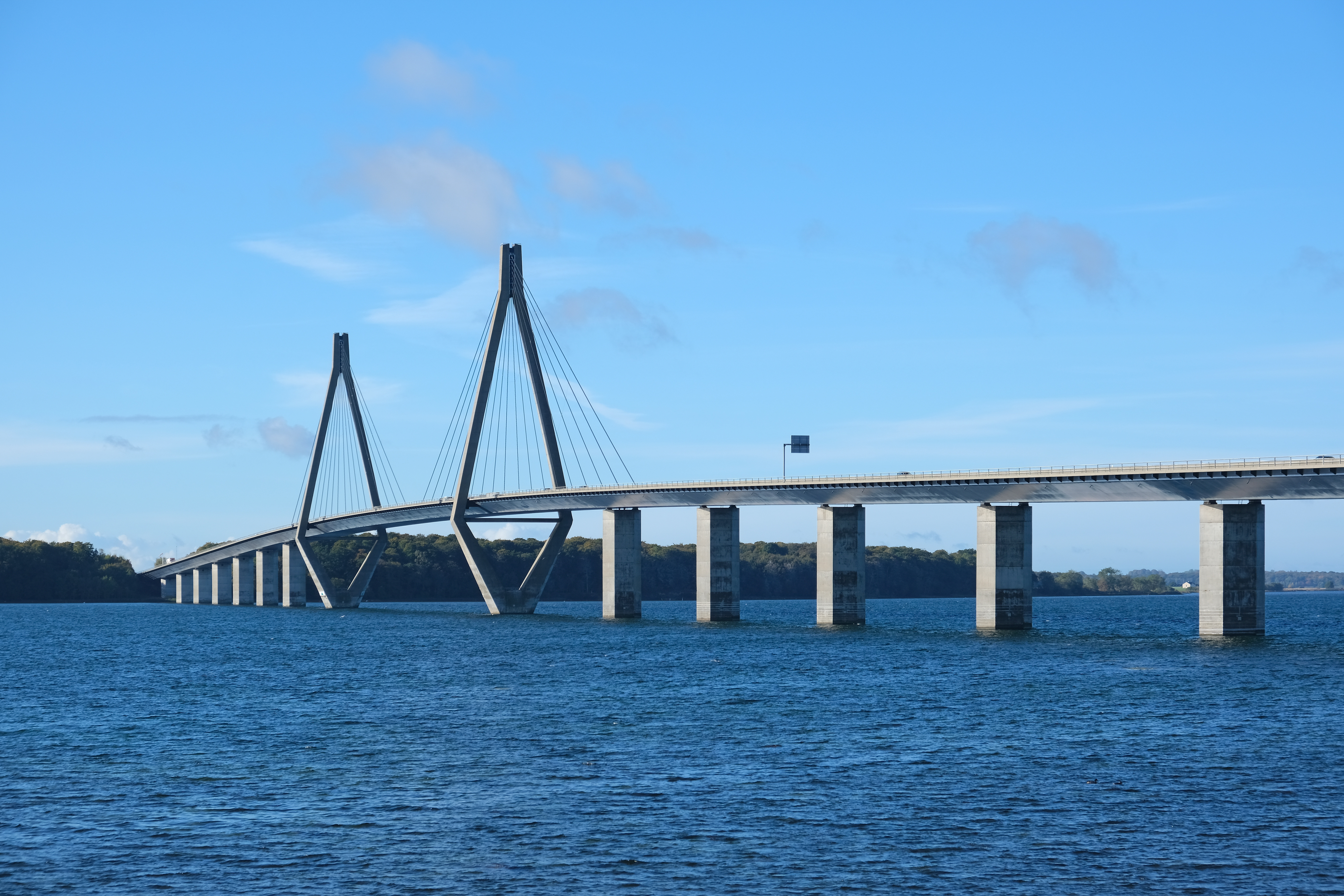
Southern Farø bridge

- 3 Espergærde
- 4 Kvistgård
- 5 Humlebæk
- 6 Nivå
- 7 Kokkedal
- 9 Hørsholm C
- | Isterød
- 10 Hørsholm S
- 12 Vedbæk
- 13 Gl. Holte
- 14 Nærum
- | Lærkereden/Storkereden
- 15 Lundtofte
- 16 Lyngby C
- Kgs. Lyngby Primærrute 19 København
- 17 Jægersborgvej
- 18 Nybrovej
- 19 Buddinge
- Gladsaxe Primærrute 16 Hillerød Primærrute 16 Copenhagen
- 20 Gladsaxe
- 21 Frederikssundvej
- 23 Jyllingevej
- Rødovre Primærrute 17 Frederikssund, Ring 4 Ballerup
- 24 Roskildevej
- Brøndby Primærrute 21 Roskilde Primærrute 21 Copenhagen
- Avedøre E20 Malmö
- 25 Vallensbæk S
- 26 Ishøj Strand
- Ishøj Ring 4 Ballerup, Primærrute 21 Ishøj
- 27 Greve N
- 28 Greve C
- 29 Greve S
- | Karlslunde
- 30 Solrød N
- 31 Solrød S Primærrute 6 Roskilde
- 32 Køge
- Køge Vest E20 Odense
- 33 Lellinge
- 34 Herfølge
- 35 Haslev
- | Piberhus
- 36 Bregentved
- Næstved Primærrute 54 Næstved (planned)
- 37 Rønnede Primærrute 54
- 38 Tappernøje |
- 39 Bårse
- 40 Udby
- 41 Vordingborg
- Northern Farø bridge
- 42 Farø
- Southern Farø bridge
- 43 Nørre Alslev
- 44 Eskildstrup E55 Nykøbing F, Gedser
- 45 Guldborg, Majbølle
- 46 Sakskøbing
- 47 Våbensted
- 48 Maribo Primærrute 9 Tårs (ferry port)
- 49 Holeby
- 50 Rødbyhavn

== Exits and service areas in Germany ==
Common with road 207

- 1 Puttgarden ferry port
- 2 Burg auf Fehmarn
- 3 Avendorf
- Fehmarn Sound bridge
- Petrol station
- 4 Großenbrode

Common with Bundesautobahn 1

- See the Bundesautobahn 1 article for the exit list.

== Termini ==
The northern terminus is at the ferry port in Helsingborg, where the European route E4 begins. The southern terminus is at E22 north of Lübeck.
