= Ring 5 (Copenhagen) =

Road in Denmark

Ring 5 (or O5/Motorring 5) is a proposed 5th ring road, built to motorway standards, around the city of Copenhagen. It is planned to be 70 km in length, running from the town of Køge to the south of the city to Helsingør in northern Zealand. The motorway is designed to divert heavy goods traffic outside of the city, providing more space on existing motorways, in particular Køge Bugt Motorvejen, Holbækmotorvejen, Motorring 3, Frederikssundmotorvejen, Hillerødmotorvejen, og Helsingørmotorvejen.

The motorway is planned to extend from the Køge Bugt motorway E47/E55/E20 and then west to Greve Strand and along a widened Tværvej. It will then connect to the Holbæk motorway and continue up towards Sengeløse to meet the Frederikssund motorway, the Hillerød motorway and Isterødvejen, ending with a connection to the existing Helsingør motorway south of the city. This would possibly then connect to a proposed link between Helsingør and Helsingborg in Sweden, the HH Tunnel

The proposed route has met considerable opposition in North Zealand, to the extent that only the southern part between Køge and the Frederikssund motorway is currently under consideration. The proposed road has proved politically divisive, with some local politicians backing the project to reduce traffic on the other motorways in Greater Copenhagen and others opposed on environmental grounds. In 2019, a 2-year feasibility study of this section was announced by the government.

The motorway was first proposed in the late 1970s, and in 1982 a 1 km wide strip of land running the length of the proposed route (a transport corridor) was reserved for its construction and/or a rail line by the authorities. This continued reservation has proved highly controversial for residents and businesses along the route that would be affected. As of 2019, Ring 5 remains a government development strategy for the Greater Copenhagen area.

== See also ==
- High-speed rail in Denmark
- Transportation in Denmark
- HH Tunnel
