= Danish national road 9 =

Road in Denmark

Primary Route 9
- Primærrute 9
- Primærrute 9 highlighted red

Route information
- Length: 126 km (78 mi)

Major junctions
- From: Odense
- To: Nykøbing Falster

Location
- Country: Denmark

Highway system
- Transport in Denmark; Motorways

Danish national road 9 (Danish: Primærrute 9) is part of the Danish national road network. It runs between Odense on Funen and Nykøbing Falster on Falster by way of Svendborg, Tåsinge, Siø and Langeland, and involves a ferry crossing between Langeland and Lolland.

== Route ==
The section of National road 9 between Odense and Svendborg follows the Svendborg Motorway. The route then continues across the islands of Tåsinge and Langeland to the small town of Spodsbjerg where there is a ferry service to Tårs on Lolland.

On Lolland, National road 9 continues east, joining Sydmotorvejen ("The South Motorway") just before Maribo and leaving it again at Sakskøbing. It then crosses the Frederick IX Bridge to Falster before reaching Nykøbing Falster.

== Motorway section ==
- Odense E20
- 11 Årslev Primærrute 43
- 12 Ringe N Sekundærrute 167
- 13 Ringe C Sekundærrute 167 / Sekundærrute 323
- | Groven/Dynden
- 14 Kværndrup Primærrute 8 / Sekundærrute 167
- 15 Kirkeby
- 16 Svendborg N Primærrute 44 Sekundærrute 163 / Sekundærrute 167
