= Palojoensuu =

Palojoensuu Northern Sami: Bálojohnjálbmi
- Village
- Location within Lapland Location within Finland
- Coordinates: 68°17′N 23°4′E
- Country: Finland
- Region: Lapland
- Municipality: Enontekiö
- Time zone: UTC+2 (EET)
  - Summer (DST): UTC+3 (EEST)

Palojoensuu (Northern Sami: Bálojohnjálbmi) is a village located in the municipality of Enontekiö, on the banks of the Muonio, with a population of about a hundred inhabitants. Those who are driving north from Muonio to Kilpisjärvi on Finnish national road 21 will reach the village of Karesuvanto. When driving south, the next village is Äijäjoki and then Sonkamuotka. Along the Main Road 93 leading from the village, the municipal center of Enontekiö Hetta can be reached, which is 26 kilometers away.
