= Funder =

Funder is a surname. Notable people with the surname include:

- Anna Funder (born 1966), Australian writer
- David C. Funder, American psychologist
- John Funder (born 1940), Australian medical researcher
- Kathleen Funder (1941 – 1998), Australian psychologist

== See also ==
- Fund (disambiguation)
