= Karesuvanto =

Kaaresuvanto Kaaresuvanto – Gárasavvon
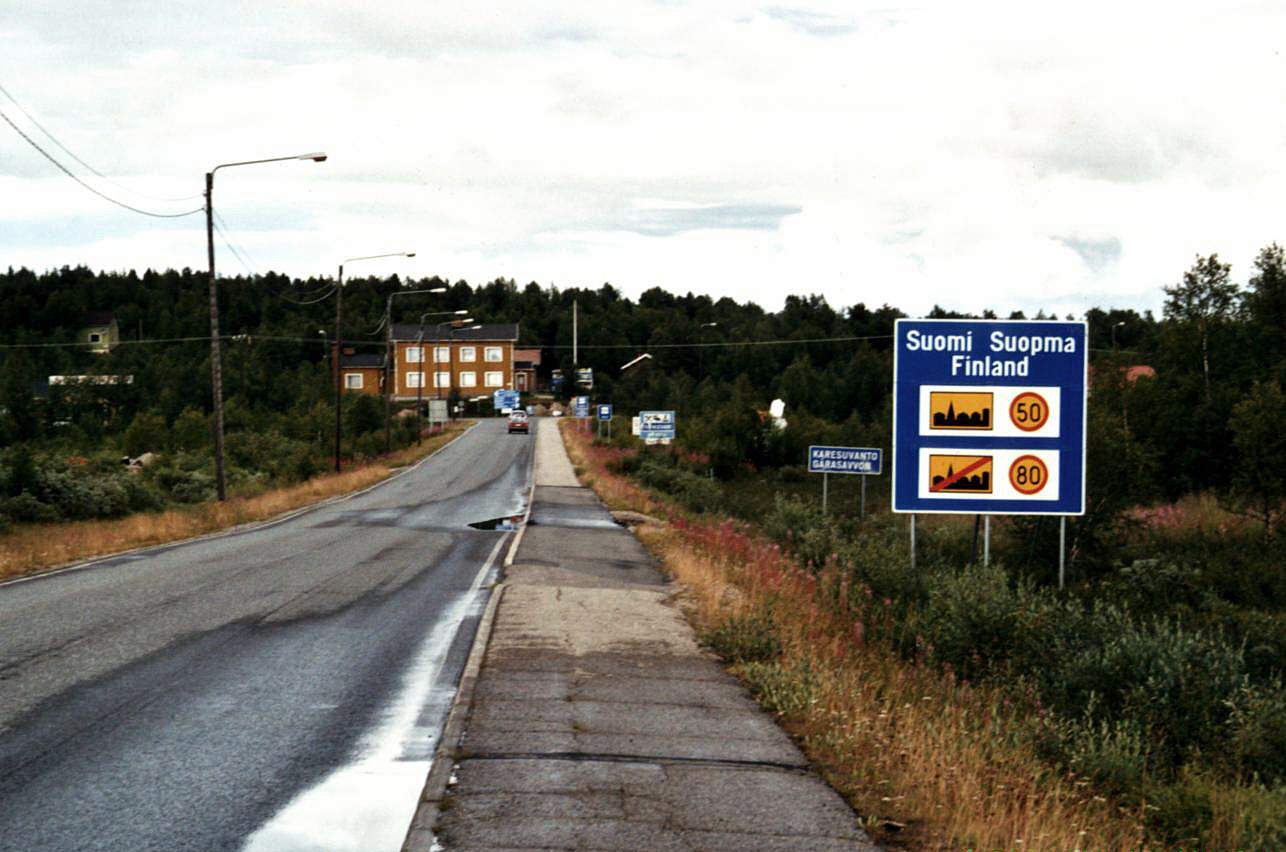
- Entering Finnish Kaaresuvanto from Sweden
- Interactive map of Kaaresuvanto
- Coordinates: 68°26′57″N 022°29′04″E
- Country: Finland
- Municipality: Enontekiö
- Region: Lapland

Population
  - Total: 140
- Time zone: UTC+2 (EET)
  - Summer (DST): UTC+3 (EEST)
- Postal code: 99470

Karesuvanto or Kaaresuvanto (Northern Sami: Gárasavvon, Swedish: Karesuando) is a village in Enontekiö municipality, located in Finnish Lapland, the largest and northernmost region in Finland. It is located on the Muonio River, which follows Finland's western border with Sweden.

The village of Karesuando (part of Kiruna municipality) is located on the Swedish side of the river. According to Finnish tradition the two are considered parts of the same locality (with a population of about 470), although officially a national border bisects them. The sides are linked by a road bridge built in 1980. The area is traditionally Finnish and Sami speaking. After the Finnish War in 1809, the border was re-drawn for political reasons, not because of any cultural or linguistic reasons existing at that time. Later a cultural and language difference grew because of school and church influences.

The village got its first buildings in 1670, when Måns Mårtensson Karesuando, called "Hyvä Maunu Martinpoika" in Finnish and "Good Maunu, Son of Martti" in English, bought land from Sami Henrik Nilsson Nikkas. The vicar and botanist Lars Levi Laestadius worked in Kaaresuvanto where he founded the Laestadian revival movement named after him. In 1944, the area was burnt down by German troops during the Lapland War and had to be rebuilt.

Kaaresuvanto is located on European route E8 from Tromsø to Turku and European route E45 which stretches from Alta in Norway to Gela in Italy.
