= Otto Jensen (cyclist) =

Danish cyclist

Personal information
- Born: 1 January 1893 Herning, Denmark
- Died: 25 December 1972 (aged 79) Trehøje, Denmark

Cycling career
- Sport: Cycling

Otto Jensen (1 January 1893 – 25 December 1972) was a Danish cyclist. He competed in two events at the 1912 Summer Olympics.
