= Herning =

City in Denmark

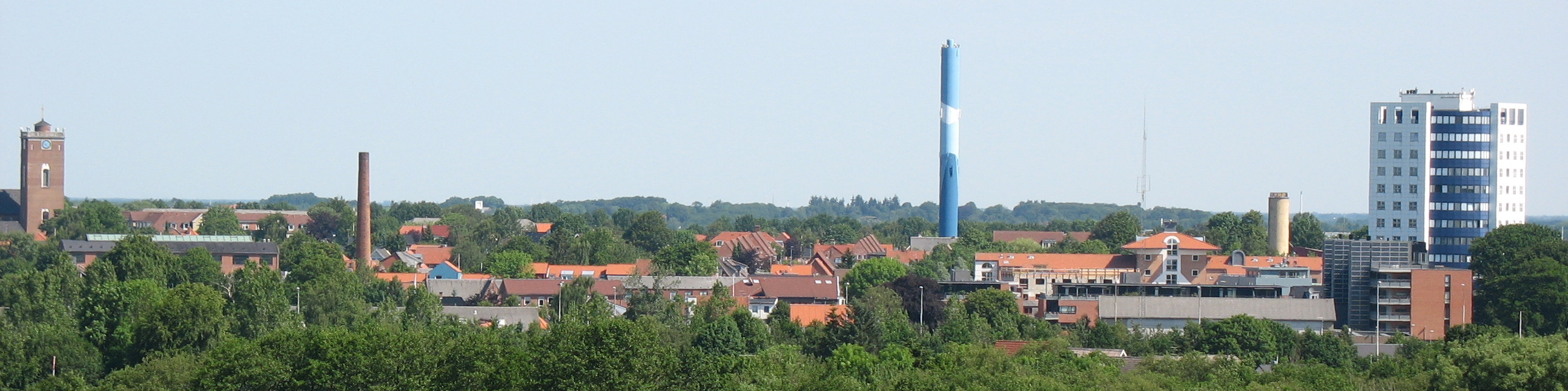
- Panorama of Herning

- Coat of arms

- Location in Denmark Herning (Central Denmark Region)
- Coordinates: 56°08′19″N 8°59′23″E
- Country: Denmark
- Region: Central Denmark
- Municipality: Herning

Government
  - Mayor: Dorte West

Area
  - Urban: 33.3 km^{2} (12.9 sq mi)
  - Municipality: 1,323.5 km^{2} (511.0 sq mi)
- Elevation: 58 m (190 ft)

Population (2026)
  - Urban: 52,264
  - Urban density: 1,570/km^{2} (4,060/sq mi)
  - Gender: 25,874 males and 26,390 females
  - Municipality: 90,546
- Demonym: Herningbo Herningenser
- Time zone: UTC+1 (Central Europe Time)
  - Summer (DST): UTC+2
- Postal code: DK-7400 Herning
- Area code: (+45) 9
- Website: herning.dk

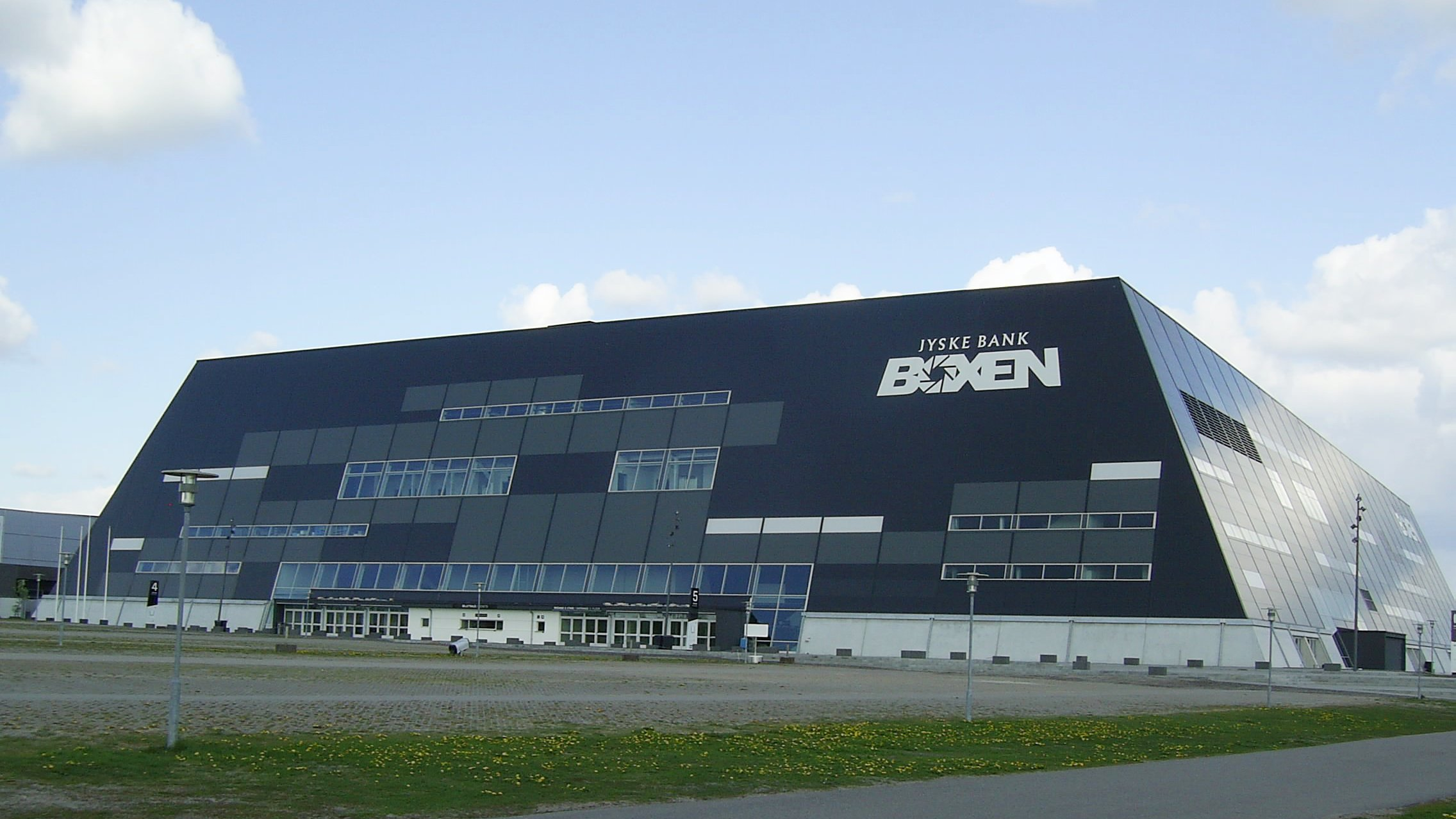
Jyske Bank Boxen in Herning.

Herning (Danish pronunciation: [ˈhɛɐ̯ne̝ŋ]) is a Danish town in the Central Denmark Region of the Jutland peninsula. It is the main town and the administrative seat of Herning Municipality. Herning has a population of 52,264 (1 January 2026) including the suburbs of Tjørring, Snejbjerg, Lind, Birk, Hammerum, and Gjellerup, making Herning the 12th most populous urban area in Denmark.

== History ==
Herning was established at the beginning of the 1790s, during the period of heath reclamation, as a commercial centre providing goods and services to the farmers in the area. A textile industry later developed in and around the town. This industry was once Herning's principal economic activity. Today, the town has a more diversified industrial base. Herning became a market town in 1913. Herning has twice been awarded the title of Danish City of the Year.

== Industry ==
There are many small furniture and textile businesses in and around Herning.

== Attractions ==
Herning is home to Messecenter Herning, the largest exhibition centre in Scandinavia, which hosts many trade fairs.

Carl-Henning Pedersen and Else Alfelt's Museum of Art (also known as Herning Art Museum) is located in the city.

The city is the site of three buildings designed by the architect Jørn Utzon. One is publicly owned and two are privately owned.

The town is also home to sculptor Ingvar Cronhammar's monumental work Elia. The sculpture is located near the Herning Art Museum.

The old Herningsholm Estate in Herning is open to the public for touring. Classensborg Estate, now called Skarrildhus, is located 25 km south of the town, but is closed to the public because it is a private hotel and educational facility. The grounds, however, can be toured and are known for their beautiful rhododendron displays during the spring.

The Herning Museum displays a history of Herning, as well as the development of moorland agriculture and ancient textile production. The museum operates traveling educational exhibits.

== Sports ==
Herning Blue Fox is a Danish professional ice hockey team playing in the top Danish ice hockey league, the Oddset Ligaen. Having won 16 championships and 29 medals in all (following the 2011–2012 season), Herning Blue Fox has accumulated the greatest number of victories in the history of professional ice hockey in Denmark.

FC Midtjylland is a football team playing in the Danish Superliga. It was formed in 1999 following a merger of Herning Fremad and Ikast FS and won the national championship of Denmark for the first time in 2015 having twice been the runner up. The club's fourth championship title was won following the conclusion of the 2023-24 Danish Superliga season. FC Midtjylland play their home matches at MCH Arena, which is situated next to the largest sports and concert venue in Denmark, Jyske Bank Boxen.

Herning also is a centre of Danish cycling. The GP Herning is a professional bicycle race held annually in Herning. The 2012 Giro d'Italia started in Herning. Bjarne Riis, first Dane to win the Tour de France, was born in Herning. Fourteen years after his win, Riis admitted using illegal performance-enhancing drugs for the competition; however, he retained the Trikot since the statute of limitations had already expired prior to his admission.

The finals of the 2019 World Men's Handball Championship and 2025 World Men's Handball Championship were played in Jyske Bank Boxen. The local handball team HC Midtjylland has previously played in the top league. In 2015 they won the Danish Handball Cup.

Herning hosted the FEI World Championships in 2022, which saw international equestrians compete in jumping, dressage, para-dressage and vaulting at the MCH Messecenter Herning.

== Climate ==
Climate data for Herning (Midtjyllands Airport) (1993–2020 normals, extremes 1971–2000)
Month	Jan	Feb	Mar	Apr	May	Jun	Jul	Aug	Sep	Oct	Nov	Dec	Year
Record high °C (°F)	11.3 (52.3)	12.2 (54.0)	22.2 (72.0)	26.8 (80.2)	28.4 (83.1)	30.1 (86.2)	32.7 (90.9)	34.6 (94.3)	27.8 (82.0)	23.0 (73.4)	16.0 (60.8)	12.3 (54.1)	34.6 (94.3)
Mean daily maximum °C (°F)	3.7 (38.7)	4.0 (39.2)	6.8 (44.2)	12.2 (54.0)	16.2 (61.2)	18.9 (66.0)	21.2 (70.2)	21.2 (70.2)	17.3 (63.1)	12.5 (54.5)	7.7 (45.9)	4.7 (40.5)	12.2 (54.0)
Daily mean °C (°F)	1.3 (34.3)	1.6 (34.9)	3.3 (37.9)	7.8 (46.0)	11.4 (52.5)	14.5 (58.1)	16.7 (62.1)	16.7 (62.1)	13.4 (56.1)	9.2 (48.6)	5.2 (41.4)	2.3 (36.1)	8.6 (47.5)
Mean daily minimum °C (°F)	−1.1 (30.0)	−0.9 (30.4)	−0.1 (31.8)	3.4 (38.1)	6.7 (44.1)	10.2 (50.4)	12.2 (54.0)	12.2 (54.0)	9.5 (49.1)	6.0 (42.8)	2.7 (36.9)	−0.1 (31.8)	5.1 (41.1)
Record low °C (°F)	−28.4 (−19.1)	−21.0 (−5.8)	−16.3 (2.7)	−7.8 (18.0)	−4.0 (24.8)	1.1 (34.0)	3.7 (38.7)	1.0 (33.8)	−2.3 (27.9)	−5.3 (22.5)	−18.0 (−0.4)	−24.0 (−11.2)	−28.4 (−19.1)
Average precipitation mm (inches)	67.7 (2.67)	45.9 (1.81)	55.5 (2.19)	40.8 (1.61)	48.1 (1.89)	63.3 (2.49)	59.3 (2.33)	68.7 (2.70)	84.5 (3.33)	86.7 (3.41)	81.1 (3.19)	77.0 (3.03)	778.5 (30.65)
Average precipitation days (≥ 1.0 mm)	12.6	9.6	11.2	8.2	8.0	9.6	9.4	10.3	12.2	12.8	13.9	13.9	131.6
Average snowy days	7.3	6.3	4.9	1.6	0.1	0	0	0	0	0.2	2.6	5.8	28.8
Average relative humidity (%)	89.7	86.7	82.6	74.5	73.2	74.9	77.3	80.1	84.5	87.3	90.8	97.7	83.3
Source 1: Danish Meteorological Institute (precipitation, sun and snow 1971–2000, humidity 2008–2020)
Source 2: IEM

== Transport ==
=== Rail ===
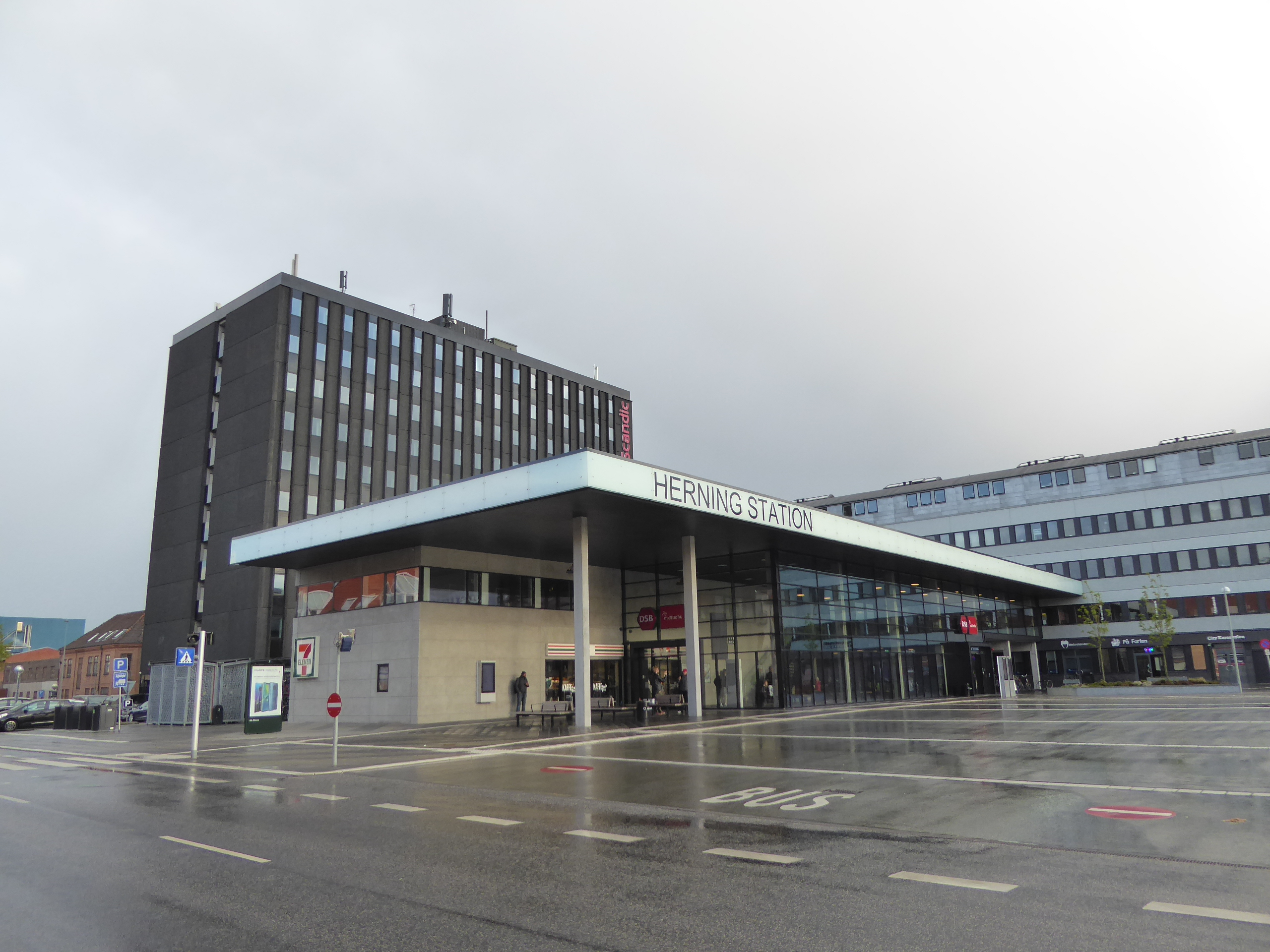
Herning railway station.

Herning is the hub for both road and rail transport in central Jutland. The rail lines crossing the peninsula intersect at Herning railway station, the principal railway station of the town, with connections to Vejle, Århus, Esbjerg and Holstebro. There are also several daily trains to Copenhagen. The town is also served by the railway halts Birk Centerpark and Herning Messecenter.

=== Roads ===
Herning lies at the intersection of three major roads: Route 18, that traverses the Jutland Peninsula from southeast to northwest; Route 15, that crosses the peninsula from Aarhus in the east to Ringkobing in the west; and Route 12, from Esbjerg in the southwest to Viborg to the northeast. A small part of Route 34 lies within city limits.

==== National Roads ====
- Primærrute 12, runs southwest to northeast through Herning. The road start at Esbjerg to the south and goes to Viborg in the north.
- Primærrute 15 runs east to west through Herning. To the east, National Road 15 goes through Silkeborg to Aarhus and to the west, Route 15 goes through Vidbaek and end at Ringkobing.
- Primærrute 18 runs southeast to northwest through Herning. Route 18 starts at Vejle in the south and passes through Brande before reaching Herning. Route 18 then continues northward until it reaches Holstebro.
- Primærrute 34, a small part of Route 34 lies on the northeastern edge of Herning. The road goes north through Haderup before reaching Skive.

=== Airport ===
Herning is served by Karup Airport situated 25 km (16 mi) to the northeast of the city. There are several flights a day connecting it to Copenhagen Airport.

== Notable people ==
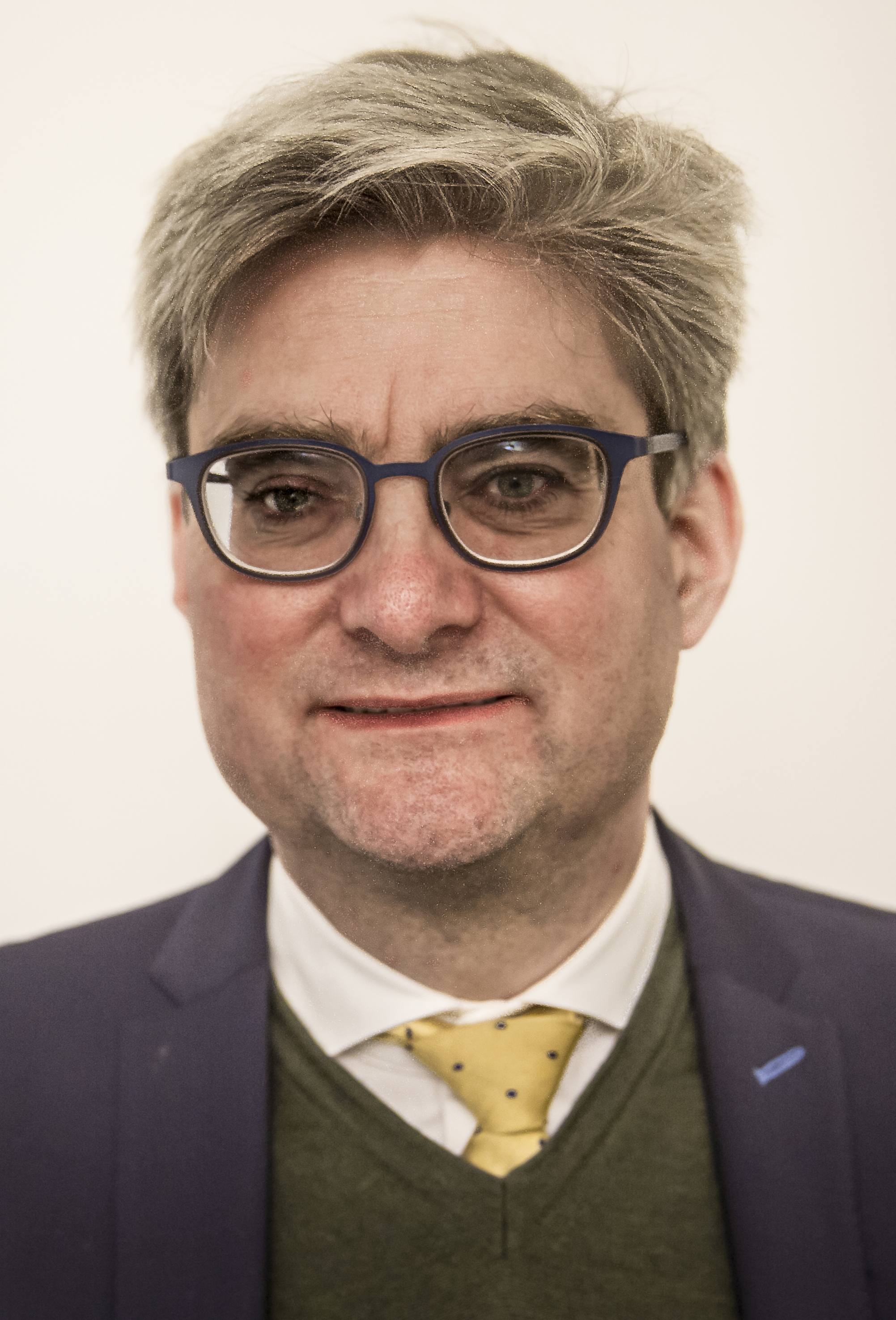
Søren Pind, 2017

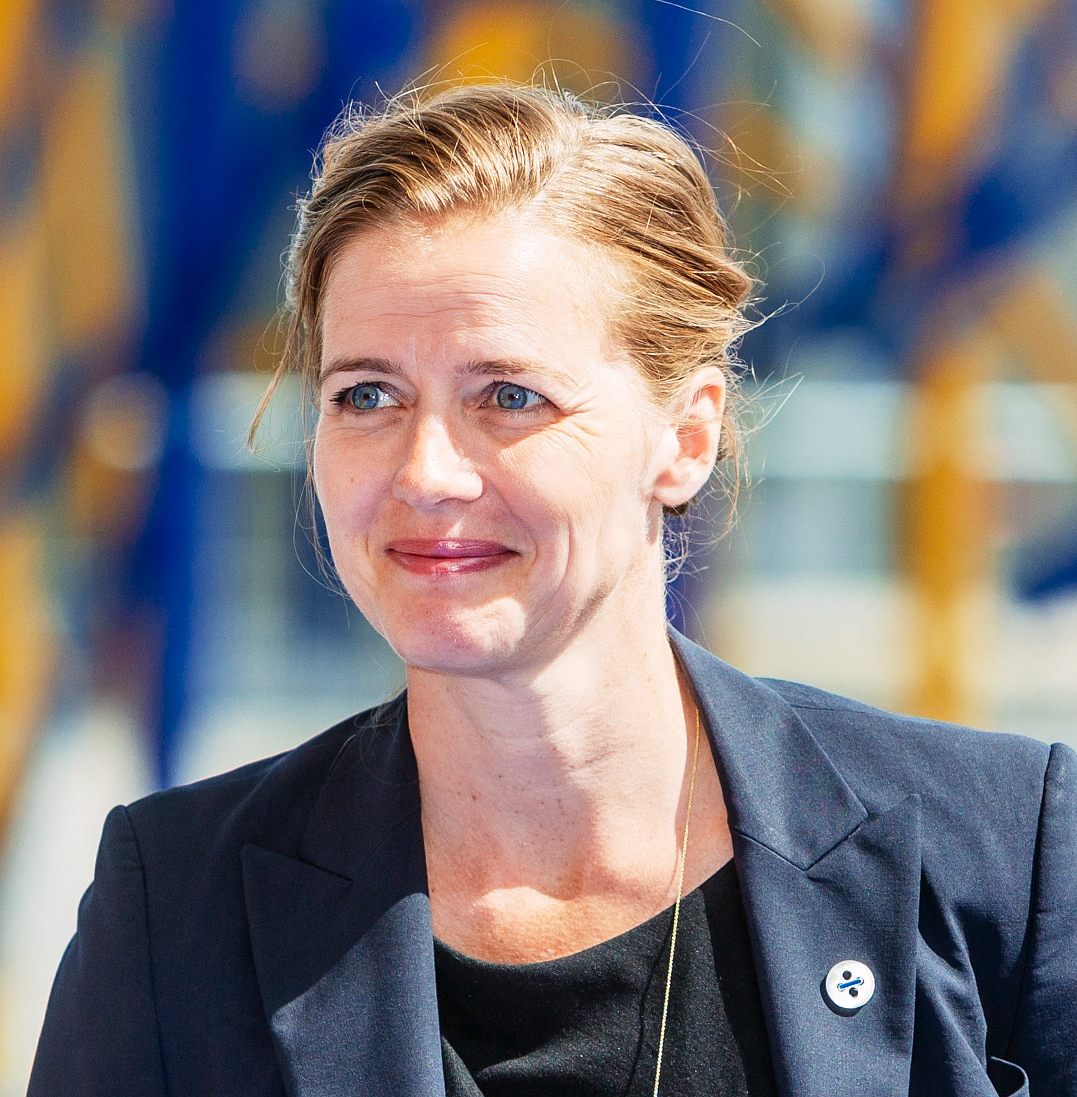
Ellen Trane Noerby, 2017

- Anton Marius Jenssen (1879–1967), Norwegian merchant and politician.
- Professor Gudmund Hatt (1884 in Vildbjerg – 1960), archaeologist and cultural geographer
- Captain Richard Gustav Borgelin (1887–1966), company commander of the Danish-Baltic Auxiliary Corps
- Børge Møller Grimstrup (1906 in Timring – 1972), film actor
- Niels Holst-Sørensen (born 1922), former athlete, air force officer and commander-in-chief of the Royal Danish Air Force
- Eva Sørensen (1940–2019), sculptor and ceramist of granite and marble works
- Lars Larsen (born 1948 in Arnborg), businessman, owner and founder of Jysk
- Helge Sander (born 1950 in Ørre), national politician and Mayor of Herning 1998 to 2001
- Kristine Jensen (born 1956), architect who has specialized in landscape architecture
- Claus Pilgaard (born 1965 in Tjørring), musician and entertainer
- Jesper Baehrenz (born 1965), radio & TV host, producer and board game developer
- Søren Pind (born 1969), lawyer and Venstre politician
- Dorthe Nors (born 1970), writer
- Ellen Trane Nørby (born 1980), Venstre politician, Minister of Health

=== Sport ===
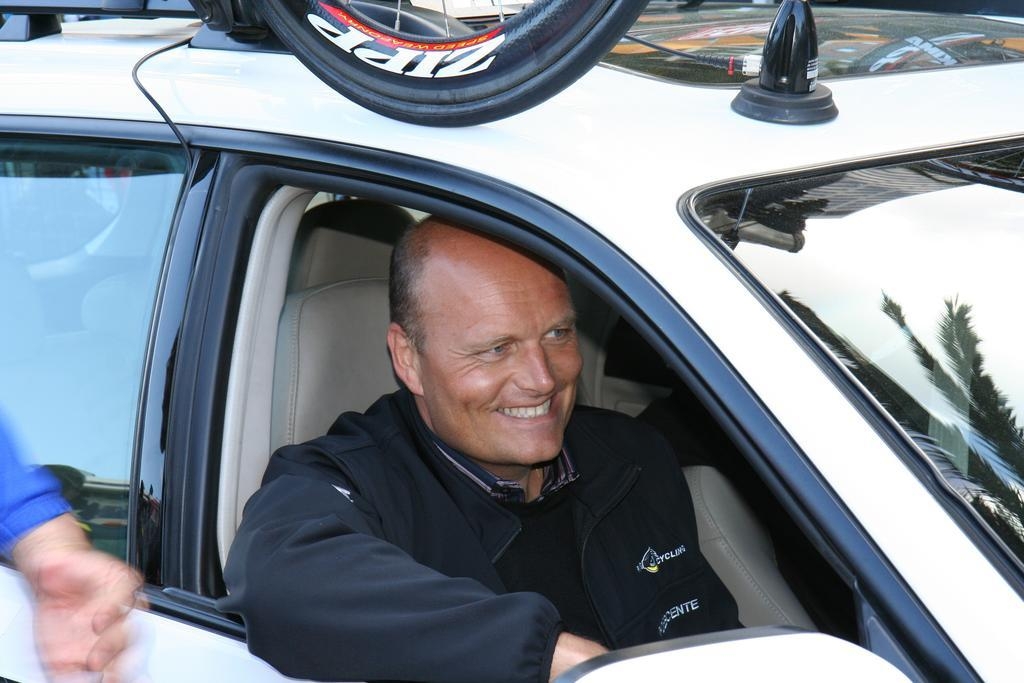
Bjarne Riis, 2007

- Otto Jensen (1893–1972), cyclist, competed in the 1912 Summer Olympics
- Kristen Nygaard (born 1949 in Sunds), former footballer, 363 club caps and 36 for Denmark
- Bjarne Riis (born 1964), former professional road bicycle racer
- Claus Elming (born 1969), former Danish American football player, TV host on TV 2 Sport
- Gitte Madsen [born 1969), former team handball player, team gold medallist at the 1996 Summer Olympics
- Michael Blaudzun (born 1973), former professional road bicycle racer
- Kenneth Jonassen (born 1974), badminton player
- Jesper Nøddesbo (born 1980), Danish-Norwegian handball player for FC Barcelona and Denmark
- Rasmus Ankersen (born 1983), Chairman of FC Midtjylland and a Director of Football at Brentford F.C. and author
- Frans Nielsen (born 1984), ic hockey player, the first Danish NHL player
- Michael Pedersen (born 1986), cricketer and former national team captain
- Frederik Andersen (born 1989), ice hockey player
- Kim Astrup (born 1992), badminton player
- Nicklas Jensen (born 1993), ice hockey player
- Nicklas Porsing (born 1993), speedway rider
- Oliver Bjorkstrand (born 1995), ice hockey player

Preceded by Zurich, Switzerland (1982)	World Gymnaestrada host city 1987	Succeeded by Amsterdam, The Netherlands (1991)
