= Helsingørmotorvejen =

Road in Denmark

Location
- Country: Denmark

Highway system
- Transport in Denmark; Motorways

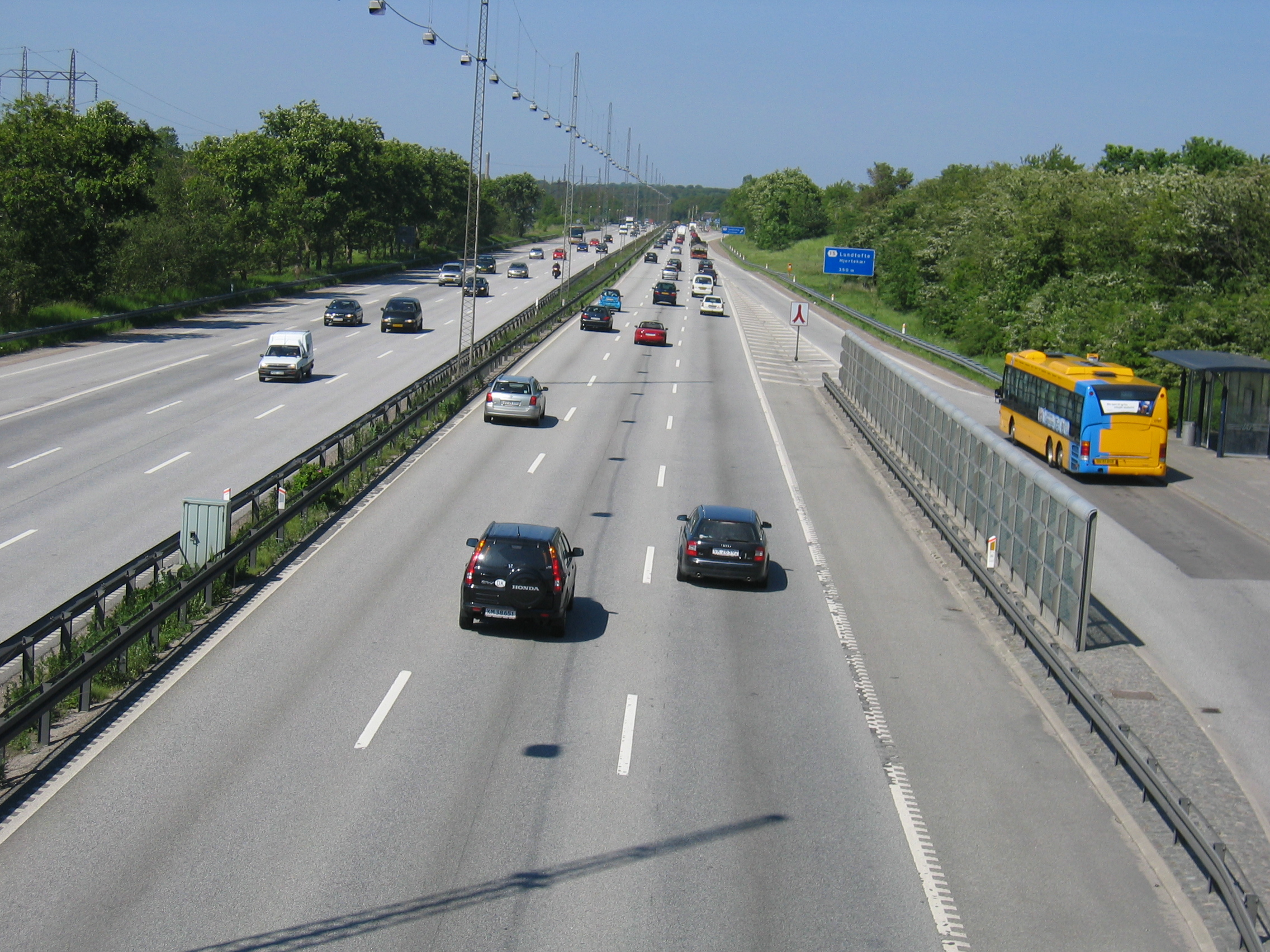
Helsingørmotorvejen

Helsingørmotorvejen is a highway in Sjælland, Denmark. It goes between Hans Knudsens Plads, Copenhagen to Helsingør.

On 27 September 2014, during a road work where parts of the highway would be extended from four to six total lanes, a bridge under construction collapsed on the highway; there were no injuries.
