= Ring 2 (Copenhagen) =

Road in Copenhagen, Denmark

Ring 2 is a ring road that surrounds the most central part of Copenhagen, Denmark. It is part of the Danish national road network. The total length of the road is about 26 km.

== Names ==
Road name (Danish)	District	Distance
	Hellerup	
Strandvejen	Hellerup	
Strandpromenaden	Østerbro	
Kalkbrænderihavnsgade	Østerbro	
Folke Bernadottes Allé		
Grønningen	City centre	
Store Kongensgade; Bredgade	City centre	
Kongens Nytorv	City centre	
Holmens Kanal	City centre	
Christians Brygge	City centre	
Kalvebod Brygge	Vesterbro	
Vasbygade	Kongens Enghave	
P. Knudsens Vej		
Ellebjergvej		
Folehaven		
Vigerslevvej	Valby	
Ålholmvej	Valby	
Grøndals Parkvej	Vanløse	
Rebildvej		
Hulgårdsvej	Bispebjerg	
Tomsgårdsvej		
