= Vodskov =

- town
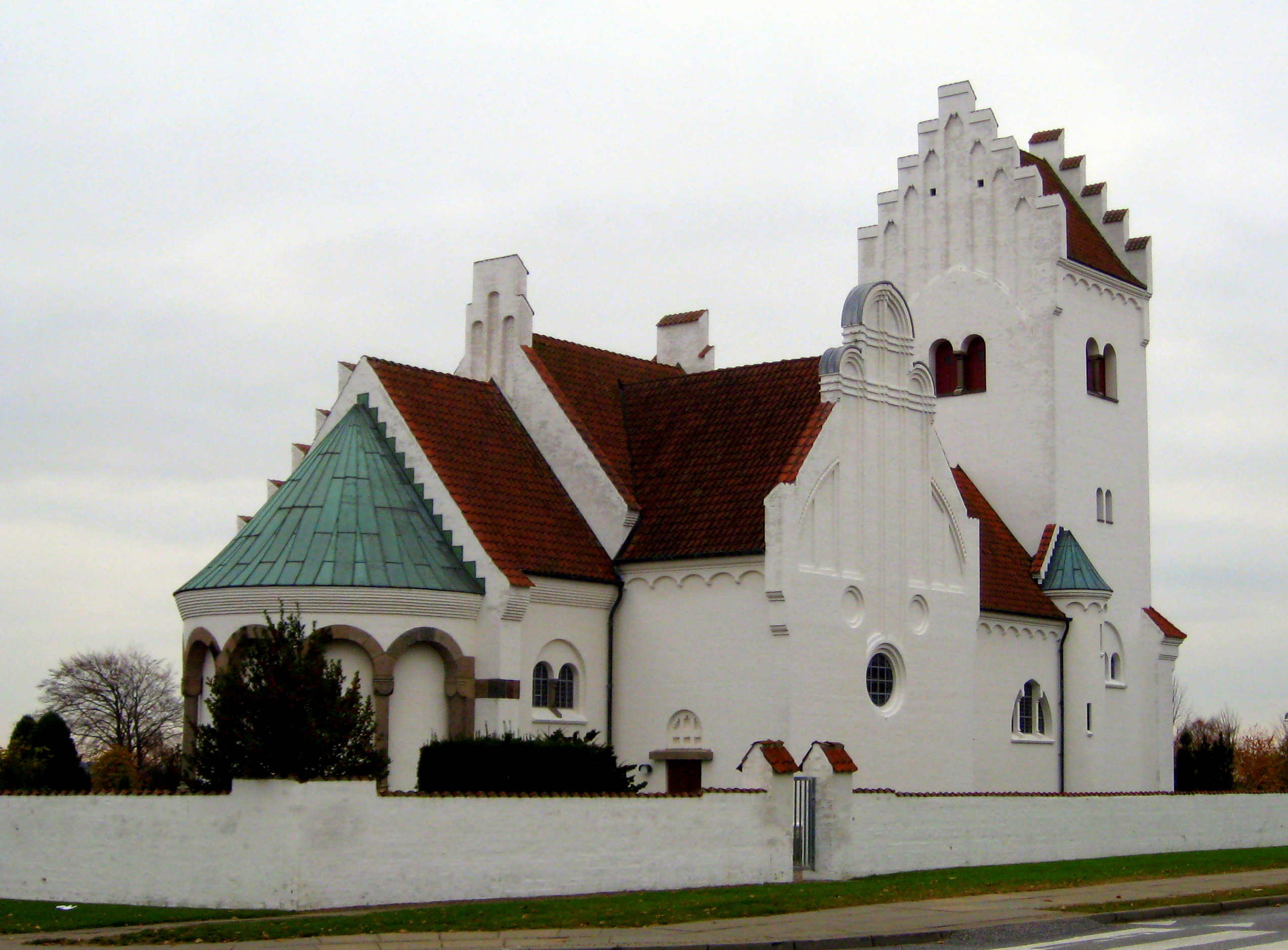
- Vodskov church

- Location in Denmark Vodskov (North Jutland Region)
- Coordinates: 57.10839°N 10.02715°E
- Country: Denmark
- Region: North Denmark (Nordjylland)
- Municipality: Aalborg

Area
  - Urban: 2.7 km^{2} (1.0 sq mi)

Population (2026)
  - Urban: 4,822
  - Urban density: 1,800/km^{2} (4,600/sq mi)
  - Gender: 2,345 males and 2,477 females
- Time zone: UTC+1 (CET)
  - Summer (DST): UTC+2 (CEST)
- Postal code: DK-9310 Vodskov

Vodskov is a village near Aalborg in southern Vendsyssel with a population of 4,822 (1 January 2026) in Vodskov parish, Aalborg Municipality. The town lies in North Jutland, 11 kilometre northeast of Aalborg.

== Transport ==
From 1899 Vodskov had a railway station on Sæbybanen of Vodskov-Østervrå railway, but this was closed on 15 March 1950.

== In Vodskov ==
In Hammer Bakker's south, just north of Vodskov, is found a number of residential and educational institutions in the area and for many years housed a large mental asylum.

In Vodskov there are many interesting places including Vodskov Church and Vodskov School, which is among Aalborg Municipality's largest public schools.
