= HH Tunnel =

Proposed tunnels between Helsingborg, Sweden and Denmark

Coordinates: 56.03°N 12.65°E

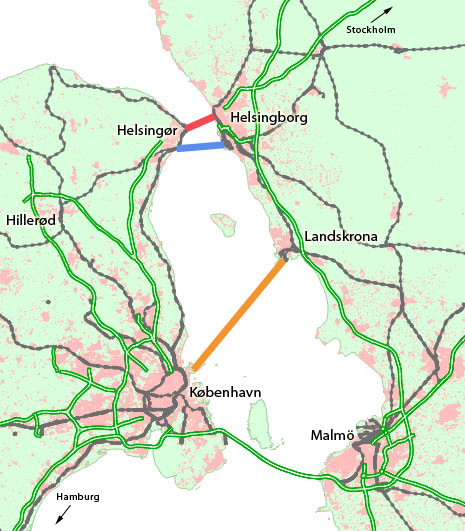
Proposals for a second Øresund link (red, blue, and orange lines).

The HH Tunnel is a proposed series of tunnels under Øresund between Helsingborg in Sweden and Helsingør in Denmark and one tunnel between Landskrona, Sweden and Copenhagen, Denmark. The connection is planned for passenger trains, and other proposals for the tunnels include freight rail and road tunnels.

There is still no decision on the construction of the HH-route. Neither the Danish nor Swedish governments have committed to scheduling or financing. Local and regional authorities are involved in the project.

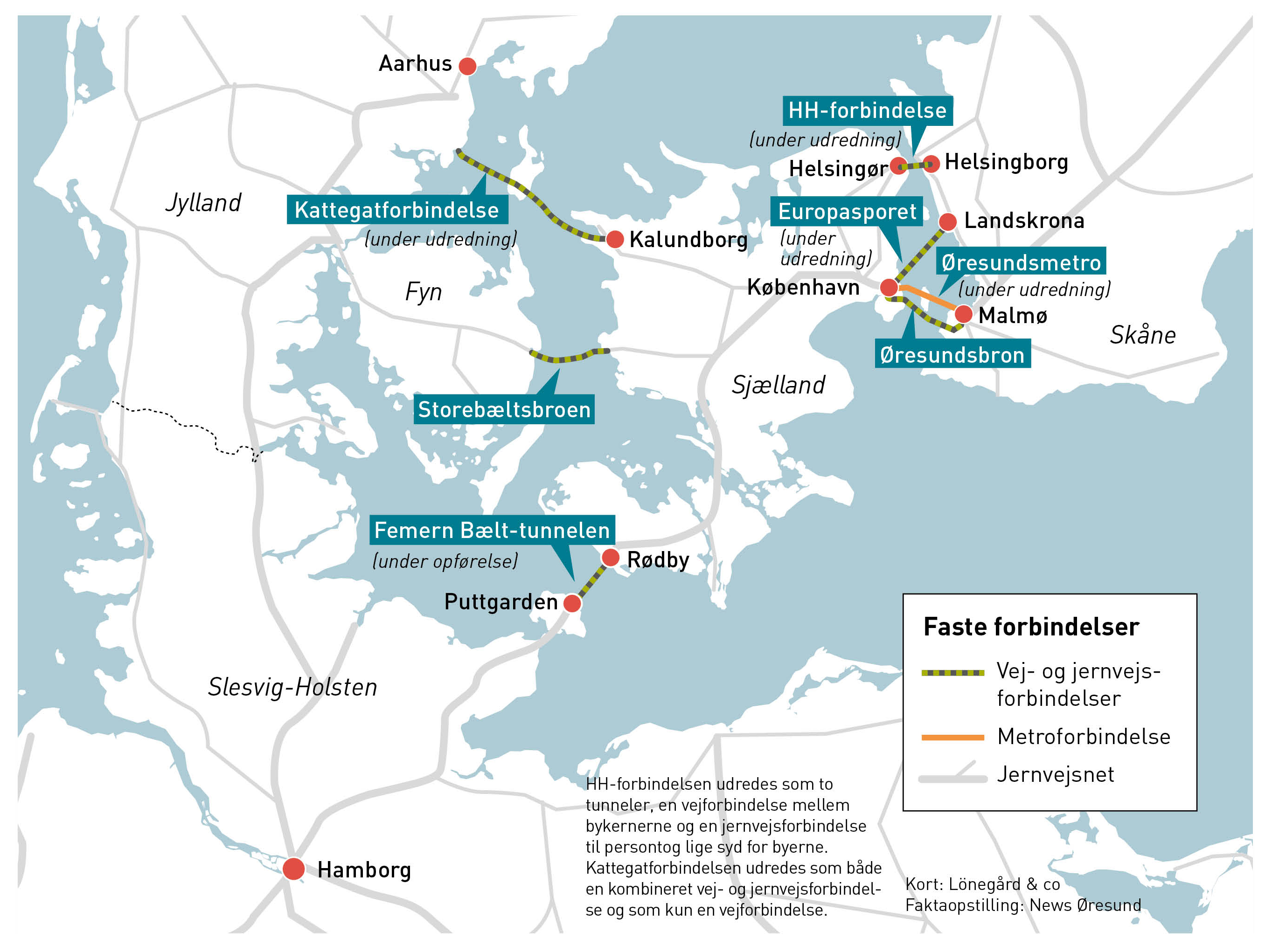

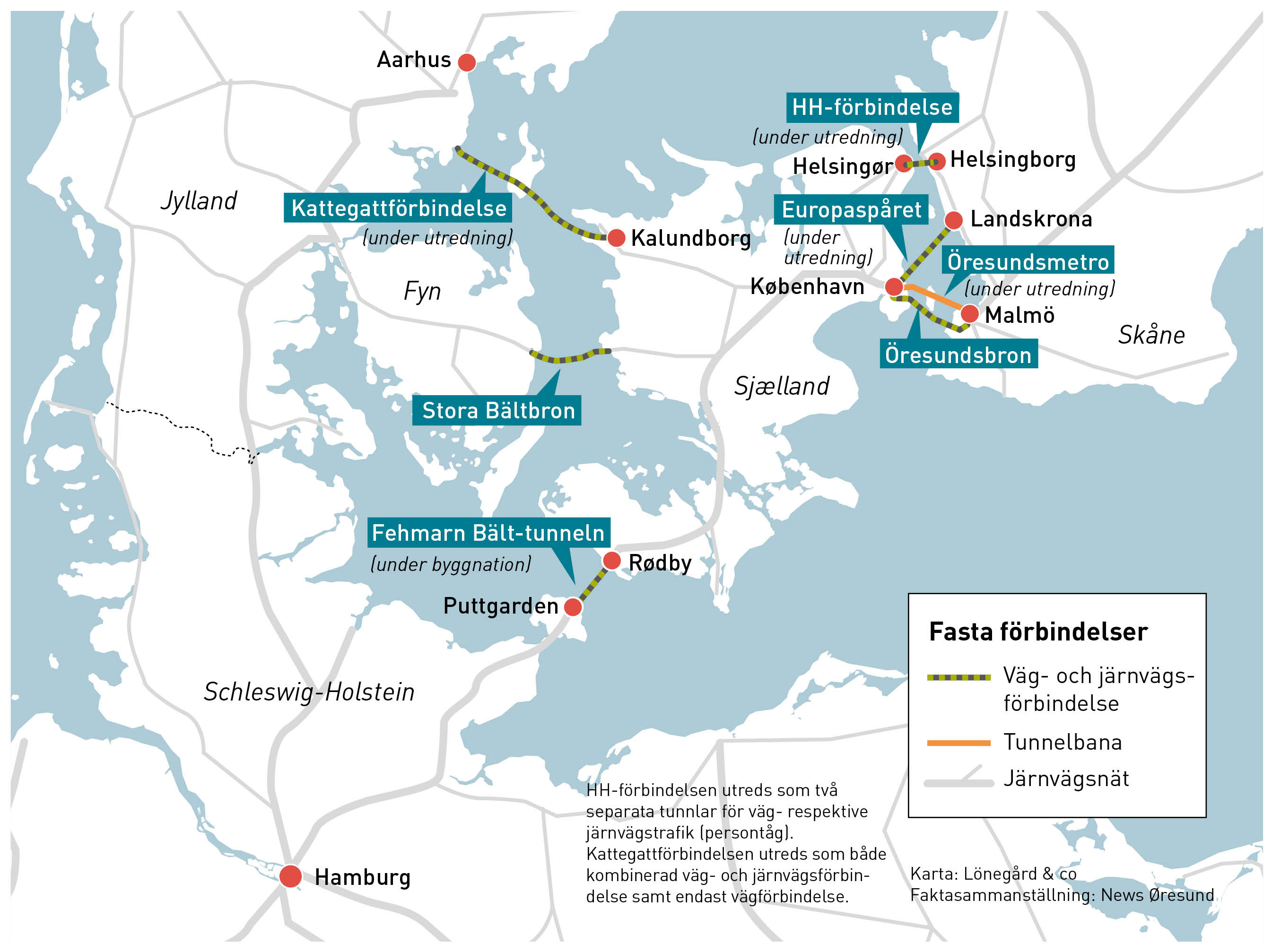

The largest proposals for connecting the two countries' railways include two new high-speed railways: Jönköping–Helsingborg (Europabanan, 250 km) and Helsingør–Copenhagen (50 km). A tunnel for freight trains would also need gentle inclines, making the tunnel 15 km long with railway stations deep underground, or to have separate tunnels for freight and passenger trains. If a freight railway tunnel is built then the connecting railway, Hässleholm–Helsingborg (75 km), would need to be upgraded to double track and a new freight railway, Helsingør–Roskilde (60 km), would need to be built.

Various Danish governments over the years have rejected the idea, especially freight trains and more road traffic through North Zealand such as the proposed Ring 5 motorway. As such, the project has never been given any high priority in Denmark. After Sweden had a change of government in the 2014 elections, the new Löfven government stated the HH Tunnel project was "one of several" they had in mind.

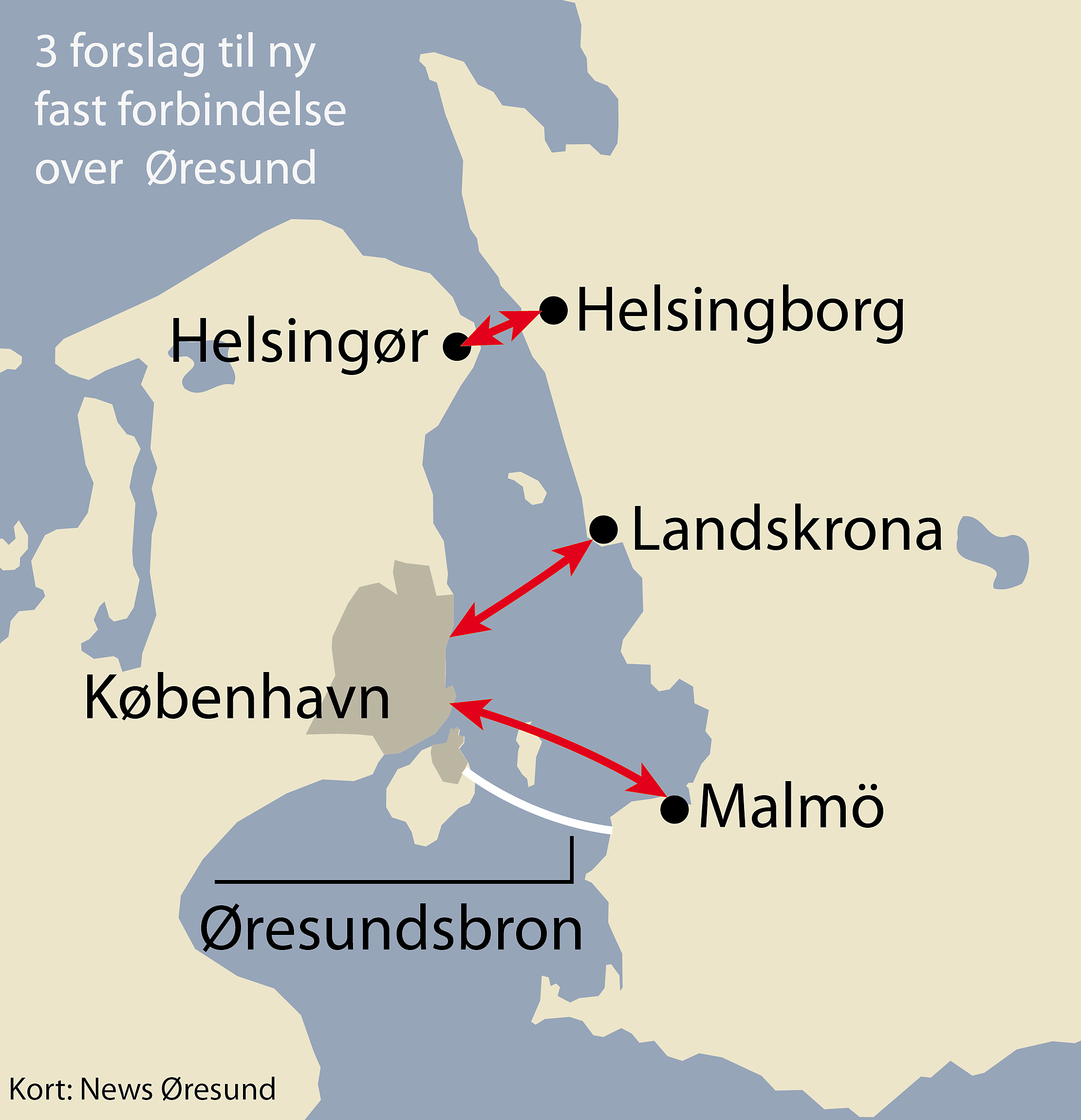

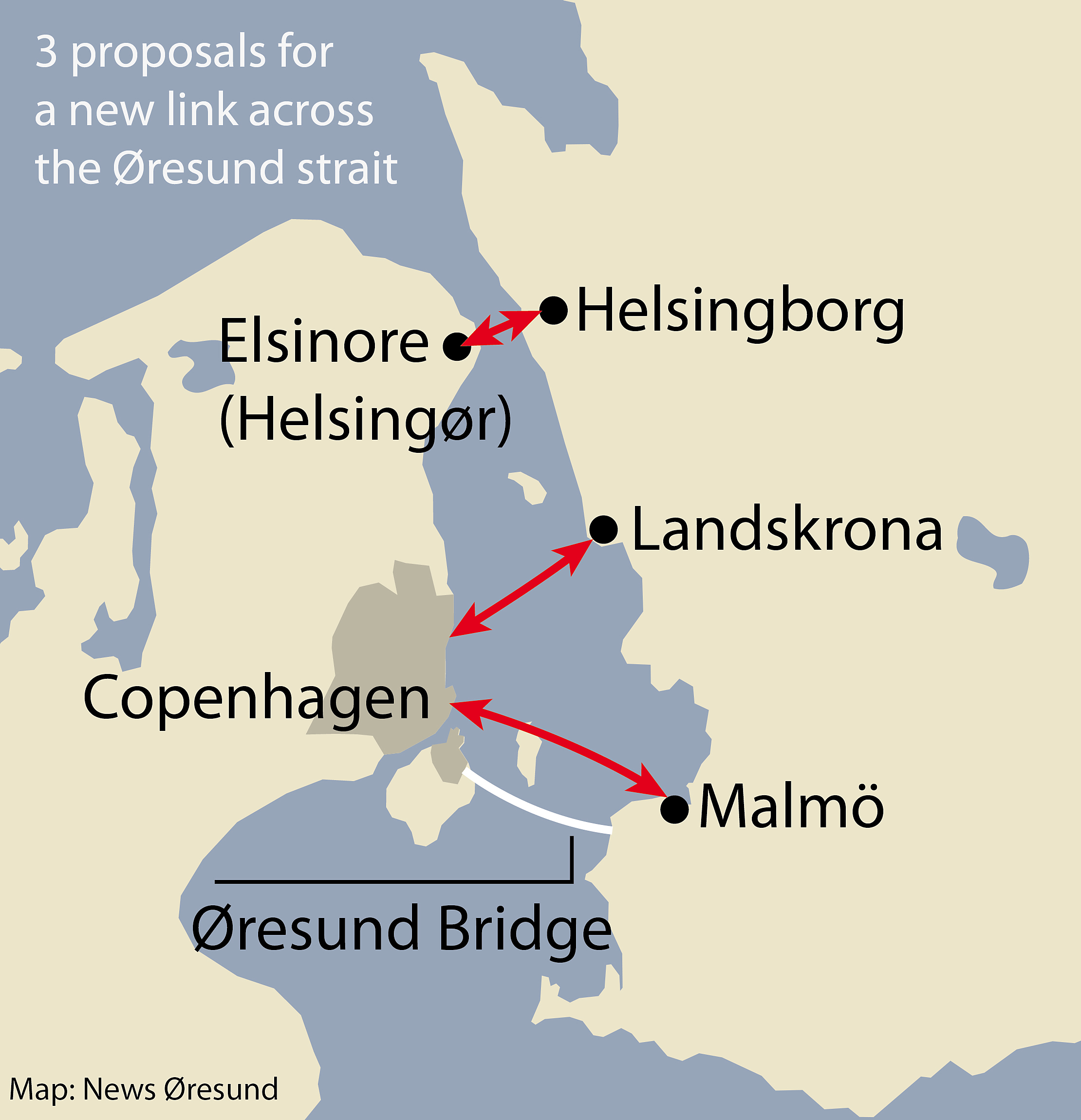

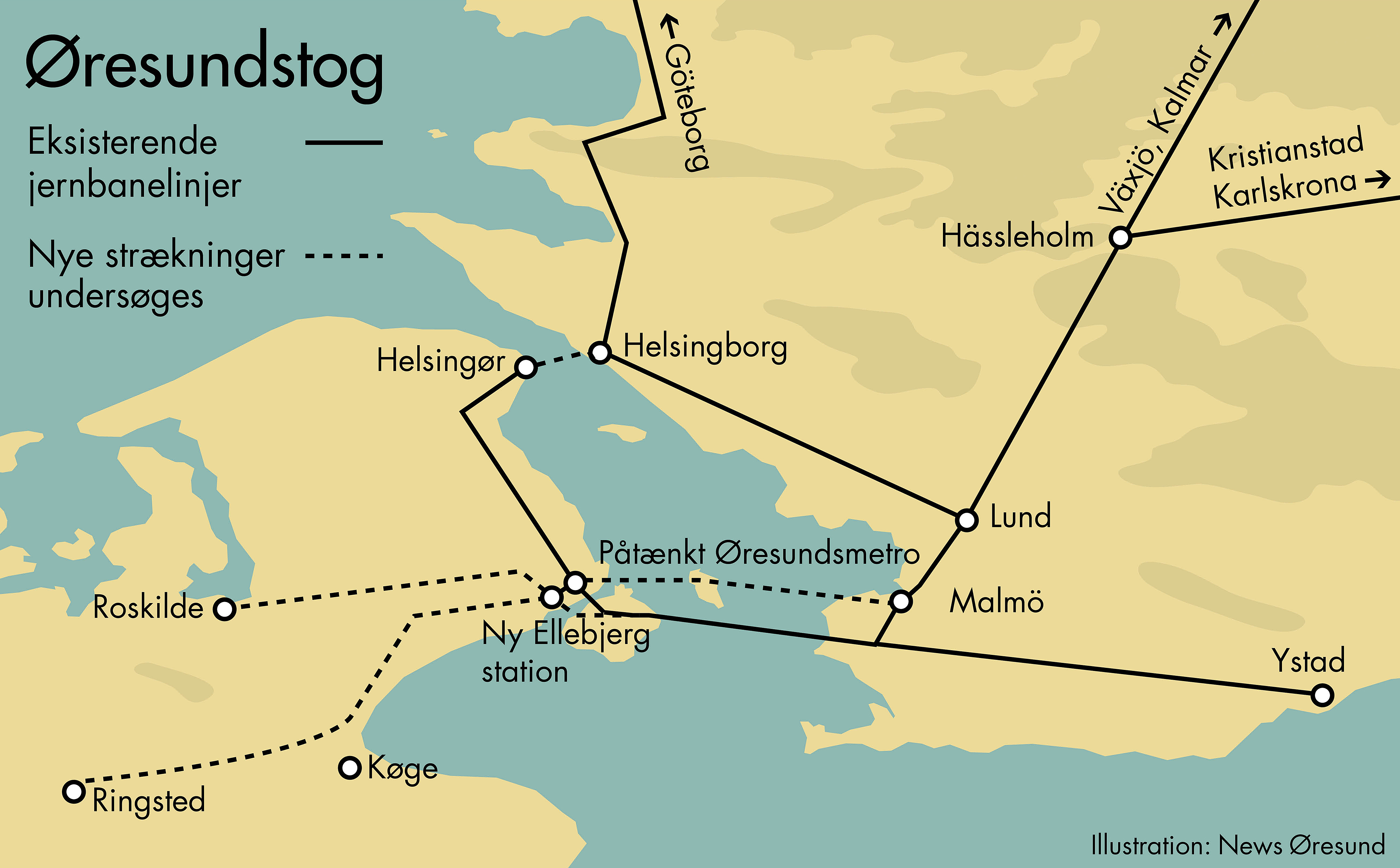

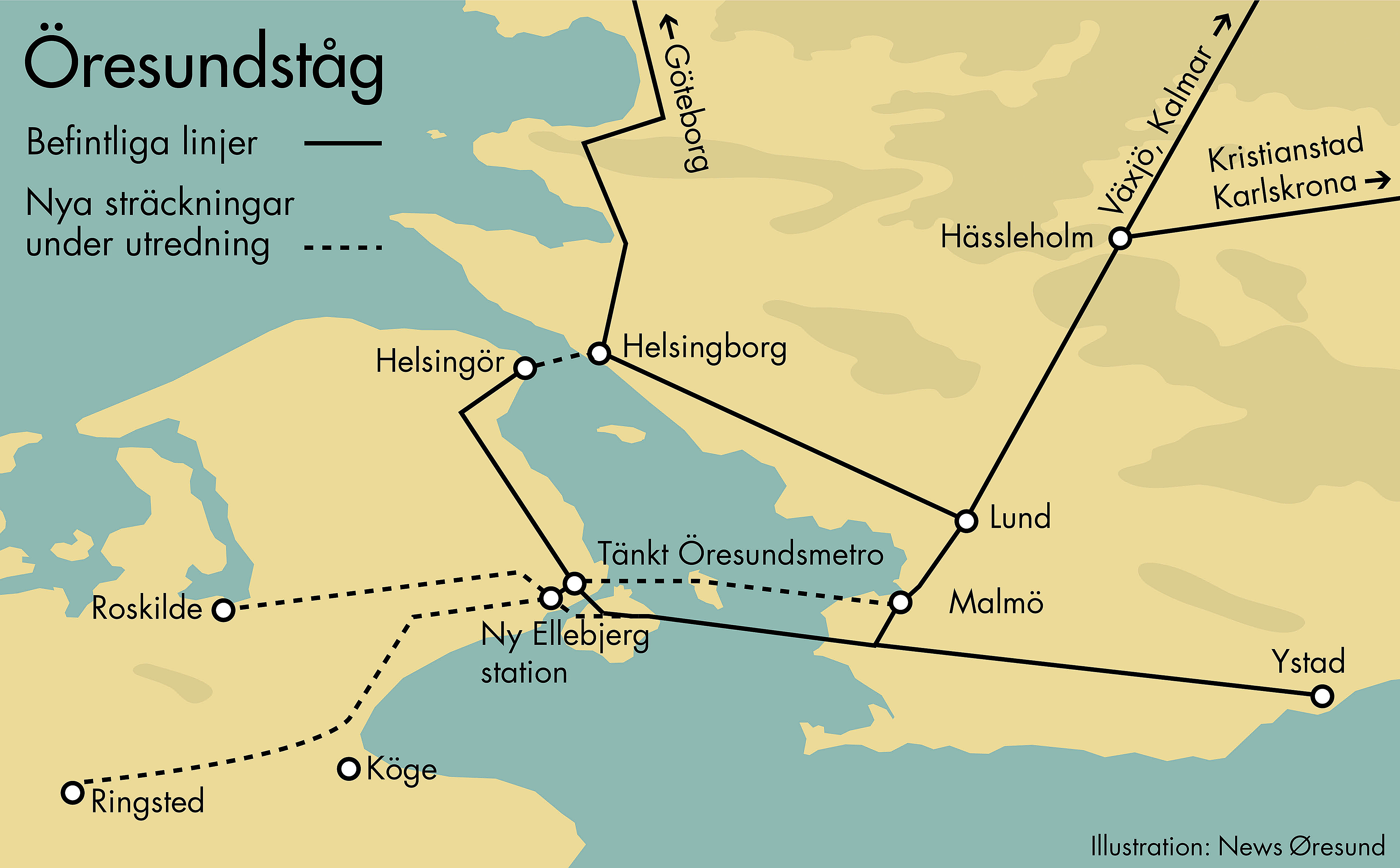

== Official pre-study 2018-2020 ==
A pre-study was previously made by the city of Helsingborg. In 2018 a new pre-study was started by the two national authorities. The directives for this pre-study do not contain any freight train adaptation for the tunnel.

This pre-study was presented in January 2021. It proposed separate road and rail tunnels, or only a road tunnel. A pure road tunnel (assumed cost 21 bn SEK) can be financed by road tolls only, if the budget does not increase much. However both a road and rail tunnel (assumed cost 57 bn SEK) would not be financed enough by the users and would not give enough benefit to the society to pay its construction cost.

The 11 km long road tunnel is planned to be located between south suburbs of both cities. The rail tunnel would go under both city centres with new underground stations, and connected to the rail network in the outskirts of both cities. Since the proposal does not contain any new railway between Copenhagen and Helsingør, it would most be used by local trains taking around the same 45 minutes as today (2022) Copenhagen–Helsingør, and around 50 minutes Copenhagen–Helsingborg which can be compared with the 79 minutes taken (2022) over the Øresund Bridge.

== Landskrona-Copenhagen alternative (Europaspåret) ==
Despite the emphasis on the "HH" route, it has been suggested that a link between Landskrona (in Sweden) and Nordhavn, in north Copenhagen, using a combination of a low level bridge and a short tunnel, below a central shipping lane in Øresund, would be easier to build, mainly because no new road and railway would be needed Copenhagen-Helsingør. The distance is 20 km. Such a route would also cut up to 15 minutes from a journeys between Copenhagen on one hand and Helsingborg, south-west Sweden and Norway on the other – compared to a passenger tunnel between Helsingborg and Helsingør. From Nordhavn a road connection would be needed to leave the city. Since there is no room prepared on the ground for a direct road connection, either a 10 km long tunnel is needed, or using the existing motorway on a long detour past Kongens Lyngby which probably does not have the needed capacity.

A ring track connecting Landskrona (Sweden) => Nordhavn Ydre (Denmark) - Østerport - Nørreport - Copenhagen H - Ørestad - Tårnby - Copenhagen Airport => Hyllie (Sweden) - Triangeln - Malmö C - Lund - Landskrona, with Inter Regional trains clockwise and anti-clockwise three or four times per hour, also shortens the time between Lund, Landskrona and the four adjoining stations (in Copenhagen).
