= Danish national road 11 =

Road in Denmark

Primary Route 11
- Primærrute 11
- Primærrute 11 highlighted red

Route information
- Length: 349 km (217 mi)

Major junctions
- From: Sæd
- To: Aalborg

Location
- Country: Denmark

Highway system
- Transport in Denmark; Motorways

Danish national road 11 (Danish: Primærrute 11) is part of the Danish national road network. It runs along Jutland's west coast from Sæd at the German border to Aalborg in the north of Jutland.

Its year-round traffic ranged between 3,100 and 16,400 in 2008.
