= Vejdirektoratet =

Vejdirektoratet (Danish Road Directorate)

Directorate overview
- Formed: 1949
- Jurisdiction: Kingdom of Denmark
- Headquarters: Copenhagen
- Directorate executive: Jens Holmboe, Director-General
- Parent Directorate: Danish Ministry of Transport
- Website: http://www.vejdirektoratet.dk/

Vejdirektoratet or the Danish Road Directorate is responsible for the national road network of Denmark, which comprises motorways, a number of main roads and many of the country's bridges – a total of about 4,000 kilometres.

== Tasks ==
Road Directorate's work consists primarily of three elements:

- Planning
- Construction and operation
- Traffic and management

== Organisation ==
The structure of the Directorate includes;

- General Directorate (including procurement and supplier management, human resources, and communication)
- Planning (including safety and environment)
- Construction
- Traffic operations
- Resources (including finance and IT)

The Danish Road Directorate is based at six service centres across the country and forms part of the Danish Ministry of Transport, Building and Housing.
