= Søndervig =

Coastal town in west Jutland, Denmark

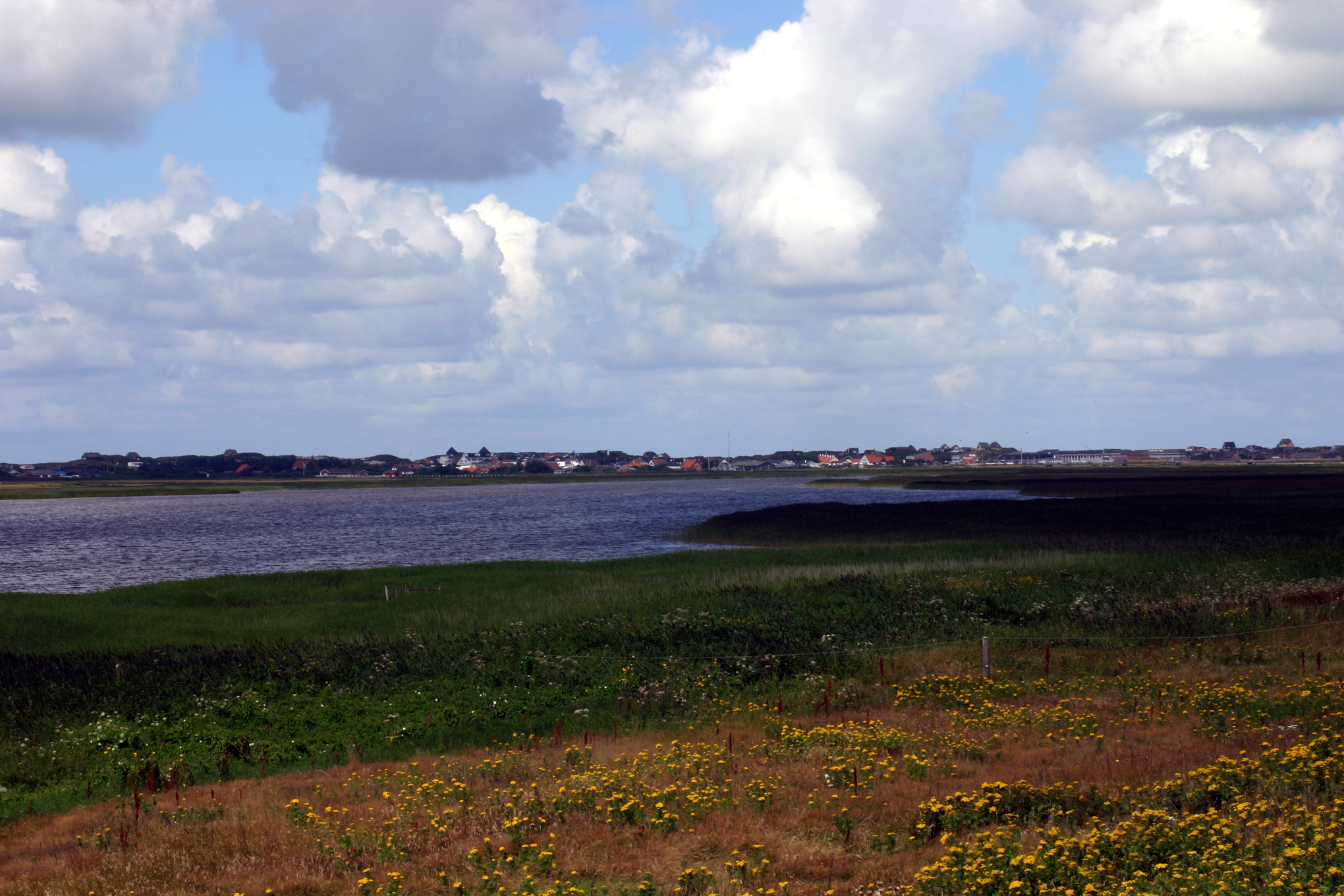
- Søndervig seen from Ringkøbing Fjord
- Interactive map of Søndervig
- Coordinates: 56.1192°N 8.1164°E
- Country: Denmark
- Region: Central Denmark Region
- Municipality: Ringkøbing-Skjern Municipality

Søndervig is a beach town and tourist destination on the west coast of Jutland, in the Ringkøbing-Skjern Municipality in Denmark.

Søndervig is the surfacing point for early undersea telecommunications cables from Newbiggin in Northumberland, England that were originally laid by the Great Northern Telegraph Company of Copenhagen.
