= Kirke Sonnerup =

- Village
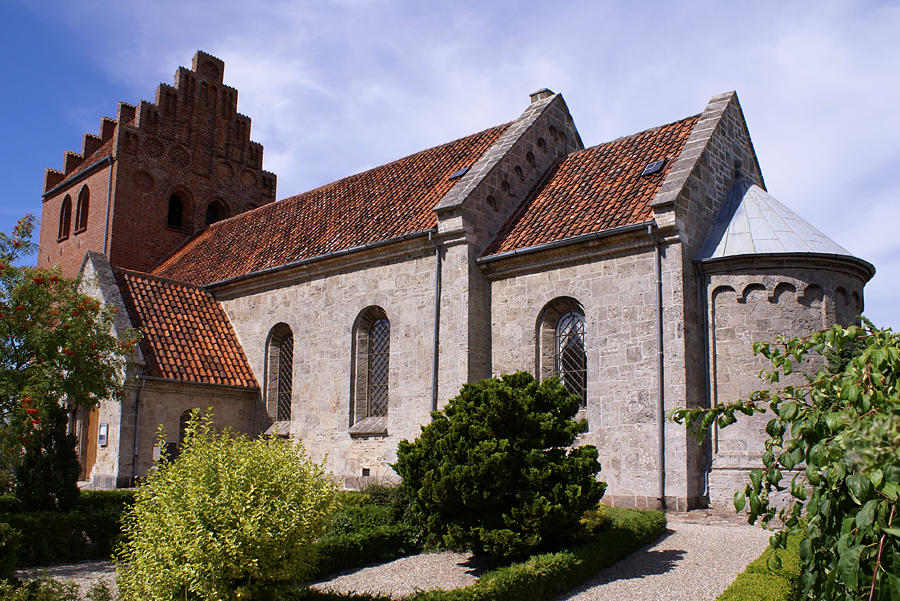
- Sonnerup Church in Kirke Sonnerup

- Location in Region Zealand Kirke Sonnerup (Denmark)
- Coordinates: 55°38′56″N 11°49′7″E
- Country: Denmark
- Region: Region Zealand
- Municipality: Lejre Municipality

Population (2026)
  - Total: 961

Kirke Sonnerup is a village, with a population of 961 (1 January 2026), in Lejre Municipality, Region Zealand in Denmark.

Sonnerup Church is located to the northeast in the old part of the village.
