= Öresund Metro =

Proposed metro link between Copenhagen and Malmö

Øresundsmetro Öresundsmetro

Overview
- Area served: Copenhagen, Denmark; Malmö, Sweden
- Transit type: Rapid transit
- Number of lines: 1
- Website: https://oresundsmetro.com/en

Operation
- Operation will start: Construction (estimate): Starting 2028–2030; Opening (estimate): No earlier than 2035

Technical
- System length: 22.1 km (13.7 mi)
- Track gauge: 1,435 mm (4 ft 8 1/2 in) standard gauge
- Top speed: 120 km/h (75 mph)

The Öresund Metro (Danish: Øresundsmetroen; Swedish: Öresundsmetron) is a proposed metro tunnel link between the cities of Copenhagen, Denmark, and Malmö, Sweden. It would complement the existing Øresund heavy rail line, offering a rapid transit option across the Øresund Strait, improving cross-border mobility between the two countries.

The Öresund Metro is expected to shorten travel times between Malmö and Copenhagen, strengthen labour-market integration across the Öresund region and relieve capacity pressure on the Öresund Bridge by freeing capacity for freight and long-distance trains. The City of Malmö and the City of Copenhagen have collaborated on the project for almost 15 years.

== Background and history ==
=== EU Study (2011) ===
In September 2011, the local governments of Copenhagen and Malmö announced their intention to seek European Union funding to study the potential for a metro line under the Øresund, connecting to the Malmö Central Station. This would provide faster travel and additional capacity beyond the existing Øresund Bridge. The EU granted funding for the study in December 2011, which aimed to explore both a simple shuttle between the two stations and a continuous metro line integrated with the local transport networks on each side. The anticipated travel time between the two city centers was projected to be approximately 20 minutes. The study was completed in April 2021.

=== Formation of Øresund Metro Executive (2018) ===
In May 2018, the Øresund Metro Executive was formed, consisting of representatives from the cities of Copenhagen and Malmö, industry professionals, and researchers. Their goal was to explore the feasibility of a driverless metro system connecting Copenhagen and Malmö with a reduced travel time of around 20 minutes, compared to 35 minutes by train. Expected capacity constraints on the Øresund Line due to the Fehmarn Belt fixed link have made the €4 billion metro proposal an important solution to alleviate congestion.

In addition to the core project, Malmö has made plans for the first three metro stations, which, if the line is ever built, would be located in the Västra hamnen district of Malmö. The first station, located at Fullriggaren (currently a bus stop), would be called Galeonen, with two additional stations at Masttorget and Malmö Central. The metro stations are intended to play a key role in the development of new areas around these stops, particularly the Galeonen project, which envisions creating a new coastal district from the earth excavated during the tunnel construction. This would create an area designed to combat rising sea levels and promote biodiversity.

=== Inclusion in Copenhagen Metro Plans (2025) ===
On 23 September 2025, Copenhagen’s Finance Committee (Økonomiudvalget) included the Öresund Metro in a report on the city’s future metro network expansion. The report proposes eight potential new metro routes, including a line connecting Malmö and Copenhagen. Produced by Metroselskabet, it assessed projected passenger volumes, climate impact, accessibility to workplaces and homes, and the required residual financing.

Ticket revenues for the Öresund Metro are estimated to cover roughly two-thirds of the project’s costs, with the remaining funding shared between Sweden and Denmark. This makes the proposal comparatively less reliant on additional public financing than several other options.

No political decision to prioritise any of the proposed routes was made at the committee meeting; further political approval will be required before the project can proceed to the next stages.

== Proposal and specifications ==
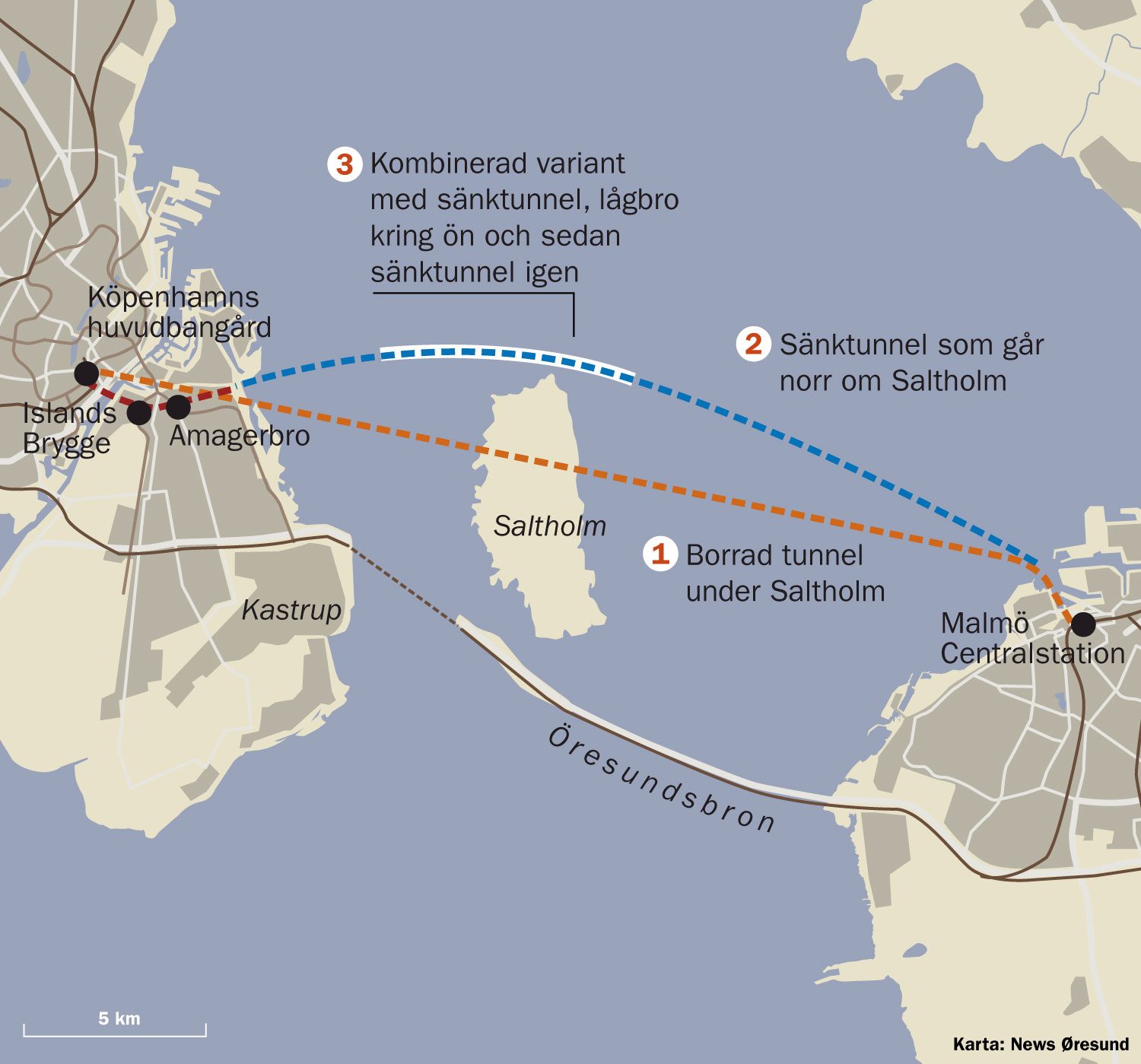
Routes across the Öresund under consideration in 2013

The Öresund Metro is planned to feature the following specifications:

- Capacity: 36 trains per hour in each direction (departures every 90 seconds – 2.3 million people capacity)
- Travel time: Around 20/25 minutes
- Maximum speed: 120 km/h (75 mph)
- Integration: The metro line would connect directly with the existing Copenhagen Metro system

In earlier sources, the Öresund Metro was projected to branch off the M5 line at Lergravsparken. However, since the necessary infrastructure ("afgreningskammer") wasn't included in the M5 project, as of 2025 this is no longer possible. Instead, the selected branch point is to be the planned Prags Boulevard station.

- Planned stations in Malmö:
  - Västra hamnen norr / Galeonen+ (located at Fullriggaren)
  - Västra hamnen syd / Masttorget
  - Malmö Central Station

There are no current decisions to start construction. Earlier sources claimed the construction of the metro could begin around 2030, although some sources have suggested a potential start date as early as 2028. If completed, the metro would significantly improve cross-border mobility and alleviate congestion on existing rail services, including the Øresundståg.

== Expected benefits and timeline ==
The project, valued at approximately DKK 30 billion (EUR 4 billion), is expected to reduce travel time between Copenhagen and Malmö from 40 minutes to about 25 minutes. The metro line will travel 22.1 kilometers under the Øresund Strait, with a total of five new stations along the route. It will accommodate 36 trains per hour, traveling at speeds of up to 120 km/h. Completion of the metro line is expected around 2035, though construction may begin as early as 2028.

The Öresund Metro will increase labour market cohesion, allowing 2.3 million people to commute across the Öresund within an hour (up from 1.3 million), with job availability increasing by approximately 500,000. It will also reduce congestion on existing rail lines, creating more space for freight transport between Scandinavia and Central Europe.

Additionally, the Öresund Metro contributes to EU climate goals by shifting freight transport from road to rail, reducing emissions and enhancing greener transport in the region. It will also provide an alternative route to Copenhagen Airport, improving public transport redundancy and increasing punctuality.

== See also ==
- Øresundståg – passenger train network operating in the transnational Øresund Region of Denmark and Sweden
- HH Tunnel – a proposed tunnel under the Øresund between Helsingborg, Sweden and Helsingør, Denmark (opposed by Danish politicians and political actors; not prioritised in Denmark but not formally rejected by the national government)
- Landskrona–Copenhagen tunnel (Europaspåret) – a proposed tunnel under the Øresund between Landskrona, Sweden, and Nordhavn (north Copenhagen), Denmark, using a combination of a low-level bridge and a short tunnel (advocated locally in Sweden, conceptually studied, but no traction at the national level in Sweden or Denmark)
- Johor Bahru–Singapore Rapid Transit System – a similar cross-border metro line currently under construction between Woodlands, Singapore and Johor Bahru, Malaysia
