= Pepper Island =

Pepper Island may refer to:

- Langkawi, Malaysia, once known to British mariners as Pepper Island
- Cockspur Island, Georgia, United States, originally known as Pepper Island

== See also ==
- Peberholm (literal translation: Pepper Island), an artificial island in Denmark
