= Broloppet =

Running event

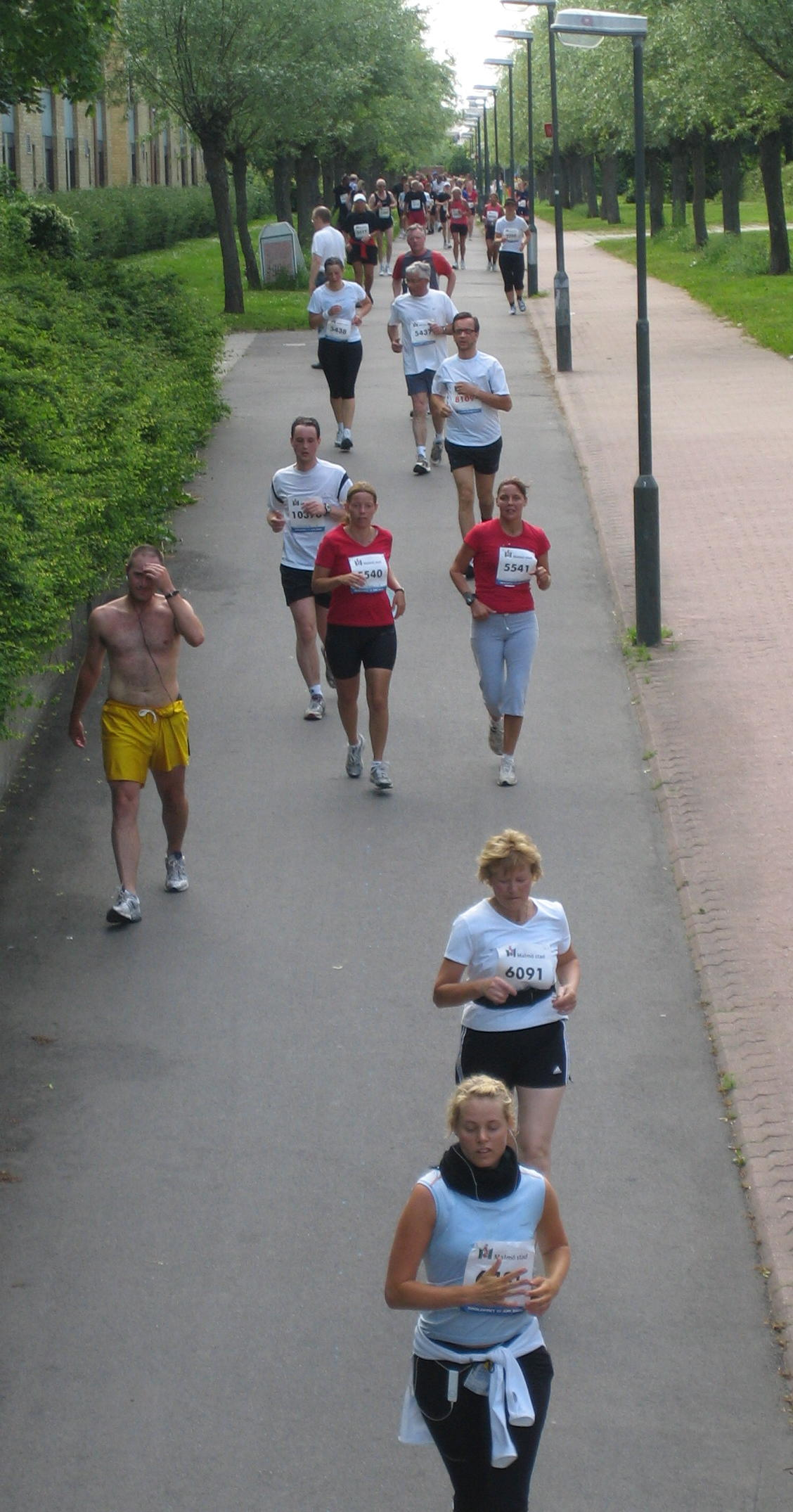
- Date: 2000, 2002 - 2006, 2010, 2025
- Location: Amager, Denmark to Malmö, Sweden
- Event type: Road
- Distance: Half marathon (13.109375 miles (21.097 km))
- Established: 12 June 2000

Broloppet (Danish: Broløbet; the Bridge Run) is a running event that takes place on the Øresund Bridge. Organised by MAI and Sparta Atletik. The competition was originally meant to be a one-time event to celebrate the opening of the Öresund Bridge, taking place on 12 June 2000.

On 12 June 2010 the race was revived as part of the 10th anniversary of the Øresund Bridge. The race distance was the same as the original. The race was then revived again in 2025 to commemorate the bridge's 25th anniversary.

== Races ==
=== Bridge Run 2000 ===
With over 90,000 entrants and 79,719 finishers it remains one of the largest running events ever held, and the world's largest half marathon ahead of Göteborgsvarvet (59,000) and the Great North Run (54,000).

The first race, which was won by Ethiopian runner Tesfaye Tola only three months before he won the bronze medal at the 2000 Summer Olympics, started at the Danish end of the bridge on the island of Amager, continued through the tunnel under the artificial island of Peberholm, over the Öresund Bridge to the finish in Limhamn in Malmö.

== Race results ==
=== Men ===
1. Björn Elí Björnsson, Iceland, 59:51
2. Philip Rugut, Kenya, 1:00:00
3. Phaustin Baha Sulle, Tanzania, 1:00:05
4. Róbert Štefko, Slovakia, 1:00:29
5. Gezahegne Abera, Ethiopia, 1:00:30

=== Women ===
1. Restituta Joseph, Tanzania, 1:07:59
2. Joyce Chepchumba, Kenya, 1:08:18
3. Lyubov Morgunova, Russia, 1:08:45
4. Abeba Tola, Ethiopia, 1:08:48
5. Maria Guida, Italy, 1:09:00

=== Bridge Run 2010 ===
The 10th anniversary event was held on 12 June 2010, with the route covering a half marathon distance from Denmark to Sweden, as in the original race. There were 30,000 participants in the race. Race photos can be found online.

=== Bridge Run 2025 ===
The 2025 edition of The Bridge Run was held on June 15 and had 40,000 participants running from Tårnby in Denmark to Sibbarp in Sweden. When it became possible to book a spot in the race, the online waiting list was overloaded and tickets were sold out in under 1 hour. The 2025 event came with the addition of a mobile application that allowed runners and spectators to track race times and find information about the event. It also provided runners with a commemorative bag and option to purchase an official t-shirt. The main sponsor of the event was Boozt.
