= Lernacken =

Mostly artificial cape in the Öresund

Coordinates: 55.566389°N 12.898889°E

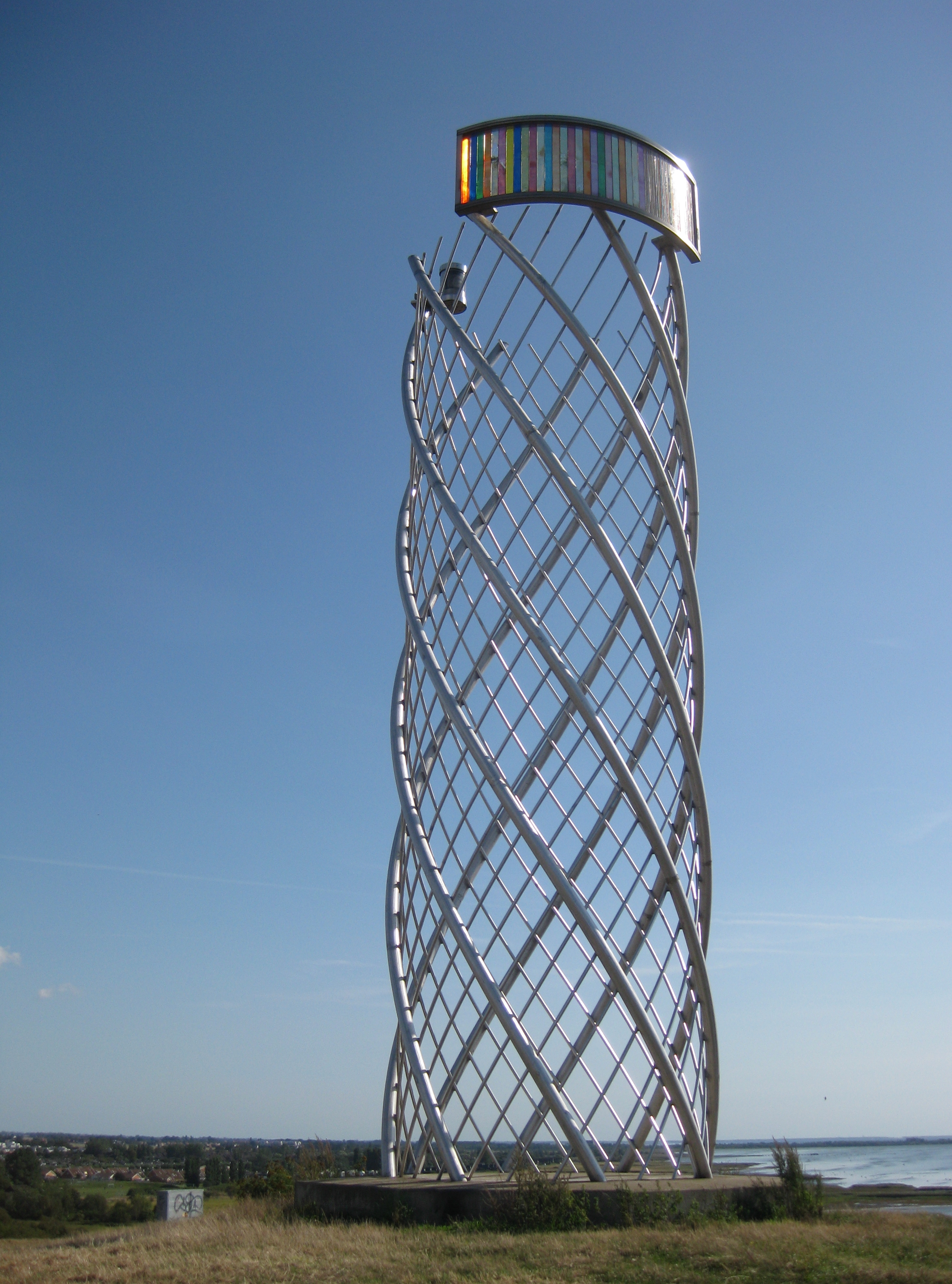
Monument The movement meter for Lernacken – The Tower (Ólafur Elíasson, 2000)

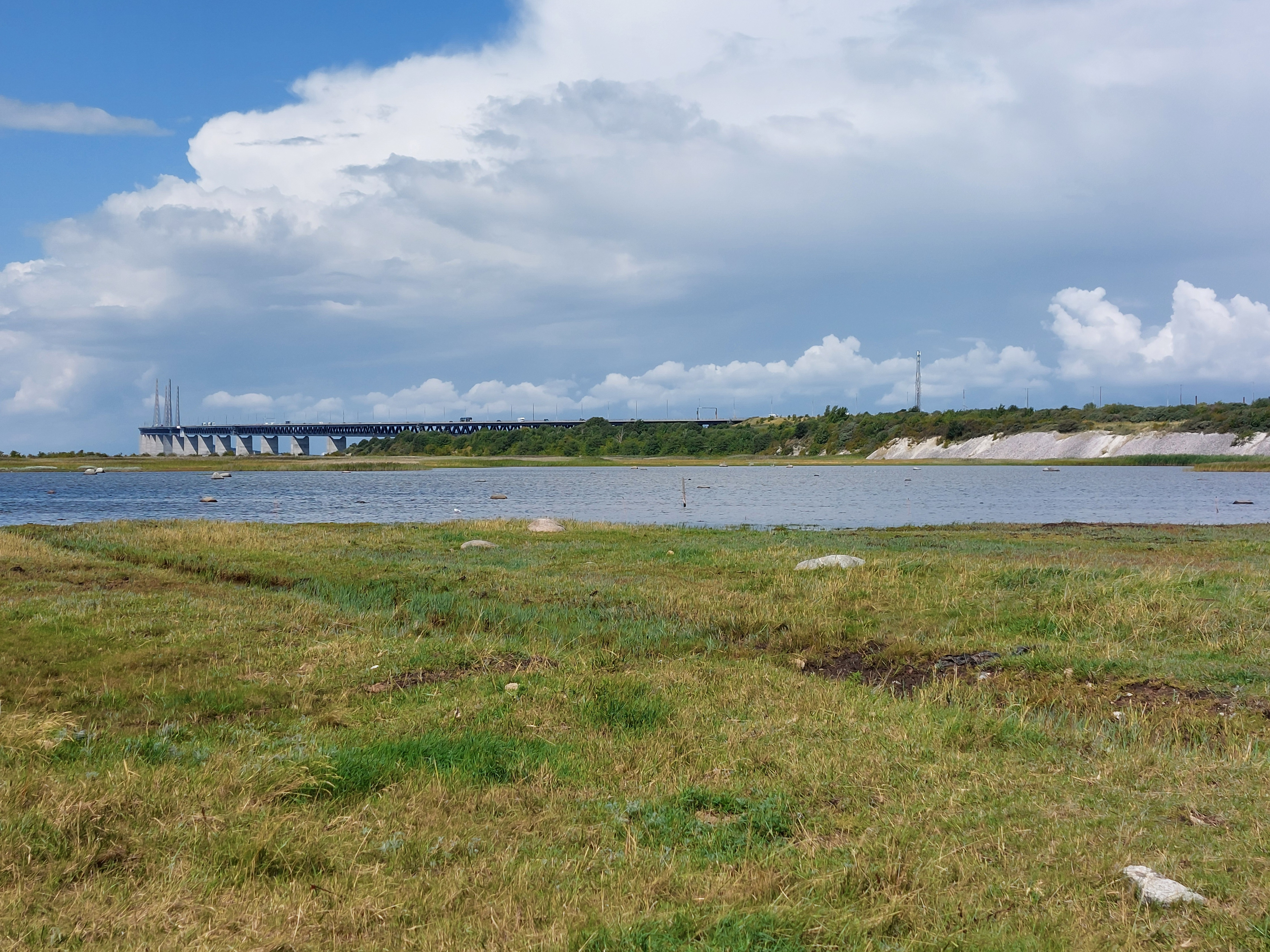
View on Lernacken from Bunkeflostrand. Öresund Bridge on the left, Overburden of the Limhamn quarry on the right

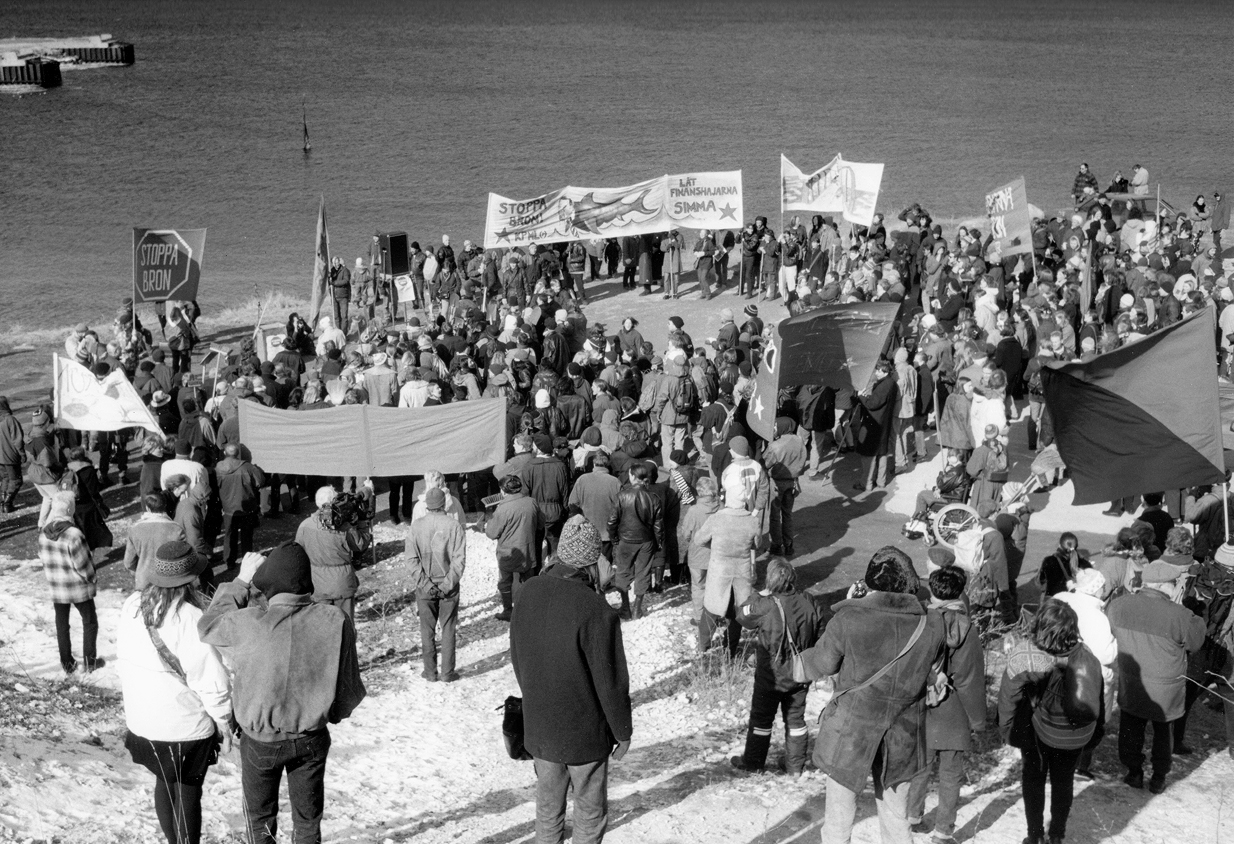
Demonstration of the Environmental movement Stoppa bron (Stop the bridge) on Lernacken, 1993

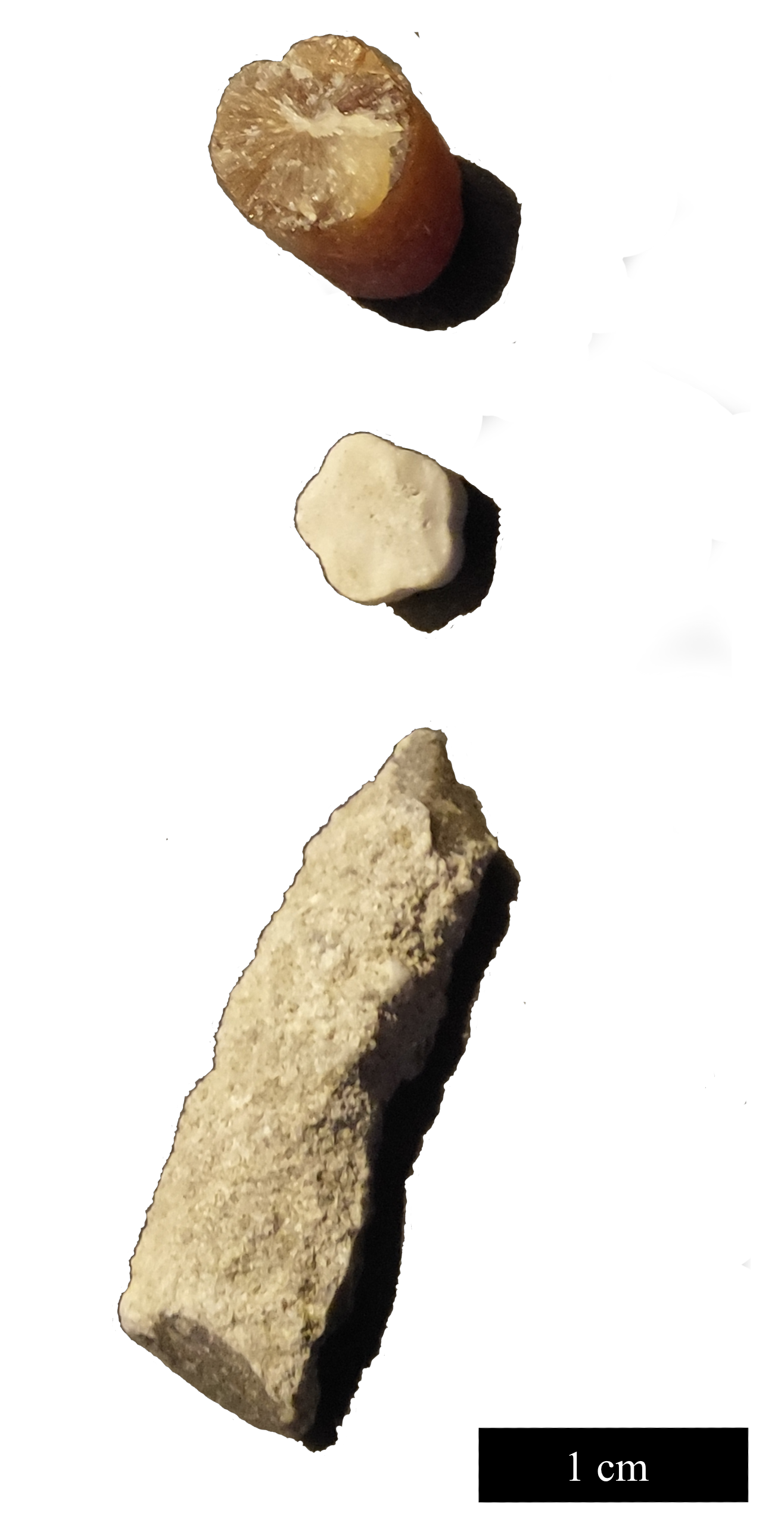
Typical fossil content Lernacken lagerstätte (Malmö). From top to bottom: Belemnite, Columnal part of an Crinoid and a concretion of flint.

Lernacken is a mostly artificial cape in the Öresund, the sound between Denmark and Sweden. Lernacken is located in the southwest of Malmö (Skåne) between the suburbs Bunkeflostrand and Limhamn. The area lacks mostly of vegetation, the sparse vegetation consists mostly from shrubs and small trees.

Since the early 20th century overburden materials from the nearby limestone quarry Limhamn were deposited. The material consists mostly from siltstone and flint, which contains fossils. Typical fossils are belemnites, crinoids and several kinds of flint nodules. According to the SGU (Geological Survey of Sweden) is the age of the paleozoic rocks 65.5–61.1 Ma.

The overburden was transported with two narrow-gauge railways, which were built for this purpose. Later in the 20th century were also industrial wastes deposited.

Very important for the international traffic is the toll-station on Lernacken, where fees for the use of the Öresund Bridge must be paid, whether the traffic comes from Denmark or Sweden.

Because of the construction of the bridge environmental movements demonstrated on Lernacken, the "Stoppa bron" (Stop the bridge) movement was well known.

In 1952, a lighthouse was built on Lernacken; this operated until the inauguration of the Öresund Bridge in 2000. Today, prominent on Lernacken is the sculpture Movement meter for Lernacken which was built in 2000.

The area of Lernacken suffered from a severe anthropogenic modification, nevertheless it's now part of the Bunkeflo Strandängar nature reserve. Within this area are living around 450 species of birds, amphibian and insects. Most prominent bird in this area is the Northern lapwing.
