= Øresund Bridge =

Road and railway bridge connecting Sweden and Denmark

Øresund Bridge (Danish spelling) Öresund Bridge (Swedish spelling)
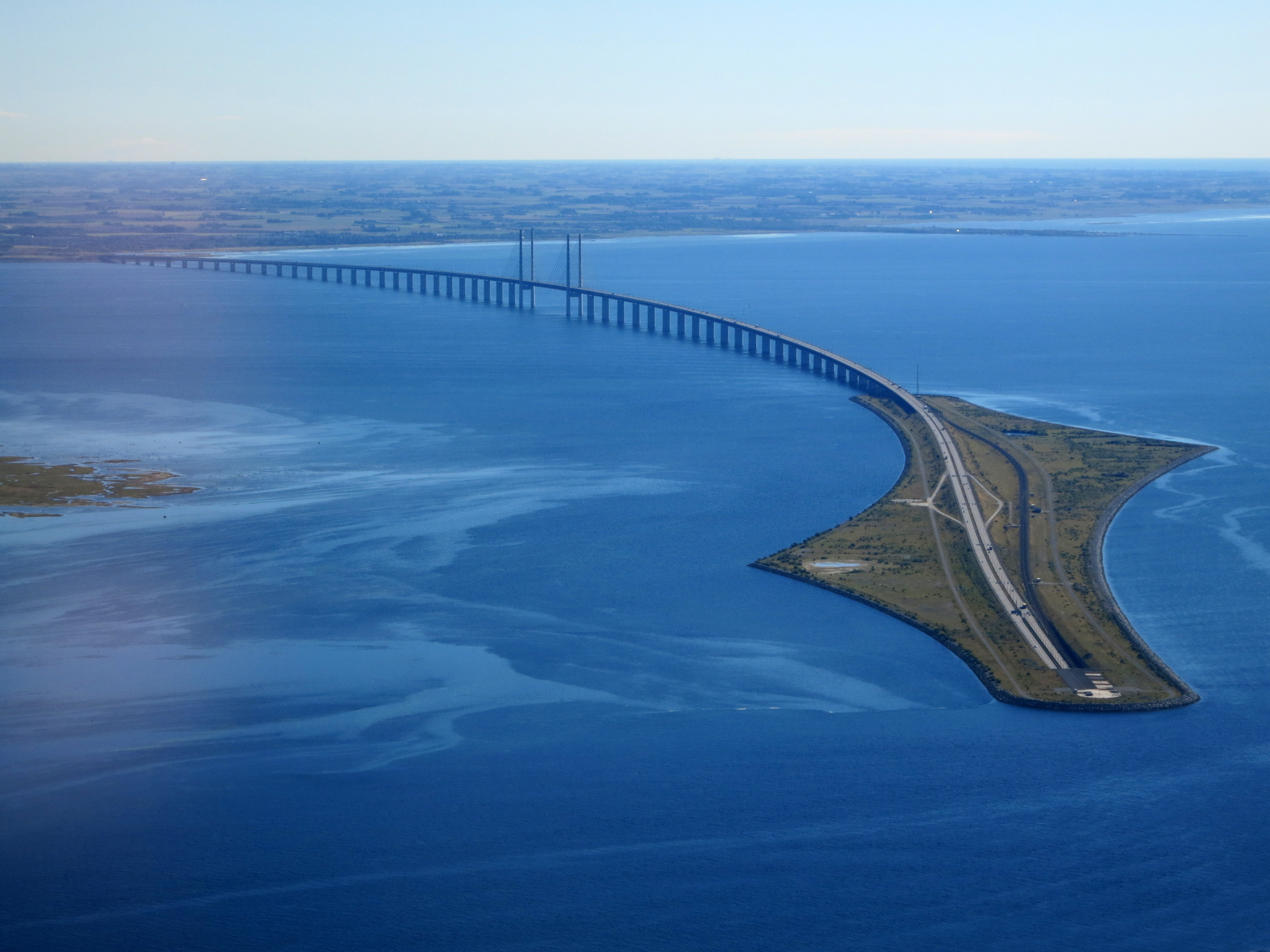
- Aerial view looking from the Danish side, September 2015
- Coordinates: 55°34′14″N 12°50′58″E
- Carries: Four lanes of European route E20; Double-track Øresund Line
- Crosses: Øresund strait (the Sound)
- Locale: Copenhagen, Denmark, and Malmö, Sweden
- Official name: Øresundsbron (used by company); Øresundsbroen (Danish); Öresundsbron (Swedish)
- Website: www.oresundsbron.com/private

Characteristics
- Design: Cable-stayed bridge
- Total length: 7,845 metres (25,738 ft)
- Width: 23.5 metres (77.1 ft)
- Height: 204 metres (669 ft)
- Longest span: 490 metres (1,608 ft)
- Clearance below: 57 metres (187 ft)

History
- Designer: Jørgen Nissen, Klaus Falbe Hansen, Niels Gimsing and Georg Rotne
- Engineering design by: Ove Arup & Partners; Setec; ISC; Gimsing & Madsen
- Constructed by: Hochtief, Skanska, Højgaard & Schultz and Monberg & Thorsen
- Construction start: 1995
- Construction end: 1999
- Construction cost: 19.6 billion DKK; 25.8 billion SEK; 2.6 billion EUR
- Opened: 1 July 2000

Statistics
- Daily traffic: ▲ c. 18,434 road vehicles (2022)
- Toll: DKK 455, SEK 673 or EUR 61 (as of 1 January 2024)

Location
- Interactive map of Øresund Bridge (Danish spelling); Öresund Bridge (Swedish spelling)

Øresund Tunnel
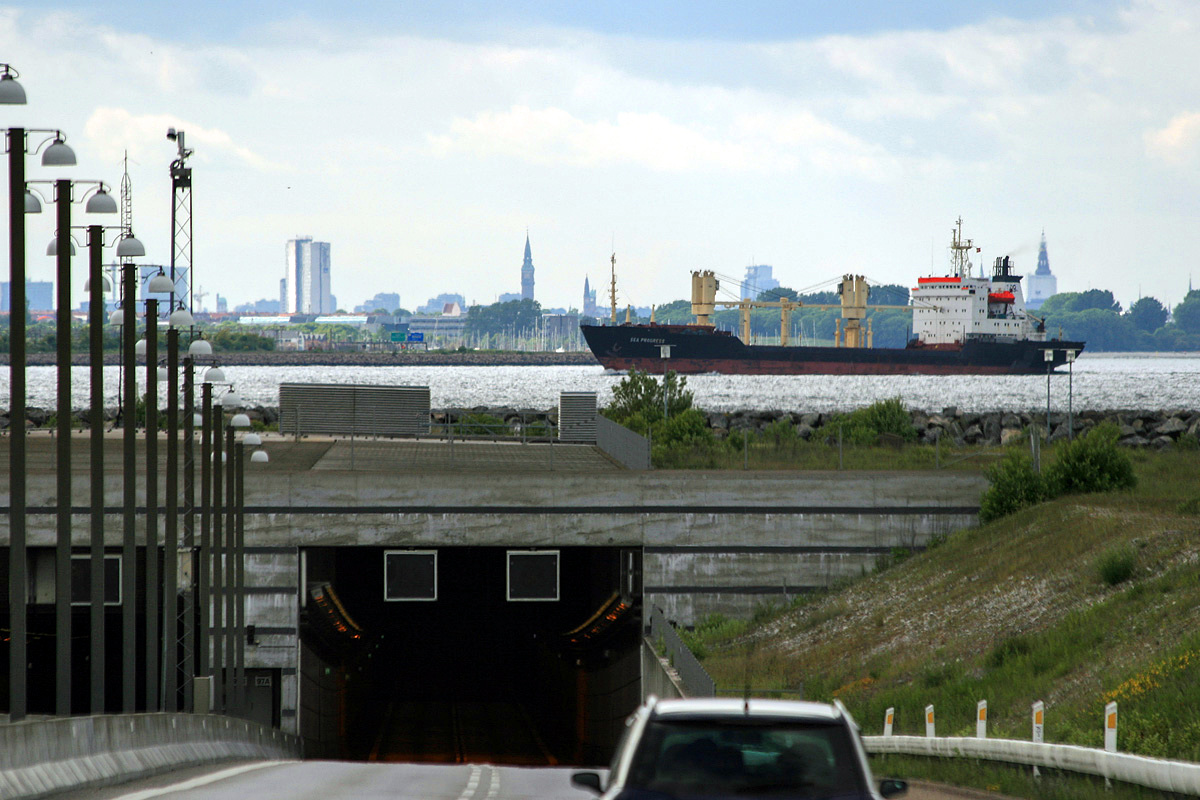
- The Øresund Tunnel passing under the Drogden channel
- Interactive map of Øresund Tunnel

Overview
- Other name: Drogden Tunnel
- Location: Drogden, Øresund
- Coordinates: 55°37′9″N 12°42′28″E
- Status: Active
- Start: Kastrup
- End: Peberholm

Operation
- Opened: 2000
- Traffic: Øresund Line, E20
- Character: Mainline railway, Highway

Technical
- Length: 4,050 m (2.52 mi)
- Track gauge: 1,435 mm (4 ft 8 1/2 in)
- Electrified: 25 kV AC 50 Hz and 15 kV AC 16.7 Hz

The Øresund Bridge or Öresund Bridge (Note: Danish: Øresundsbroen [ˈøːɐsɔnsˌpʁoˀn̩]; Swedish: Öresundsbron [œrɛˈsɵ̂nːdsˌbruːn]; Hybrid name (used by the company): Øresundsbron) is a combined railway and motorway cable-stayed bridge across the Øresund strait between Denmark and Sweden. It is the third longest bridge in Europe and combines both roadway and railway in a single structure, consisting of international European route E20 and the Øresund Line respectively. It runs nearly 8 kilometres (5 miles) from the Swedish coast to the artificial island of Peberholm in the middle of the strait. The Øresund Link is completed by the four-kilometre (2 1/2-mile) Øresund Tunnel from Peberholm to the Danish island of Amager.

Construction began in 1995 and it opened to traffic on 1 July 2000. The bridge, as part of the Øresund Link, directly connects the road and rail networks of the Scandinavian Peninsula with Mainland Europe, via the Great Belt Fixed Link (constructed 1988–1998) connecting Zealand to Funen and thence to the Jutland Peninsula. Both projects helped to lessen the isolation of Sweden and the rest of Scandinavia from the rest of the continent. A data cable also makes the Øresund Link the backbone of Internet data transmission between central Europe and Sweden.

The bridge was designed by Jørgen Nissen and Klaus Falbe Hansen from Ove Arup & Partners, and Niels Gimsing and Georg Rotne. The justification for the additional expenditure and complexity related to digging a tunnel for part of the way, rather than raising that section of the bridge, was to avoid interfering with air traffic from the nearby Copenhagen Airport, to provide a clear channel for ships in good weather or bad, and to prevent ice floes from blocking the strait. The bridge received the 2002 IABSE Outstanding Structure Award.

== History ==
Over the years, there have been several proposals for a fixed link across the strait. One of the most radical was to dam the strait and then pump out the water to create land for development. Ideas for a fixed link across the Øresund were advanced as early as the late 1800s. And in 1910, proposals were put to the Swedish Parliament for a railway tunnel across the strait, which would have comprised two tunnelled sections linked by a surface route across the island of Saltholm. The concept of a bridge over the Øresund was first formally proposed in 1936 by a consortium of engineering firms who proposed a national motorway network for Denmark.

The idea was dropped during World War II, but picked up again thereafter and studied in significant detail in various Danish-Swedish government commissions through the 1950s and 1960s. In 1954, the first Øresund Delegation was appointed to investigate the conditions for a bridge link. In its final report in 1962, the delegation proposed a 53 m (174 ft) tall bridge of reinforced concrete. The cost was estimated at SEK 600 million and was to be financed by a bridge toll of SEK 15.

However, disagreement existed regarding the placement and exact form of the link, with some arguing for a link at the narrowest point of the sound at Helsingør–Helsingborg, north of Copenhagen, and some arguing for a more direct link from Copenhagen to Malmö. Additionally, some regional and local interests argued that other bridge and road projects, notably the then-unbuilt Great Belt Fixed Link, should take priority. The governments of Denmark and Sweden eventually signed an agreement to build a fixed link in 1973. It would have comprised a bridge between Malmö and Saltholm, with a tunnel linking Saltholm to Copenhagen, and would have been accompanied by a second rail tunnel across the Øresund between Helsingør and Helsingborg.

However, that project was cancelled in 1978 due to the economic situation, and growing environmental concerns. As the economic situation improved in the 1980s, interest resumed and the governments signed a new agreement in 1991.

=== Political decisions ===
During the planning of the Øresund Link, a choice was made between the Helsingborg-Helsingør and Malmö-Copenhagen (Limhamn-Amager) routes. However, a great advantage was seen in prioritizing the connection between the major central cities of Copenhagen and Malmö. Another factor against Helsingborg-Helsingør may have been the difficulty of resolving through traffic in the municipalities on the Danish side and the fact that, despite the proximity of the towns, the tunnel had to be long because of the location of the settlements and the depth of the strait, 41 m (135 ft), which also posed geological difficulties. However, a Helsingborg-Helsingør tunnel is still included in the infrastructure planning.

The Danish and Swedish governments agreed on 23 March 1991 to build a combined road and rail link between Kastrup and Limhamn. The link would consist of an immersed tunnel from Kastrup to an artificial island southwest of Saltholm and then on as a bridge to Limhamn. Over the Flintrännan and Trindelrännan fairways, there would be main spans with a vertical clearance of at least 50 m (160 ft) and 32 m (105 ft) respectively. The clear width would be at least 300 m (980 ft) and 200 m (660 ft) respectively. The parties agreed that the final design could be adjusted for environmental, technical and economic reasons. This was indeed the case. The artificial island, Peberholm, ended up just south of Saltholm and instead of two main spans, there was a larger main span over Flintrännan. The route of Flintrännan was shifted one kilometer to the east. The countries created their own companies, A/S Øresundsforbindelsen and Svensk-danska broförbindelsen AB, Svedab AB, and these became half-owners of the joint Øresundsbro Konsortiet. The consortium was given responsibility for the construction and operation of the link.

Mainly in Denmark, but also in Sweden, there was interest during construction in adding a bicycle lane at a cost of SEK 210 million (estimated by DTU), but the Swedish department of the bridge company said no.

The bridge was a recurring feature of Swedish political debate for decades. Many commentators opposed its construction on environmental grounds, as the consequence of the bridge was considered to be "that road transport will continue to increase rapidly", as Anders Wijkman, Secretary General of the Swedish Society for Nature Conservation, wrote in 1990. For the Centre Party, opposition to the bridge was long a central issue. Party leader Olof Johansson resigned from Carl Bildt's government in protest against the bridge. Since the bridge was built, however, criticism has all but died down.

=== Design competition and procurement ===
At the end of 1992, the Øresundsbro Konsortiet launched a competition for the design of the link. Six entries were submitted, including one designed by Santiago Calatrava and another by Norman Foster, but two others were selected for further development and procurement. The ASO Group (formed by Arup Group), with Georg Rotne as architect, proposed that the bridge itself be made mainly of steel in two levels, with highway on top and train traffic below. ØLC (Øresund Link Consultants) instead placed highway and rail in the same plane on a concrete bridge. Both groups advocated an inclined cable-stayed bridge over the Flintrännan. The procurement of the entire Øresund Link was divided into different contracts, including one contract for the two access bridges and another for the main span. In November 1995, Sundlink Contractors (a consortium of Skanska, Hochtief, Højgaard & Schultz and Monberg & Thorsen) was able to sign a contract with the Øresundsbro Konsortiet to build both the access bridges and the main span in accordance with the ASO Group's proposal, at a cost of DKK 6.8 billion (including a viaduct at Peberholm). For the preparation of its tender, Sundlink had engaged the services of the engineering consultants COWI from Denmark and VBB from Sweden. They were now tasked with developing the proposals in detail and controlling the further work.

Only in 1995, the Øresundsbro Konsortiet informed the European Commission of guarantees granted by the Danish and Swedish States in favour of the Consortium for the financing of the Øresund Fixed Link and asked the commission to confirm that the State guarantees did not constitute State aid. The Danish and Swedish States have never formally notified to the commission the financing model of the Øresund Fixed Link. On 17 April 2013 the commission received a complaint alleging that the State guarantees granted by the Danish and Swedish States in favour of the Consortium constitutes unlawful State aid. Finally in July 2014 the European Commission approved the public involvement as not being state aid in the meaning of the European treaties.

=== Requirements and design ===
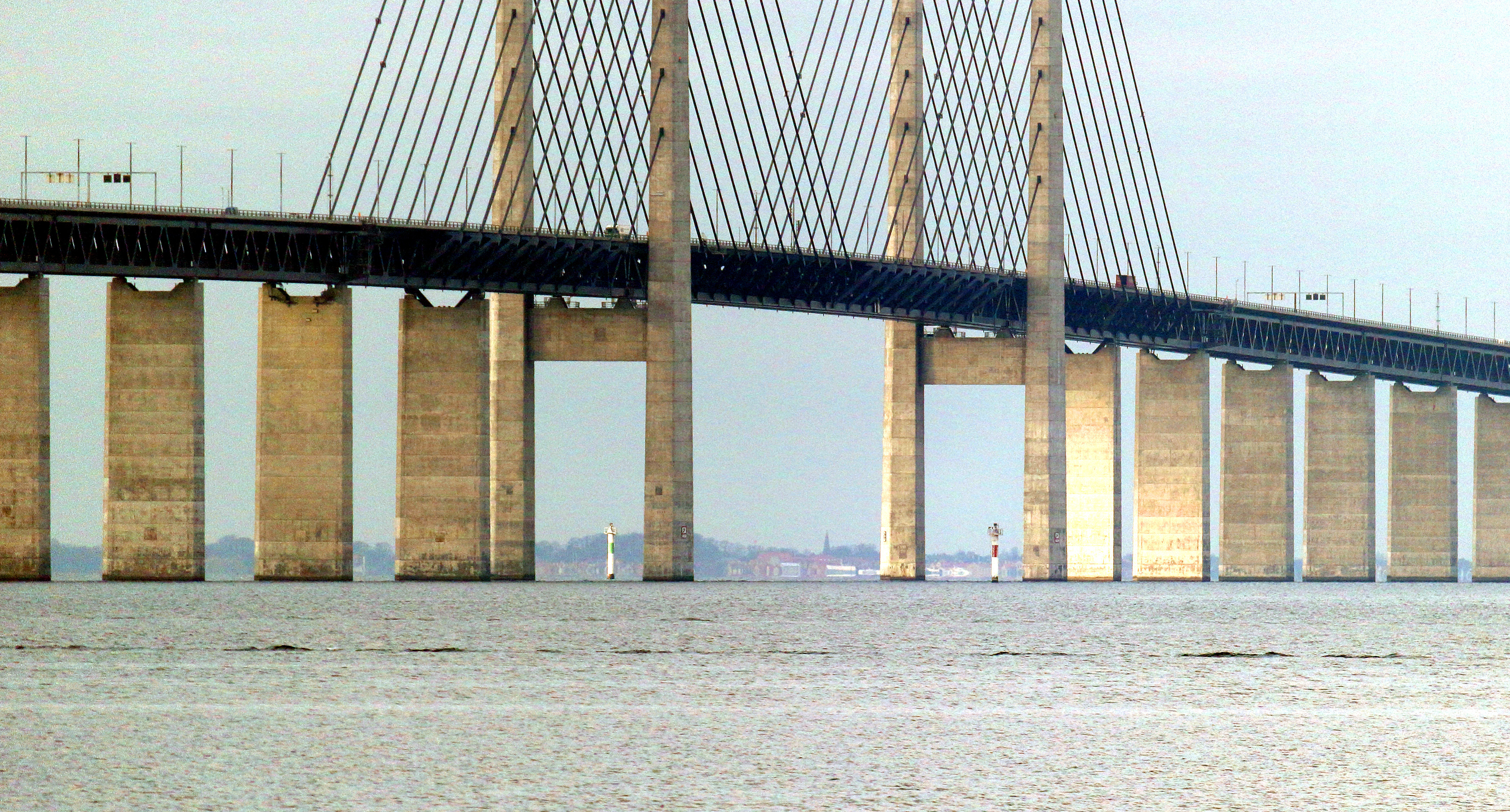
Main span, vertical clearance is 57 m (187 ft)

The owners had set high safety and environmental standards for the contractors. Among other things, the bridges had to:

- Withstand collisions from ships and aircraft as well as earthquakes (the piers had to withstand forces of 210 MN and the spans 35 MN)
- Withstand fast passenger trains (200 km/h (120 mph)) and heavy freight trains (max 120 km/h (75 mph))
- Withstand road traffic at 120 km/h (75 mph)
- Withstand high wind speeds (61 m/s)
- Have a lifespan of at least 100 years
- Leave the flow of water through the Sound unaffected

The bedrock under the Sound consists of Copenhagen limestone of very varied composition. Many borehole samples were therefore taken in the area before the detailed design of the bridge. Sundlink had great freedom to design details and processes within the owners' specifications. Changes were made on an ongoing basis, but only at a detailed level. A decisive factor was the availability of the world's largest hammerhead crane barge, the Svanen (the Swan). The crane was built in 1991 for the construction of the Great Belt Bridge and was subsequently used in the construction of the Confederation Bridge in Canada. With the detailed planning of the Øresund Bridge already underway, it became clear that the Svanen would be available earlier than expected, just in time for the Øresund Bridge spans to be put in place. The Svanen's large lifting capacity meant that the length of the spans could be increased from the planned 120 m (390 ft) to 141 m (463 ft). Fewer piers were thus needed, which was favorable for the flow of water through the Sound.

Sundlink used many subcontractors from different countries with different languages and cultures. Since the countries could have different terminology and standards, it was decided to use the then rather untested European standards for structural design, the Eurocodes. Sundlink also set up its own facility at Norra hamnen (Northern port) in Malmö for concrete casting, assembly and logistics.

=== Construction ===
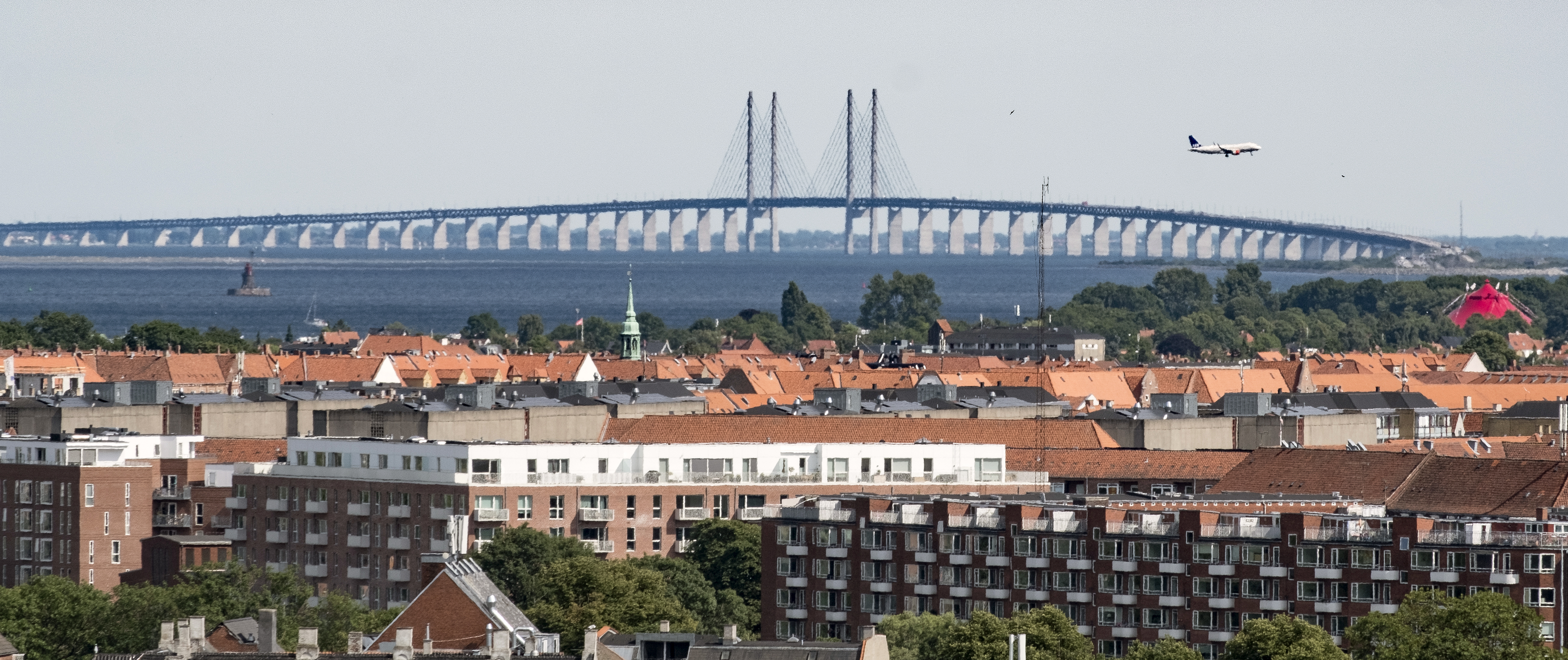
The Øresund Bridge. Copenhagen in the foreground. An aircraft is seen landing at Copenhagen Airport

An OMEGA centre report identified the following as primary motivations for construction of the bridge:

- to improve transport links in northern Europe, from Hamburg to Oslo;
- regional development around the Øresund as an answer to the intensifying globalisation process and Sweden's decision to apply for membership of the European Community;
- connecting the two largest cities of the region, which were both experiencing economic difficulties;
- improving transport connections to Copenhagen airport, the main flight transport hub in the region.

Sundlink Contractors (who also did the previous Great Belt Fixed Link) began construction of the bridge in 1995 and completed it 14 August 1999. Crown Prince Frederik of Denmark and Crown Princess Victoria of Sweden met midway across the bridge-tunnel on 14 August 1999 to celebrate its completion. The official dedication took place on 1 July 2000, with Queen Margrethe II of Denmark and King Carl XVI Gustaf of Sweden as the hostess and host of the ceremony. Because of the death of nine people, including three Danes and three Swedes, at the Roskilde Festival the evening before, the ceremony opened with a minute of silence. The bridge-tunnel opened for public traffic later that day. On 12 June 2000, two weeks before the dedication, 79,871 runners competed in Broloppet, a half marathon from Amager, Denmark, to Scania, Sweden.

Despite two schedule setbacks – the discovery of 16 unexploded World War II bombs on the seafloor and an inadvertently skewed tunnel segment – the bridge-tunnel was finished three months ahead of schedule.

Although traffic between Denmark and Sweden increased by 61 percent in the first year after the bridge opened, traffic levels were not as high as expected, perhaps due to high tolls. However, since 2005, traffic levels have increased rapidly. This may be due to Danes buying homes in Sweden to take advantage of lower housing prices in Malmö and commuting to work in Denmark. In 2012, to cross by car cost DKK 310, SEK 375 or €43, with discounts of up to 75% available to regular users. In 2007, almost 25 million people travelled over the Øresund Bridge: 15.2 million by car and bus and 9.6 million by train. By 2009, the figure had risen to 35.6 million by car, coach or train.

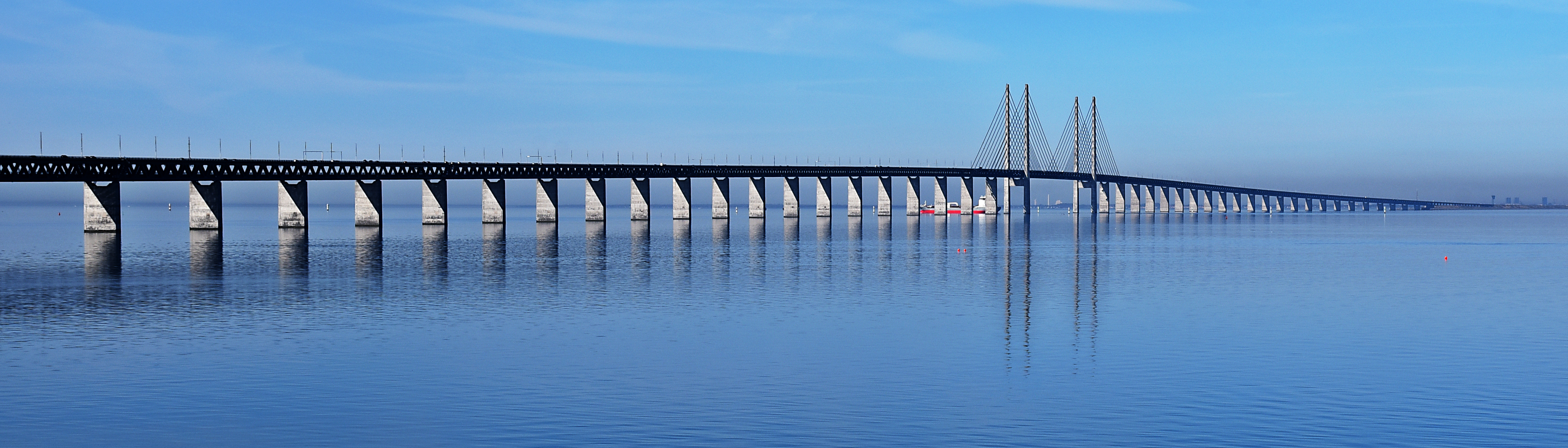
Øresund Bridge, Øresund

== Link features ==
=== Bridge ===
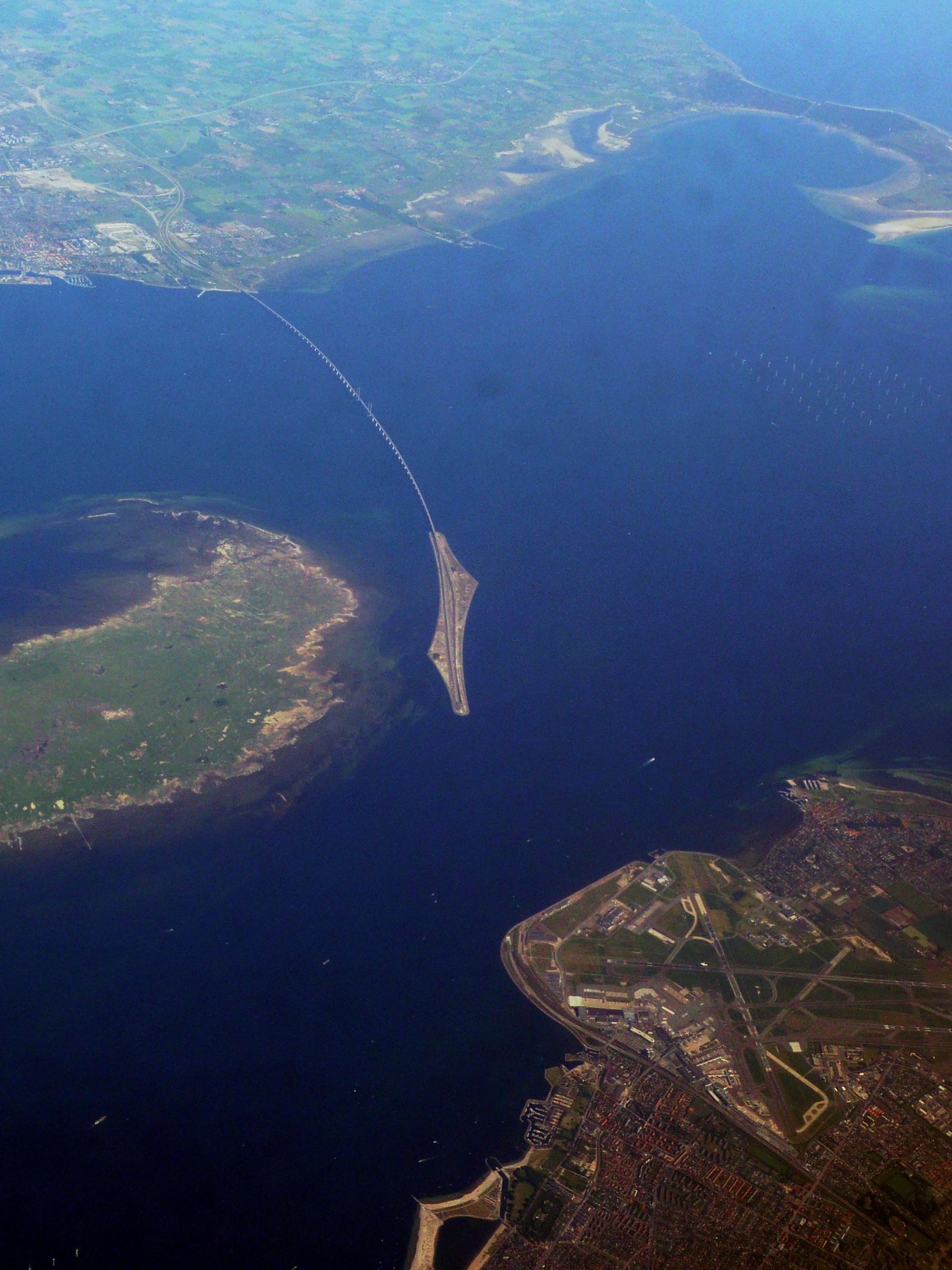
Aerial photo of Øresund Bridge. In the foreground is Copenhagen Airport on the island of Amager, to the left of the bridge is the Danish island of Saltholm, and in the background, the bridge connects to Malmö.

At 7.85 km (4.88 mi), the bridge covers half the distance between Sweden and the Danish island of Amager, the border between the two countries being 5.3 km (3.3 mi) from the Swedish end. The structure has a mass of 82,000 tonnes and supports two railway tracks beneath four road lanes in a horizontal girder extending along the entire length of the bridge. On both approaches to the three cable-stayed bridge sections, the girder is supported every 140 m (459 ft) by concrete piers. The two pairs of free-standing cable-supporting towers are 204 m (669 ft) tall allowing shipping 57 m (187 ft) vertical clearance under the main span, but most ships' captains prefer to pass through the unobstructed Drogden Strait above the Øresund Tunnel. The cable-stayed main span is 491 m (1,611 ft) long. A girder and cable-stayed design was chosen to provide the specific rigidity necessary to carry heavy rail traffic, and also to resist large accumulations of ice. The bridge experiences occasional brief closures during very severe weather, such as the St. Jude storm of October 2013.

=== Access bridges ===
The access bridges are made up of 49 steel trusses resting on concrete piers. The steel spans have a length of 141 m (463 ft) except at the bridge abutments, where they are shorter at 120 m (390 ft). They were manufactured by Dragados Offshore in Puerto Real near Cádiz, Spain, one of the few companies in Europe with sufficient capacity. Steel plates from British Steel were cut and welded together to form the various components of the truss spans, which were then joined to form 120–141 m (394–463 ft) long spans. These were fitted with a reinforced concrete roadway on the upper level and a concrete railway deck on the lower level. The finished sections were towed on barges to Sundlink's facility in Norra hamnen. Here, the spans were equipped with special concrete troughs for the railway tracks, footbridges along the tracks, etc. Stairs connect the road and railway levels every 700 m (2,300 ft). Three inspection gondolas are suspended under the bridge.

Diagram map showing the different parts of the Øresund Link

The piers are individually designed, taking into account the calculated load and the bedrock level, resulting in the bridge gradually reaching the 57 m (187 ft) vertical clearance of the main span. The pillars rest on concrete caissons fixed in the bedrock. The pylons of the main span, as well as three piers on either side of them, are surrounded by underwater reefs to reduce the risk of larger ships colliding with the bridge. Both caissons and pylons were manufactured in the Norra hamnen. The caissons, piers and truss spans were transported to their locations in the Sound by the Svanen crane barge. The bridge sections were welded together, but at regular intervals space was left for the thermal expansion of the steel.

=== Main span ===
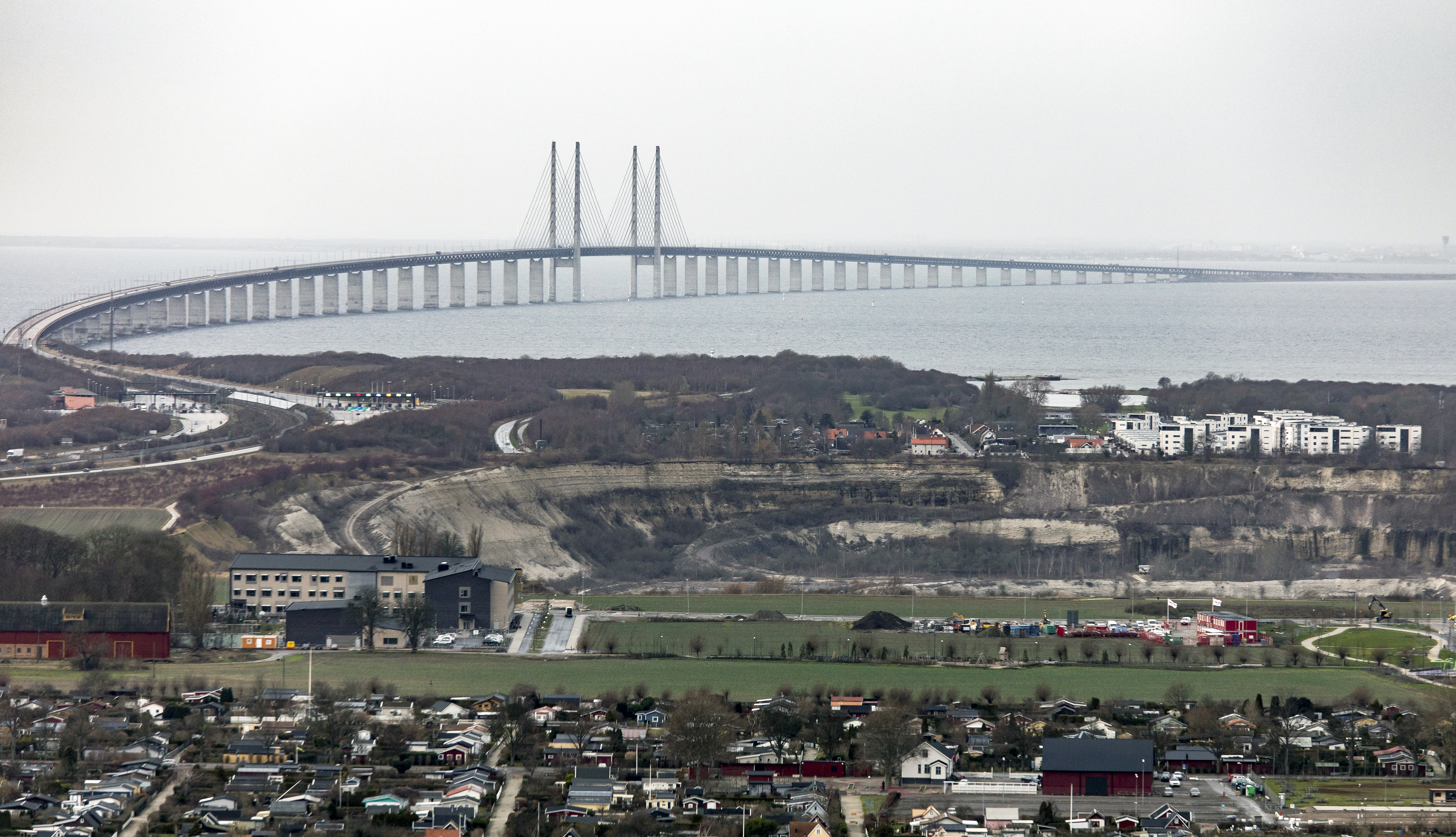
Access bridges and main span. Picture taken from Point Hyllie, Malmö.

The main span over the Flintrännan fairway is the world's longest cable-stayed bridge for both road and rail traffic. The choice to build a cable-stayed bridge instead of a suspension bridge was based, among other things, on the fact that a suspension bridge could have become unstable if a high-speed train or a heavy freight train were to brake sharply on such a bridge. The bridge is suspended by steel cables attached to 203.5 m (668 ft) tall pylons. The distance between the pylons is 490 m (1,610 ft) and the total length of the main span is 1,092 m (3,583 ft). The vertical clearance is 57 m (187 ft).

The upper level for vehicular traffic consists of a truss of steel beams supporting a concrete roadway. The lower level consists of a continuous railway deck, a sealed steel box. The two decks are held together by vertical trusses. Every thirty meters there are brackets, "outriggers", for suspension in the pylon cables. The steel span was built by Karlskronavarvet with the help of several Swedish and Norwegian subcontractors, including Kockums in Malmö, Norwegian Excon, SSAB in Oxelösund and Knislinge Mekaniska Verkstad. In the Norra hamnen of Malmö, the span was equipped with a concrete roadway, railroad tracks, etc. and could then be transported to the site by Svanen.

=== Pylons, bearings and cables ===
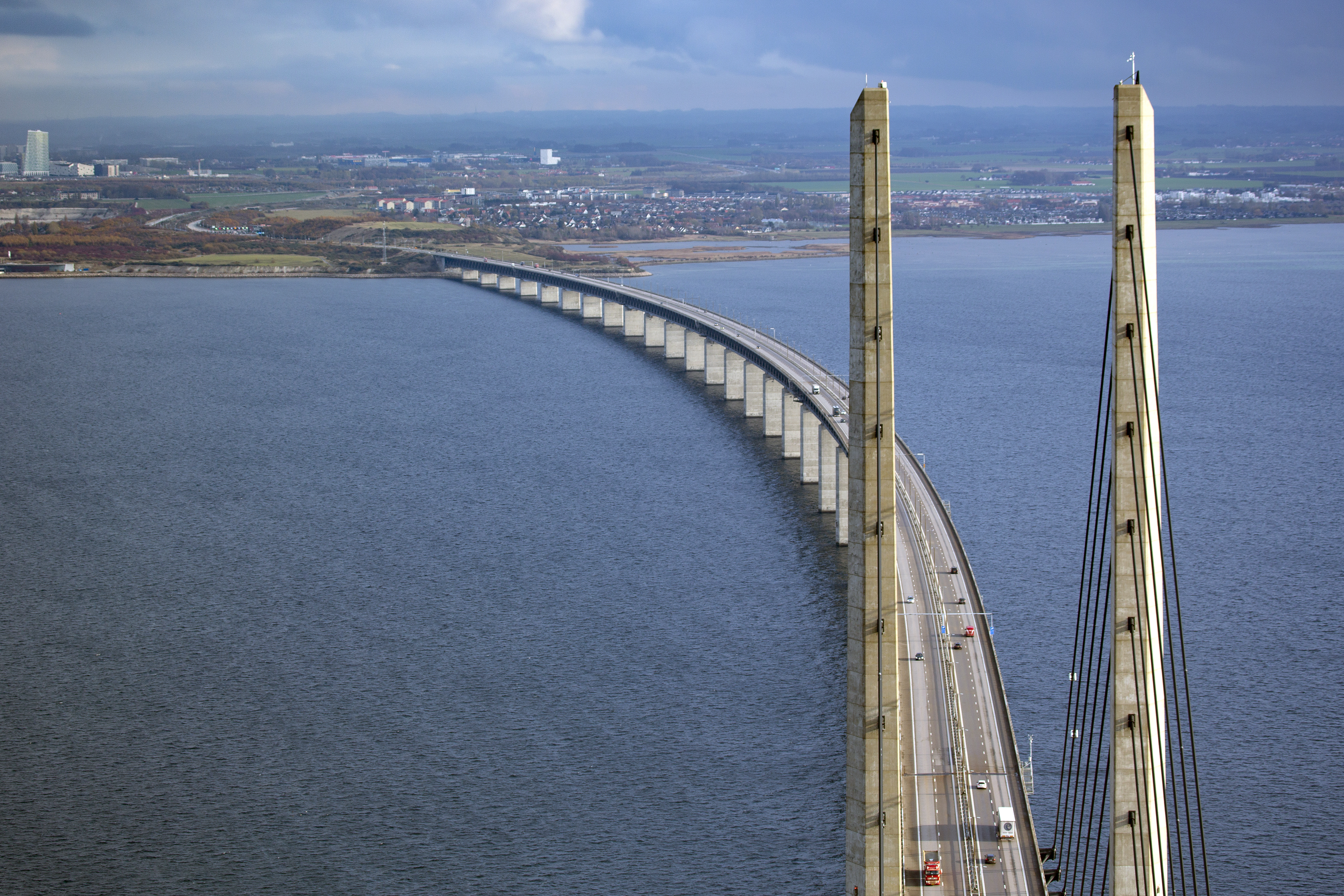
View of the Øresund Link. Photo taken from one of the pylons; Sweden is visible in the background.

The foundations of the pylons are hollow concrete caissons anchored in the limestone bedrock. They were manufactured in Kockums' dry dock in Malmö and towed to site. There they were filled with concrete and ballast. The pylons themselves were cast using equipment that climbed up the already completed sections. At a height of 50 m (160 ft), a concrete crossbeam 10 m (33 ft) high and 30 m (98 ft) wide was cast to connect each pair of pylons. Higher up, continuous steel elements were placed for the attachment of the stay cables. The pylons taper towards the top (cross-section at the bottom 9.4 m × 12.5 m (31 ft × 41 ft), at the top 4.7 m × 6.2 m (15 ft × 20 ft)). The outer sides are completely vertical while those facing inwards are slightly inclined.

Due to high longitudinal and transverse loads acting over the bridge and to accommodate movements between the superstructure and substructure, it has bearings weighing up to 20 t (44,000 lb) each, capable of bearing vertical loads up to 96,000 kN (22,000,000 lb_{f}) in a longitudinal direction and up to 40,000 kN (9,000,000 lb_{f}) in transverse direction. The design, manufacturing and installation of the bearings were carried out by the Swiss civil engineering firm mageba.

Vibration issues, caused by several cables in the bridge moving under certain wind and temperature conditions, were combatted with the installation of compression spring dampers installed in pairs at the centre of the cables. Two of these dampers were equipped with laser gauges for ongoing monitoring. Testing, development and installation of these spring dampers was carried out by specialists Lesjöfors.

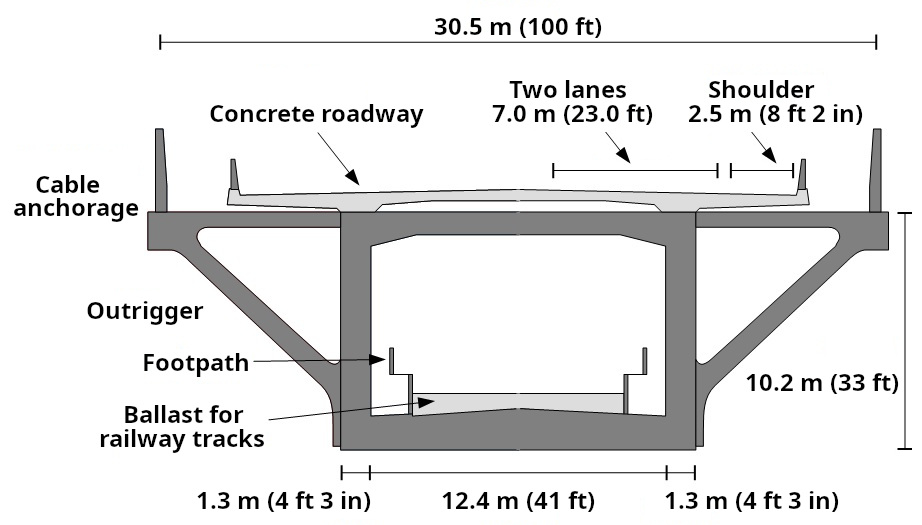
Cross section of the main span

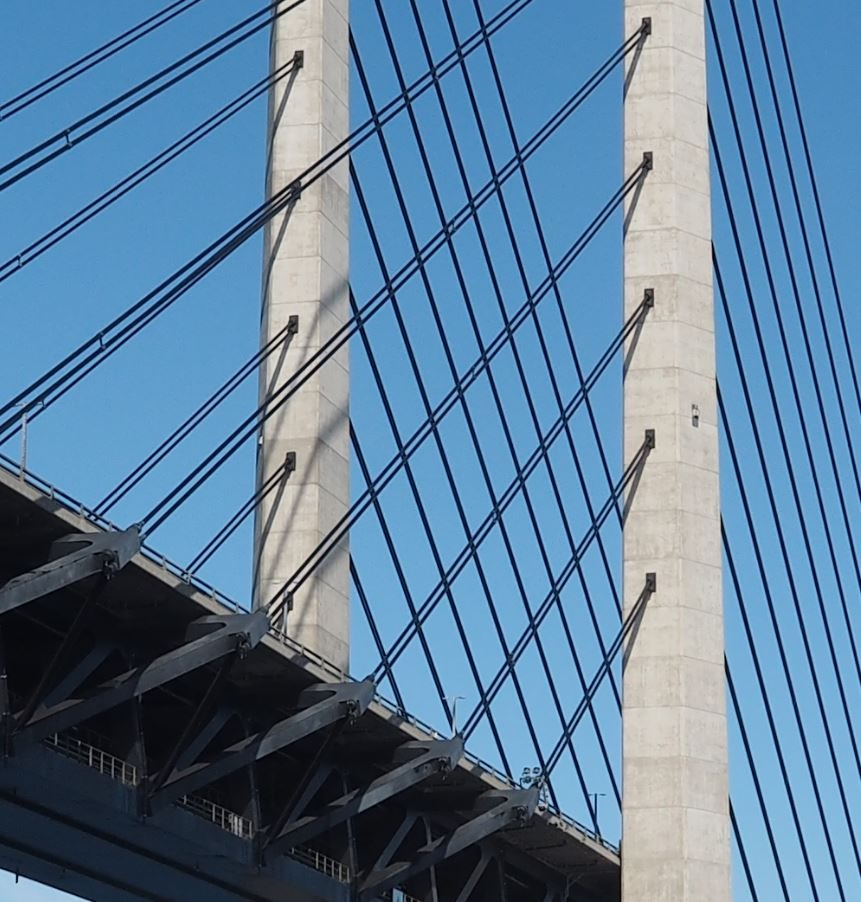
Outriggers, double stay cables and pylons

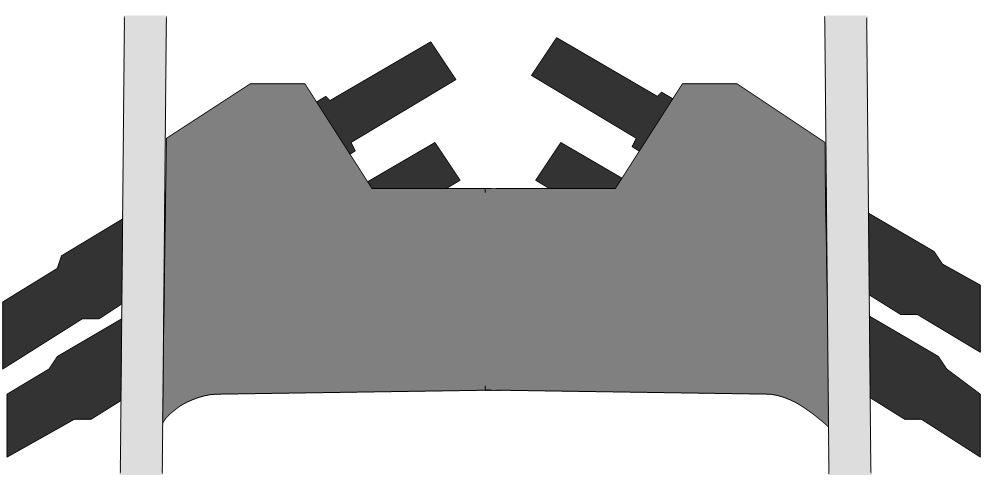
Steel element in a pylon for cable anchorage

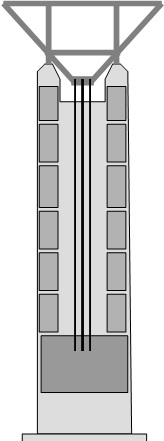
Stay cable anchor pier

The bridge span between the pylons is 490 m (1,610 ft) long. It is suspended by stay cables attached to the outriggers, two cables in each. The cables go to the cast-in steel elements in the pylons and the force is then transmitted through cables down to the outriggers of the outer bridge spans. The outer spans are anchored with pre-tensioned cables that run down through the piers.

=== Peberholm ===
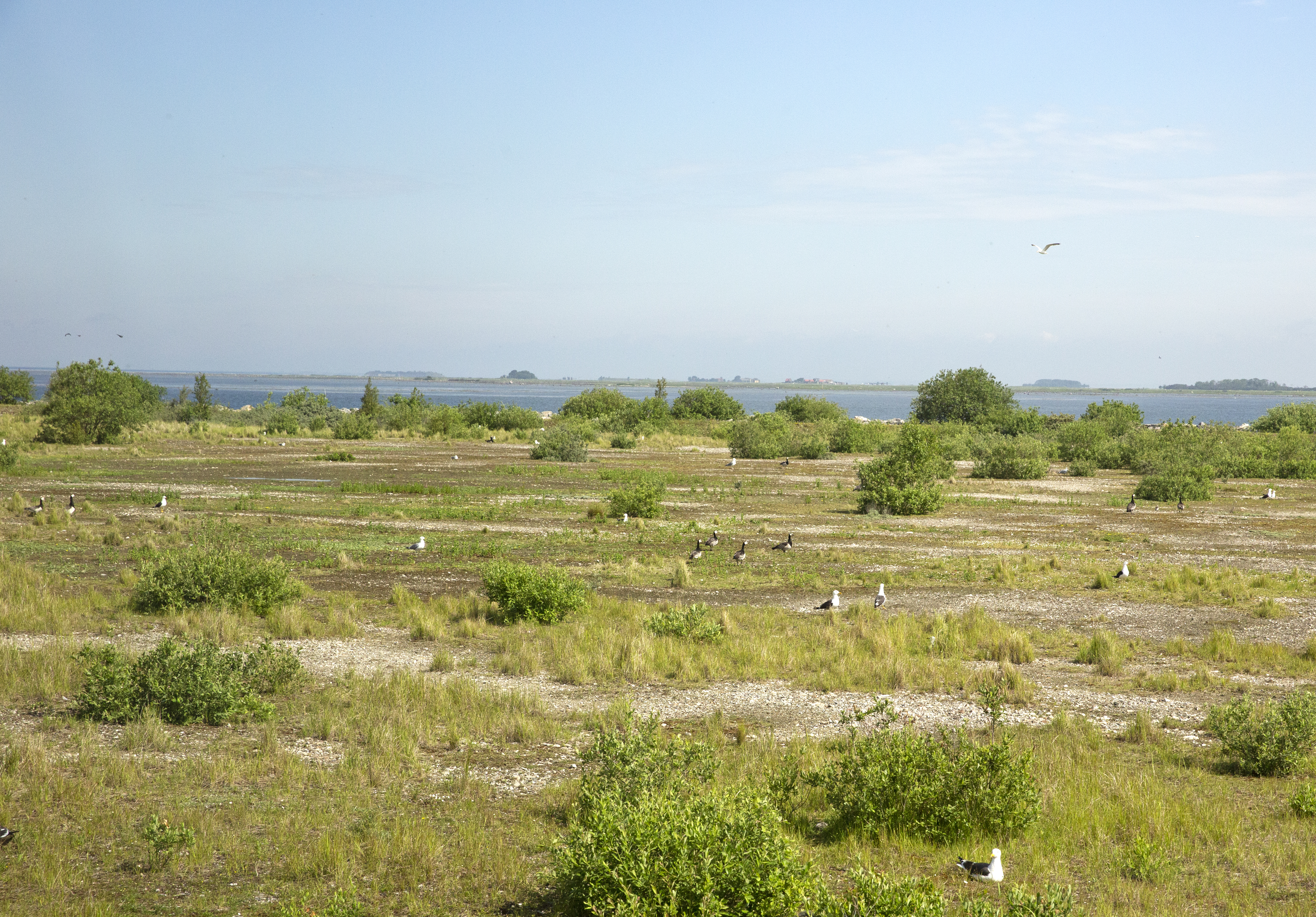
The artificial island of Peberholm, which is part of the Øresund Link, has a rich plant and animal life.

The western part of the bridge joins the Øresund Tunnel on Peberholm, an artificial island, just south of the island of Saltholm on the Danish side. The Danes chose the name Peberholm (Pepper Islet) to complement the natural island of Saltholm (Salt Islet). The island was built from dredged material from the bottom of the Sound and elsewhere. For instance, large stones from a rock construction site in Kungshamn, Bohuslän, came to line the island together with local Scanian stone from Dalby. Peberholm is approximately 4 km (2.5 mi) long with an average width of 500 m (1,640 ft) and is 20 m (66 ft) high.

At Peberholm, the railroad turns off the highway and runs parallel to the highway down into the Øresund Tunnel. On the island there is a junction where trains can be switched between the two tracks. Exits connect the highway with roads dedicated to maintenance work on the island. In addition, there is a helipad on the island for emergencies, for example in the event of a serious road accident.

Peberholm is a nature reserve and public visits are generally not allowed outside the highway. The island has been allowed to develop its own nature without active human intervention. Several rare species have established themselves on the island.

=== Øresund Tunnel ===
Cross section of the Øresund Tunnel

The connection between Peberholm and the likewise artificial peninsula at Kastrup on Amager island, the nearest populated part of Denmark, descend under the Drogden fairway, through the 4.05 km (2.52 mi) Øresund Tunnel (Øresundstunnelen). The tunnel comes up on Amager at Copenhagen Airport. The main reason for continuing the link underwater, and not on a bridge, is that a bridge would pose a risk to air traffic to and from the airport.

It comprises a 3.51 km (2.18 mi) immersed tube plus 270 m (890 ft) entry tunnels at each end. At the descent into the tunnel, the railroad turns and runs right next to the highway. The tube tunnel is made from 20 prefabricated reinforced concrete segments – the largest in the world at 55,000 tonnes each – interconnected in a trench dug in the seabed. Two tubes in the tunnel carry railway tracks, two carry roads and a small fifth tube is provided for emergencies. The tubes are arranged side by side. For safety reasons, freight trains carrying dangerous goods cannot be in the same tunnel tube at the same time as other trains, which reduces capacity slightly.

=== Land connections ===
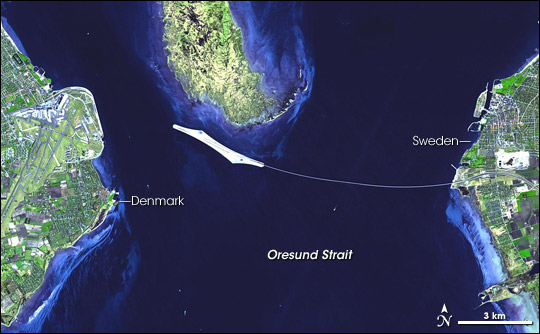
Satellite image of the Øresund Bridge

Land connections link the Øresund Link to Danish and Swedish roads and railways. The highway connects to the Outer Ring Road in Malmö and the Øresundsmotorvejen (the Øresund Highway) in Copenhagen. The Øresund Line connects to Copenhagen Central Station on the Danish side and the Malmö City Tunnel and the Continental Line on the Swedish side.

On the Danish side, the Copenhagen Airport railway station is situated right at Copenhagen Airport, just west of the Øresund Tunnel entrance. Next to it is the Lufthavnen station of the Copenhagen Metro. There are also connecting tracks to a maintenance workshop. A separate freight track allows freight trains to pass without going past the platforms. However, the crossing freight trains reduce capacity and further measures are required in the foreseeable future to increase the capacity of the railway around Copenhagen Airport.

On the Swedish side, the Malmö City Tunnel was only completed at the end of 2010, more than a decade after the opening of the Øresund Link. Before that, all trains had to run on the Continental Line around Malmö. In Malmö, trains going further north had to turn around because the station was a terminus. The Malmö City Tunnel now allows trains to travel directly between the Øresund Link and Malmö Central Station through a tunnel under the city.

== Traffic ==
Traffic over the Øresund Link consists of both road and rail traffic. Traffic volumes increased sharply in the first years of the link, reaching saturation around 2008. This was followed by a minor decline, the 2008 financial crisis, and a more dramatic one, the COVID-19 recession. Recently, traffic in 2024 reached 15 million rail passengers, the highest to date.

=== Road traffic ===
Number of vehicles across the Øresund Bridge (millions per year and category)

Road traffic over the link consists mainly of passenger cars, goods vehicles and trucks. A small proportion of traffic is made up of buses and motorcycles. Around seven million vehicles cross the link each year, of which around 90% are passenger cars. During most of the year, around half a million vehicles pass through per month, while during the summer, traffic amounts to more than 800 000 vehicles per month.

=== Rail transport ===
Rail passenger traffic across the Øresund Bridge (millions per year)

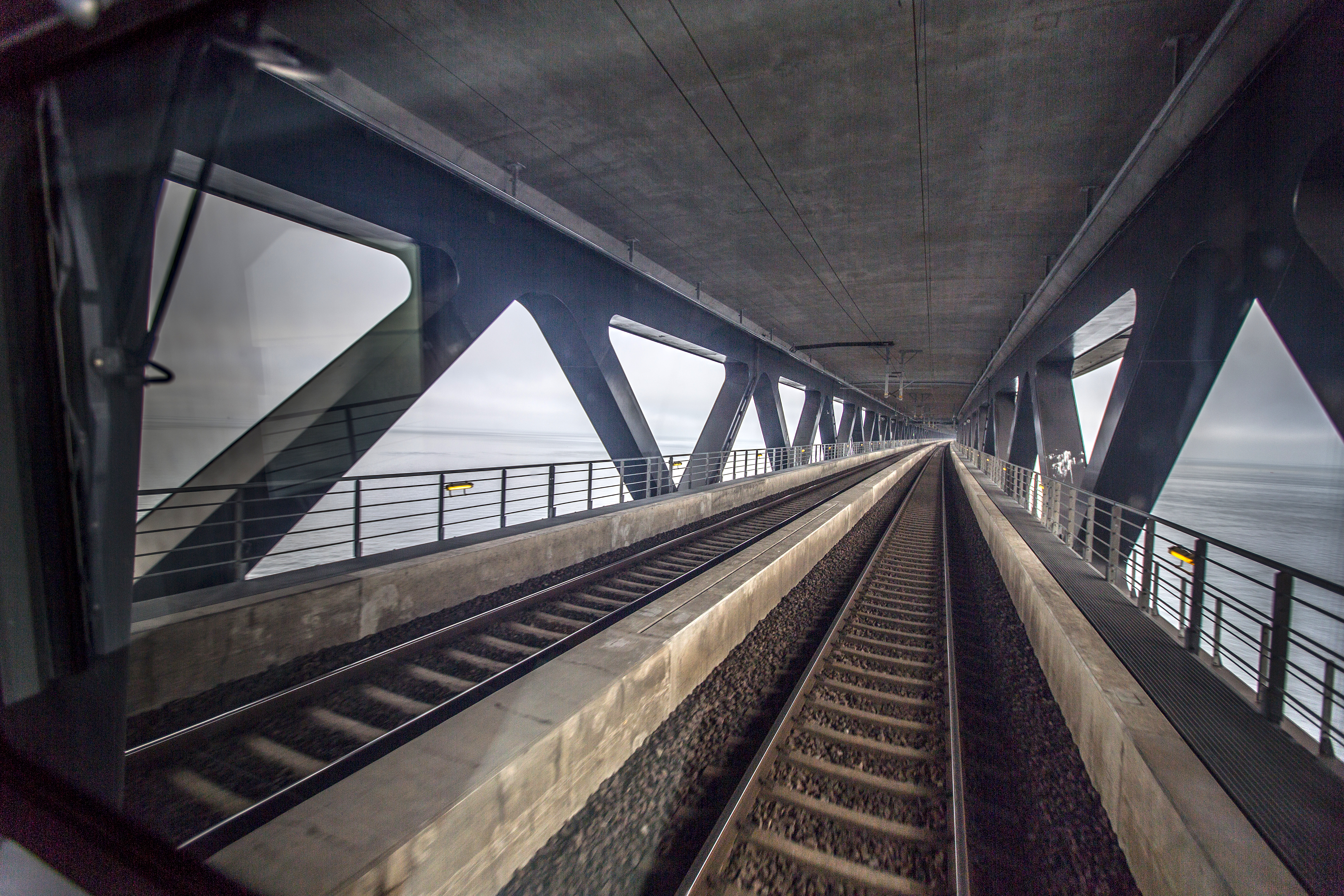
The lower railway level of the bridge

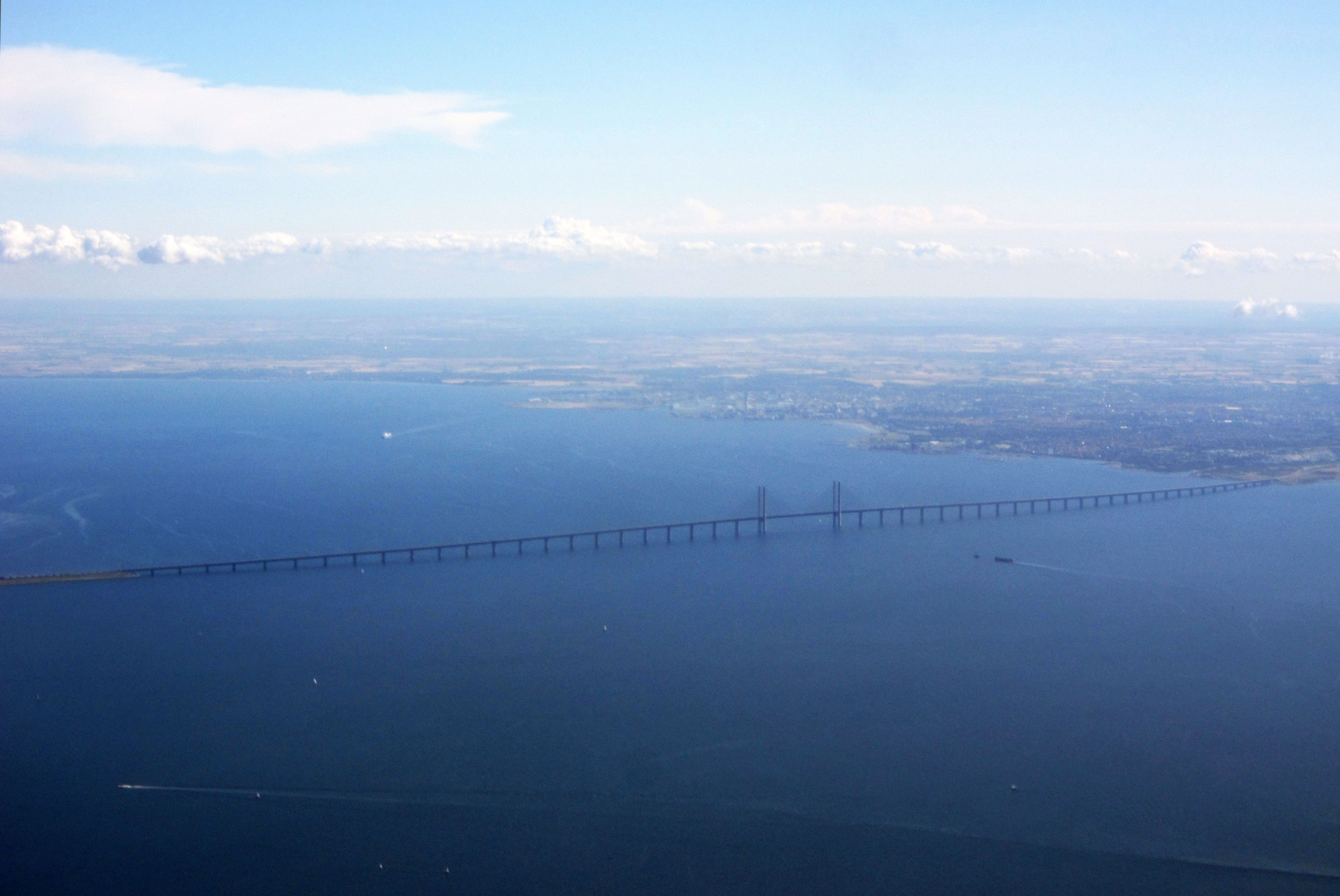
The bridge's full stretch between Peberholm and Malmö

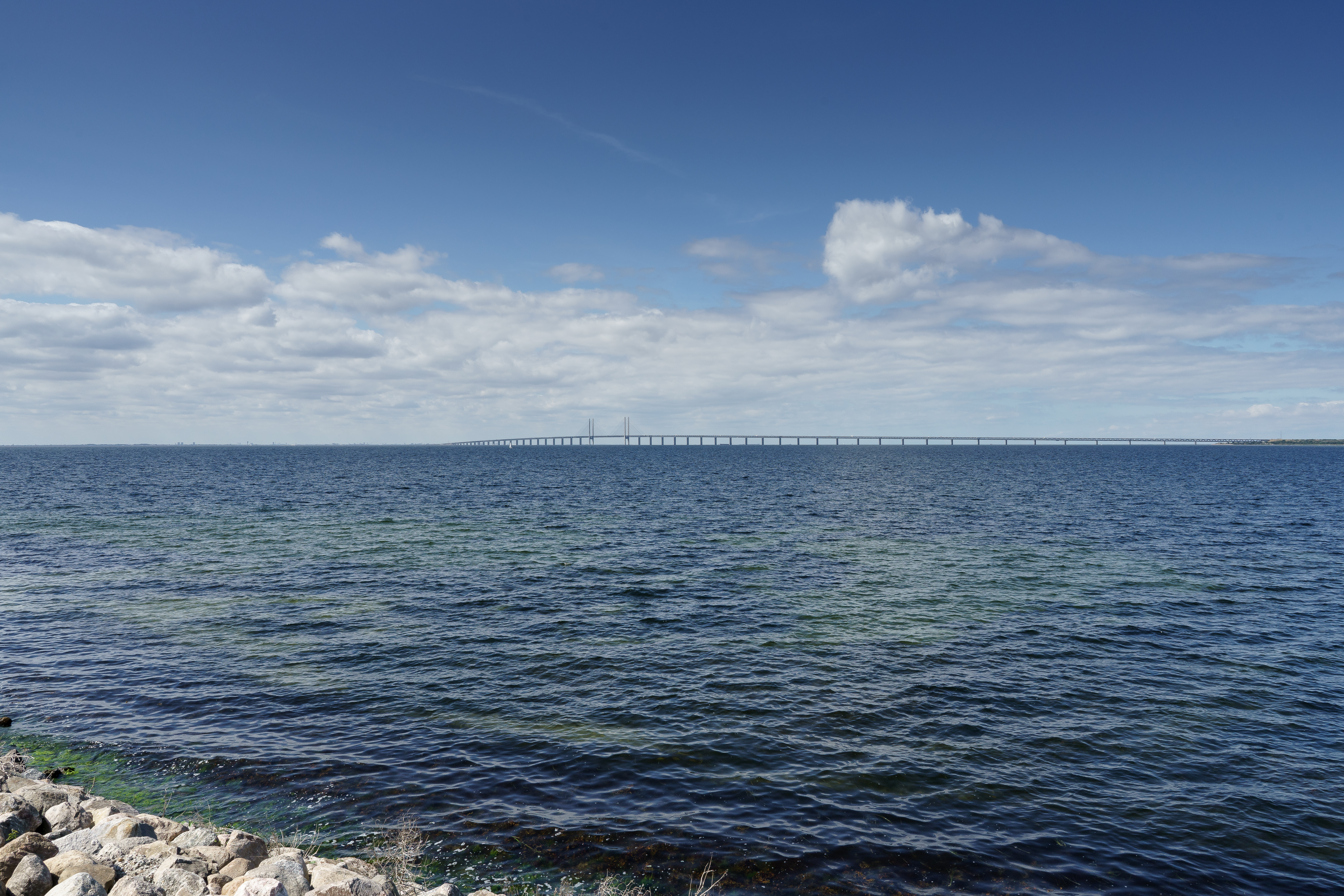
View from Klagshamn

The rail link is operated jointly by the Swedish Transport Administration (Trafikverket) and the Danish railway infrastructure manager Banedanmark. Passenger train service is commissioned by Skånetrafiken and the Danish Civil Aviation and Railway Authority (Trafikstyrelsen) under the Øresundståg ("Øresund train") brand, with Transdev being the current operator. A series of new dual-voltage trains was developed, linking the Copenhagen area with Malmö and southern Sweden as far as Gothenburg, Karlskrona and Kalmar. Copenhagen Airport at Kastrup has its own railway station close to the western bridgehead. Since December 2022, trains operate typically every 15 minutes during the day, reducing to once an hour during the night in both directions. Additional Øresundstrains are operated at rush hour. Freight trains also use the crossing.

The rail section is double track 1,435 mm (4 ft 8 1/2 in) standard gauge and capable of speeds of up to 200 kilometres per hour (120 mph), but slower in Denmark, especially in the tunnel section. There were challenges related to the difference in electrification and signalling between the Danish and Swedish railway networks. The solution chosen is to switch the electrical system from Swedish 15 kV, 16.7 Hz to Danish 25 kV, 50 Hz before the eastern bridgehead at Lernacken in Sweden. The Swedish signaling system (ATC) is used with Swedish optical signals on the bridge and switches to Danish ATC on the western part of Peberholm, 7 km (4.3 mi) into Danish territory, which has been justified by the fact that the Swedish system allows higher speed (200 km/h (120 mph)) and costs less to install. There is no way of changing between a locomotive for Danish standard and one for Swedish standard. All rail vehicles using the bridge must be custom made for the standards of both countries.

Trains run on the left in Sweden, and on the right in Denmark. Initially the switch was made at Malmö Central Station, a terminus at that time. After the 2010 inauguration of the Malmö City Tunnel connection, a tunnel was built at Burlöv, north of Malmö, where the two southbound tracks cross over the northbound pair. The railway in Malmö thus uses the Danish standard.

The gradient of the bridge is 1.56%, which is clearly more than what is desired for freight trains, especially on a busy line such as the Øresund Line, where fewer but heavier freight trains are desirable. The Danish Litra EG locomotives are 6-axle to cope with pulling heavy freight trains across Øresund and the Great Belt Bridge. Other locomotives, such as the BR185, can also haul freight trains, but the wagon weight is limited to 1800 tons.

== Border checks ==
The border between Denmark and Sweden runs about 900 m (3,000 ft) west of the western pylon of the Øresund Bridge, which is about 100 m (330 ft) east of the national border signs mounted on the nearest existing posts.

As the link is Sweden's national border, Swedish Customs carry out checks on vehicles directly after the toll booth at Lernacken. It is also the busiest border crossing in Sweden. The Swedish Customs carry out checks when smuggling is suspected. The Øresund Bridge is the Swedish border where most drug seizures are made. Checks on Øresundståg (Øresund trains) (towards Sweden) are carried out to prevent drugs and other illicit goods from entering Sweden.

With both Sweden and Denmark being part of the Nordic Passport Union since the 1950s, border controls between the two countries have been abolished for decades and travellers can normally move freely across the Øresund Bridge. In 2001, both countries also joined the Schengen area, and since then the abolition of border controls is primarily regulated by European Union law, more specifically the Schengen acquis.

However, in November 2015, during the European migrant crisis, Sweden introduced temporary border controls at the border to Denmark in accordance with the provisions of the Schengen acquis on the reintroduction of temporary internal border controls. As such, travellers into Sweden from Denmark (but not travellers into Denmark from Sweden) must show a valid passport or national ID card (citizens of EU/EEA countries) or passport and entry visa (if required) for nationals of other non-EU/EEA countries. The move marked a break with 60 years of border control free travel between the Nordic countries. In January 2016, these border measures were extended by a special carriers' liability, forcing carriers (such as bus, train and ferry companies) to check the identity of all passengers from Denmark before they boarded a bus, train or ferry to Sweden.

In May 2017, Sweden removed the carriers' liability, but the ordinary border controls carried out by the Swedish Police Authority remained on the Swedish side of the Øresund Bridge. In accordance with the Schengen Borders Code, these border controls are only allowed for a period of six months at a time, and therefore have to be renewed twice a year. Currently (April 2025), the advice at the Öresundståg site is "you need to bring valid ID with you" when travelling by train across the bridge.

== Costs and benefits ==
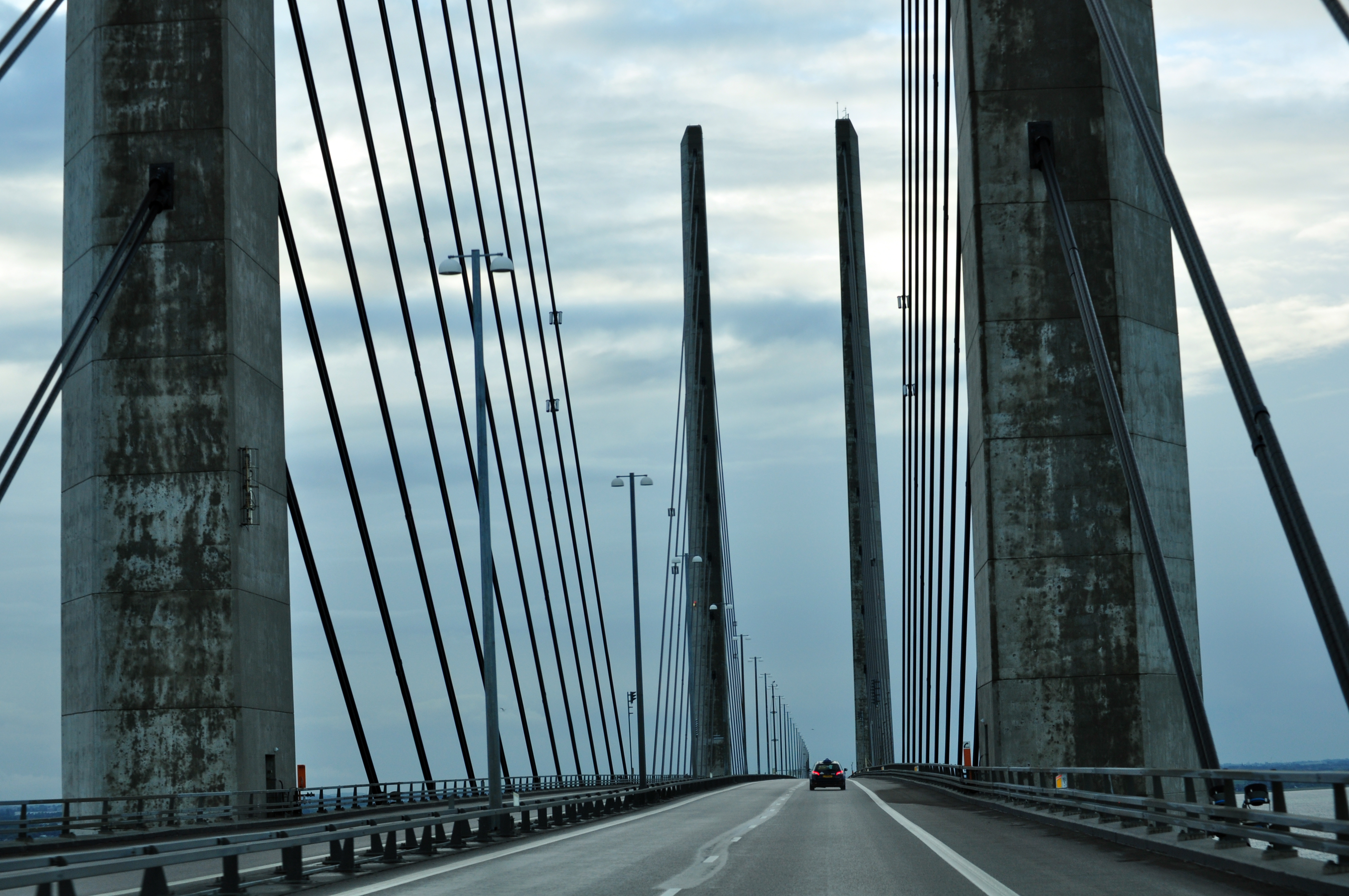
On the bridge. The scale of the 203.5 m (668 ft) tall pylons visible.

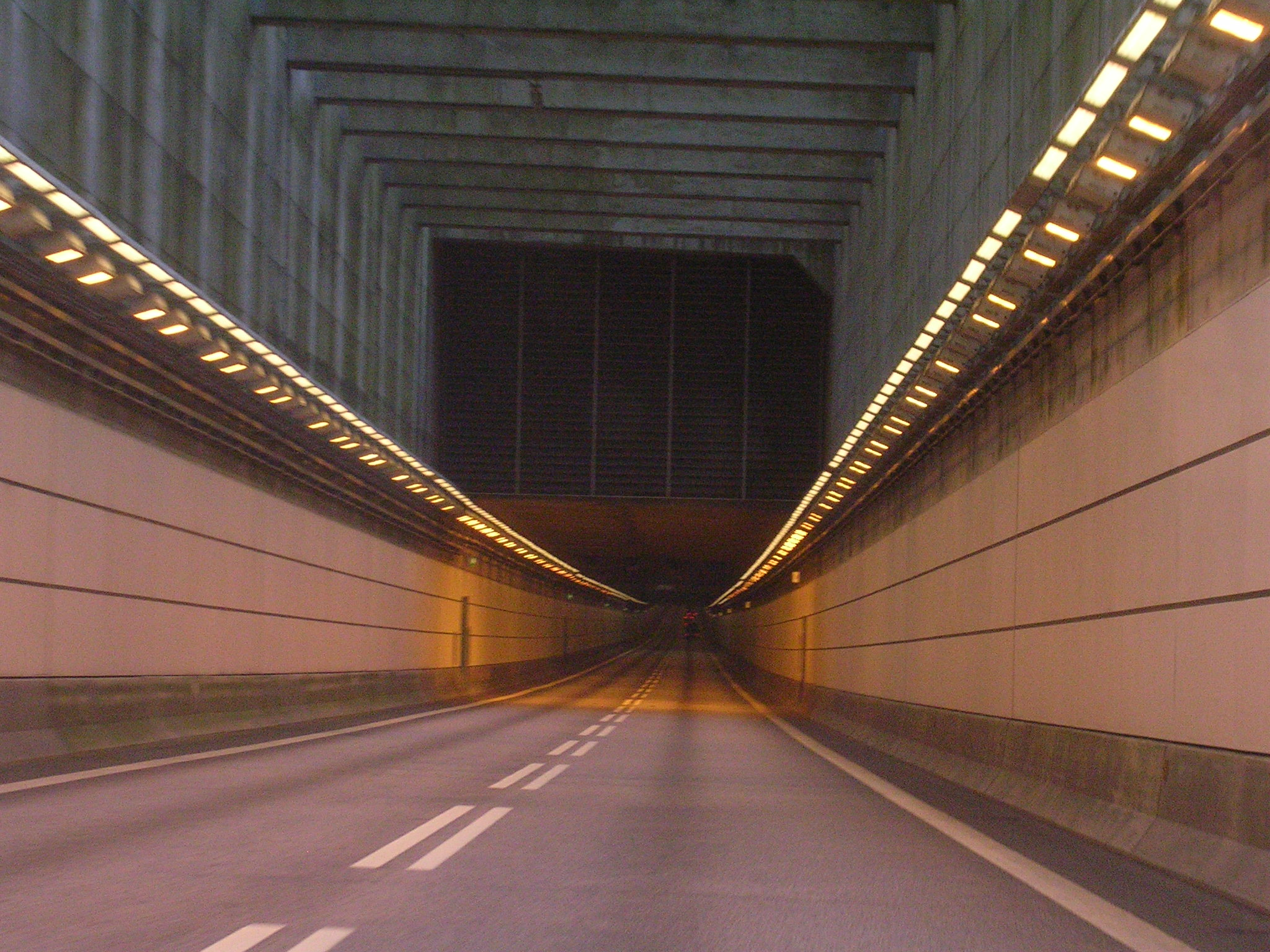
In the tunnel

The cost of the Øresund Link, including motorway and railway connections on land, was DKK 30.1 billion (~€4.0 billion) according to the 2000 year price index, with the cost of the bridge expected in 2003 to be recouped by 2037. In 2006, Sweden began work on the Malmö City Tunnel, a SEK 9.45 billion connection with the bridge that was completed in December 2010.

The Link will be entirely user-financed. The owner company, Øresundsbro Konsortiet, is in turn owned in equal parts by the Danish state and the Swedish state. Øresundsbro Konsortiet has taken loans guaranteed by the governments to finance the Link and the user fees are its only income. After the increase in traffic, these fees are enough to pay the interest and begin repaying the loans, which is expected to take about 30 years.

Taxpayers have neither paid for the bridge nor the tunnel, but tax money has been used for the land connections. On the Danish side, the land connection has domestic benefits, mainly to connect the airport to the railway network. The Malmö City Tunnel has the benefit of connecting the southern part of the inner city to the rail network and enabling many more trains to and from Malmö.

According to The Öresund Committee, the bridge has made a national economic gain of DKK 57 billion, or SEK 78 billion SEK (~€8.41 billion) on both sides of the strait by increased commuting and lower commuting expense. The gain is estimated to be SEK 6.5 billion per year but this could be increased to 7.7 billion by removing the three biggest obstacles to integration and mobility, the two largest being that non-EU nationals in Sweden are not allowed to work in Denmark and that many professional qualifications and merits are not mutually recognised.

A 2021 study found that the bridge led to an increase in innovation in Malmö. The key mechanism appears to be that high-skilled workers were drawn to Malmö. A 2022 study found that the bridge caused an increase of 13.5% in the average wage of workers in the region, as the bridge expanded the size of the labor market.

== Aesthetic considerations ==
A bridge should not have an overly fancy design. A bridge should express strength.

— Georg Rotne

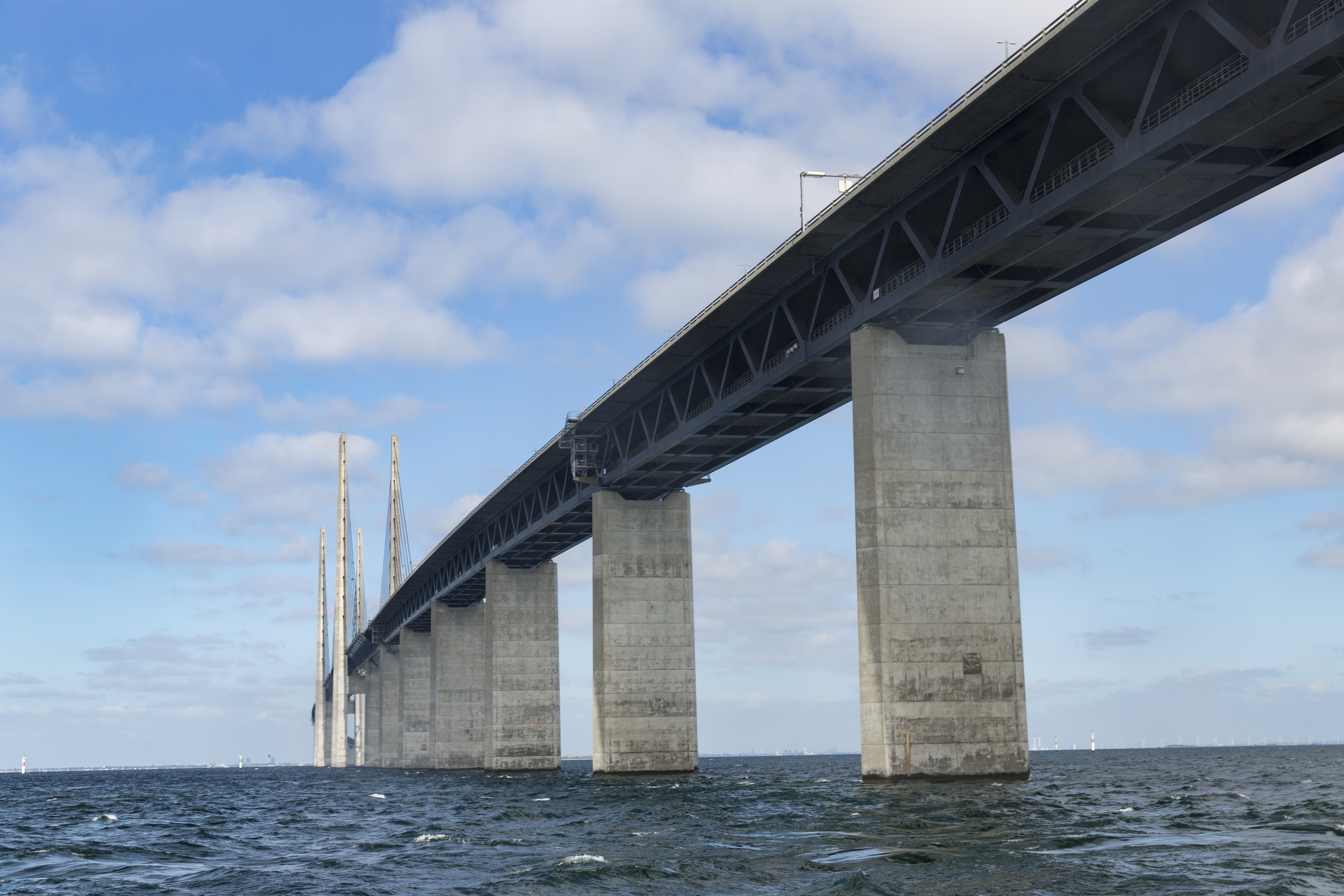
View from below, looking west

The Øresund Bridge has been criticized for being too "brutalist". Other critics have lamented that the project did not dare to take risks, that it relied on tried and true solutions. Danish architect Georg Rotne wanted to create a powerful bridge. All steel details are painted black. The pylons are illuminated at night but nothing else of the bridge. Some details of the design have no purely technical or economic justification but are added for aesthetic reasons:

- The Øresundsbro Konsortiet wanted a straight bridge. Rotne, on the other hand, wanted the bridge to be slightly S-shaped. The compromise was a C-shaped bridge. The curvature is hardly noticeable to road users but is clearly visible when seen from land. Experience from straight stretches of several kilometers or miles of long-distance roads shows that they increase the risk of drivers falling asleep.
- The access bridges rise gradually from the abutments up to the main span. It would have been economically rational to leave the bridges at low level for a longer distance.
- Other similar bridges tend to have one or more high crossbeams between the pylons. This can make them look like giant rugby goals, according to Rotne. Instead, the pylons of the Øresund Bridge rise freely 150 m (490 ft) upwards from the bridge span, which has required extra reinforcement.
- The pylons and the piers of the main span (but not the piers of the access bridges) have pentagonal cross-sections, although rectangular pylons and columns would have worked equally well.

== Possible future development ==
There are no firm plans for an extension of the Øresund Link or a new complementary link. However, there are several different proposals for a new complementary link.

- HH Tunnel: A Helsingborg-Helsingør train tunnel has been proposed. The municipality of Helsingborg has carried out a study with cost calculations and has reserved land etc. The proposal includes a double-track passenger train tunnel and a single-track freight train tunnel. A new Helsingør-Copenhagen railway would be required.
- Öresund Metro: A Copenhagen-Malmö metro tunnel has been proposed, an extension of the Copenhagen Metro. A study has been carried out on the initiative of the cities of Copenhagen and Malmö, which shows that it may be justifiable in the longer term.
- Europaspåret: A Landskrona–Copenhagen tunnel has been highlighted as an option in a study. Landskrona is roughly in line with Copenhagen's northern suburbs and a tunnel could hypothetically run diagonally across the strait and connect to the Danish rail network in the northern parts of the Danish capital. The proposal is based on the fact that this route is the closest route to Copenhagen from the parts of Sweden north of Malmö as it avoids both Helsingør and Malmö. It is estimated that the travel time would be reduced by about ten minutes for travelers from Lund.
- A new Øresund link was called for in 2010 by, among others, the chairman of the Malmö city council and the Social Democrats' spokesperson on infrastructure issues.
- A freight train tunnel between Peberholm and Hvidovre, west of the island of Amager, was proposed by the then-Danish Minister for Transport, Henrik Dam Kristensen. There are safety requirements that prohibit passenger trains and freight trains carrying dangerous goods simultaneously using the same tunnel tube. With the current signaling system, the Kastrup-Ørestad railway line is close to the maximum limit of its capacity.

== Cultural references ==
- The bridge lends its name to the Nordic noir television series The Bridge, which is set in the region around the bridge.
- When Malmö hosted the Eurovision Song Contest 2013, the bridge was the inspiration for a similar element in the set design, symbolising the connection between Sweden and the rest of Europe.
- The bridge was the inspiration behind the 2014 song "Walk Me to the Bridge" by Manic Street Preachers from their album Futurology.

== Environmental effects ==
The underwater parts of the bridge have become covered in marine organisms and act as an artificial reef.

== See also ==
- Fehmarn Belt Fixed Link
- HH Tunnel, a proposed second Øresund fixed link connecting Helsingør and Helsingborg
- List of bridge–tunnels
- List of road-rail bridges
- List of international bridges
- Old Little Belt Bridge (opened 1935) and New Little Belt Bridge (opened 1970)
- Øresund Region
- Øresundsmetro
- Hong Kong–Zhuhai–Macau Bridge – connecting Hong Kong, Macau and Zhuhai
- Johor–Singapore Causeway – between Malaysia and Singapore
- Mumbai Trans Harbour Link. Massive 10.83 kilometres (6.73 mi) long Expressway to connect Mumbai with Navi Mumbai.

== Bibliography ==
- Øresundskonsortiet (1998). Den faste forbindelse over Øresund : design og konstruktion (in Danish). København. ISBN 91-630-7628-4. OCLC 873709859.

Records
Preceded by Great Belt Fixed Link West Bridge	Europe's longest railway bridge 2000 – 2019	Succeeded by Crimean Bridge
