= Drogden =

Shipping channel in Øresund

Coordinates: 55°36′8″N 12°42′35″E

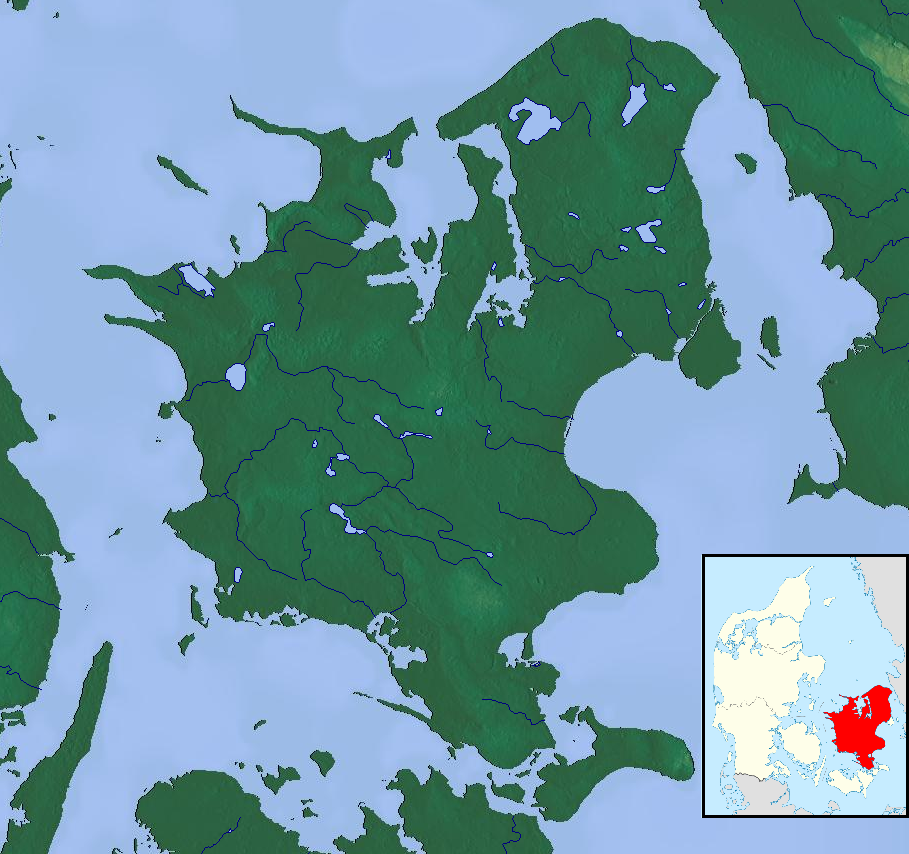
Location of Drogden, between Saltholm and Amager.

Drogden is a channel through Øresund. The trench is located on the Danish side of the Øresund, between Saltholm and Amager. The road and railway connection between Denmark and Sweden passes below it in the Drogden Tunnel. The maximum depth for ships to pass is 8 meters. Drogden is heavily trafficked, and about 30,000 ships pass per year in the fairway.
