= Mageba (Swiss company) =

Civil engineering company

mageba
- Company type: Private company
- Industry: Civil Engineering
- Founded: 1963
- Headquarters: Bulach, Switzerland
- Number of locations: More than 40 countries
- Key people: Martin E. Bachmann (CEO)
- Products: Structural Bearings, Expansion Joints, Shock Absorbers, Seismic Devices, Structural monitoring systems
- Services: Design, Inspections, Testing, Remote Monitoring, Installation, Refurbishment and Rebuilding
- Number of employees: 900+
- Divisions: mageba Switzerland, Australia, Austria, China, Czech Republic, Germany, Hungary, India, Latin America, Russia, Singapore, Slovakia, South Korea, Turkey, United Arab Emirates, USA
- Website: www.mageba-group.com

Mageba (stylised as mageba) is a civil engineering service provider and manufacturer of bridge bearings, expansion joints, seismic protection and structural monitoring devices for the construction industry. The company is headquartered in Bulach, Switzerland, and operates through offices in Europe, Americas and Asia Pacific. In all, mageba has official representations in over 40 countries.

== History ==
mageba was founded in 1963 in Bulach, Switzerland. By 1969 the company was designing and manufacturing a variety of bridge bearings and expansion joints, and had heavy duty testing facilities in operation. In 2004 the company merged with Proceq. The resulting company continued to design and manufacture bridge bearings and expansion joints.

In April 2011, mageba USA LLC was founded with offices in New York and San Jose. By then mageba had production facilities in Fussach (Austria), Shanghai (China), and offices in Uslar and Stuttgart (Germany) and Cugy (Switzerland). By 2012, the company had four facilities in India, and was also operating in Russia, South Korea, and Turkey.

mageba has supplied bearings and expansion joints to more than 10,000 bridges around the world, including the Audubon Bridge in Louisiana USA, Incheon Bridge in South Korea the Golden Ears Bridge in British Columbia, Canada(2009), the Bandra Worli Sea link in India, the Øresund Bridge which has linked Denmark and Sweden since 2000, and the Tsing Ma Bridge in Hong Kong.

mageba also installs and services bridge components.

A recent focus of activities of the firm has been the provision of structure surveillance services, including installation and remote monitoring of sensors, inspections and testing.
