= M5 (Copenhagen Metro) =

Planned metro line in Denmark

M5 is a planned line of the Copenhagen Metro that is set to open in 2 stages, the first in 2036, and the second in 2045. It will run from Copenhagen Central Station via Amagerbrogade to Refshaleøen and Lynetteholm. The line will encompass ten stations, of which five will be new. There will be a possibility of expanding the line with three more stations. The project has completed an environmental impact assessment and has received approval from the authorities.

== M5 ==
M5 logo

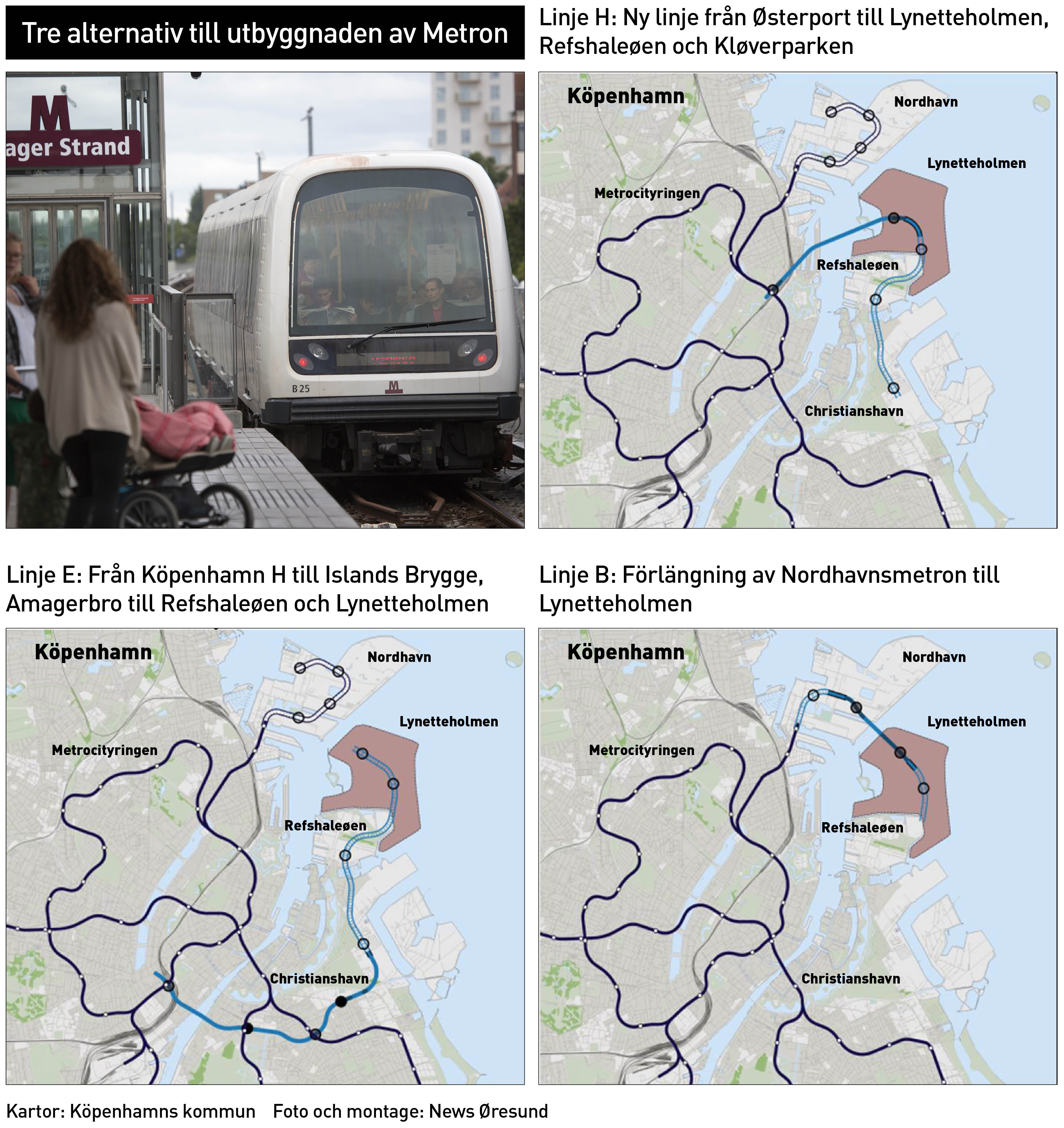

== Stations ==
=== Planned ===
- København H
- Bryggebroen (new)
- DR Byen
- Amagerbrogade Syd (new)
- Lergravsparken
- Prags Boulevard (new)
- Refshaleøen (new)
- Lynetteholm Syd (new)
- Lynetteholm Nord (new)
- Østerport

=== Possible expansions ===
- Rigshospitalet
- Stengade
- Forum

== Project timeline ==
- 1st quarter of 2023: Idea phase, hearing and political decisions. The current M5 (purple) line was chosen over the competing proposed (orange) line from Østerport to Refshaleøen and Lynetteholm. Decision to undertake an environmental impact assessment.
- 2023–2024: Environmental impact assessment is carried out and is rounded off with a hearing lasting 8 weeks that ended on September 26, 2024. The outcome was positive. The project received a green light from the authorities.
- 2025: Construction project proposals.
- 2026–2028: Tender and contract conclusion.
- 2028–2036: Laying down of the track and stations.
- 2036: M5 (phase 1) is expected to become operational.
- 2045: M5 (phase 2) is expected to become operational.
