= Peberholm =

Danish artificial island in the Øresund

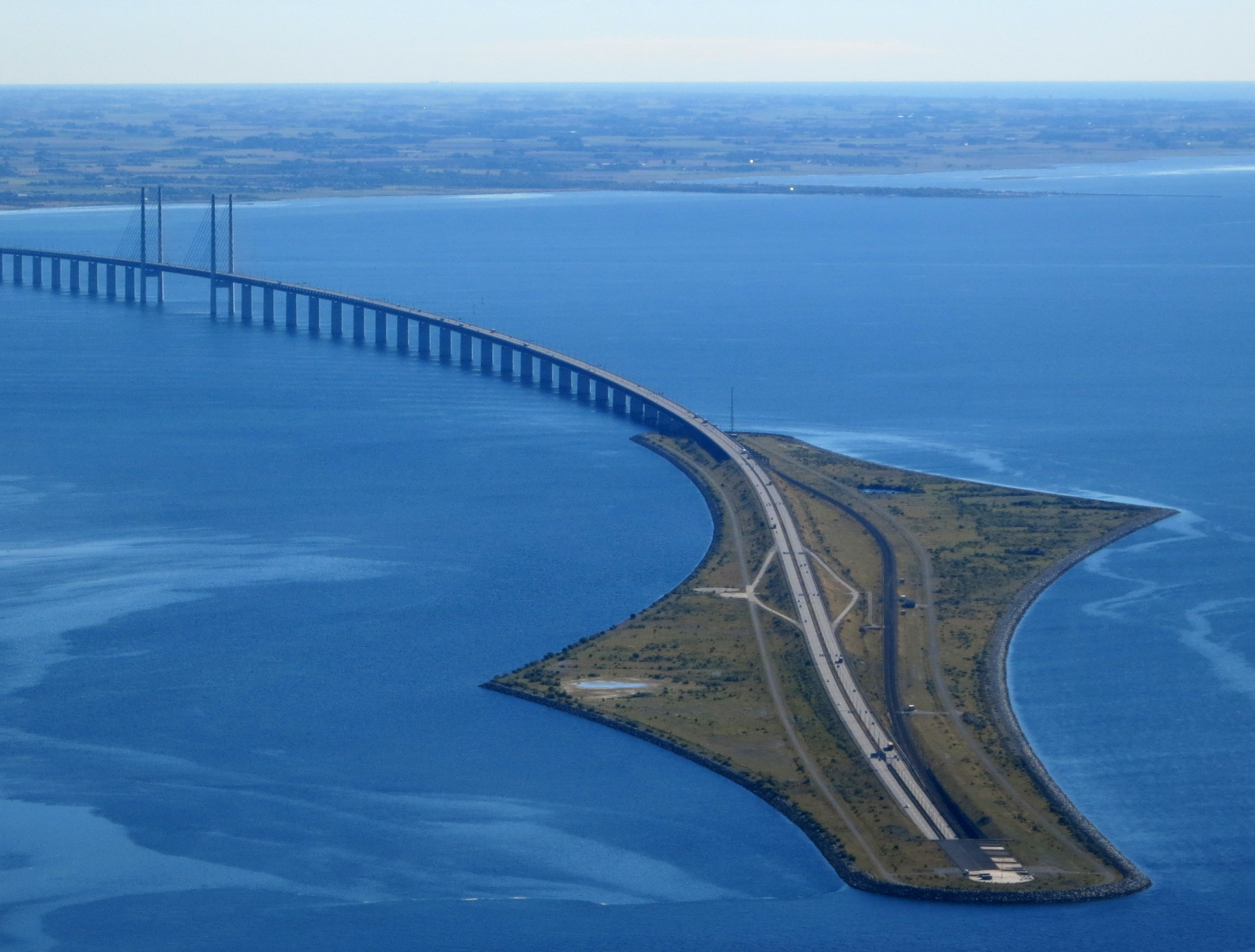
- View of Peberholm and the Øresund Bridge (from the north west)

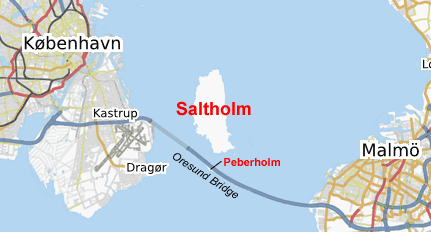
- Location of Peberholm, in the Øresund

Geography
- Location: Øresund, Baltic Sea
- Coordinates: 55°36′N 12°45′E
- Area: 1.3 km^{2} (0.50 sq mi)
- Highest point: unnamed

Administration
- Denmark
- Region: Hovedstaden
- Municipality: Tårnby

Demographics
- Population: 0 (2020)
- Pop. density: 0/km^{2} (0/sq mi)
- Ethnic groups: none

Peberholm (Danish pronunciation: [ˈpʰe̝wɐˌhʌlˀm] lit. 'Pepper Islet', Swedish: Pepparholm (Swedish pronunciation: [ˈpɛ̂pːarˌhɔlm])) is a small artificial island in the Danish part of the Øresund strait, created as part of the Øresund Bridge connecting Denmark with Sweden. Peberholm lies approximately 1 km south of the larger natural island of Saltholm (Salt Islet) and was named to complement it. It has an area of 1.3 km^{2} (320 acres) and belongs to Denmark.

== Reasons for construction ==
The reason for constructing the island was to have a crossover point between the tunnel and the bridge.

The tunnel was built since a bridge spanning the entire link between Malmö and Copenhagen would have interfered with obstacle-free zones around Kastrup Airport. Another reason was to enable large ships to pass the Öresund without worrying about the height of the bridge. Making the Øresund Bridge higher would have interfered with the freight train traffic because a steeper gradient would be needed.

The border between Swedish and Danish railway signalling and railway traffic control is on Peberholm.

There is an exit from the motorway on the island, banned from unauthorised traffic, and a helicopter pad mainly planned for usage at traffic accidents (55°36′03″N 12°45′05″E).

== Construction ==
The original designs for a bridge across the Øresund required extensive use of Saltholm as a stepping-stone for the bridge. They required either the construction of both a motorway and railway across Saltholm or an expansion of the existing island to serve the same purpose.

Both of these options were ultimately abandoned in order to protect the island's ecology; Danish and Swedish politicians decided instead to construct an artificial island immediately south of Saltholm to achieve that goal. The location was chosen in the belief that it would ensure the freest flow of water through the strait, a key element in the debate about whether or not the bridge should be constructed.

Peberholm is protected by strict laws. Only biologists are allowed one annual visit to the areas of the island outside of the railroad and highway to which the island owes its creation. The island is part of Natura 2000 area 142, comprising Saltholm and surrounding waters with a total area of 7,218 ha (17,840 acres). The same area is also under two birdprotections as habitats H110 and H126. The laws did not prevent it from being used as a border control station during the 2020 coronavirus pandemic.

=== Development ===
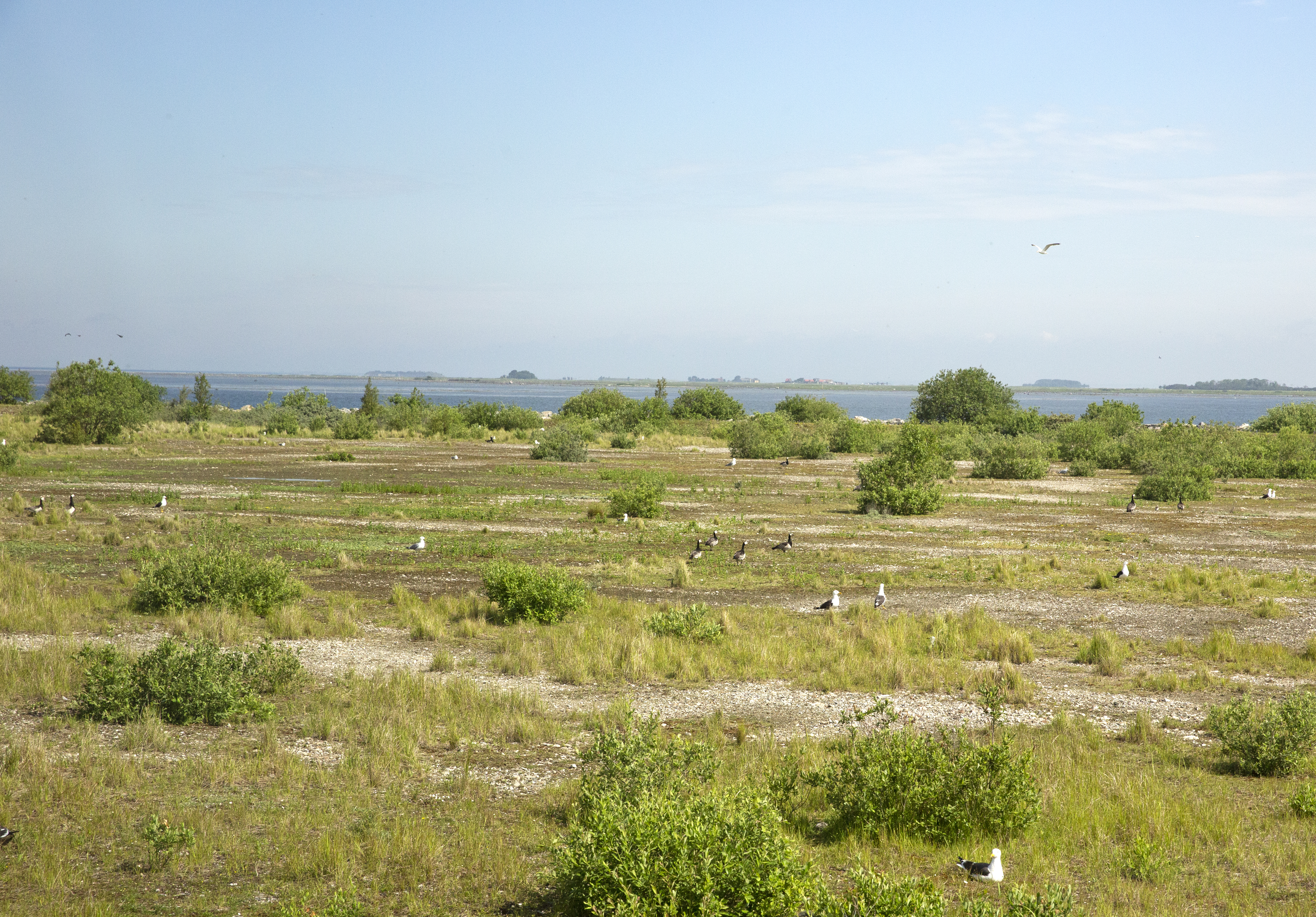
The artificial island of Peberholm, which is part of the Øresund Link, has a rich plant and animal life.

Peberholm is considered to be a biological experiment. Scientists predicted that nature would colonise it and make the island flourish on its own, without any human interaction whatsoever. As of June 2007, scientists from the Biological Society of Lund had registered 454 species of plants on the island. Also resident to the island as of 2005 were about 20 species of spiders, and approximately 12 species of birds.

Since 2008, both the quantity of birds and the number of bird species have seen an increase, and now between 20 and 30 species breed on Peberholm regularly. The island is largely inhabited by several kinds of breeding gulls, and some locally threatened species have also found a home there as breeders, including the Mediterranean gull and European rock pipit in some years. Many geese, ducks, great cormorants, and waders rest on the small island and the white-tailed eagle is often observed in winter. The European green toad, which is rare and protected in Denmark, was found living in several ditches. In 2007–08 a count found 2,500 individuals, which is among the largest populations in Scandinavia. It is assumed that toads from Saltholm have swum across. Three species of mice have also populated Peberholm, and since 2010, hares have crossed the ice and are breeding on Peberholm. It is important to keep these populations under surveillance, as mice can be dangerous to the stability of the rails. Since 2015, white rabbits have been seen on the island. They may have been pets that were released by a driver.

In the years 2004–08 surveys focused on insects registered a total of 345 beetle species, 421 species of butterflies, and 18 species of bees. This is considered a relatively low diversity compared to similar habitats in Denmark and Sweden, however some of these species are rare or threatened in the region. The population of butterflies seems peculiarly skewed towards regionally uncommon or rare species, including Epiblema grandaevana (a species of moth), and Bath white (Pontia daplidice). In 2005 the Hobo spider was discovered here, a spider that is only regionally known from a certain spot in Jutland. It is thought that it migrated here by trains from abroad. In 2006, the weevil species Ceutorhynchus resedae was also discovered, a unique find in Denmark.

== Sources ==
- "Oresund Bridge". Road Traffic Technology.
- Ohrt, Hans (February 2011). "Peberholm – an artificial gem of nature" (PDF). Vand og Jord (in Danish). No. 1. pp. 26–31. Archived from the original (PDF) on 6 August 2020.
- "Life on Peberholm". Øresundsbron.
- "142 Saltholm and surrounding sea" (in Danish). Danish Nature Agency. Archived from the original on 4 March 2016.
