= 2025 Glostrup municipal election =

Municipal election in Denmark

← 2021	18 November 2025	2029 →

All 19 seats to the Glostrup municipal council 10 seats needed for a majority
- Turnout: 12,091 (61.8%) ▲1.6%
	First party	Second party	Third party
	A	V	F
Party	Social Democrats	Venstre	Green Left
Last election	8 seats, 35.9%	5 seats, 24.5%	1 seat, 4.4%
Seats won	8	3	2
Seat change	0	▼2	▲1
Popular vote	4,263	1,712	1,029
Percentage	36.1%	14.5%	8.7%
Swing	▲0.2%	▼10.0%	▲4.4%
	Fourth party	Fifth party	Sixth party
	O	C	U
Party	Danish People's Party	Conservatives	Bylisten
Last election	0 seats, 3.8%	2 seats, 9.4%	2 seats, 7.8%
Seats won	1	1	1
Seat change	▲1	▼1	▼1
Popular vote	907	865	839
Percentage	7.7%	7.3%	7.1%
Swing	▲3.9%	▼2.1%	▼0.7%
	Seventh party	Eighth party	Ninth party
	Ø	I	B
Party	Red-Green Alliance	Liberal Alliance	Social Liberals
Last election	0 seats, 4.2%	0 seats, 1.0%	1 seat, 4.7%
Seats won	1	1	1
Seat change	▲1	▲1	0
Popular vote	674	559	518
Percentage	5.7%	4.7%	4.4%
Swing	▲1.5%	▲3.7%	▼0.3%
Mayor before election
Kasper Damsgaard
Social Democrats
Mayor after election
Kasper Damsgaard
Social Democrats

The 2025 Glostrup Municipal election was held on November 18, 2025, to elect the 19 members to sit in the regional council for the Glostrup Municipal council, in the period of 2026 to 2029. Kasper Damsgaard from the Social Democrats, would secure re-election.

== Background ==
Following the 2021 election, Kasper Damsgaard from Social Democrats became mayor for his first term. Damsgaard would run for a second term.

== Electoral system ==
For elections to Danish municipalities, a number varying from 9 to 31 are chosen to be elected to the municipal council. The seats are then allocated using the D'Hondt method and a closed list proportional representation. Glostrup Municipality had 19 seats in 2025.

== Electoral alliances ==
=== Electoral Alliance 1 ===
Party		Political alignment
A	Social Democrats	Centre-left
M	Moderates	Centre to Centre-right

=== Electoral Alliance 2 ===
Party		Political alignment
B	Social Liberals	Centre to Centre-left
F	Green Left	Centre-left to Left-wing
Ø	Red-Green Alliance	Left-wing to Far-Left
Å	The Alternative	Centre-left to Left-wing

=== Electoral Alliance 3 ===
Party		Political alignment
C	Conservatives	Centre-right
D	New Right	Far-right

=== Electoral Alliance 4 ===
Party		Political alignment
I	Liberal Alliance	Centre-right to Right-wing
O	Danish People's Party	Right-wing to Far-right
V	Venstre	Centre-right

=== Electoral Alliance 5 ===
Party		Political alignment
U	Bylisten	Local politics
Æ	Denmark Democrats	Right-wing to Far-right

== Results by polling station ==
Division	A	B	C	D	F	I	M	O	U	V	Æ	Ø	Å
Division	%	%	%	%	%	%	%	%	%	%	%	%	%
Nordvanghallen	35.4	5.2	9.8	0.1	9.1	5.3	1.1	5.7	4.6	17.6	1.7	4.2	0.2
Sognegården	33.9	4.4	8.0	0.3	9.2	3.8	1.6	7.0	6.6	17.6	2.3	4.5	0.6
Søndervanghallen	34.6	5.1	8.3	0.3	8.6	4.3	1.0	8.9	7.4	12.5	2.1	6.4	0.5
Vestervangskolen	40.7	3.9	3.8	0.5	9.3	2.9	0.8	10.9	7.2	7.0	2.7	9.9	0.3
Ejbyhallen	35.8	3.9	7.1	0.2	6.3	8.1	0.7	3.7	4.0	25.7	1.7	2.6	0.2
Hvissingehallen	35.8	3.6	6.9	0.1	8.8	5.4	1.0	7.6	10.9	12.7	2.2	4.8	0.2

== Results ==
Party		Votes	%	+/-	Seats	+/-
Glostrup Municipality
A	Social Democrats	4,263	36.07	+0.19	8	0
V	Venstre	1,712	14.49	-10.04	3	-2
F	Green Left	1,029	8.71	+4.35	2	+1
O	Danish People's Party	907	7.67	+3.89	1	+1
C	Conservatives	865	7.32	-2.10	1	-1
U	Bylisten	839	7.10	-0.72	1	-1
Ø	Red-Green Alliance	674	5.70	+1.53	1	+1
I	Liberal Alliance	559	4.73	+3.70	1	+1
B	Social Liberals	518	4.38	-0.34	1	0
Æ	Denmark Democrats	256	2.17	New	0	New
M	Moderates	125	1.06	New	0	New
Å	The Alternative	44	0.37	New	0	New
D	New Right	28	0.24	-2.22	0	0
Total		11,819	100	N/A	19	N/A
Invalid votes		64	0.33	-0.02		
Blank votes		208	1.06	+0.33		
Turnout		12,091	61.78	+1.60		
Source: valg.dk

== Opinion polls ==
Polling firm	Fieldwork date	Sample size	A	V	C	U	B	F	Ø	O	D	I	M	Æ	Å	Others	Lead
Epinion	4 Sep - 13 Oct 2025	418	37.3	12.0	3.5	–	3.3	11.8	6.0	11.9	–	6.1	1.2	5.8	0.3	0.9	25.3
2024 european parliament election	9 Jun 2024		19.0	12.9	8.8	–	6.1	16.4	7.3	9.2	–	6.9	5.6	5.1	2.7	–	2.6
2022 general election	1 Nov 2022		32.8	10.5	4.8	–	3.1	8.1	4.1	4.9	3.6	7.6	10.9	5.1	1.9	–	21.9
2021 regional election	16 Nov 2021		36.1	17.9	12.8	–	5.6	6.9	5.6	5.5	4.2	1.6	–	–	0.7	–	18.2
2021 municipal election	16 Nov 2021		35.9 (8)	24.5 (5)	9.4 (2)	7.8 (2)	4.7 (1)	4.4 (1)	4.2 (0)	3.8 (0)	2.5 (1)	1.0 (0)	–	–	–	–	11.4
