= Greater Copenhagen (disambiguation) =

Greater Copenhagen may refer to:

- Greater Copenhagen (Folketing constituency)
- Greater Copenhagen Authority
- Greater Copenhagen Region, the marketing name of the metropolitan region, spanning eastern Denmark and southern Sweden, that make up the Øresund Region
- Urban area of Copenhagen
- Copenhagen metropolitan area

== See also ==
- Greater Copenhagen Committee
