= Provinces of Denmark =

Statistical divisions

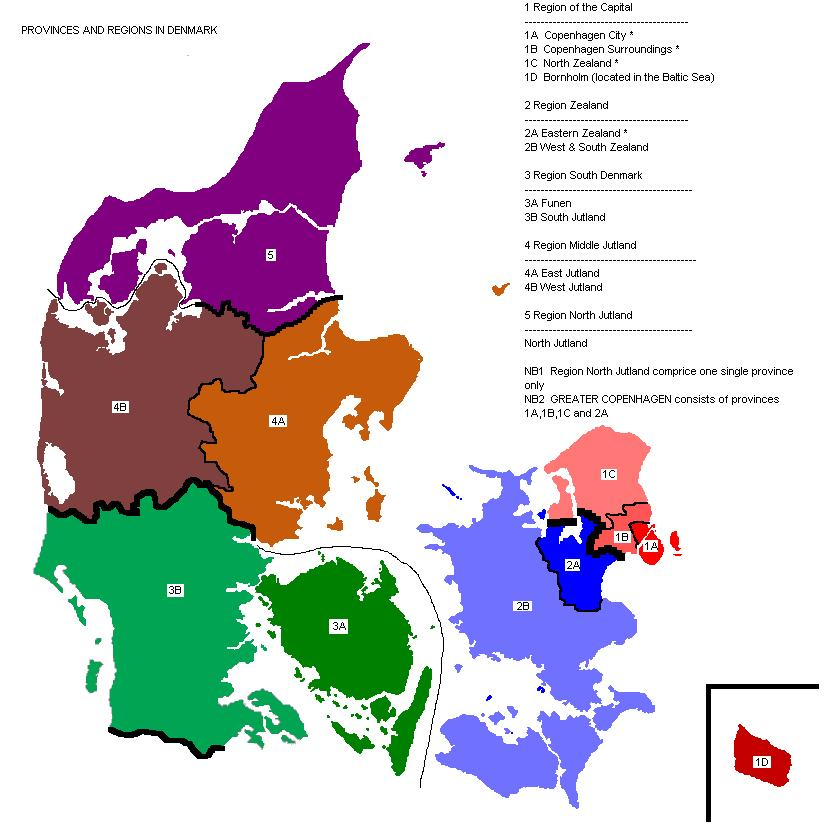
The 11 Danish Provinces, also the 5 Regions can be seen

The provinces of Denmark (Danish: Landsdele) are statistical divisions of Denmark, positioned between the administrative regions (Regioner) and municipalities (Kommuner). They are not administrative divisions, nor subject for any kind of political elections, but are mainly for statistical use. Provinces are only used for Metropolitan Denmark (thus excluding its Atlantic autonomous territories).

There are five regions (EU standard NUTS 2) and eleven provinces (EU standard NUTS 3). The provinces Copenhagen City and Copenhagen surroundings are largely build up areas, the same applies also for large parts of East Zealand and North Zealand.

== Provinces by region and municipalities ==
This is a list of the eleven Danish provinces and the regions they belong to.

NUTS-2		NUTS-3		
Code	Region	Code	Province	Municipalities within the provinces
DK01	Region Hovedstaden (Capital Region of Denmark)	DK011	Byen København (Copenhagen City)	Copenhagen, Frederiksberg, Dragør and Tårnby
DK01	Region Hovedstaden (Capital Region of Denmark)	DK012	Københavns omegn (Copenhagen surroundings)	Albertslund, Ballerup, Brøndby, Gentofte, Gladsaxe, Glostrup, Herlev, Hvidovre, Høje-Taastrup, Ishøj, Lyngby-Taarbæk, Rødovre and Vallensbæk
DK01	Region Hovedstaden (Capital Region of Denmark)	DK013	Nordsjælland (North Zealand)	Allerød, Egedal, Fredensborg, Frederikssund, Furesø, Gribskov, Halsnæs, Helsingør, Hillerød, Hørsholm and Rudersdal
DK01	Region Hovedstaden (Capital Region of Denmark)	DK014	Bornholm	Bornholm with Ertholmene
DK02	Region Sjælland (Region Zealand)	DK021	Østsjælland (East Zealand)	Greve, Køge, Lejre, Roskilde and Solrød
DK02	Region Sjælland (Region Zealand)	DK022	Vest- og Sydsjælland (West & South Zealand)	Faxe, Guldborgsund, Holbæk, Kalundborg, Lolland, Næstved, Odsherred, Ringsted, Slagelse, Sorø, Stevns and Vordingborg
DK03	Region Syddanmark (Region of Southern Denmark)	DK031	Fyn (Funen)	Assens, Faaborg, Kerteminde, Langeland, Middelfart, Nordfyn, Nyborg, Odense, Svendborg and Ærø
DK03	Region Syddanmark (Region of Southern Denmark)	DK032	Sydjylland (South Jutland)	Billund, Esbjerg, Fanø, Fredericia, Haderslev, Kolding, Sønderborg, Tønder, Varde, Vejen, Vejle and Aabenraa
DK04	Region Midtjylland (Central Denmark Region)	DK041	Vestjylland (West Jutland)	Herning, Holstebro, Ikast, Lemvig, Ringkøbing-Skjern, Skive, Struer and Viborg
DK04	Region Midtjylland (Central Denmark Region)	DK042	Østjylland (East Jutland)	Favrskov, Hedensted, Horsens, Norddjurs, Odder, Randers, Samsø, Silkeborg, Skanderborg, Syddjurs and Aarhus
DK05	Region Nordjylland (North Denmark Region)	DK050	Nordjylland (North Jutland)	Brønderslev, Frederikshavn, Hjørring, Jammerbugt, Læsø, Mariagerfjord, Morsø, Rebild, Thisted, Vesthimmerland and Aalborg

== Provinces by area and population ==
Areas and population within the provinces

Province	Population (2013)	Area km^{2}	Population density Hab./km^{2}
Copenhagen City (Note: Provinces forming Copenhagen metropolitan area, although the four NUTS 3 provinces belong to two different NUTS 2 regions, and the Baltic island, Bornholm is excluded.)	728,243	169.6	4,394
Copenhagen Surroundings	530,612	342.3	1,550
North Zealand	450,245	1,449.0	311
East Zealand	239,016	807.7	296
West & South Zealand	577,710	6,414.9	90
Bornholm	40,305	592.3	68
Funen	486,709	3,478.7	140
South Jutland	715,800	8,777.3	82
East Jutland	851,769	5,841.4	146
West Jutland	425,769	7,164.3	59
North Jutland	581,057	7,878.6	74

The provinces Copenhagen City, Copenhagen Surroundings, North Zealand and East Zealand together comprise the Copenhagen metropolitan area. They are together both the planning area for the Copenhagen area, also known as the Finger Plan and the Copenhagen Public transport area. Close to 2 million people live in their joint area of about 2,770 square kilometres. This is also the best area to use for comparisons with other cities of similar size.

Although East Zealand (NUTS-3 level) belongs to healthcare Region Zealand (NUTS-2 level), in other respects (like public transport, road maintenance, metropolitan future planning, known as the Finger Plan in all versions since 1949, regional radio and television etc.) it belongs to the Metropolitan Area of Greater Copenhagen. This has been the case since 1970, but at that time the East Zealand province was an administrational and political unit, called Roskilde Amt.

Occasionally the East Jutland province, with around 850,000 inhabitants in 5,841 square kilometres, is labeled as Greater Aarhus, however less than 40% of its population lives in Aarhus municipality.
