= Copenhagen Waterworks =

Heritage industrial complex in Copenhagen

Coordinates: 55.6768°N 12.5645°E

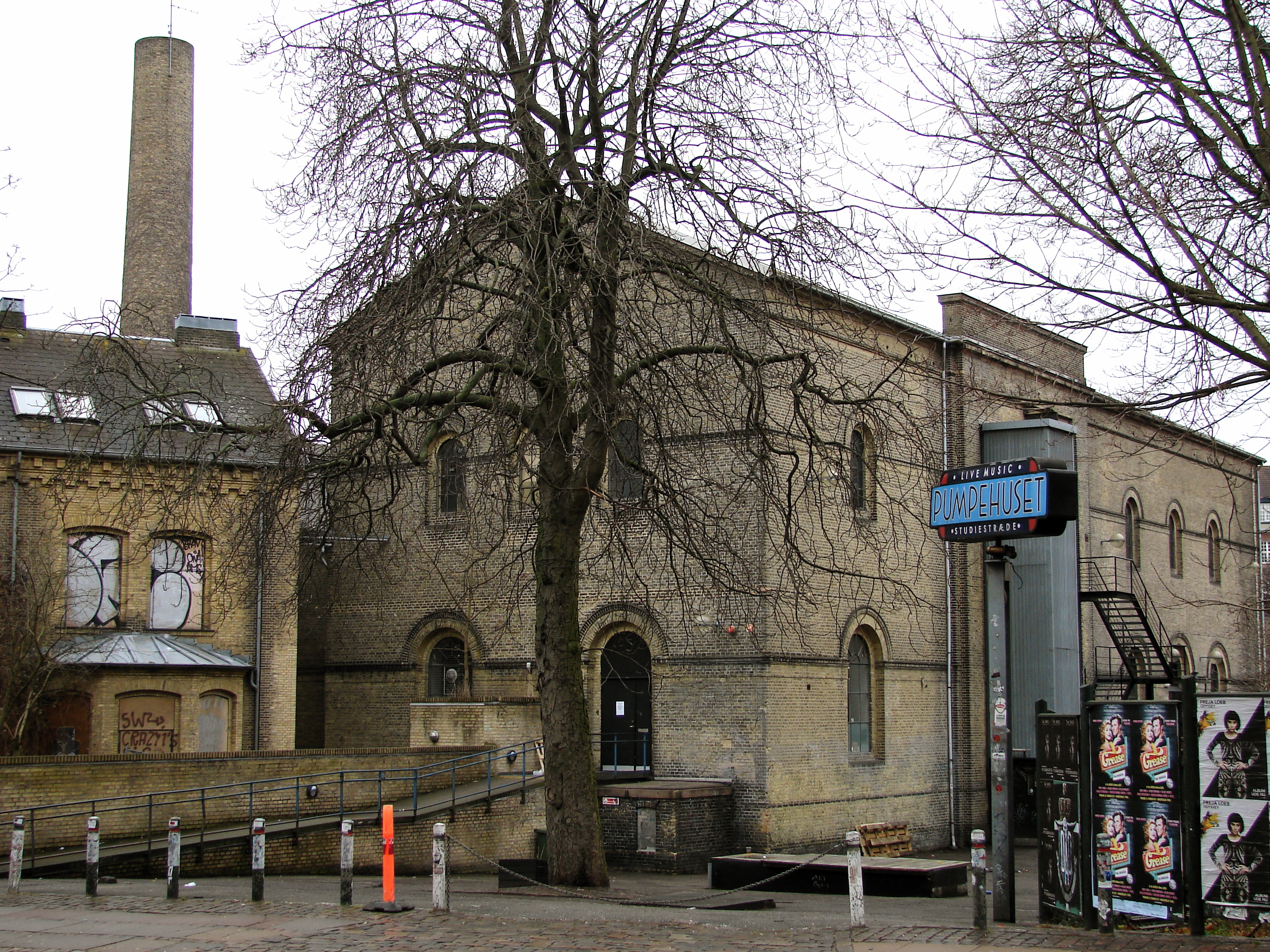
The buildings today

Copenhagen Waterworks (Danish: Københavns Vandværk), in Copenhagen, Denmark, was Denmark's first waterworks. Located in Studiestræde, between Axeltorv and H. C. Andersens Boulevard, it opened in 1859 and continued operations until 1951. The complex was designated an Industrial Heritage Site in 2007 and listed in 2010. The former engine house is now home to concert venue Pumpehuset. The other buildings house a daycare.

== History ==
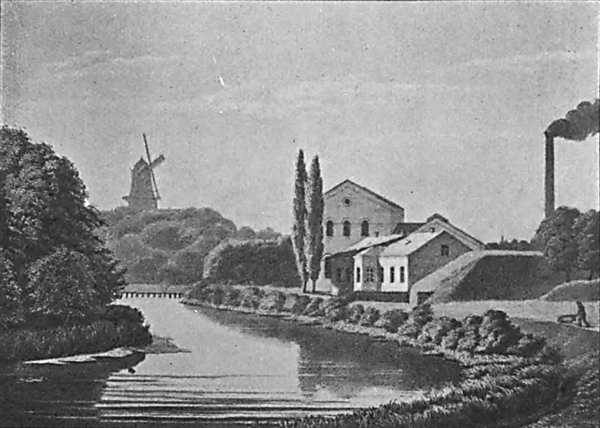
The waterworks seen from the north with Lucie Mill in the background.

Until the second half of the 19th century, Copenhagen's water supply was based on surface water from Damhus Lake. A dam on Harrestrup Å at Roskilde Road made it possible to lead water through Grøndalsåen and Ladegårdsåen to Sortedam and Peblinge Lakes.

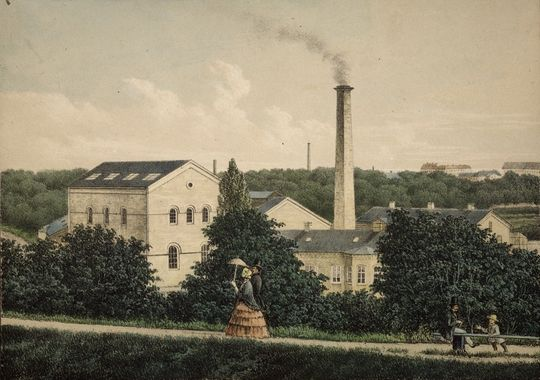
The waterworks as seen from the West Rampart shortly after its completion in 1859

Copenhagen Waterworks was one of the first buildings to be built outside Copenhagen's old city walls. The arrangement of the individual buildings, which appears random today, resulted from construction on a former ravelin. A commission was set up in 1847 to investigate possible improvements of Copenhagen's water supply but it took the 1853 Copenhagen cholera outbreak to make the politicians take action. The British company Cochrane & Co. was charged with the design and construction and overall design of the system while the architect Niels Sigfred Nebelong designed the individual buildings. Cochrane & Co. had previously also constructed of the city's first gasworks. Carlsberg founder J. C. Jacobsen laid the foundation stone on 16 May 1857 and the waterworks was inaugurated on 9 August 1859.

The new pumping station contained three large steam engines which drove the pumps. They produced a combined capacity of 300 hp. It extracted water from the lakes around Copenhagen as well as ground water and used an elevation reservoir in Søndermarken. The capacity was increased in 1875 and 1889. The waterworks ceased operations in 1951.

== Architecture ==
The original buildings are all built in yellow brick with arched windows and have slate roofs. The pumping station is located in the centre of the site and consists of a two-storey machine house and a one-storey boiler house that are attached to each other as well as a small coal house on the south side of the boiler house. The chimney is from 1929. It was originally 43 m (141 ft) high but it was shortened by 10 m (33 ft) for security reasons.

The other buildings are residences for the inspector and technical employees, a half-timbered gatehouse (1887, Ludvig Fenger) and three administration buildings, the youngest of which is from 1951.

== Today ==
The music venue Pumpehuset has used the central pumping station since 1987. The other buildings are under transformation into a kindergarten.
