= 2021 Glostrup municipal election =

Danish municipal election

- 16 November 2021

All 19 seats to the Glostrup Municipal Council 10 seats needed for a majority
- Turnout: 11,148 (60.2%) ▼4.6pp
	First party	Second party	Third party
	A	V	C
Party	Social Democrats	Venstre	Conservatives
Last election	7 seats, 35.5%	7 seats, 30.3%	1 seat, 3.8%
Seats won	8	5	2
Seat change	▲1	▼2	▲1
Popular vote	3,921	2,680	1,029
Percentage	35.9%	24.5%	9.4%
Swing	▲0.4%	▼5.8%	▲5.6%
	Fourth party	Fifth party	Sixth party
	U	B	F
Party	Bylisten	Social Liberals	Green Left
Last election	Did Not Stand	0 seats, 2.9%	1 seat, 5.7%
Seats won	2	1	1
Seat change	▲2	▲1	0
Popular vote	854	516	476
Percentage	7.8%	4.7%	4.4%
Swing	New	▲1.8%	▼1.3%
	Seventh party	Eighth party
	Ø	O
Party	Red–Green Alliance	Danish People's Party
Last election	1 seat, 5.3%	2 seats, 12.2%
Seats won	0	0
Seat change	▼1	▼2
Popular vote	456	413
Percentage	4.2%	3.8%
Swing	▼1.1%	▼8.4%
Mayor before election
John Engelhardt
Venstre
Mayor after election
Kasper Damsgaard
Social Democrats

Venstre had held the mayor's position in Glostrup Municipality since 2010.

In the 2017 election, Venstre won 7 seats, and John Engelhardt would become mayor for his third term.

Despite this, Mandag Morgen, a newspaper, expected the Social Democrats would take over the mayor's position following this election. One of the reasons they said for this was that 4 parties outside Venstre had agreed on a financial settlement for 2022 in the period up to the election. Apart from this, John Engelhardt had also announced in November 2020 that he would not stand for a fourth term.

In the election result, the Social Democrats would become the largest party with 8 seats, followed by Venstre who lost 2 seats and ended on 5. An agreement with the Social Liberals, the Conservatives and the Green Left was eventually reached by the Social Democrats, and this would see Kasper Damsgaard become the first mayor from the Social Democrats since 2009.

== Electoral system ==
For elections to Danish municipalities, a number varying from 9 to 31 are chosen to be elected to the municipal council. The seats are then allocated using the D'Hondt method and a closed list proportional representation. Glostrup Municipality had 19 seats in 2021

Unlike in Danish General Elections, in elections to municipal councils, electoral alliances are allowed.

== Electoral alliances ==
=== Electoral Alliance 1 ===
Party		Political alignment
B	Social Liberals	Centre to Centre-left
F	Green Left	Centre-left to Left-wing
Ø	Red–Green Alliance	Left-wing to Far-Left

=== Electoral Alliance 2 ===
Party		Political alignment
C	Conservatives	Centre-right
D	New Right	Right-wing to Far-right

=== Electoral Alliance 3 ===
Party		Political alignment
L	Glostrup Borgerliste	Local politics
V	Venstre	Centre-right

=== Electoral Alliance 4 ===
Party		Political alignment
I	Liberal Alliance	Centre-right to Right-wing
O	Danish People's Party	Right-wing to Far-right
U	Bylisten	Local politics

== Results by polling station ==
L = Glostrup Borgerliste
U = Bylisten

Division	A	B	C	D	F	I	L	O	U	V	Ø
Division	%	%	%	%	%	%	%	%	%	%	%
Glostrup Skole, Nordvang	33.2	6.0	12.3	1.9	4.5	1.6	2.3	2.8	5.6	26.6	3.2
Aktivitetscentret Sydvestvej	28.6	5.4	8.7	2.0	5.9	0.6	1.1	3.7	11.4	28.6	3.9
Søndervanghallen	35.7	4.6	9.6	3.1	4.1	1.0	1.5	4.1	8.9	23.0	4.6
Glostrup Skole, Vestervang	48.6	4.8	5.5	2.7	4.1	0.5	3.4	5.1	6.5	13.5	5.3
Ejbyhallen	26.7	3.7	11.2	1.3	2.4	1.3	0.9	3.7	7.1	38.5	3.2
Hvissingehallen	37.4	3.7	9.9	2.9	4.6	1.2	1.5	3.2	7.3	24.1	4.2

== Results ==
Party		Votes	%	+/-	Seats	+/-
Glostrup Municipality
A	Social Democrats	3,921	35.88	+0.37	8	+1
V	Venstre	2,680	24.53	-5.77	5	-2
C	Conservatives	1,029	9.42	+5.65	2	+1
U	Bylisten	854	7.82	New	2	New
B	Social Liberals	516	4.72	+1.80	1	+1
F	Green Left	476	4.36	-1.34	1	0
Ø	Red-Green Alliance	456	4.17	-1.12	0	-1
O	Danish People's Party	413	3.78	-8.46	0	-2
D	New Right	269	2.46	+1.06	0	0
L	Glostrup Borgerliste	201	1.84	New	0	New
I	Liberal Alliance	112	1.02	+0.27	0	0
Total		10,927	100	N/A	19	N/A
Invalid votes		65	0.35	+0.09		
Blank votes		156	0.84	+0.25		
Turnout		11,148	60.18	-4.63		
Source: valg.dk
