= Vestskoven =

Forest in Denmark

Coordinates: 55.6944°N 12.3722°E

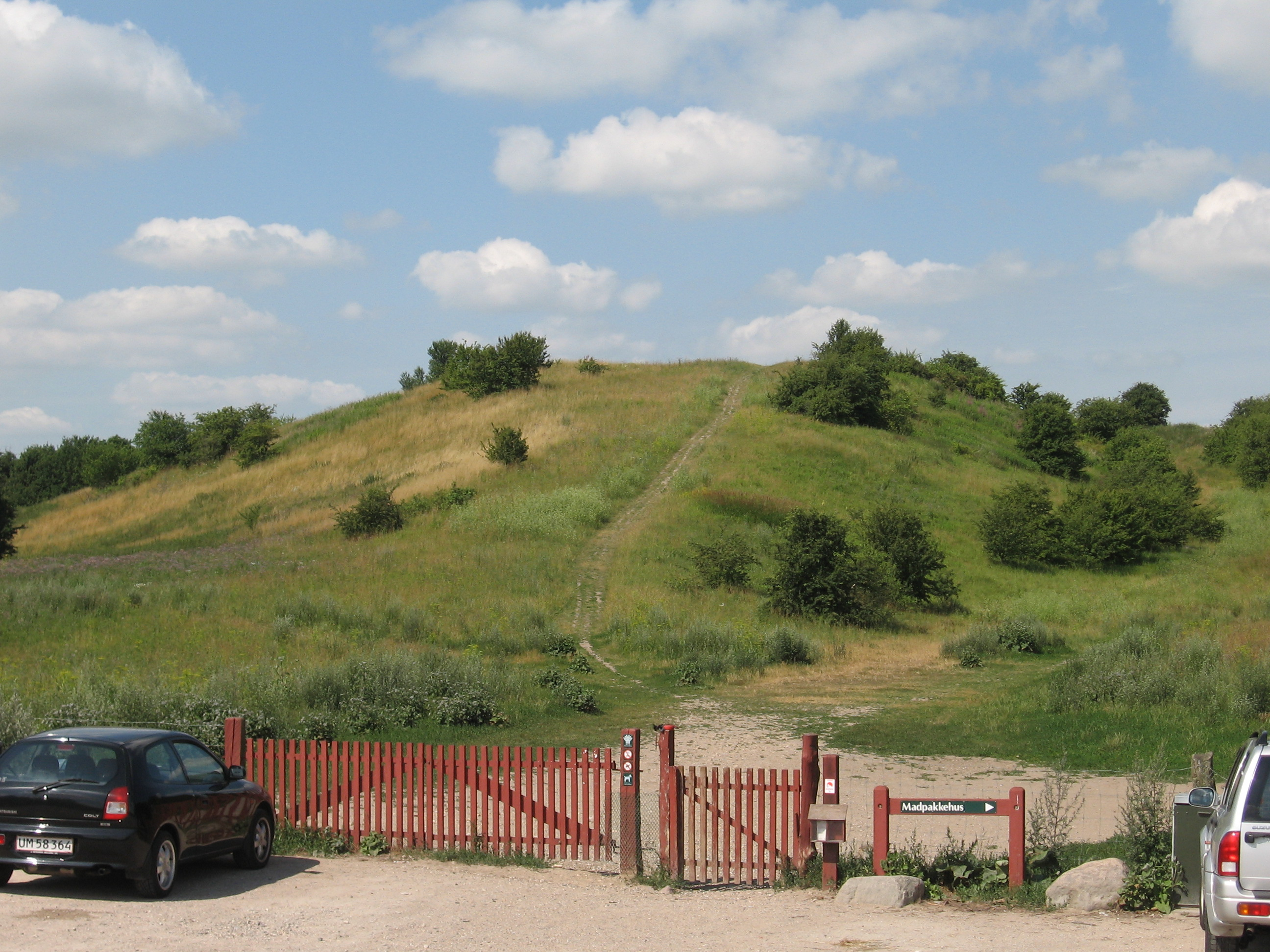
- Oxbjerget
- Interactive map of Vestskoven

Geography
- Location: Albertslund and Glostrup, Denmark
- Area: 13 km^{2} (5.0 sq mi)

Ecology
- Lesser flora: beech, European larch, oak, etc.
- Fauna: deers

Vestskoven (lit. "The West Forest") is a 13 km^{2} forest located in the western suburbs of Copenhagen, Denmark.

== History ==
Vestskoven was established in the late 1960s to provide easy access to recreational areas for the rapidly growing population of Copenhagen's western suburbs in accordance with the Finger Plan. The area was landscaped with artificial hills and lakes. The first trees were planted in 1967.

== Topography ==
Herstedhøje is a group of artificial hills located just north of Herstedøster in Albertslund Municipality. It rises to 67 metres or 30–35 metres above the surrounding countryside. Oxbjerget is an artificial hill situated just north of Hvissinge in Glostrup Municipality in the easternmost part of Vestskoven. Its highest point is 35 metres and it rises approximately 15 metres above the surrounding terrain. It is located in a fenced part of the forest where unleashed dogs are permitted.

Store Vejleådal in the westernmost part of Vestskoven is grazed by cattle. Vestskoven contains two boglands. Harrestrup Mose is located on the north side of the forest. Harrestrup Å originates in the area. The other bog is Porsemosen in the western part of the forest.

== Landmarks ==
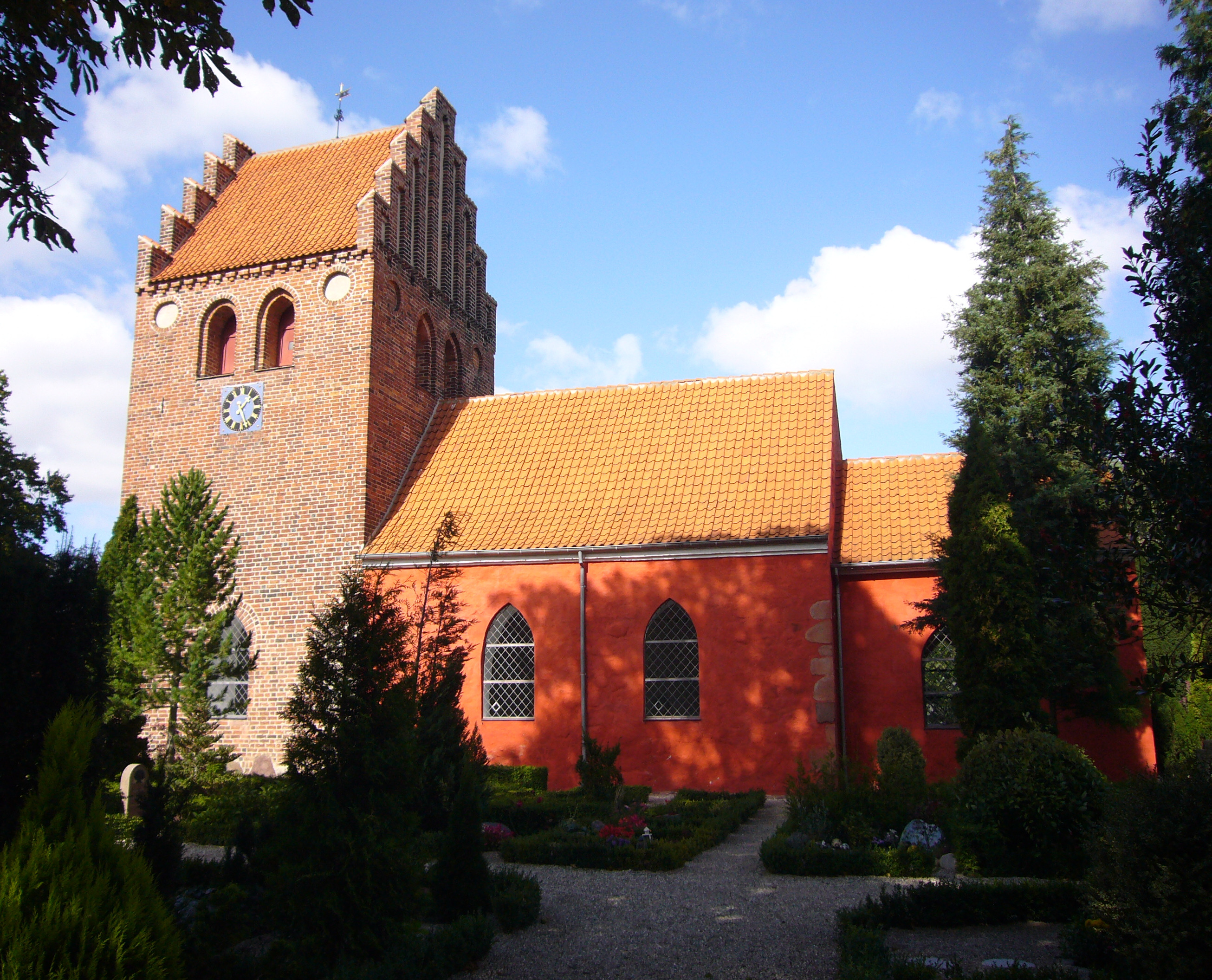
Herstedøster Church

=== Herstedøster and Risby ===
Vestskoven contains the two villages Herstedøster and Risby. Herstedøster Church dates from the 12th century although its Late Gothic was not built until the 15th century. Risby is most known for its film studios.

=== Kroppedal and Observatorium Tusculanum ===
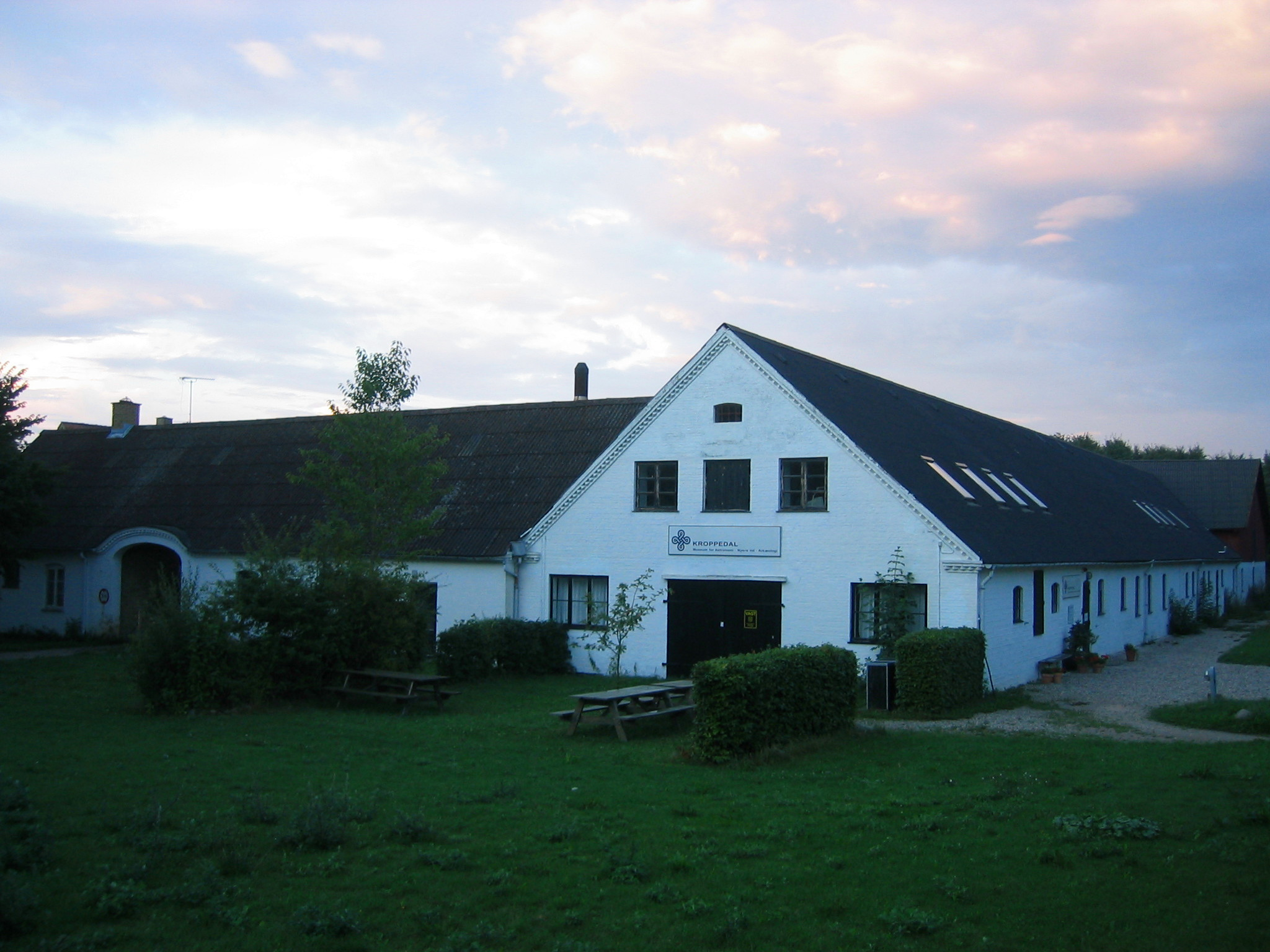
Kroppedal

Kroppedal at Vridsløsemagle in the western part of Vestskoven was converted into a local historic museum by Albertslund Municipality in 2002. It contains a permanent exhibition about Ole Rømer and special exhibitions about astronomy and local history. Rømer had operated an astronomic observatory nearby. It was called Observatorium Tusculanum but has been demolished and little remains today. A bronze statue by Ludvig Brandstrup now stands at the site. It was originally located in Copenhagen.

=== Viking village ===
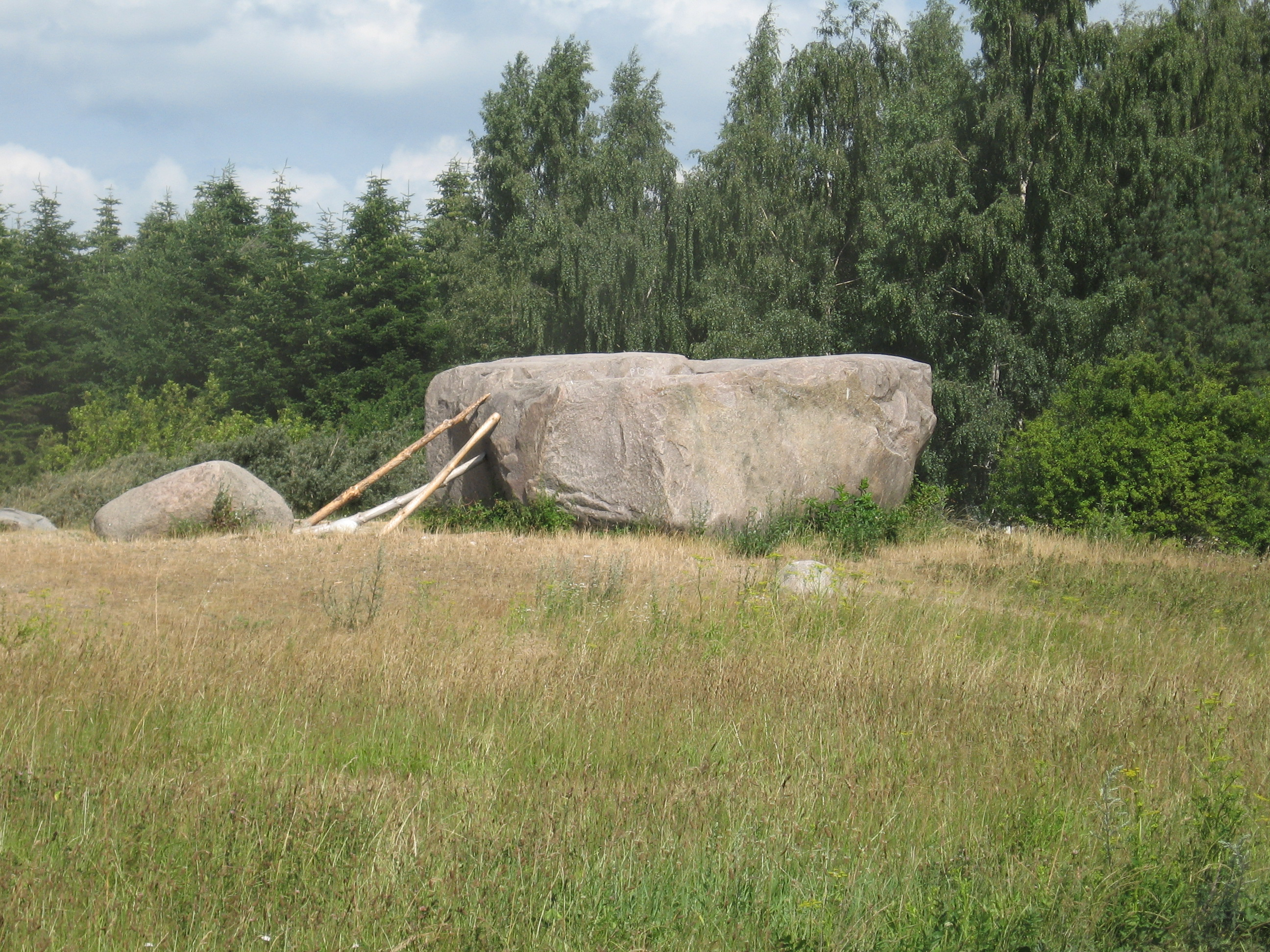
The Hvissinge Stone

A reconstruction of a Viking village is located at Store Vejleådal in the western part of Vestskoven. It consists of a communal building, a few houses and a pigs' stable. A reconstruction of a Viking road and bridge across Store Vejleådal is planned.

=== Hvissinge Stone ===
The Hvissinge Stone, a Glacial erratic, is the largest stone on the island of Zealand. It measures 5×6×3.5 m and weighs 250,000 kilos.
