= Harrestrup Å =

Harrestrup Stream
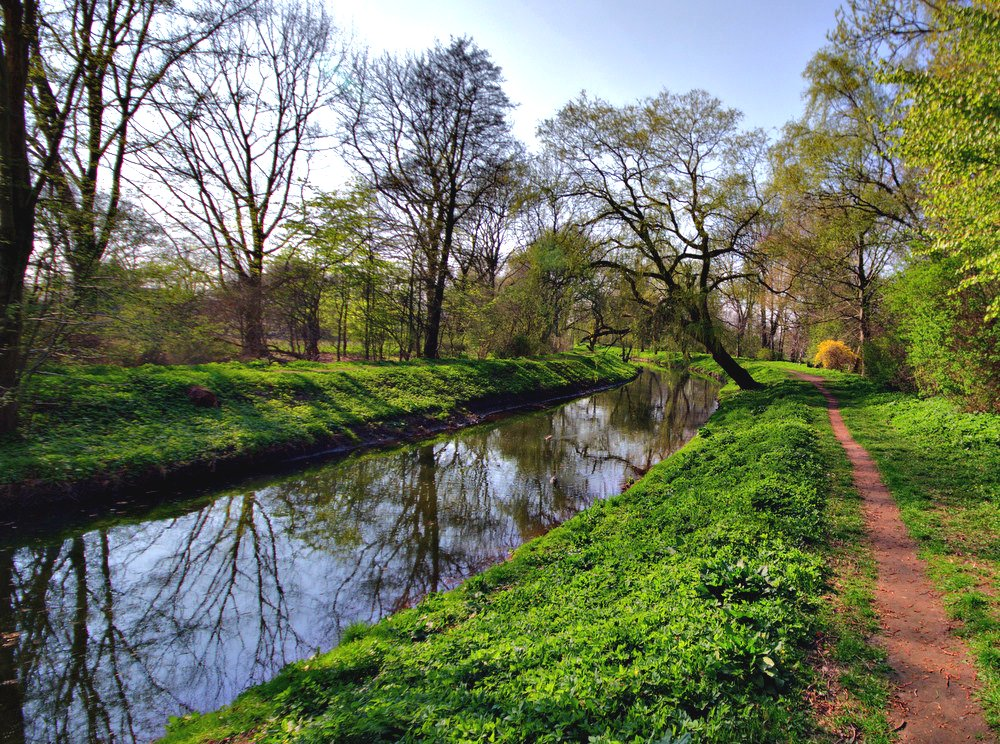
- Harrestrup Å in Vigerslev Park
- Native name: Harrestrup Å (Danish)

Location
- Country: Denmark
- Region: Zealand
- District: Region Zealand
- City: Copenhagen

Physical characteristics
- Mouth: Valby Park
  - location: Kalveboderne
  - coordinates: 55°38′09″N 12°30′24″E
  - elevation: 0 m (0 ft)
- Length: 20 km (12 mi)

Basin features
- Tributaries
  - left: Sømose Å Kagsmose Å

Harrestrup Å is an approximately 20 km long stream through the western suburbs of Copenhagen, Denmark. It rises at Harrestrup Mose in Vestskoven woodland on the border between Albertslund, Ballerup and Rødovre and flows through Damhus Lake and several parks on its way to the Øresund at Kalvebod Beach in Valby Park.

== Course ==
The stream rises at Mønterne/Herstedhøje just south of Harrestrup Mose and this first, short section is called Rogrøften. Harrestrup Mose is also fed by Ballerup-Skovlunde Skolerende from the north and Bymoserenden from the south.

Harrestrup Å then flows east and is joined by Sømose Å from the north before passing under the Vestvolden on its way to the Kagsmose bog which is also fed by Kagsmose Å from the north.

From Kagsmosen, Harrestrup Å continues south through Krogebjergparken and the Damhus Meadow to the Damhus Lake.

The section from Damhus Lake to the sea is also called Damhusåen. It runs through first the Vigerslev Park and then the Valby Park and follows the boundary between Copenhagen and Hvidovre municipalities.

== Natural restoration ==
In 2013, it was decided to invest DKK 450 mio. in restoring the natural environment in the stream. The project is a collaboration between nine municipalities and the HOFOR utility company.
