= Sømosen =

Bog in Denmark

- IUCN category IV (habitat/species management area)
- Location within Denmark
- Location: Zealand
- Coordinates: 55°43′58.08″N 12°24′18.79″E
- Area: 23 ha (57 acres)
- Established: 1951
- Governing body: Conservation Board of Copenhagen

Sømosen is a bog straddling the border between Ballerup (95%) and Herlev (5%) municipalities in the northwestern suburbs of Copenhagen, Denmark. It formed some time between 8,000 and 13,000 BC. The water from the bog drains into Harrestrup Å to the south through Sømose Å. It was protected in 1951. The protected area was increased from 20 to 23 hectares in 2006.

== Location ==
Sømosen is located between Frederikssundsvej to the south, Klausdalbrovej to the north, Lautrupparken to the west and Grønsvinget to the east

== Description ==
About one third of the area consists of parkland. The remaining two thirds consists of open water with several small islands and reed forest to the north.
