= Vestegnen =

- Greater Copenhagen
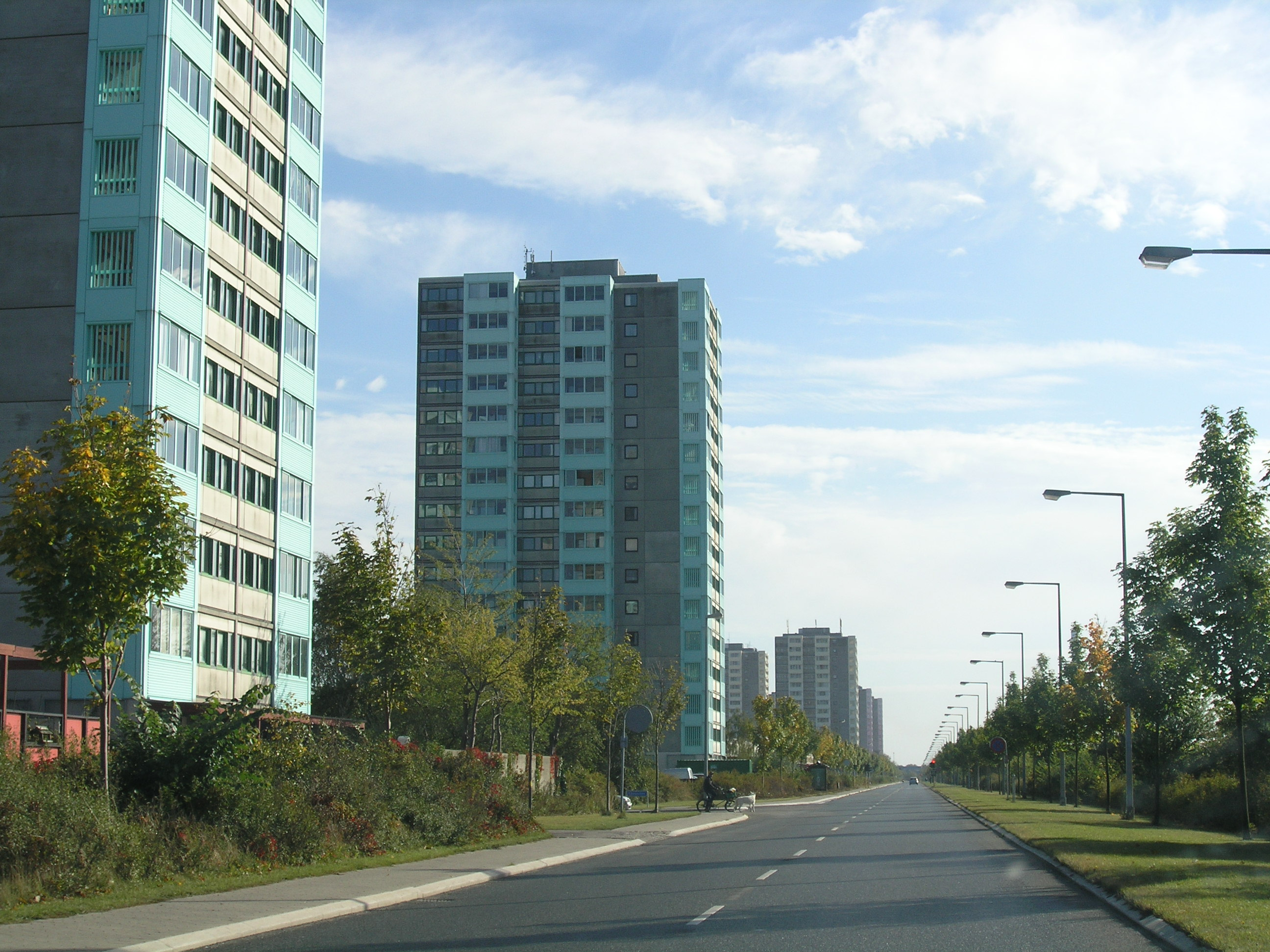
- High-rises of Brøndby Strand (2005)
- Interactive map of Vestegnen
- Coordinates: 55°39′02″N 12°24′46″E
- Country: Denmark
- Region: Hovedstaden

Area
  - Total: 206.1 km^{2} (79.6 sq mi)

Population (2018)
  - Total: 229,090
  - Density: 1,112/km^{2} (2,879/sq mi)

Ethnicity
  - Danish: 73.3%
  - Non-Danish: 26.7%

Vestegnen is a term for a part of the former Copenhagen County, located west of Copenhagen. The area is defined as consisting of the municipalities of Rødovre, Hvidovre, Glostrup, Brøndby, Albertslund, Køge, Vallensbæk, Ishøj and Høje-Taastrup and covers the area around some of the stations of the S-train, which are on the lines towards Høje Taastrup and Køge, and which are within the former Copenhagen County. The urban area of Hundige is often included due to its proximity to the rest of “Vestegnen” and the former terminus on the Køge Bugt-banen, but Hundige is located in Greve Municipality and thus neither in the former Copenhagen County nor the current Capital Region of Denmark.

Common to the mentioned municipalities – except Vallensbæk Municipality – is that they have for long periods been led by mayors of Socialdemokratiet – in several cases with an absolute majority in the municipal council.

The municipalities covered by the former Vestegnssamarbejde (Rødovre, Hvidovre, Glostrup, Brøndby, Albertslund, Vallensbæk, Ishøj and Høje-Taastrup) has a total population of 229,090 people, of which approximately 26.7% have an ethnic background other than Danish, as per 2018. This is more than twice as high as the national average of 13%. In Brøndby Strand, the number of people with other ethnic background than Danish was the highest, with 51%. Around 108,000 of the inhabitants are part of the labour force, but in the area there are around 136,000 jobs.

Vestegnen also has a common history that is reminiscent of, or coincides with, Hedeboegnen – the area bounded by Køge Å in the south and Værebro Å in the north. Just as agriculture came to the area early, it disappeared late, and the villages remained as the primary settlement until World War II. Thereafter, the area was expanded rapidly to accommodate the growing and increasingly affluent population in the Capital Region of Denmark. Vestegnen is therefore characterised by very little forested area, except for Vestskoven, which was artificially created in 1967, and large areas with modern housing in which many of the old villages still exist. Since the area was agricultural land right up until World War II, there is not much old industry either – most industrial districts are from the 1960s, 70s or 80s.
