= Finger Plan =

1947 urban plan for Copenhagen, Denmark

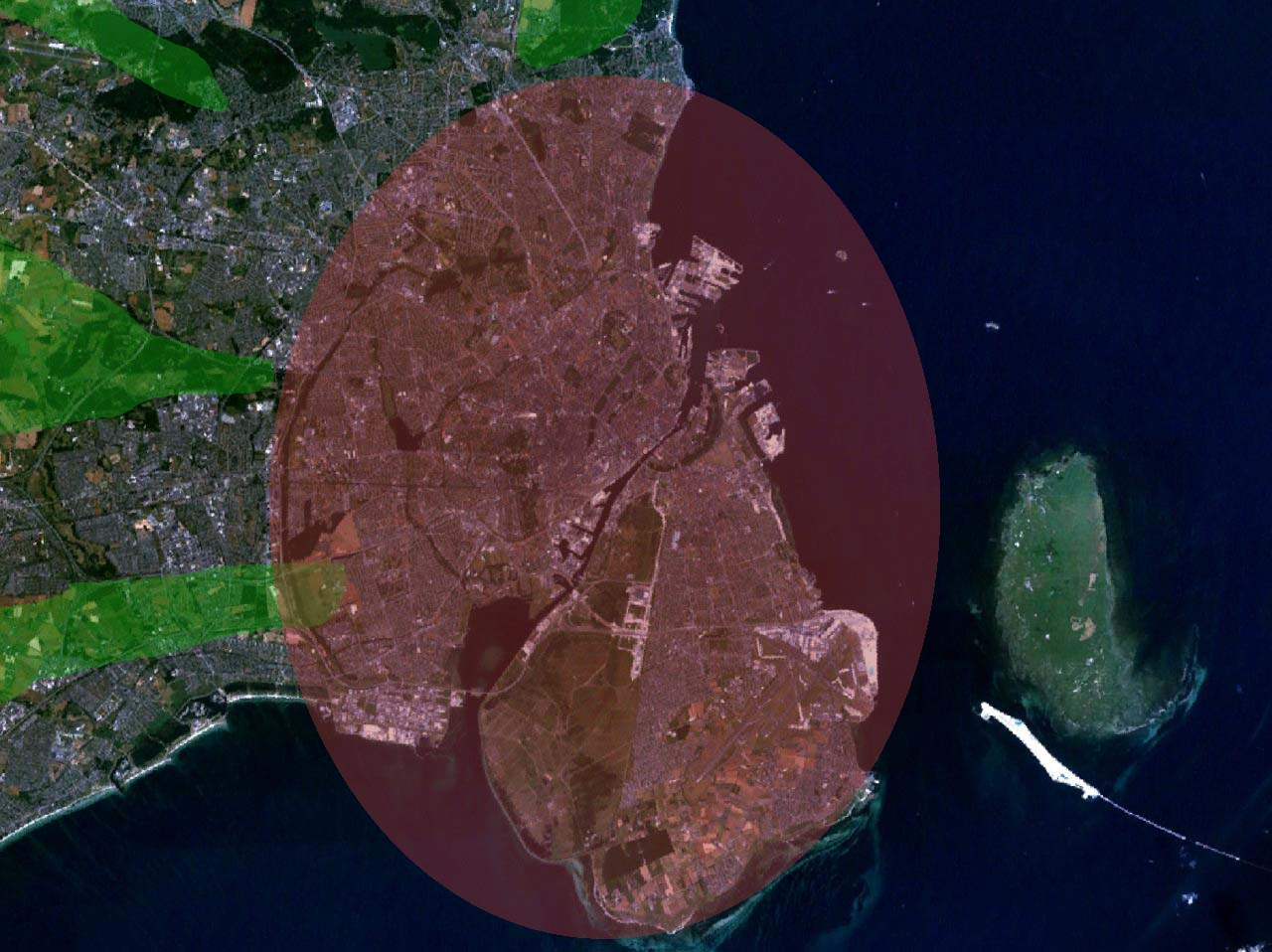
An aerial image showing the metropolitan area of Copenhagen, following the Finger Plan

The Finger Plan (Danish: Fingerplanen) is an urban plan from 1947 which provides a strategy for the development of the Copenhagen metropolitan area, Denmark. According to the plan, Copenhagen is to develop along five 'fingers', centred on S-train commuter rail lines, which extend from the 'palm', that is the dense urban fabric of central Copenhagen. In between the fingers, green "wedges" are intended to provide land for agriculture and recreational purposes.

By the definition in the Finger Plan the metropolitan area has a population of 2,036,717 (as of 1 January 2017) and an area of 3,030 km^{2} (1,170 sq mi) over 34 municipalities.

== Implementation ==
=== The little finger ===
The northern suburbs form the little finger of the plan and are traditionally the wealthiest. In popular language, the area is known as "The Whiskey Belt", although the area is mixed between mansions, larger houses, garden cities and mid-size houses. The area has a population of around 270,000 inhabitants.

- Gentofte Municipality: Klampenborg, Skovshoved, Charlottenlund, Hellerup, Gentofte, Ordrup, Jægersborg, Dyssegård, Vangede
- Lyngby-Taarbæk Municipality: Kongens Lyngby, Ulrikkenborg, Brede, Virum, Sorgenfri, Lundtofte, Hjortekær
- Rudersdal Municipality: Søllerød, Holte, Øverød, Gl. Holte, Trørød, Nærum, Vedbæk, Skodsborg, Birkerød, Kajerød, Bistrup
- Hørsholm Municipality: Hørsholm, Usserød, Rungsted, Vallerød, Smidstrup
- Allerød Municipality: Allerød, Lillerød, Blovstrød
- Fredensborg Municipality: Fredensborg, Asminderød, Humlebæk, Kokkedal, Niverød, Nivå.

=== The ring finger ===
The north-northwestern part of the suburbs forms the ring finger. The area is to a large extent formed by detached middle-class dwellings, with some exceptions of housing projects or upper-class areas. The area has a population of around 100,000 inhabitants.

- Gladsaxe Municipality: Gladsaxe, Bagsværd, Buddinge, Høje-Gladsaxe, Mørkhøj, Søborg
- Furesø Municipality: Værløse, Farum, Hareskovby

=== The middle finger ===
The northwestern suburbs form the middle finger. It consists of a mixed area of both detached middle-class dwellings, widespread garden cities and large, low-rise public housing projects. The area has a considerable part of the industrial areas of metropolitan Copenhagen, mostly in the traditional sectors of manufacturing. The area has a population of around 110,000 inhabitants.

- Herlev Municipality: Herlev, Hjortespring
- Ballerup Municipality: Skovlunde, Ballerup, Måløv, Ågerup, Jonstrup, Egebjerg
- Egedal Municipality: Smørumnedre, Stenløse, Ølstykke

=== The index finger ===
The index finger forms the western suburbs, which are those with the lowest income per capita and the highest crime rate. The suburbs vary from the petit bourgeois area of Glostrup to the widespread low housing projects of Albertslund and Taastrup. Of the total of 145,000 inhabitants, some 20% are immigrants of first or second generation.

- Rødovre Municipality: Rødovre, Islev
- Glostrup Municipality: Glostrup, Hvissinge, Ejby
- Brøndby Municipality: Brøndbyøster, Brøndbyvester, Brøndby Nord
- Albertslund Municipality
- Høje-Taastrup Municipality: Taastrup, Høje-Taastrup, Tåstrupgård, Hedehusene

=== The thumb ===
The southwest suburbs, also called Vestegnen, along the coast form the thumb of the plan. While the central parts of these suburbs are dominated by high-rise housing projects and low-income inhabitants, the distant part is dominated by detached middle-class houses. These suburbs have a population of some 215,000 inhabitants, with a sizeable number of immigrants.

- Hvidovre Municipality: Avedøre, Friheden, Hvidovre
- Brøndby Municipality: Brøndby Strand
- Vallensbæk Municipality
- Ishøj Municipality
- Greve Municipality: Hundige, Karlslunde, Greve
- Solrød Municipality: Solrød, Jersie
- Køge municipality: Køge, Ølby

=== The extra finger – contemporary planning in Copenhagen ===
When the finger plan was initially introduced, the island of Amager was not included as the infrastructure was inadequate for modern suburban life. It has since been improved and the suburbs on the island hold some 53,000 inhabitants. Amager is now one of the most modern suburbs of Copenhagen with increasing wealth. With the opening of the Øresund bridge to Sweden this finger has been extended all the way to Malmö.

- Tårnby Municipality: Tårnby, Kastrup
- Dragør Municipality
- Malmö Municipality

==== The sixth finger – background ====
The development of the Ørestad area (the sixth finger) was made by following, in some extent, the concepts of the original finger plan which had as its structure the regional rail system. This model is possible to be linked with the concept of transport oriented development (TOD), in which urban growth areas were developed along five radial corridors that connect Copenhagen inner city with new sub-urban settlements. These new urbanization rapidly attracted residents who came from Copenhagen city looking for more affordable housing options. As a consequence of this displacement of residents out of the city, the Municipality tax base was near to collapse and its economic situation worsened over the time.

The two projects in Ørestad were linked in order to achieve the strategic vision of becoming a major economic pole in the Scandinavia region. At the same time it would accommodate urban growth in this area along the new metro rail in a strategic position. Its location is probably the most important characteristic and strength of this project because of its proximity to Copenhagen historic city centre and airport. It is also located in the midpoint area between the Øresund Link which connects Malmö and Copenhagen, this condition allows that the project could receive commuter flows from both cities, generating therefore a double-city link that reinforces regional competitiveness.

==== The Ørestad model ====
The idea of this model was established when the Ørestad development corporation (ODC) was created under the Ørestad Act in 1992. The ODC was conceived as a partnership formed by the municipality and the government which owned the land in 55% and 45% respectively by that time. This hybrid corporation (public- public state) had as mission to develop the master plan for Ørestad as well as the construction of the Copenhagen Metro and the land sale, this with the purpose of attracting local and international investors with a new and modern image.

The financial model was based on the idea that the sale of plots in this area together with future revenues from ticket sales would finance the Metro construction, therefore the initial government investment will be recovered within 30 years. Along with the idea that connectivity improvement will increase the land value, was also necessary to design an attractive master plan which defines the uses and activities in the area in order to grant the special characteristics to strengthen the project in relation to its local competitors such as the Port of Copenhagen.

==== The master plan ====
The master plan for Ørestad was defined in 1995 through an international competition. As well as the Finger Plan (1947), it has a TOD project as its backbone—the Metro line—which acts as corridor of development through all the area. It also considers a concentration of high density buildings around six train stations, in special offices and services. However the area was designed with a mix of different land uses and activities in order to make it more attractive (60% of offices, 20% of housing and 20% of facilities).

The master plan organizes development along the north–south axis of the island of Amager inscribed in a rectangular area divided in four districts, which are still under construction. During the first stage of the project it was difficult to attract investments. This situation along with the non-expected high cost of the metro construction created a sense of financial crisis. As a response of this situation the government interfered by relocating important public building into the area such as the Copenhagen concert hall and the University of Copenhagen.

Even though the government has interfered in order to enhance the attractiveness of the area some external factors have prevented the expected outcomes of the project because of its strong dependence on market fluctuations. Some of these factors are the international financial crisis and the strong local real estate competition. In spite of this, the project is expected to be finished in 2025 according to the original vision and will accommodate 20,000 inhabitants and about 80,000 workers in the area.
