= Valby Park =

Park in Copenhagen

- Valbyparken
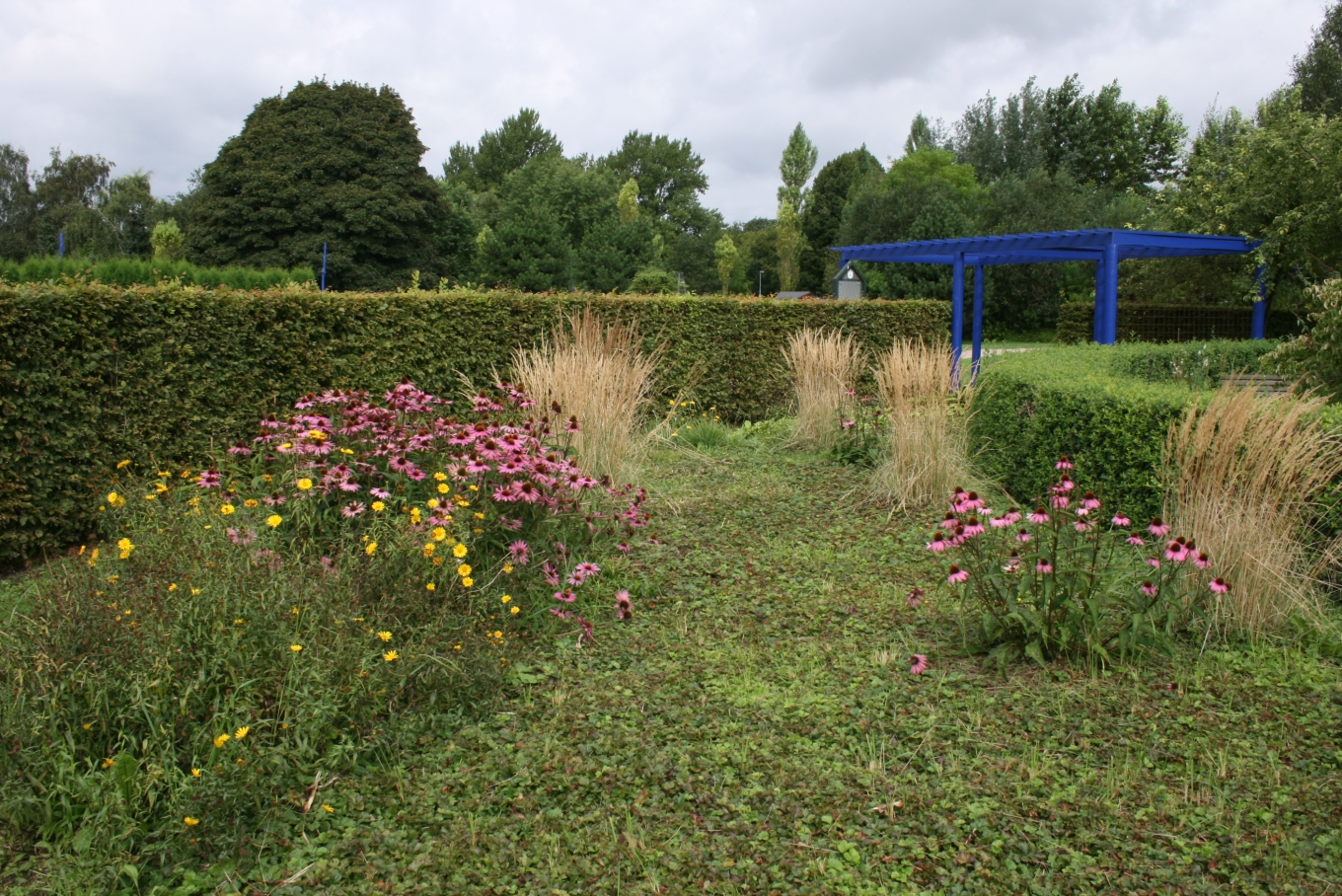
- The perennials garden (staudehaven) in Valby Park.
- Interactive map of Valby Park
- Location: Valby
- Coordinates: 55°38′30″N 12°31′10″E
- Area: 62.4 hectares (154 acres)
- Opened: 1 September 1939
- Open: All year
- Designation: Protected area (since 1966)

Valby Park (Danish: Valbyparken) is a park in Valby, Copenhagen. The park is situated south of Valby Sports Park, and west of Musikbyen facing Kalvebod Beach. The park is located between two Copenhagen Districts: Valby and Vesterbro/Kongens Enghave. Valby Park is Copenhagen's largest park with an area of 64.2 ha.

It serves as the Copenhagen venue for the travelling Grøn Koncert festival.

== History ==
The park is situated at the site of the former Valby Fælled ("Common"), which was used as landfill between 1913 and 1937. It was converted to a park between 1937 and 1939, and opened to the public on 1 September 1939. Due to fuel shortages during World War II, much of the park was dug up in 1941–42 to search for coke, though the park was re-established and expanded during 1944–52.

The park was officially designated as a protected area on 3 May 1966.

In connection with Copenhagen being the 1996 European City of Culture, 17 circular themed gardens were established in the park.

== Development ==
After Valbyparken's opening in 1939, the second stage was completed in 1952 .

In 1965, the Rosenhaven was laid out, remodeled in 1999, which is designed as a 140 meter diameter circular garden surrounded by clipped rosebushes. The rose garden contains approximately 12,000 roses from many different rosarians.

From 1966 onwards, Valby Park was given protected status.
