= Greater Copenhagen Committee =

Scandinavian political organization

The Greater Copenhagen Committee (formerly the Øresund Committee and the Greater Copenhagen and Skåne Committee) is an organisation which describes itself as a platform for regional political collaboration in the cross-boundary Øresund region. The region comprises the Capital Region and Region Zealand in Denmark and Region and Halland Region in Sweden. The region has a total population of app. 4.5 million inhabitants.

== Organisation ==
The members of the Öresund Committee were:

- In Denmark:
  - The Capital Region and Region Zealand
  - The municipalities of Bornholm, Copenhagen, and Frederiksberg
  - Greater Copenhagen Forum for Local Municipalities
- In Sweden:
  - Region Skåne
  - The municipalities of Landskrona, Lund, Helsingsborg, and Malmö

=== The Öresund Committee ===
The members themselves elected their representatives and their deputies on the Öresund Committee. There were in total 36 representatives: 18 from Sweden and 18 from Denmark and the Committee met at least twice a year.

=== The Executive Committee ===
Consists of 12 committee members; six from Sweden and six from Denmark and they meets at least four times a year.

=== The Öresund Committee Secretariat ===
The Secretariat is based in Copenhagen and is responsible for bringing political decisions to fruition. The Öresund Committee is hosting ØresundDirekt and Interreg IVA.

== Past activities ==
In 2009 – 2010 the Öresund Committee highlighted four specific issues:

1. Dismantling cross-border obstacles that inhibit the labour market.
2. Investing in a new infrastructure for the region and analyzing the importance of tolls for the bridge across Öresund and transport costs for integration.
3. Strengthening good relations at the grassroots level and promote social and association contacts and cooperation across Öresund and thereby establish a cultural metropolis.
4. A new vision and strategy for the Öresund Region 2025
