= Friheden, Denmark =

Area of Copenhagen, Denmark

Friheden
- Neighbourhood
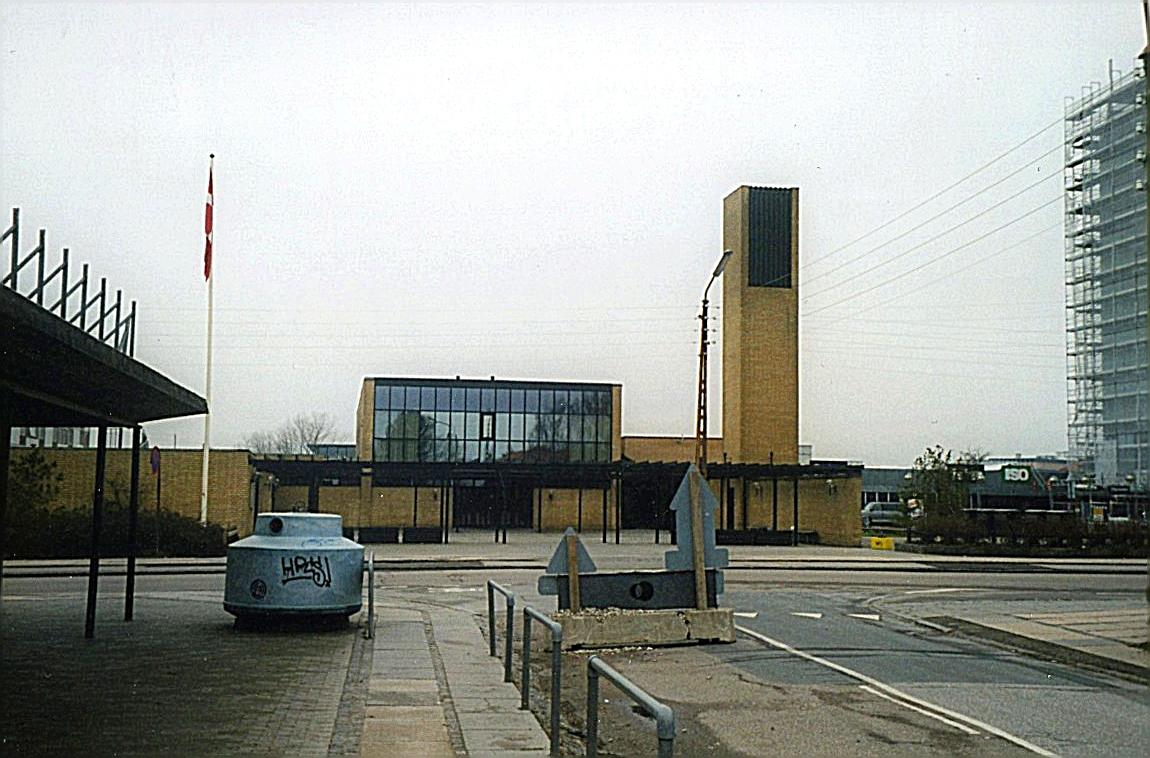
- Church in Friheden; Strandmarkskirken
- Interactive map of Friheden
- Coordinates: 55°37′44″N 12°28′56″E
- Country: Denmark
- Region: Capital Region of Denmark
- Municipality: Hvidovre

Friheden is the southeast part of Hvidovre and a Copenhagen suburb.

The town's focal points are Friheden railway station, used by 7000 passengers each day, and Frihedens Butikscenter which is a shopping center with varied shops, including Friheden Library. There are several schools, youth centers and clubs used by the many children and adolescents who live in Friheden.

Friheden housing is primarily public, managed by housing associations AKB, KAB, and Lejerbo.

== The Liberty Gate ==
The Liberty Gate (Danish: Frihedens port) is a sculpture created in 1981 by Hein Heinsen, Stig Brøgger, and Mogens Møller. It is one of the most controversial works of art in Hvidovre. The work illustrates the theme about change: the straight concrete gate is a commentary on the modern cityscape, as it looks now, while the raw gneiss block, resting on a corner of the gate, is more than 100 million years old and represents the untamed mountains.

== Sports ==
In Friheden Sports Center, there are many sports such as handball, swimming, and jumping gymnastics. There are also winter sports like curling, ice hockey, and figure skating.
