= Damhus Lake =

- Damhussøen (Danish)
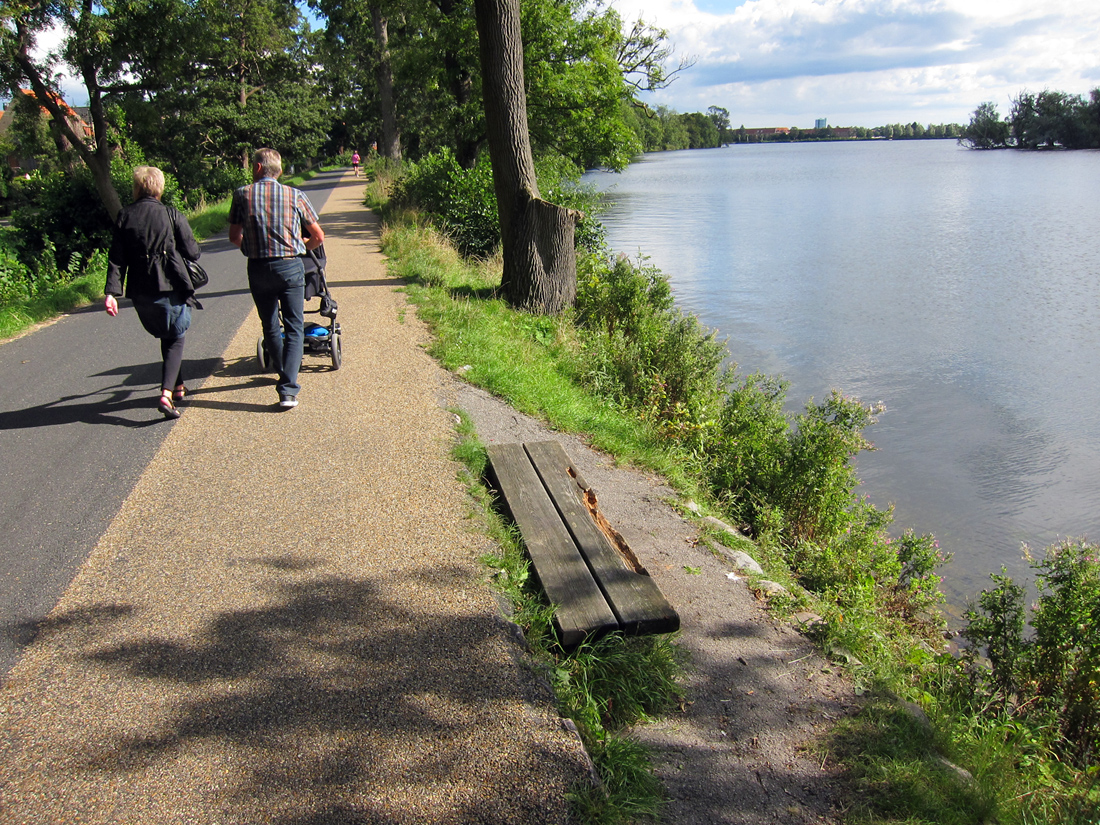
- A view from the eastern side of Damhus Lake.

- Location within Copenhagen
- Location: Vanløse, Copenhagen Municipality
- Coordinates: 55°40′30″N 12°28′40″E
- Type: Artificial lake
- Surface area: 46 ha (110 acres)
- Average depth: 1.6 m (5.2 ft)
- Max. depth: 2.4 m (7.9 ft)
- Settlements: Rødovre; Vanløse

Damhus Lake (Danish: Damhussøen or Damhus Sø) is a lake located just north of Roskildevej, between Rødovre, Vanløse and Frederiksberg, on the western outskirts of inner Copenhagen, Denmark. Damhus Meadow (Danish: Damhusengen), once a part of the lake, is located on the north side of the lake.

== History ==
Damhus Lake is an artificial lake which was created some time during the Middle Ages when a dam was built on Harrestrup River (Harrestrup Å). The first known reference to it is from 1561 when king Frederick II gives it to the University of Copenhagen. From 1618, the lake played a role in Copenhagen's water supply. It was then known as Langevadsdam. The name referred to the "Lange vad" ("long ford") to the south of the lake. The lake's current southern shoreline was defined in 1620–21 when an embankment was built across marshy stretch for the new Roskilde Road. The aim of the embankment was not only to protect the road against flooding but also to secure a more stable supply of water to Copenhagen by raising the water level in the lake. The water drained into St. Jørgen's Lake closer to the city through the artificial Ladegård Canal.

The Roskilde Road was a toll road until 1915. A building at the southwestern corner of the lake, Langevadsdamhuset, colloquially known as Damhuset, served as toll house. The lake gradually got its contemporary name from this toll house around 1800.

In 1849, a new embankment was constructed across the lake, separating it in two. In the 1920s and 1930s, Harestrup Å caused frequent floodings and it had also become known for its unpleasant odour. In 1938 it was therefore decided to regulate it in connection with the city's establishment of the new public park Vigerslevparken. The stream was disconnected from the northern part of the lake, known as Bagsøen ("The Rear Lake"), which was drained and converted into present-day Damhusengen (Damhus Meadow). In 1941, both lake and meadow were given status as public park. They were protected by the Conservation Authority in 1966.
