= Copenhagen metropolitan area =

Commuter belt surrounding Copenhagen, Denmark

Coordinates: 55.68°N 12.57°E

Copenhagen metropolitan area Hovedstadsområdet
- Metropolitan area
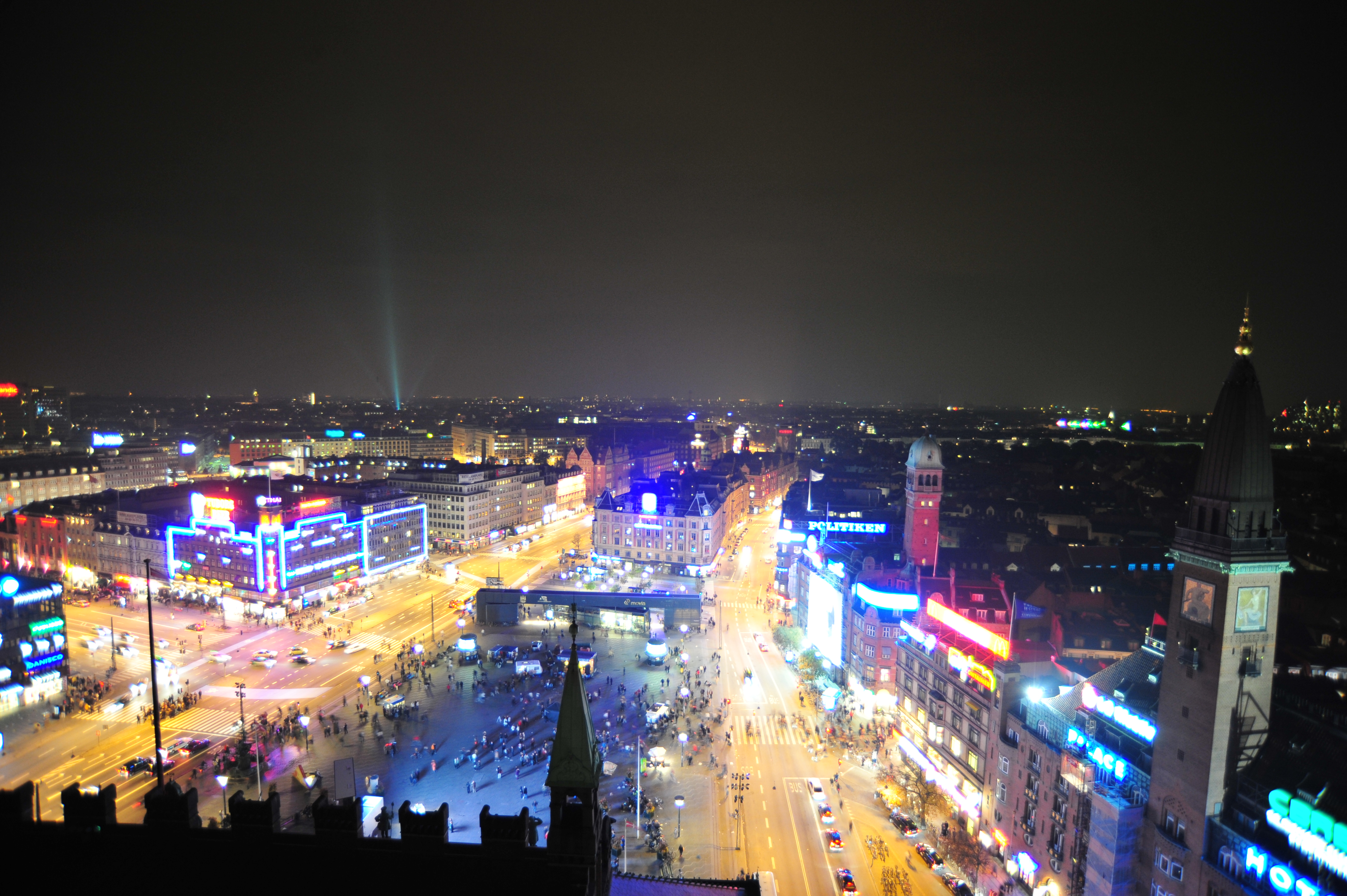
- Copenhagen city center at night

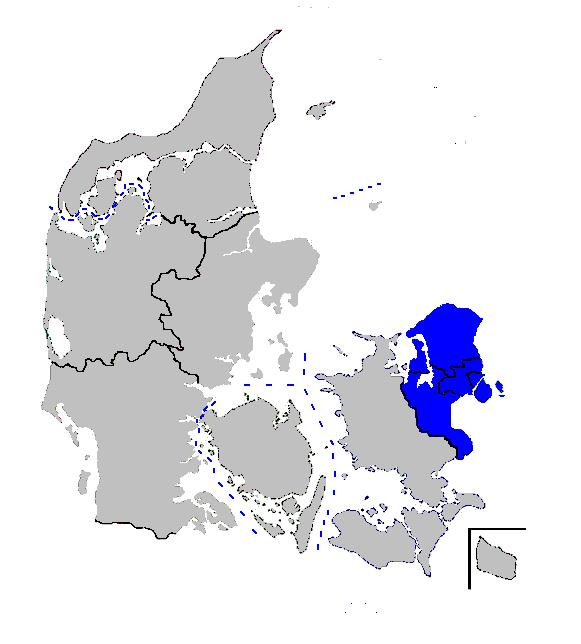
- Copenhagen Metropolitan Area (in blue)
- Country: Denmark
- Largest city: Copenhagen

Area
  - Metro: 2,778 km^{2} (1,073 sq mi)

Population
  - Metro: 2,400,000 (OECD)
  - Metro density: 864/km^{2} (2,240/sq mi)

GDP
  - Metro: €178.8 billion
- Time zone: UTC+1 (CET)

The Copenhagen metropolitan area or Metropolitan Copenhagen (Danish: Hovedstadsområdet, pronounced [ˈhoːð̩stæðsʌmˌʁɔːðət], literally "The Capital Area") is a large commuter belt (the area in which it is practical to commute to work) surrounding Copenhagen, the capital of Denmark. It includes Copenhagen Municipality, Frederiksberg and surrounding municipalities stretching westward across Zealand. It has a densely populated core surrounded by suburban settlements.

The metropolitan area has several current definitions and also some historical, now defunct, definitions. The most widely accepted is the area which is strategically managed by the Finger Plan. The modern post 2007 version includes the four provinces Københavns by (Copenhagen city), Københavns omegn, Nordsjælland and Østsjælland, with a total land area of 2 778 km^{2} and over 2 million inhabitants (16 March 2018, updated statistics from 1 January 2018 on cities (Danish byer, (singular) by) published later). It should not be confused with the Øresund Region or the Capital Region of Denmark. The public transit company of all of East Denmark, except Bornholm, is called Movia.

== Finger Plan ==
The most of Copenhagen's urban area with motorways (red lines) and trains (gray lines)

The area has been planned according to the Finger Plan, which has given it six fingers of S-trains and a western connection S-line (Ringbanen or line F). Urbanization stretching out from central Copenhagen. One railroad and two metro lines over Amager have been formed. The Amager railroad continues to Sweden by bridge.

Copenhagen metropolitan area is the largest of the commonly used definitions for the Copenhagen area. It has been defined administratively by the former Capital Region and is also known locally as HT-området (area once served by the publicly owned mass transit company) because it was the zone where the capital area public traffic company formerly known as HT operated (now Movia), and was therefore the limit for how far you could go on a Copenhagen bus or train-ticket. Until 2007 the area consisted of Copenhagen and Frederiksberg Municipalities, Copenhagen County, Frederiksborg County and Roskilde County. After the municipal reform of Denmark 1 January 2007, the Danish counties were abolished and Vallø municipality which was a part of the metropolitan area was merged with Stevns municipality which previously was outside the metropolitan area and the new Stevns municipality became a part of the metropolitan area.

Copenhagen metropolitan area now consists of 28 of the 29 municipalities of the Capital Region (all except Bornholm) as well as the municipalities of Greve, Køge, Lejre, Roskilde, Solrød and Stevns from the Region Zealand.

By this definition, the metropolitan area has a population of 2,016,285 (as of 1 January 2016) covering an area of 3,030 square kilometres (1,170 sq mi) over 34 municipalities with a density of 665/km^{2} (1725/sq mi).

== Capital Region of Denmark ==
The administrative entity responsible for the Capital Region of Denmark defines their administrative area as the metropolitan area of Copenhagen. As such the population is 1,911,067 (1 January 2024) on an area of 2,561 km^{2} with a density of 744.1/km^{2} (1,927/sq mi). It should however be noted that the Capital Region does not contain all of the Roskilde and Køge Bay fingers as well as all of the urban area which stretches into Region Zealand. Furthermore, it does contain the remote island of Bornholm.

== Øresund Region ==
Map of the Øresund Region—surrounding the Øresund strait which separates Zealand from Scania—extending as far east as Bornholm

While actually a transnational region of co-operation, rather than a metropolitan area, the Øresund Region is by some considered to constitute the metropolitan area of Copenhagen. This goes back to the Initiativgruppen (a group tasked for developing the Copenhagen area in 1989), which was tasked with creating the metropole of the north. However, the region promotes their commercial interests through the cooperative interest organisation Greater Copenhagen. As of 1 October 2011 the Øresund Region is populated by 3,783,158 inhabitants with a density of 181.3/km^{2} (469.5/sq mi) (Danish side: 2,531,945, Swedish side: 1,251,213). According to OECD, however, this region includes vast areas which are not recognized as part of the functional metropolitan area.

=== Core of the Øresund Region ===
Copenhagen is by far the largest city, and the obvious core of the region. However the Øresund Region covers large areas that are located remotely from both Copenhagen and the Øresund sea, some with a rather low population density. Hence, a better area for comparison with other regions, bi-lateral or national ones, is a lot narrower and includes the four Danish provinces Copenhagen by, Copenhagen omegn, Nordsjælland and Østsjælland with a total area of only 2.768,6 square kilometres with 2,045,259 inhabitants as of 1 January 2019 And on the Swedish side the 17 Scanian municipalities that either has direct border to the Øresund Sea or borders to a such municipality. (Bjuv, Burlöv, Eslöv, Helsingborg, Höganäs, Kävlinge, Landskrona, Lomma, Lund, Malmö, Staffanstorp, Svedala, Svalöv, Trelleborg, Vellinge, Åstorp and Ängelholm) These municipalities covers a total area of 3,387.5 square kilometres and had a population of 1,003,631 inhabitants by 1.January 2019 A total population of 2,931,445 living at an aggregate area of 5,969.9 km^{2}, with a population density of 491.0 inhabitants per km^{2} of land. This is an illustration of the population and population density around the Øresund sea rather than a formal area. But as such the population around Øresund constitutes by far the largest population centre of Scandinavia and Finland.

=== Copenhagen metropolitan area (within Denmark only) ===
Copenhagen metropolitan area is most commonly recognized, and before 2007 official, equal to the Danish part of this "core". The four mentioned Danish provinces, with two million inhabitants at a land area of 2.768,6 km^{2} and a population density of 722 people per square kilometre. While the administrational Region Hovedstaden includes the remote Baltic Sea island Bornholm, but excludes important suburbs south-west and west of the city as well as the locally important towns Køge and Roskilde which both are largely build together with the Danish capital through newer suburban areas.

=== Political reasons ===
Some Danish politicians simply do not want more than a third of the Danish Kingdom to be considered as parts of the capital, while remote areas on islands without fixed connections as well as parts of the windy North Sea coast get lower population figures. The 2007 regional and municipality reforms aimed to level figures out more evenly. Before 1970 there were 1098 Danish municipalities, between 1970 and 2006 this figure varied between 277 (from 1 April 1974 275, 1 January 2003 271, 1 January 2006 270) and 270. And by 2007 they were merged into 98, however Copenhagen has not been allowed to include any new land area since 1902, despite Frederiksberg with 100,000+ inhabitants, on an 8.8 km^{2} surface, ever since 1901 has been an enclave totally surrounded by Copenhagen. After 1902 Copenhagen municipality has only grown geographically through land reclamation.

== OECD ==
OECD (Organisation for Economic Co-operation and Development) defines the Copenhagen metropolitan area with a population of 2,390,000 inhabitants as of 2009. According to OECD the Finger Plan doesn't include the entire functional/economic metropolitan area of Copenhagen.

== Other definitions ==
The local TV stations TV2/Lorry, Kanal København and Hovedstads-TV each also defines the Copenhagen metropolitan area as the area they respectively cover. This corresponds with the area which the four provinces (Copenhagen by, Copenhagen omegn, Nordsjælland and Østsjælland) cover;the provinces are based on European Union's so called NUTS 3 areas. The same area is used for the ticket fare system of all public transport within Greater Copenhagen and the Fingerplan area.

== See also ==
- Urban area of Copenhagen
- Largest metropolitan areas in the Nordic countries
- List of European city regions
