= Øresund Region =

Transnational region in Copenhagen, Denmark and Malmö, Sweden

Coordinates: 55°34′N 12°49′E

Øresund Region Öresundsregionen (Swedish) Øresundsregionen (Danish)
- Urban area
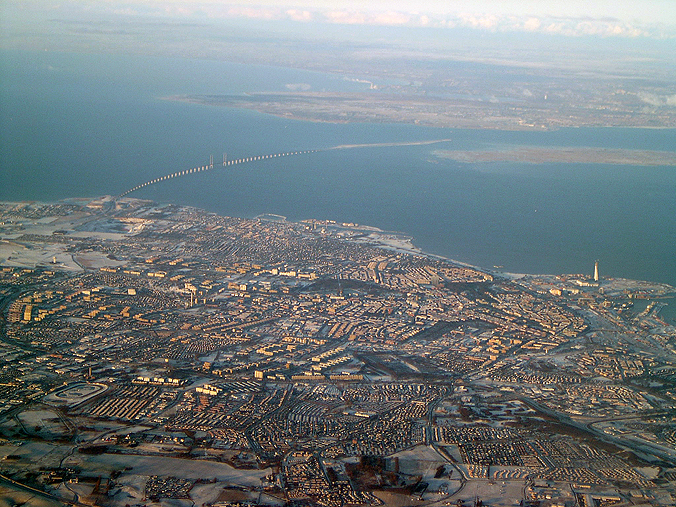
- The Øresund strait between Malmö and Copenhagen with Malmö in the foreground and the island of Amager and part of southern Copenhagen in the background

- Map of the Øresund region
- Country: Denmark; Sweden
- Largest city: Copenhagen (1,366,301)

Area
  - Metro: 20,868 km^{2} (8,057 sq mi)

Population
  - Metro: 4,083,260
  - Metro density: 195.7/km^{2} (507/sq mi)

GDP
  - Metro: €285.954 billion (2024)
  - Per capita: €63,700 (2024)

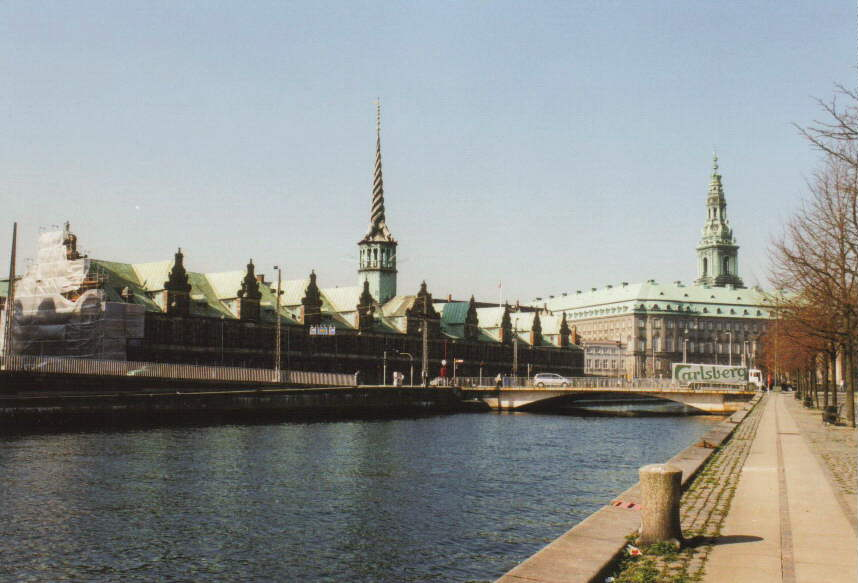
Copenhagen, with the Danish Parliament to the right and the former Stock Exchange on the left

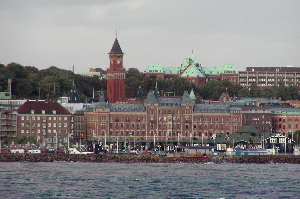
Helsingborg is Sweden's ninth largest city.

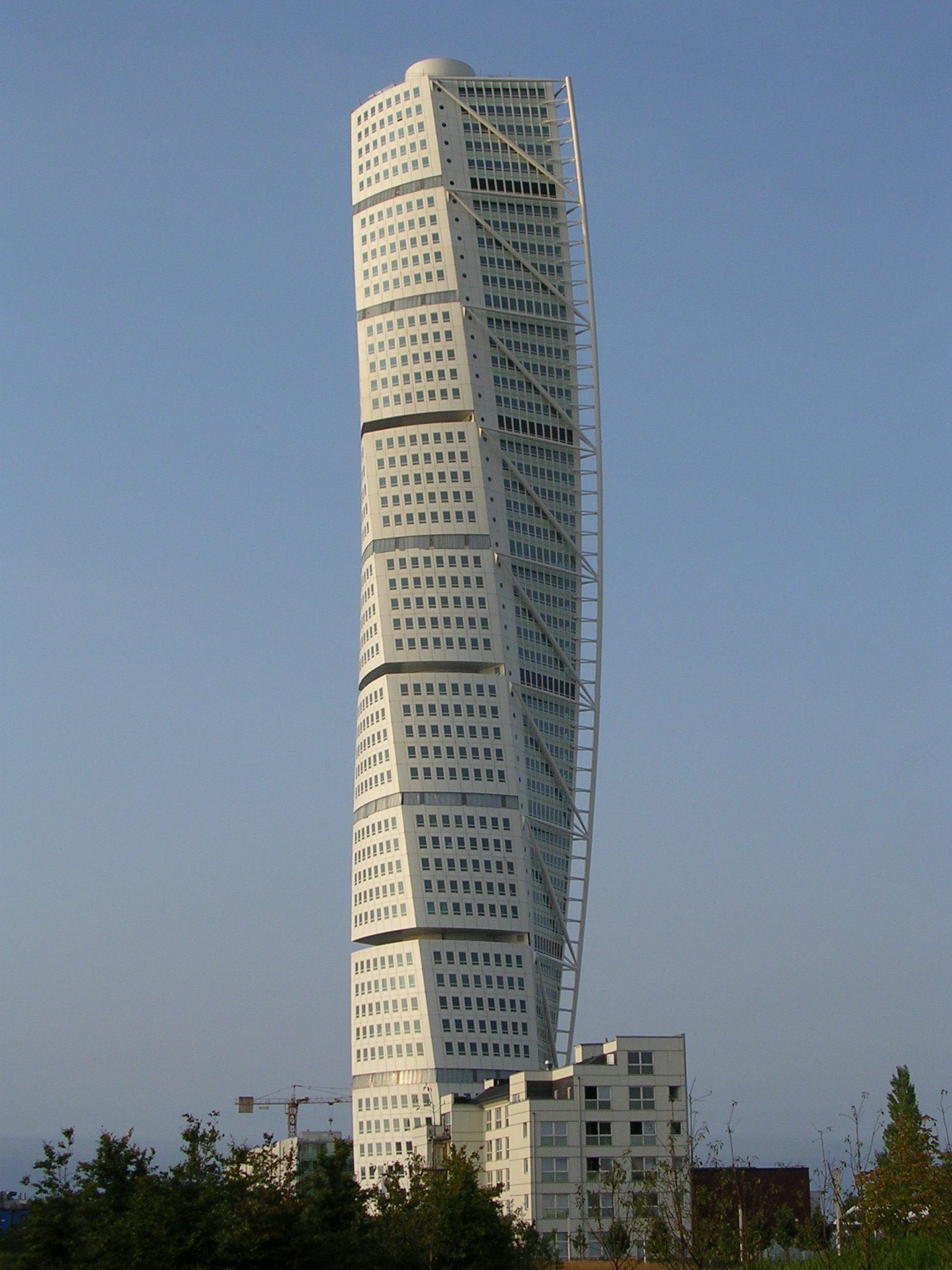
The Turning Torso skyscraper in Malmö, Sweden.

The Øresund Region (Danish: Øresundsregionen [ˈøːɐsɔnsʁekiˌoˀnn̩]; Swedish: Öresundsregionen [œːrɛˈsɵ̂nːdsrɛɡɪˌuːnɛn]) is a transnational metropolitan region encompassing the Capital Region of Denmark and Region Zealand in eastern Denmark and Region Skåne in southern Sweden. Centred around the Øresund strait and the two cities which lie on either side, Copenhagen in Denmark and Malmö in Sweden, the region is connected by the Øresund Bridge, which spans the strait at its southern end, and the HH Ferry route between Helsingør, Denmark, and Helsingborg, Sweden, at the narrowest point of the strait.

The region has a population of approximately 4.1 million (2023) and a population density of 197/km^{2} (510/sq mi). The Øresund Region consists of both rural and urban areas. Areas on the periphery of the region have a relatively low population density, whereas the two metropolitan areas of Copenhagen and Malmö are two of the most densely populated in Scandinavia. Helsingborg also forms an important urban hub on the Swedish side.

== Cross-border activity ==
The Øresund Region is an important hub for economic activity in Scandinavia.

In 2007, almost 25 million people traveled over the Øresund Bridge: 15.2 million by car and bus, and 9.6 million by train. By 2009, the figure had risen to a total of 35.6 million travellers by car, coach, train or ferry.

Statistics compiled in January 2007 show 14,000 people commuting each day over the Öresund Bridge. Compared with 2005, the commuter traffic increased by 43% in 2006. The growing number of Swedes commuting in order to take advantage of the need for labour on the job market in Copenhagen and the higher salaries offered in Denmark, as well as an increased immigration of Danes to the south of Sweden, were essential factors in the traffic increase. In 2006, 4,300 persons moved from the Danish part of the Øresund Region to Scania, attracted by lower Scanian real estate prices. Since July 2000, 22,500 Danes have moved to Scania.

Apart from work related commuting, Swedes cross over to Copenhagen to enjoy shopping and nightlife, to attend cultural and educational institutions and to use Copenhagen Airport. The largest airport in Scania, Malmö Airport is located 47 km (29.2 mi) from Copenhagen Airport and has limited international air traffic.

After the opening of the bridge in 2000, an 'Öresund identity' has been promoted in the region in order to counter-act various barriers to cross-border cooperation caused by nationalistic sentiments on both sides. In 1997, a consortium of twelve universities (four Swedish and eight Danish) from both sides of the Sound has been established, opening up all courses, libraries and other facilities to all students, teachers and researchers from the region. The universities have 150,000 students and more than 14,000 researchers combined. The secretariat is located at Lund University and at the University of Copenhagen.

The commercial interaction across the border has also significantly increased. In 2018, an average of 19,100 vehicles crossed the bridge each day.

The ports of Copenhagen and Malmö were merged in 2001 to form a single company, Copenhagen Malmö Port. This cross-border merger of two ports into one legal entity is the first in history, according to Copenhagen Malmö Port AB, the Swedish registered limited liability company operating the port, a company equally owned by Port of Copenhagen and Port of Malmö.

In May 2018 the Øresundsmetro Executive was announced, formed of representatives from the two cities, industry and researchers, to explore the proposal to link Copenhagen and Malmö via a driverless metro system, with travel time of around 20 minutes compared to 35 minutes by train.

According to the population registry, as of 2023, 12,872 Swedes live in the Danish regions of the Øresund region and 19,540 Danes in Scania as of 2021. While the number of Swedes in the Danish regions has steadily increased from 10,507 in 2008, the number of Danes living in Scania has decreased from nearly 24,000 in 2009 to 19,540 in 2021. 7,564 Danes live in Malmö, 2,052 in Helsingborg and 862 in Lund, while 5,539 Swedes live in Copenhagen, 937 in Frederiksberg and over 500 in both Gentofte and Helsingør.

== Political and administrative structure ==
In 1993, local, regional and national authorities established the Øresund Committee as a regional policy forum. In 2016, as a compromise, following the debate about the name change, it was initially renamed The Greater Copenhagen & Skåne Committee. When Halland joined the colleboration, its name was shortened to the Greater Copenhagen Committee. The forum consists of 18 politicians, whose election periods differ as they comply with the functional period for the various authorities they represent.

The committee is legally a member organization funded by its members and by the Nordic Council through external project funding. The European Union cross-border projects have supported the region through Interreg II (1994–1999) and Interreg IIIA, operative since the end of 2000. In 1997, an EU-funded EURORES project was launched in the region in order to promote a common labor market.

In 2020, Tue David Bak assumed the position as managing director of Greater Copenhagen's secretariate in Copenhagen.

== Challenges ==
One deterrent to closer economic integration is the lack of a single currency, as both Sweden and Denmark maintain their own currencies, the Danish krone and Swedish krona, although both are accepted in some areas of the other country.

Another problem has been a lack of transparency of the rules for taxes, social security, pension and unemployment benefits. While specific tax treaties exist for the region, there are still problems with administering them. People commuting to work over the border (Danish: grænsegænger, Swedish: gränsarbetare) had a problem receiving information of rules affecting them and sometimes risked paying double taxes. They also risked losing the right to unemployment benefits because foreign employment did not contribute to entitlements in their home state, losing the right to kindergarten for their small children for the same reason etc. Some of these problems have been solved after the recent years of political coordination between the countries, but the local tax authorities have difficulties implementing the complex rules for cross-border taxation.

An imbalance in the municipal budgets is also a problem, since the flow of commuters move mostly in one direction: from the residential side in Sweden to the labor market side in Denmark. Rules of taxation have left the Scanian municipalities with increased costs not covered by increased tax revenues from the growing commuter population mainly taxed in the country of employment.

A fourth problem is voting privileges; Danes living in the Swedish part of the Øresund Region, but working in the Danish part, lose their right to vote in general elections in Denmark even if they work in Denmark.

== Universities ==
- Copenhagen Business School, Copenhagen
- IT University of Copenhagen, Copenhagen
- University of Copenhagen, Copenhagen
- Technical University of Denmark, Copenhagen
- Lund University, Lund
- Malmö University, Malmö
- World Maritime University, Malmö
- Swedish University of Agricultural Sciences, Malmö
- Roskilde University, Roskilde

== Statistics ==
Region	Population	Area	Density
Capital Region of Denmark	1,891,871	2,568 km²	709.76 /km²
Region Zealand	849,857	7,273 km²	114.81 /km²
Skåne County	1,402,425	11,027 km²	120 /km²
Total	4,083,260	20,868 km²	195.7 /km²

Data as of January 1, 2023

== Statistical areas ==
The region is divided into seven statistical areas (NUTS 3), six in Denmark and one in Sweden.

1. Byen København
2. Københavns omegn
3. Nordsjælland
4. Bornholm
5. Østsjælland
6. Vest- og Sydsjælland
7. Skåne län

== See also ==
- Eurodistrict
