= Ejby, Glostrup =

Coordinates: 55.69610°N 12.40835°E

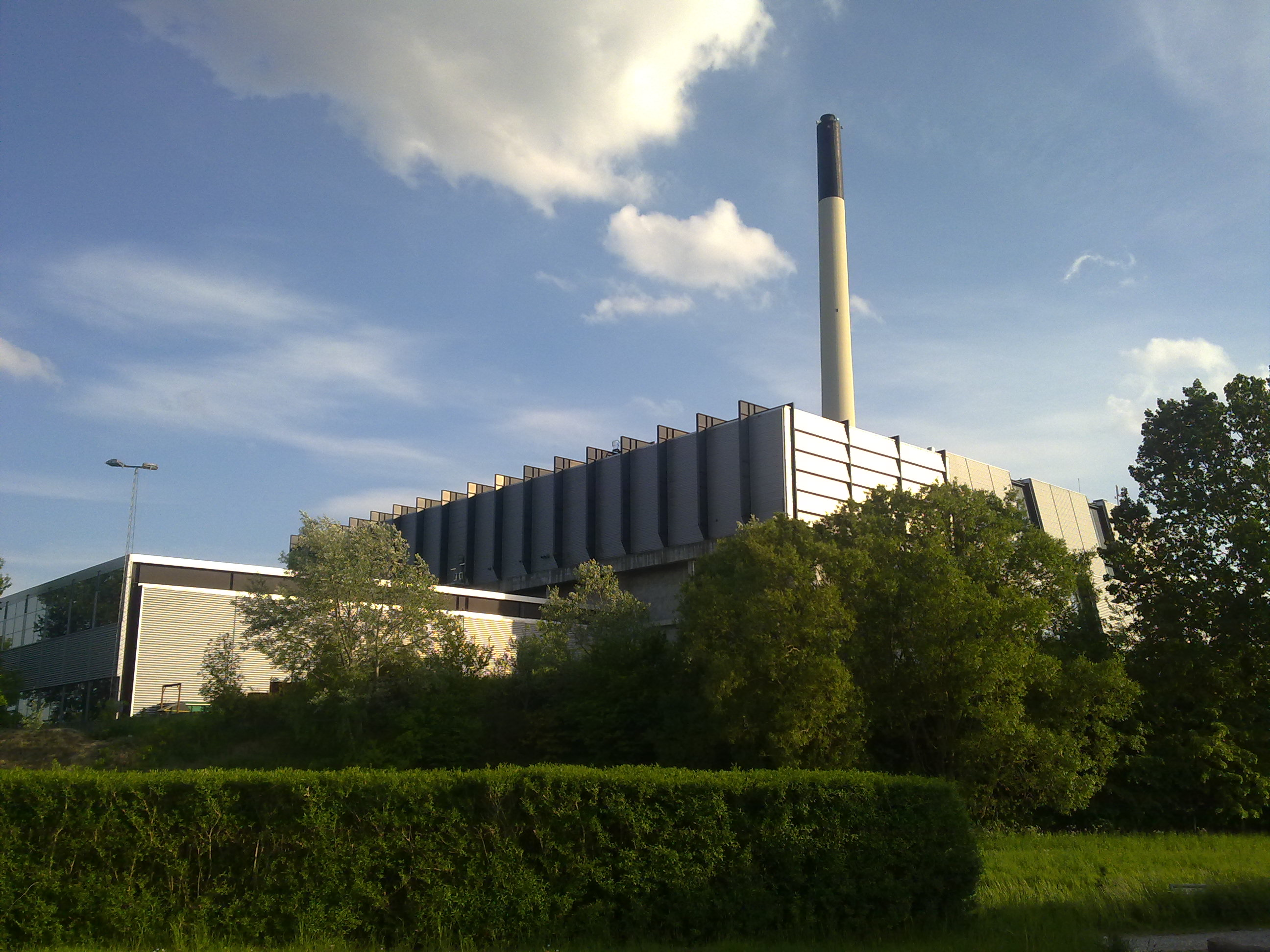
"Vestforbrænding", a waste incineration facility in Ejby

Ejby is a suburb in greater Copenhagen in Glostrup Municipality, lying between Glostrup and Skovlunde. It is located about 13 km (8.1 miles) from the city centre of Copenhagen.

Ejby has a station on the Greater Copenhagen Light Rail line which opened in October 2025.

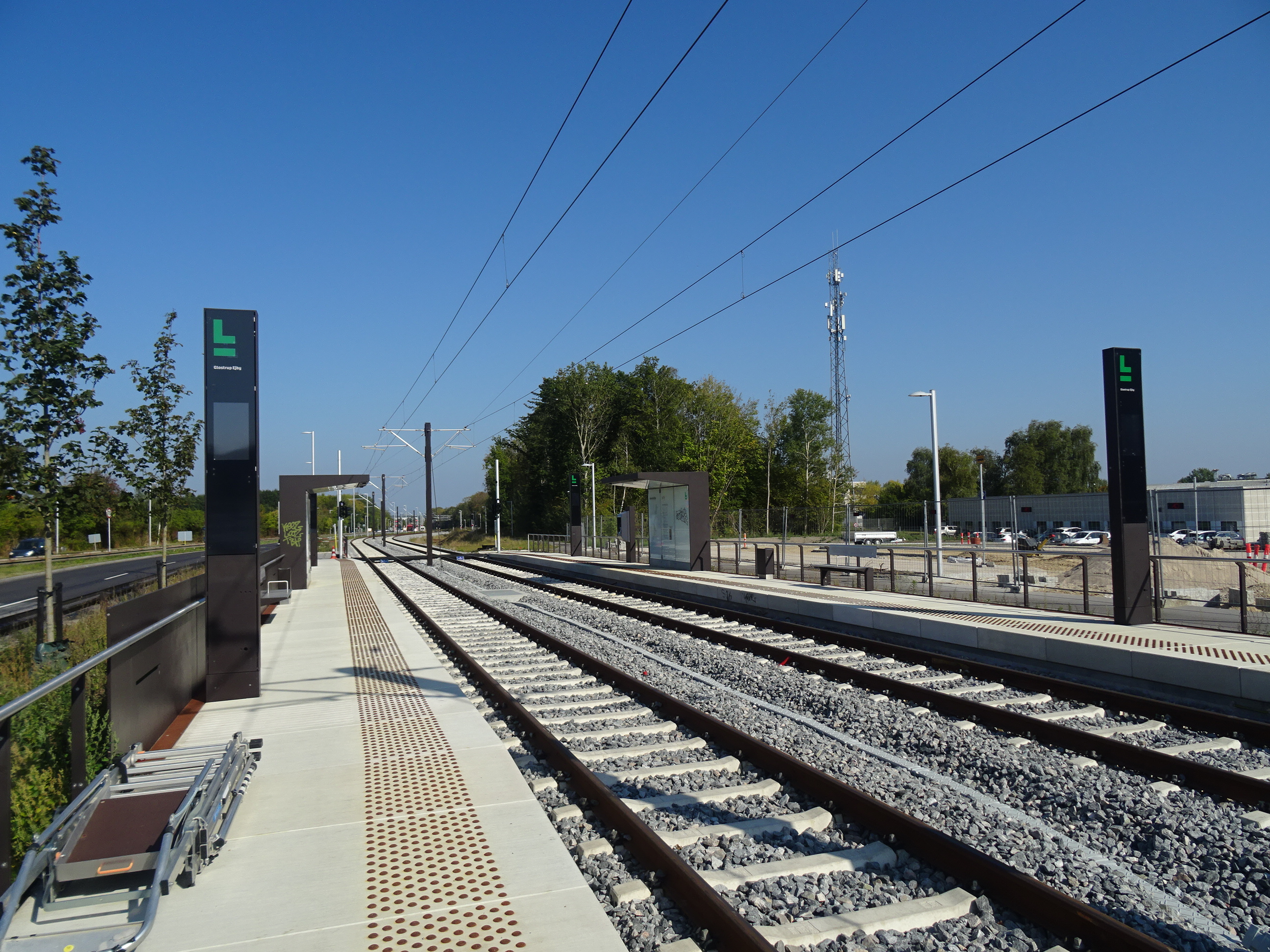
Glostrup Ejby station in 2024
