= Hvissinge =

Coordinates: 55°40′45″N 12°25′07″E

Hvissinge (or Hvessinge on some maps, though not in local signage) is a suburb approximately 13 km west of central Copenhagen. Originally a small village, the town grew quickly in the 1970s along with Glostrup. It is part of Glostrup Municipality and situated 2 km north east of the city centre.

== Notable people ==
- Jens Østerholm (1928 in Hvissinge – 2006) a Danish film actor
