= Bryggebroen =

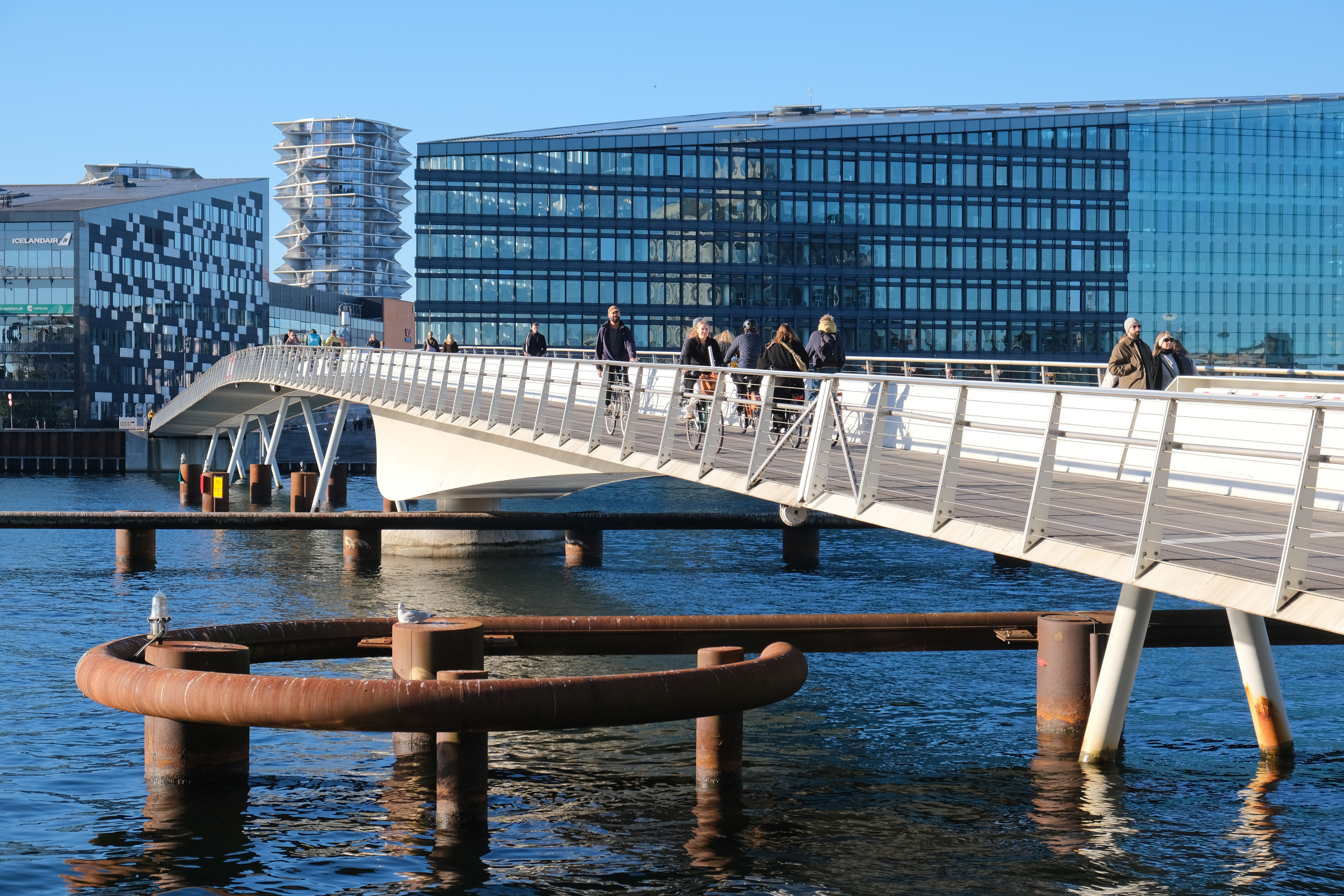
- Coordinates: 55°39′41.5″N 12°34′0.0″E
- Carries: Pedestrian and bicycle
- Crosses: Copenhagen Harbour
- Locale: Islands Brygge; Havneholmen

Characteristics
- Design: steel structure
- Total length: 190 metres (620 ft)
- Width: 5.5 metres (18 ft)
- Clearance below: 5.45 metres (17.9 ft)

History
- Designer: Dissing + Weitling
- Opened: 14 September 2006

Location
- Interactive map of Bryggebroen

Bryggebroen (lit. 'The Quay Bridge') is one of the new bicycle/pedestrian bridges in Copenhagen inner harbour and is a 190 metres (620 ft) combined pedestrian and bicyclist bridge directed east-west. The bridge is joined to Kalvebod Brygge and Cykelslangen bridge (west) and Islands Brygge (east) and thus connects Vesterbro on Zealand and Amager. The bridge has become a popular place for attaching love padlocks.

The bridge which opened to public on 14 September 2006 is 5.5 metres (18 ft) wide, divided by a pedestrian path and cycling path and constructed as a swing bridge to allow larger sailing vessels to pass.

The name of the bridge was among the suggestions in a naming project organized by the Danish daily Politiken in which more than 200 suggestions were submitted. The name Bryggebroen was elected by the newspaper as the winner because it connects the two quays (lit.: brygger) Islands Brygge and Kalvebod Brygge. The Copenhagen street name committee then accepted the name and it became official.

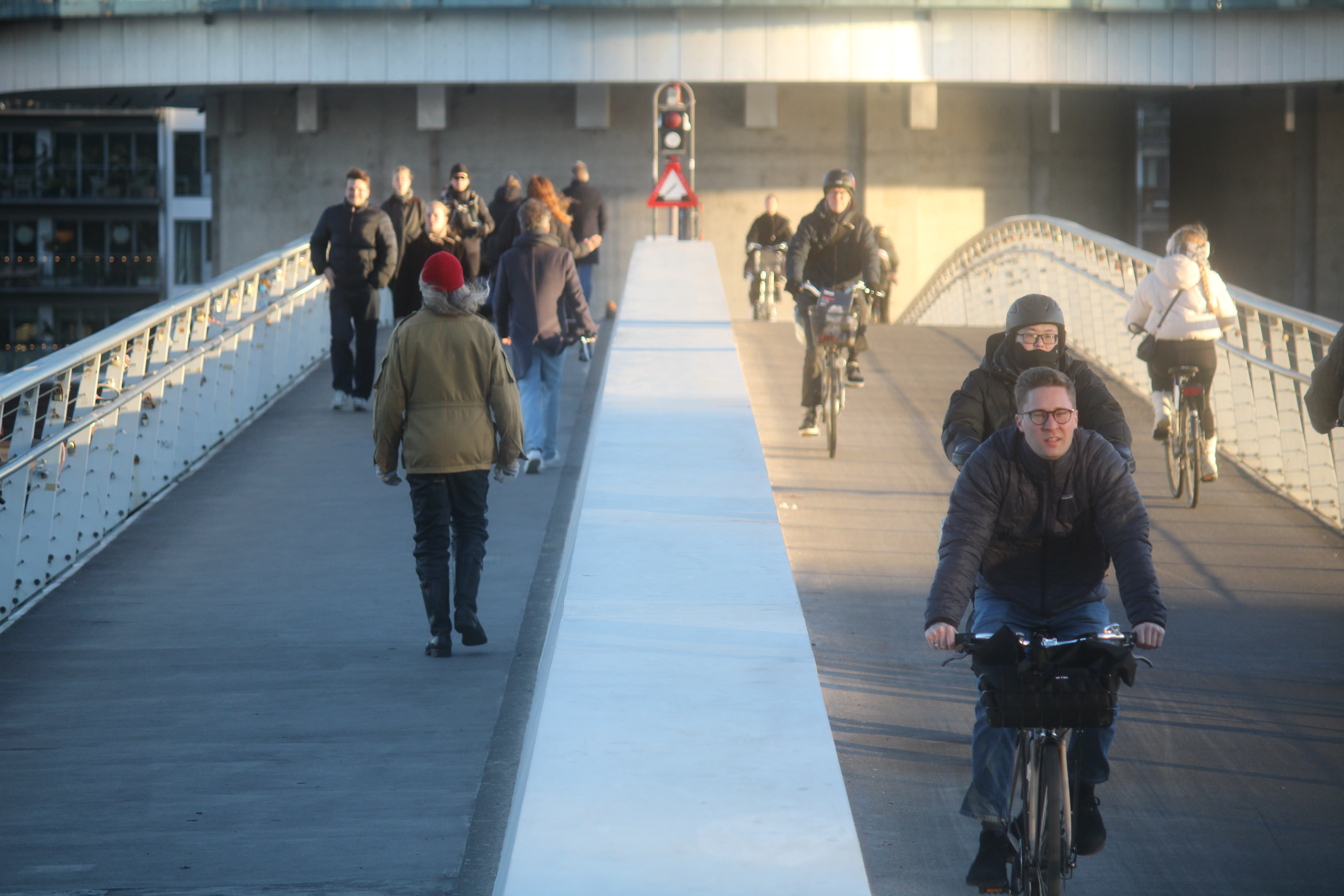
Bryggebroen seen from Kalvebod Brygge, 2025

When the bridge was opened, the area surrounding it was still a construction site which created a need for a construction of a temporary wooden bridge on the west side. Also, it was necessary to create a temporary path, south of the shopping mall Fisketorvet. Both construction resulting in additional expenses of approx. DKK 8 mio. (approx. EUR 1 mio.).
