= Heinrich Fromm =

Heinrich Fromm (1886-1956) was a German Jewish art collector, interned at Dachau who emigrated to the United Kingdom.

== Life ==
Heinrich Fromm was born on 31 March 1886 in Augsburg, Germany. He worked for his family's firm Firma Joachim Fromm in Munich and was a part owner of the Günther Franke's Graphisches Kabinett.

He married Helene (Leni) Degginger and they had three children.

When the Nazis came to power in 1933, the Fromms were persecuted due to their Jewish heritage. Fromm was arrested and held at the Dachau camp, before fleeing to the United Kingdom.

His son Robert Fromm lived in the United Kingdom.

== Art collection ==
Fromm collected art by Max Beckmann and owned Beckmann's The Night and Der Eiserne Steg, which are now in the collection of the Kunstsammlung Nordrhein-Westfalen, as well as The Bath and Lido, now in the Saint Louis Art Museum and Bildnis Frau Dr. Heidel, now in the Hamburg Kunsthalle. Other works by Beckmann in the Fromm collection included Sonnenaufgang, Stadtansicht mit Eisernem Steg, Schöne Aussicht (Winterlandschaft) and Stilleben mit Grammophon und Schwertlilien.

Provenance research projects at the Nordrhein-Westfalen are investigating the circumstances under which artworks from the Fromm collection entered the museum collection

== See also ==
- List of Claims for Restitution for Nazi-looted art
- Degenerate Art
- The Holocaust
