= Havneholmen, Copenhagen =

Area in the harbor of Copenhagen, Denmark

Coordinates: 55.6608°N 12.5631°E

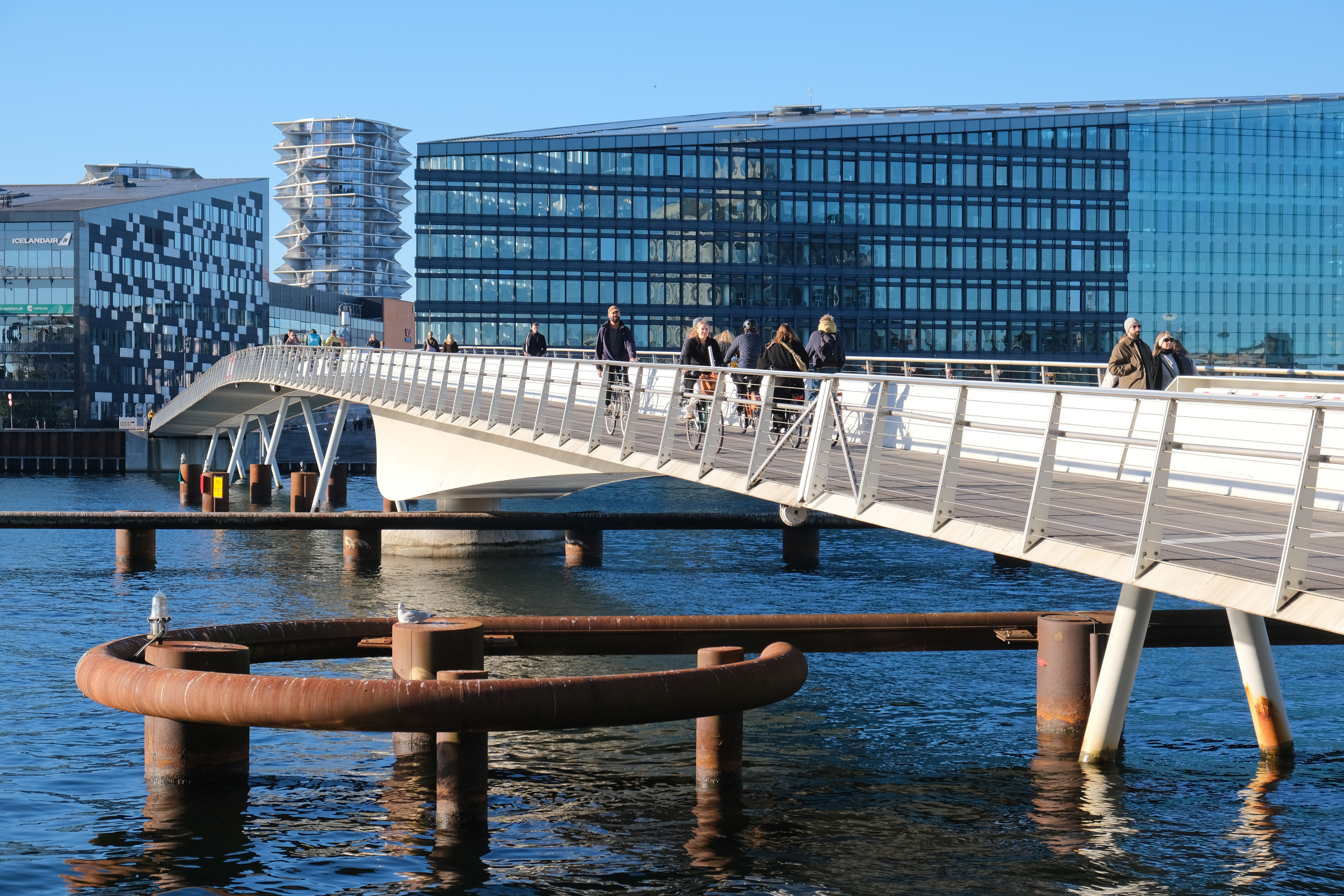
Havneholmen viewed from Islands Brygge with Brygge Bridge in the foreground

Havneholmen (lit. 'The Harbour Isle') is a mixed-use development located on reclaimed land off Kalvebod Brygge in the harbor of Copenhagen, Denmark. It is located just east of the shopping centre Fisketorvet from which it is separated by a narrow canal, although it is annexed to mainland Kalvebod Brygge at its southern end.

Havneholmen is connected to Islands Brygge on the other side of the harbor by Brygge Bridge, a foot and cycling bridge. Tømmergraven Canal separates it from Enghave Brygge to the south.

== Construction ==
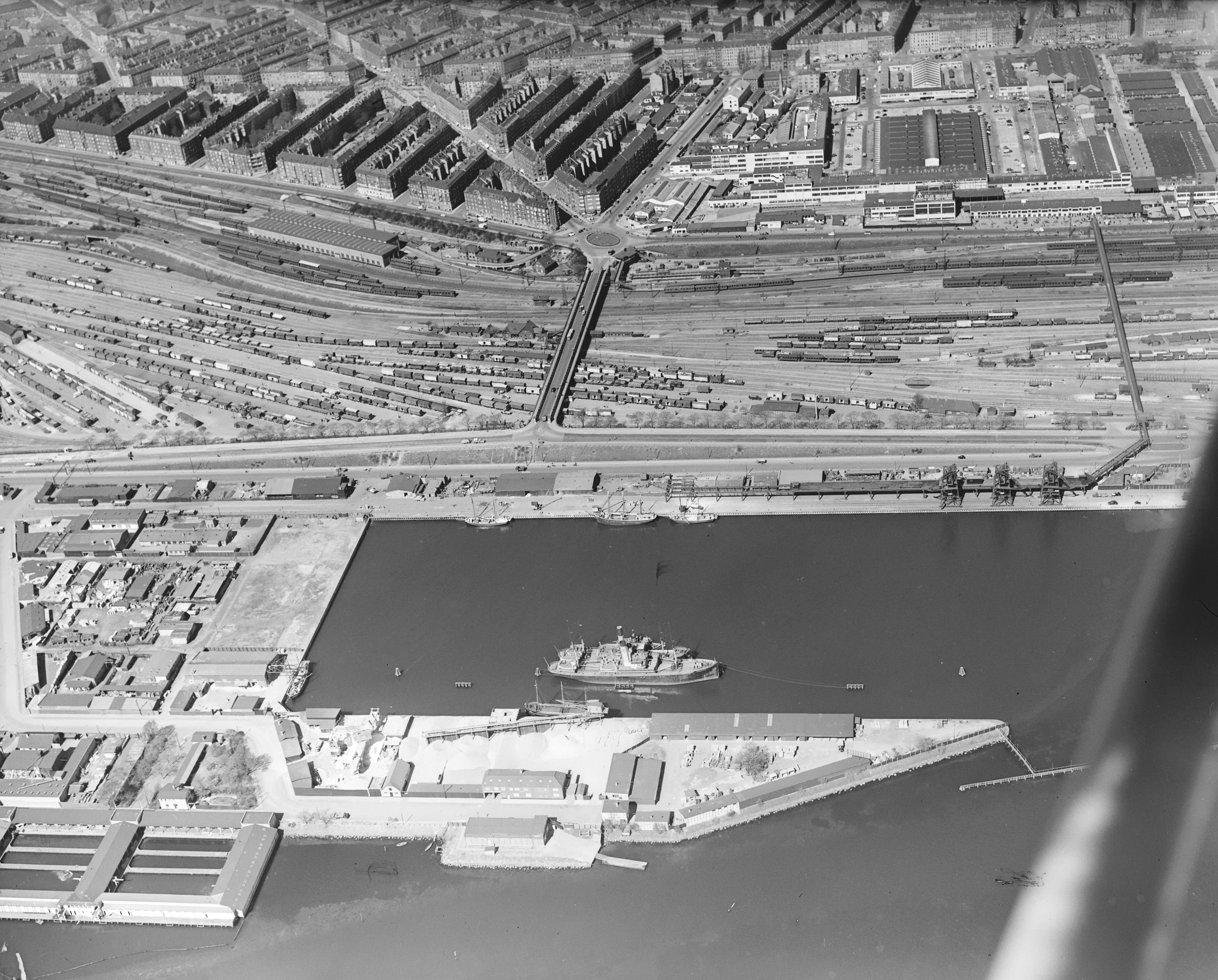
The industrial site depicted in 1953

The area was formerly known as Kalvebod Pladsvej and was an industrial site. The plan for its redevelopment was adopted by the City in 2003. A masterplan for the area was created by Gert Wingårdh and construction began in 2006.

The development comprises about 91,000 square metres of buildings. It consists of a mixture of housing, offices and a hotel.

== Buildings ==
The Havneholmen Housing Estate was built by Sjælsø Group between 2005 and 2009. It was designed by Lundgaard & Tranberg and received the RIBA European Award in 2001. Another residential project, consisting of 148 apartments distributed on four buildings in a fan-like arrangement perpendicular to the water, is designed by Vilhelm Lauritzen Arkitekter.

Aller House is the headquarters of Aller Media and was designed by PLH Arkitekter.

376-room Hotel Copenhagen Island is located on its own island. It was designed by Kim Utzon for the Arp-Hansen Hotel Group. Havneholmen Atrium and Havneholmen Towers were designed by Wingårdh.

== Notable people ==
A number of footballers from F.C. Copenhagen and Brøndby IF have lived on Havneholmen.

== Transport ==
=== Public transport ===
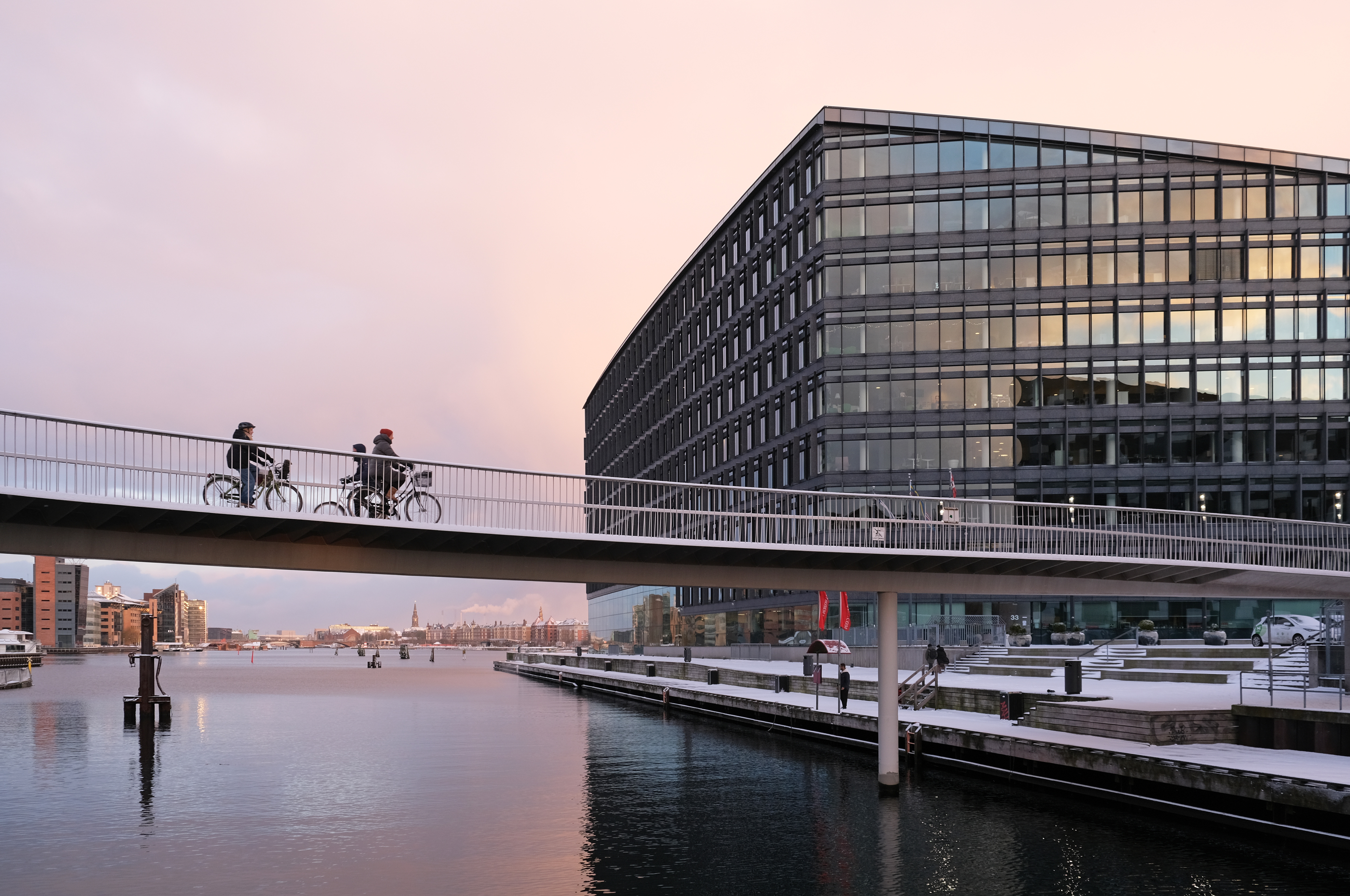
The Cykelslangen bicycle ramp

There is Havneholmen station on the M4 line nearby, opened in 2024. The nearest S-train station is Dybbølsbro station. The station is served by the A, B, C, E and H trains. Nearby bus lines include 1A which travels along Ingerslevsgade on the other side of the railway tracks on its way to Kongens Nytorv.

=== Cycling ===
The super bikeway Søruten ("The Lake Route") connects Havneholmen and the Brygge Bridge to Østerbrogade along the west side of The Lakes. On the other side of the harbor (Islands Brygge), the Lake Route connects to Universitetsruten ("University Route") and Havneruten ("Harbour Route"), which continues to University of Copenhagen's Søndre Campus and along the harbourfront respectively.

The new bicycle bridge Cykelslangen, opened at Havneholmen in 2014 to ensure fast and unhindered passage between the Brygge Bridge and Dybbøl Bridge in spite of the grade difference. The structure was designed by Dissing + Weitling.

== Image gallery ==
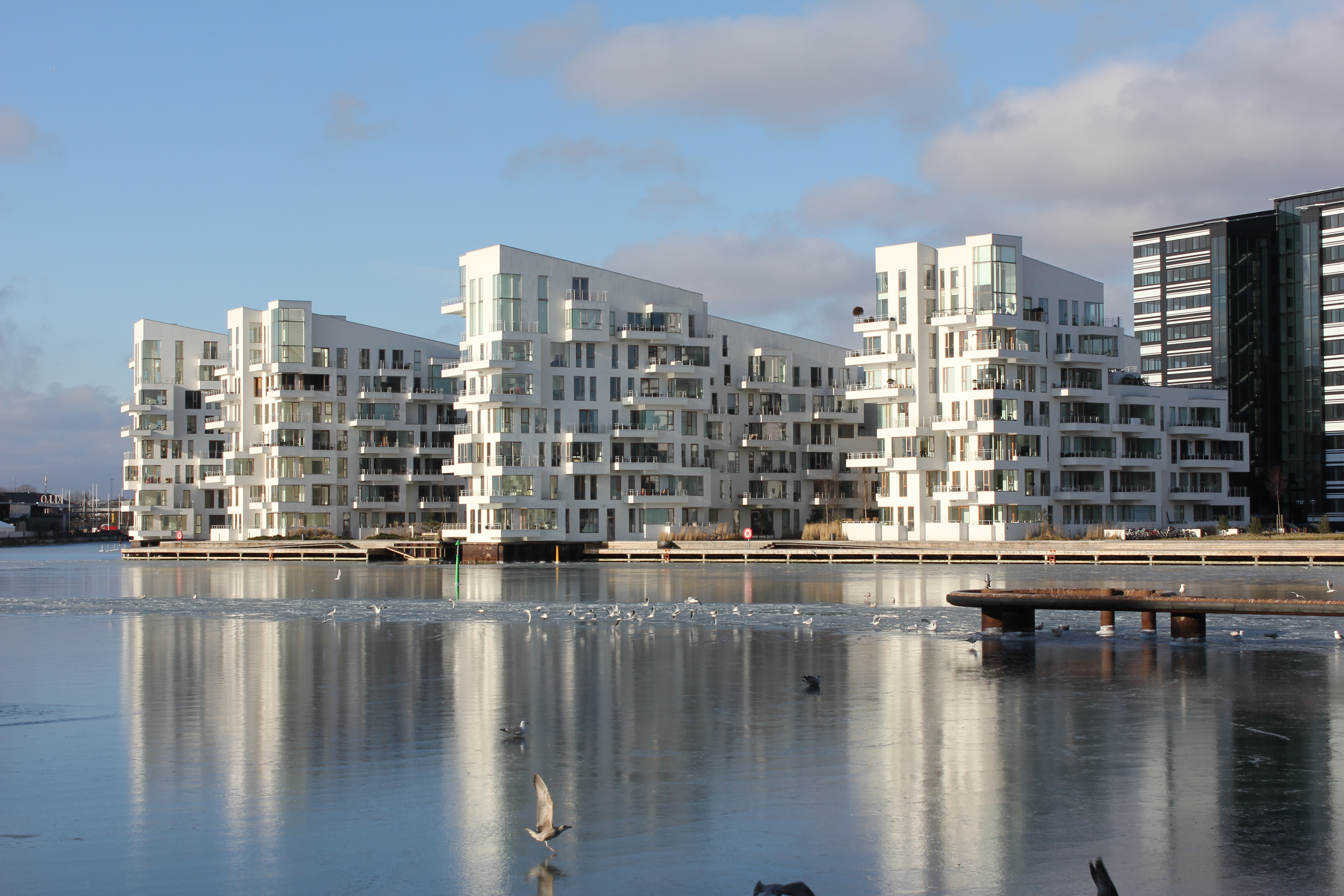
Havneholmen Housing Estate

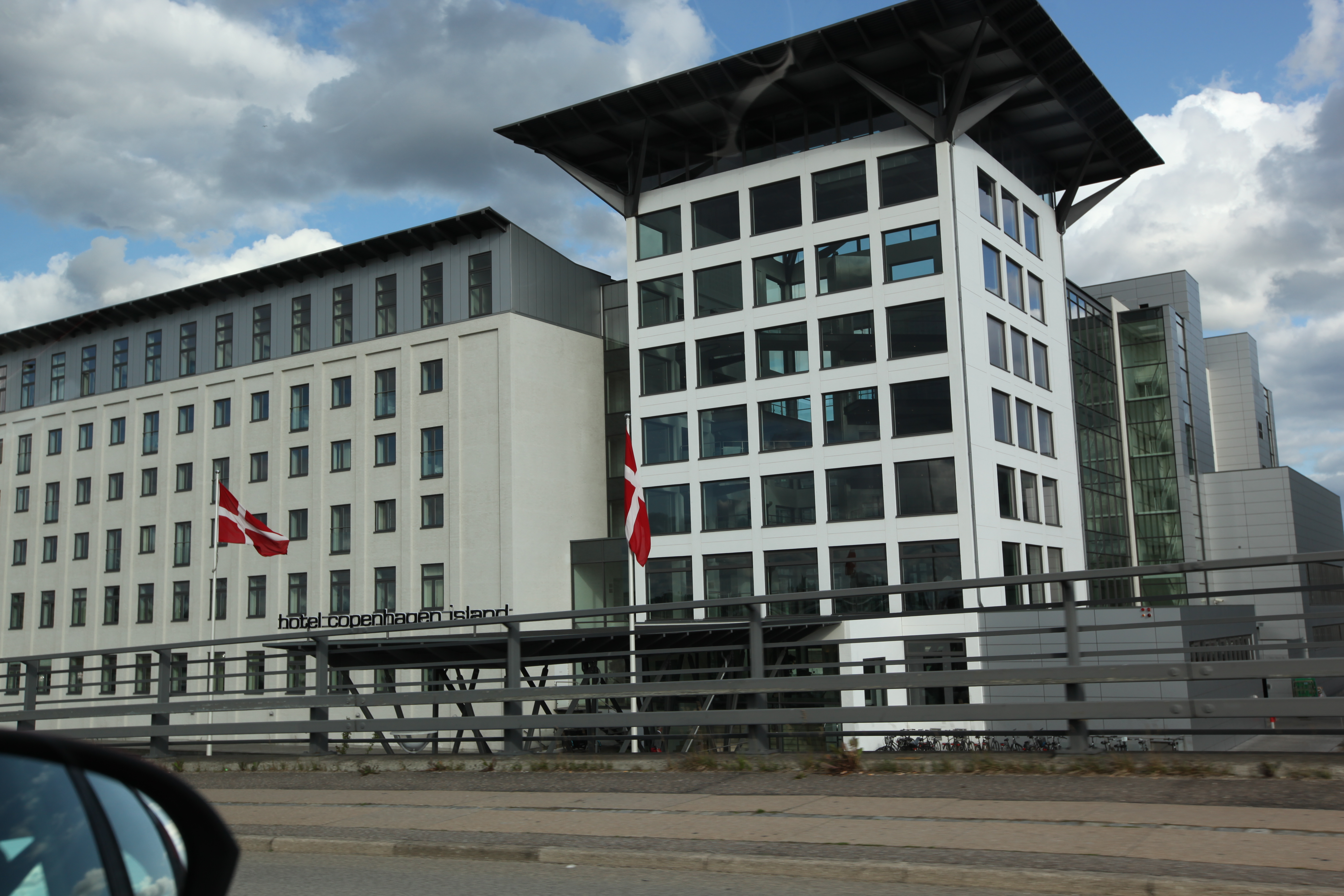
Hotel Copenhagen Island

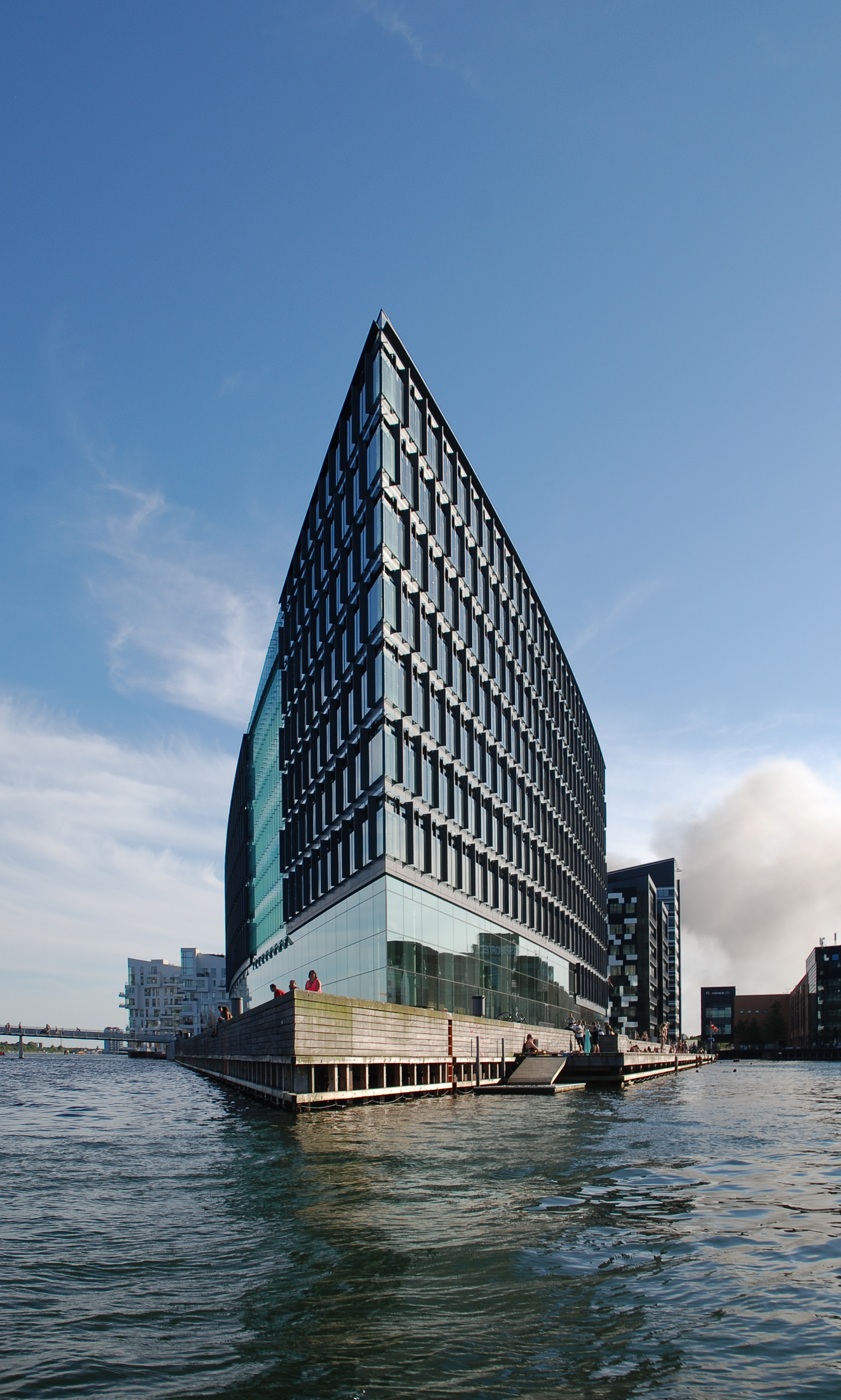
Aller House

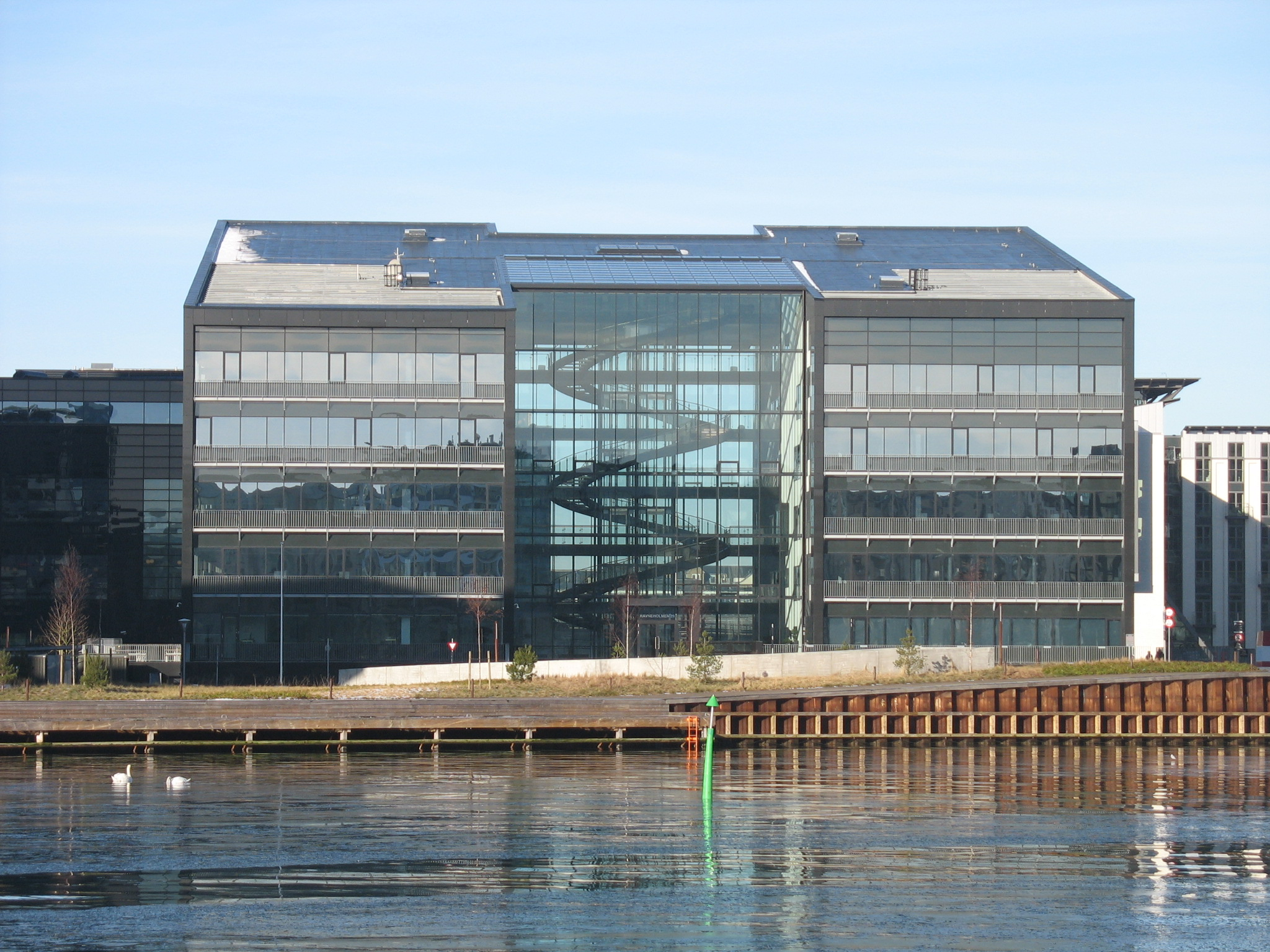
Havneholmen Atrium
