= The Love Sick =

1916 painting by George Grosz

- Artist: George Grosz
- Year: 1916
- Medium: oil on canvas
- Dimensions: 99.7 cm × 76.5 cm (39.3 in × 30.1 in)
- Location: Kunstsammlung Nordrhein-Westfalen; Düsseldorf

The Love Sick (German: Der Liebeskranke) is an oil on canvas painting by the German expressionist painter George Grosz, executed in 1916. The unsigned work is held at the Kunstsammlung Nordrhein-Westfalen, in Düsseldorf. It was bought from the New York gallery owner Richard L. Feigen, in 1979.

== Context ==
Grosz, after serving in the German Army since 1914, would be dismissed on 11 May 1915, for medical reasons. He worked frantically from July 1915 until January 1917, when he was drafted for service, in his workshop and home located in Berlin, at the Stephanstrasse. In a protest against the anti-English attitude of his compatriots, he joined the Spartacist League (predecessor of the German Communist Party) and anglicized his name from Georg Groß to the English George Grosz.

After having produced two interior paintings of a café (Das Kaffeehaus (1915/1916) and Café (1916)), the painter then created The Love Sick simultaneously and in a direct link with Suicide (Tate Gallery, London), where he also depicts himself, dead from a gunshot. The two works have the same dimension (99.7 × 76.5 cm) and are a sort of pendant.

== Analysis ==
The work is a self-portrait of the artist, designated as "Count Ehrenfried" (Grosz's middle name), who appears dressed in a dandy costume, while seated at the literary café Großenwahn (free translation: Delusion of Grandeur), in Berlin, who was one of the meeting points of the Expressionist artists in the German capital. In The Love Sick, one of his first oil paintings, Grosz not only depicts his own autobiographical and socio-political situation, but also draws inspiration from several artistic movements of his time. With plunging perspectives, distortion of proportions and caricatural exaggerations of physiognomy, he follows the German Expressionism style, similarly to Ernst Ludwig Kirchner and Erich Heckel. The accentuation of light and the dynamics of the representation of space seem to allude to Italian Futurism and at the same time thwart the euphoria of the metropolis and the pious vision of the technology of the future. Grosz also refers to cubism depicting a typical pedestal table, and a still life with glass, bottle and pipe, usually portrayed in many of the works of Pablo Picasso, Georges Braque and Juan Gris.

Wieland Herzfelde wrote about one of his encounters with the painter: “He was sitting alone at a table the top of which was a round marble. I recognized him immediately, although he looked very different to me. (...) He was sitting there, powdery white with red lips in a chocolate brown suit, between his knees a slender black cane." Grosz loved eccentricity and would stage himself in his evening appearances where he sang, danced and satirized. He spent most of his evenings in cafes staring at passers-by and annoying them with his mysterious appearance. Grosz reprised his roles in The Love Sick self-portrait, most notably that of Count Ehrenfried, a nonchalant aristocrat with clean nails.

The painting is conceived as an expression of an apocalyptic vision. The entire presentation of the painting is full of various symbols of vanities. What the painter depicted on the round table in the foreground and the pistol are modern variations of it. The skeleton in the background is the doppelganger of the loving man and finds, and this is Grosz sarcasm, its equivalent in the fishbone. The dog whose head is close to the crossbones recalls the skull present in the vanities. With his poor appearance and poisoned bluish fur, he became the main character in this cafe scene. While the dog was traditionally the symbol of loyalty and friendship in art, Grosz uses it as a symbol of melancholy, another image of the animal, first used by Albrecht Dürer in his engraving Melencolia I.

The atmosphere of an apocalyptic disaster is complemented by the burning houses in the background. The original date of the painting, which is 1916, indicates that the meaning of these symbols is clear, since Europe is in the middle of the First World War.
