= Cykelslangen =

The Bicycle Snake
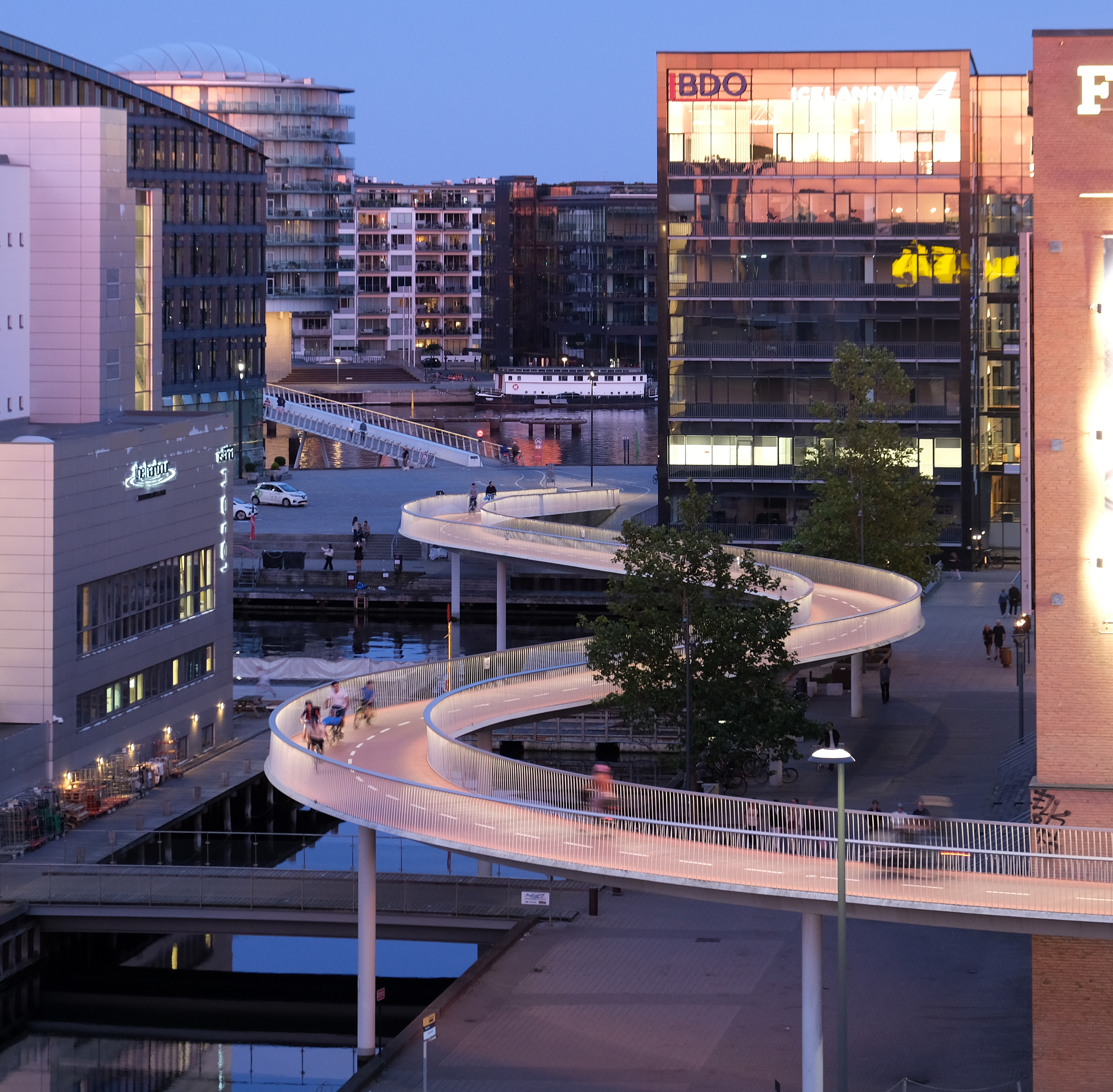
- Coordinates: 55°39′45″N 12°33′49″E
- Carries: Bicycle traffic
- Crosses: Gasværkshavnen
- Locale: Havneholmen
- Official name: Cykelslangen

Characteristics
- Total length: 220 metres (720 ft)
- Width: 4.6 metres (15 ft)
- Clearance below: 7 metres (23 ft)

History
- Designer: Dissing+Weitling
- Opened: 28 June 2014

Location
- Interactive map of The Bicycle Snake

Cykelslangen (lit. 'The Bicycle Snake') is a bridge for bicyclists in Copenhagen. It is 220-metre (720 ft) long, crossing Gasværkshavnen from Kalvebod Brygge in the west to Havneholmen to the east.

The name of Cykelslangen comes from the Danish word for a bike hose, along with the snake-like structure of the bridge.

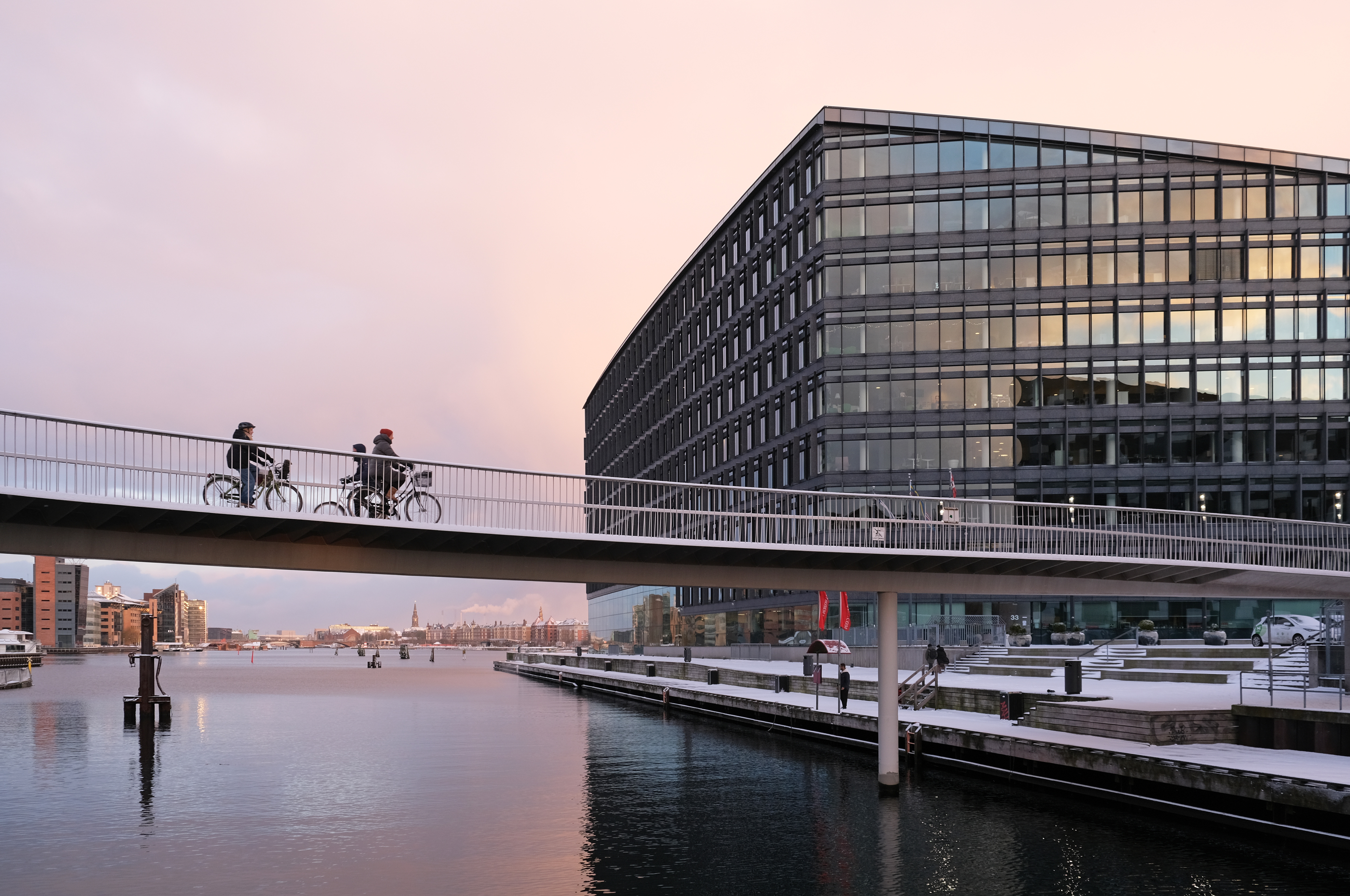
Cykelslangen, 2026

The bridge was designed by Dissing+Weitling and opened to the public on 28 June 2014. The project cost 32 million Danish krone ($5.74 million).

== Literature ==
- Munk Beilin, Sarah; Dahl, Ellen; Brams, Rikke. Guide to New Architecture in Copenhagen. Copenhagen: Danish Architecture Center. p. 123. ISBN 978-87-90668-71-6.
