= Kunstsammlung Nordrhein-Westfalen =

Art collection of the German state of North Rhine-Westphalia

Coordinates: 51°13′38″N 6°46′32″E

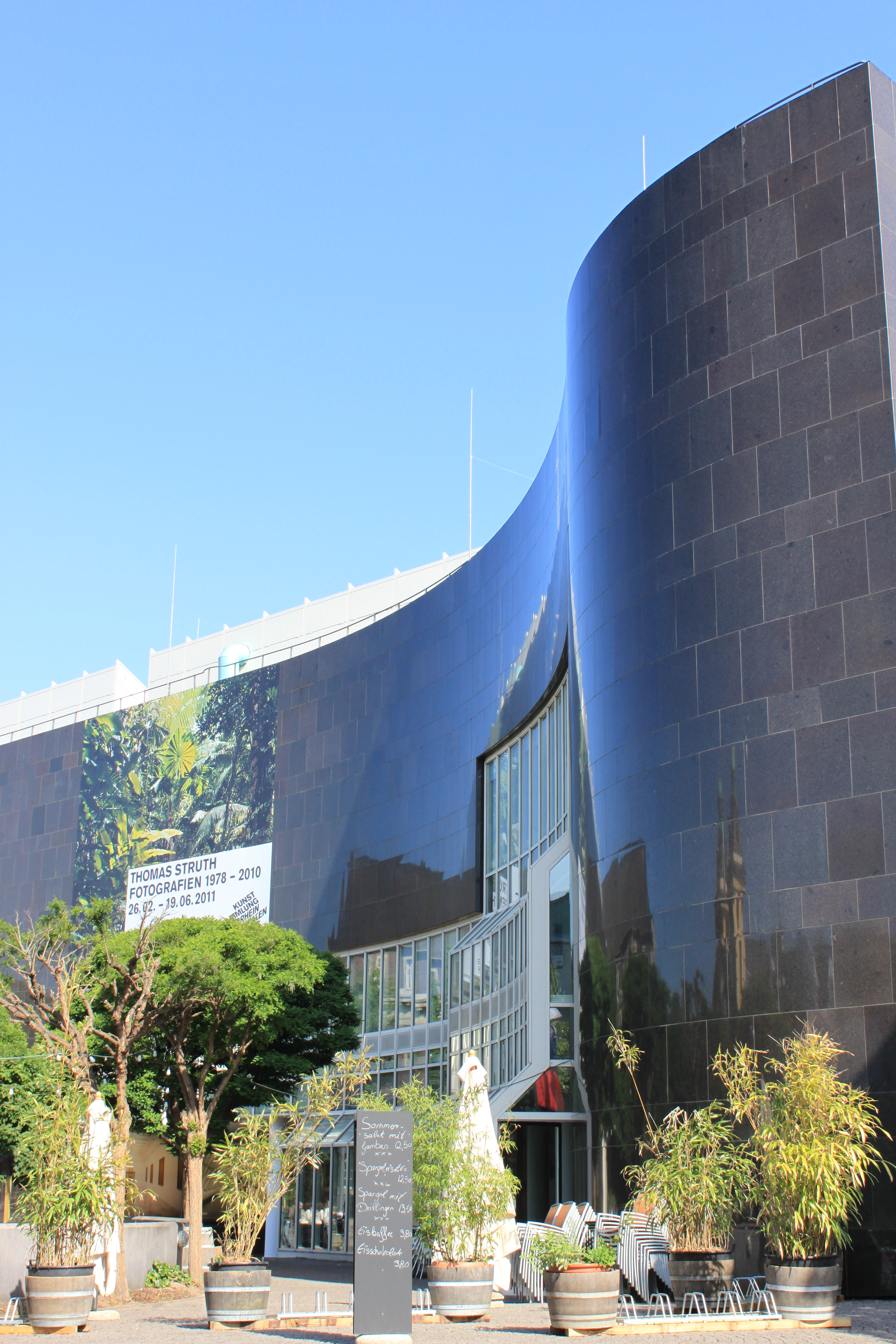
K20 Grabbeplatz

Kunstsammlung Nordrhein-Westfalen, Düsseldorf, North Rhine-Westphalia

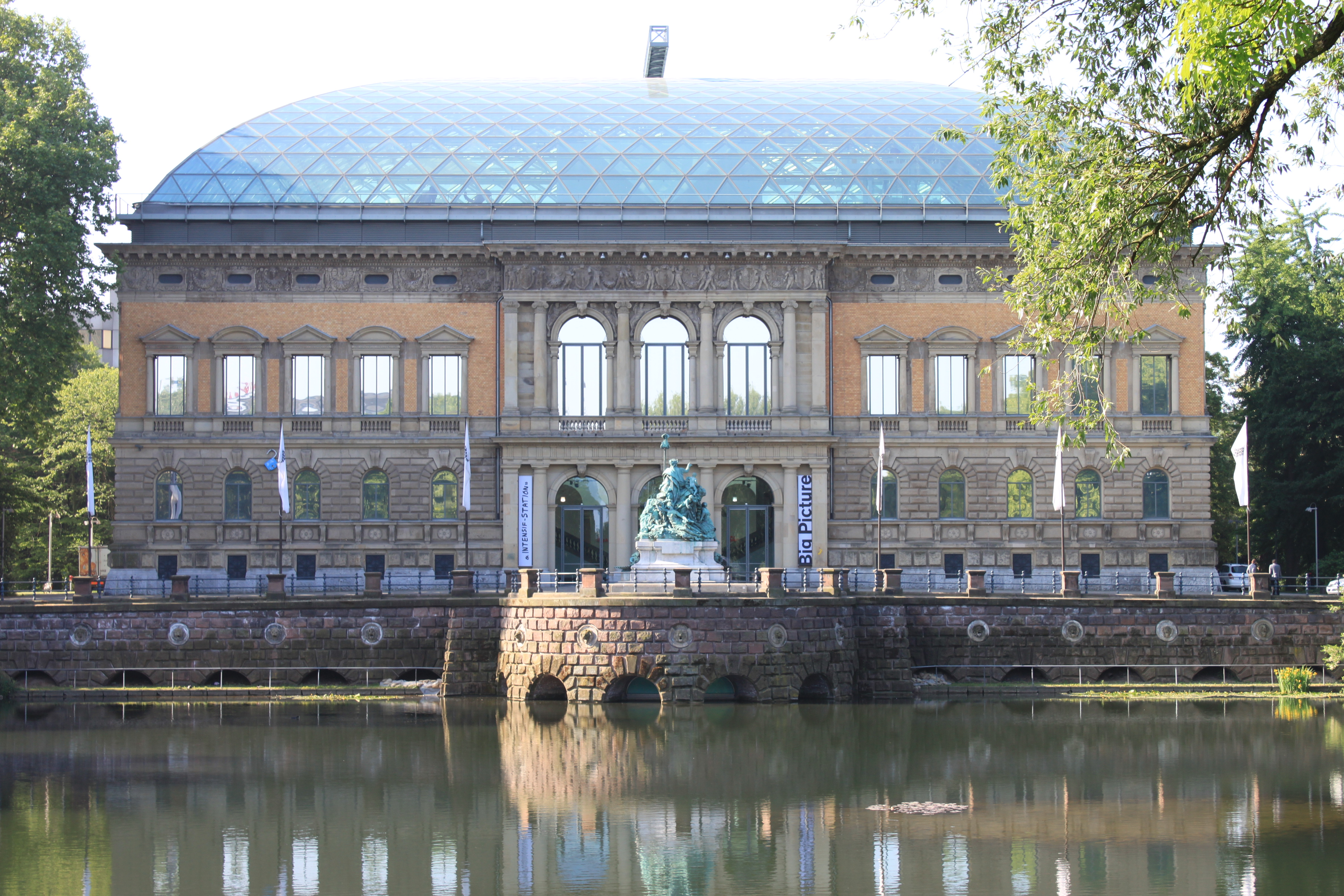
K21 Ständehaus

The Kunstsammlung Nordrhein-Westfalen is the art collection of the German Federal State of North Rhine-Westphalia, in Düsseldorf. United by this institution are three different exhibition venues: the K20 at Grabbeplatz, the K21 in the Ständehaus, and the Schmela Haus. The Kunstsammlung was founded in 1961 by the state government of North Rhine-Westphalia as a foundation under private law for the purpose of displaying the art collection and expanding it through new acquisitions.

During its 50-year history, the Kunstsammlung Nordrhein-Westfalen has earned an international reputation as a museum for the art of the 20th century. For some time now, however, the chronological spectrum of the collection—which was initiated through the purchase of works by Paul Klee—has extended up to the immediate present. The building at Grabbeplatz (K20), with its characteristic black granite façade, was inaugurated in 1986. An extension building was completed in 2010.

With major works by Pablo Picasso, Henri Matisse, and Piet Mondrian, among others, as well as a wide-ranging ensemble of circa 100 drawings and paintings by Paul Klee, the permanent collection of the Kunstsammlung offers a singular perspective of classical modernism. The collection of postwar American art includes works by Jackson Pollock and Frank Stella and by pop artists Robert Rauschenberg, Jasper Johns, and Andy Warhol; other high points of the collection are works by Joseph Beuys, Gerhard Richter, Tony Cragg, Emil Schumacher, Sarah Morris, Katharina Fritsch, Nam June Paik, Wolf Vostell and Imi Knoebel.

Opened in spring of 2002 as an additional venue of the Kunstsammlung was the Ständehaus (K21) set alongside the Kaiserteich, a building which formerly served as the seat of the Parliament of North Rhine-Westphalia. Among the highlights on view there are a number of artist's rooms and large-scale installations, a special focus of this portion of the collection.

The Schmela Haus, in Düsseldorf's historic district, joined the Kunstsammlung in 2009 as a "rehearsal stage" and lecture venue. When it first opened in 1971, this protected landmark by Dutch architect Aldo van Eyck was home to the Galerie Alfred Schmela and was the first building to be erected in the Federal Republic of Germany expressly as an art gallery. Since spring of 2011, the Schmela Haus is also used again for exhibitions.

As an institution with three locations, the Kunstsammlung has more than 10,000 m^{2} (110,000 sq ft) of exhibition surface at its disposal.

With its accompanying programs and special projects, the Education Department strives to make the works held in the Regional Collection accessible to visitors of all ages. Available for this purpose are a number of studios, a media workshop, and a "laboratory" which is integrated into the exhibition galleries.

== History ==
The history of the Kunstsammlung Nordrhein-Westfalen begins in 1960 with the purchase of 88 works by Paul Klee from the collection of Pittsburgh steel manufacturer G. David Thompson. The purchase—brokered by Basel art dealer Ernst Beyeler and overseen by then state premiere Franz Meyer—forms the nucleus of the collection, founded in 1961 under the title "Stiftung Kunstsammlung Nordrhein-Westfalen". Between 1962 and his retirement in 1990, Werner Schmalenbach served as the first director of the newly founded collection. He assembled an extraordinarily high-quality collection of classical modernist artworks, thereby creating the only regional collection in Germany specializing in modern art. To begin with, the collection was housed in Jägerhof Palace. Soon after it opened, space limitations prompted plans for a new building. Announced in 1975 was a competition for its design; the winning proposal was submitted by the Danish architectural office of Dissing+Weitling. The building – which resides within architectural history at the transition from postwar modernism to postmodernism – was inaugurated on 14 March 1986 in the presence of the then German President Richard von Weizsäcker, and has served ever since as an emblem of the city. With its curved façade of polished, natural black stone, the building gives Grabbeplatz its special character. It sits on the square directly across from the Kunsthalle Düsseldorf, whose building also serves as the headquarters of the Kunstverein für die Rheinlande und Westfalen.

In 1990, Schmalenbach was succeeded as Director by Armin Zweite, formerly head of the Städtische Galerie im Lenbachhaus in Munich. While Schmalenbach had expanded the museum's holdings for the most part through the addition of masterworks of painting, it was primarily contemporary sculptures, installations, and photographs of international rank which entered the collection beginning in 1990 through the efforts of his successor. On 1 September 2009, Marion Ackermann – former director of the Kunstmuseum Stuttgart – assumed artistic directorship of the Kunstsammlung Nordrhein-Westfalen. She has taken a dynamic approach to the collection, and seeks to relate contemporary art and classic modern to one another more closely. Together with Hagen Lippe-Weißenfeld, who joined the team on 1 November 2008 as Director of Finance and Business Affairs, Ackermann serves on the Chairmanship of the Foundation.

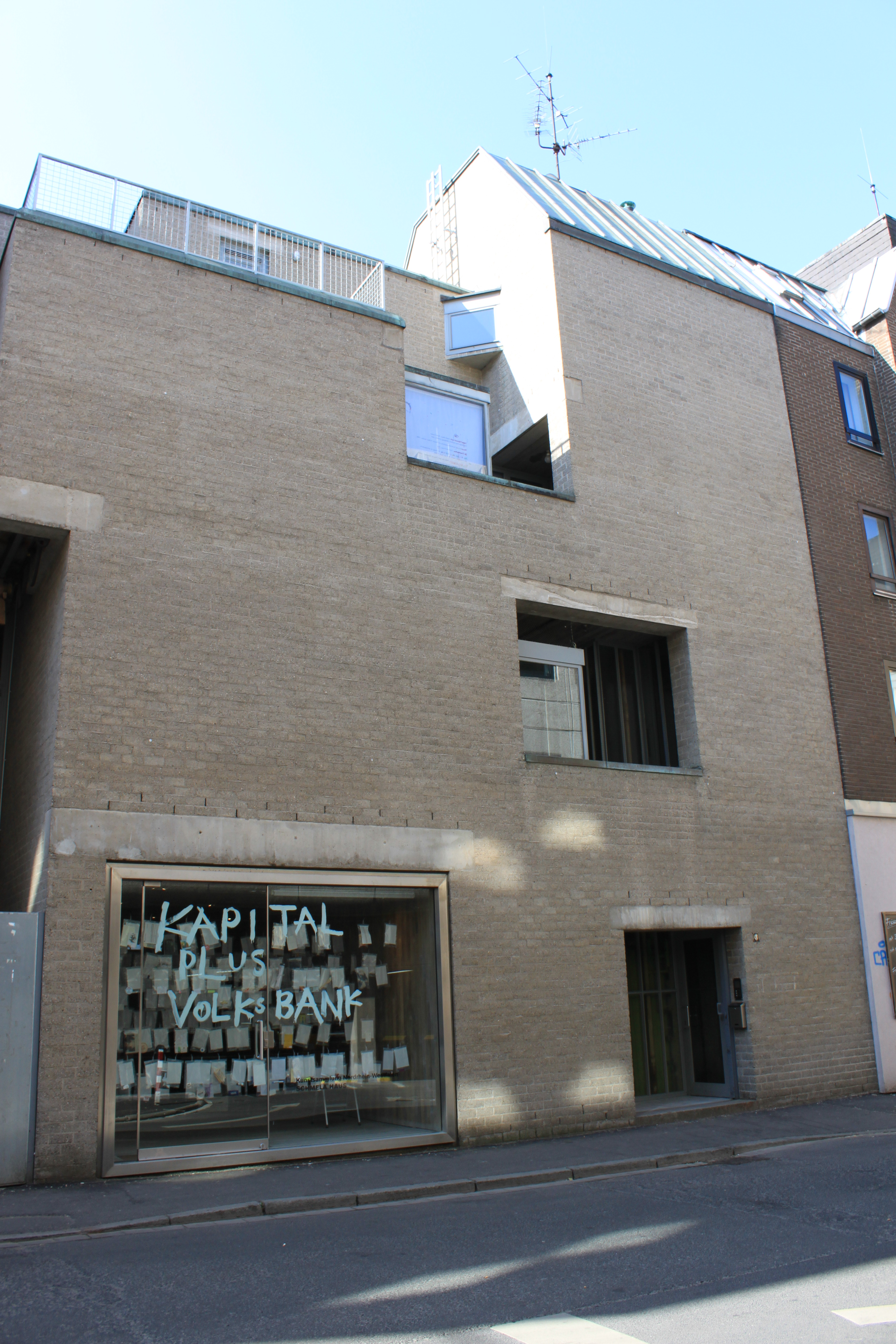
Schmela Haus

On 12 November 2009, the Kunstsammlung inaugurated the former home of the Galerie Schmela, located at Mutter-Ey-Straße 3 in Düsseldorf-Altstadt, as a venue for exhibitions, discussions and other activities.

After remaining closed for more than two years during comprehensive renovations and the erection of an extension building, the K20 at Grabbeplatz resumed operations as an exhibition venue in July 2010. Available now for the collection and for temporary exhibitions is a generous surface area. The first artists to exhibit there were Belgian illustrator Kris Martin and German sculptor Michael Sailstorfer, who created accessible installations for the two galleries of the new building, namely the Klee Halle and the Konrad und Gabriele Henkel Galerie, which together offer almost 2,000 m^{2}.

During the first two weeks after the reopening alone, nearly 60,000 visitors took advantage of free admission to the Kunstsammlung. The museum welcomed its 100,000th visitor on 21 October 2010. Contributing to the new public presence of the Kunstsammlung – which is now able to display the art collections of this federal state more comprehensively than ever before – is the large-scale mosaic mural "Hornet", composed of colorful tiles and the work of American artist Sarah Morris. With its length of 27 meters, it has become a landmark on the newly created Paul Klee Platz along the rear façade of the K20.

Logo Kunstsammlung Nordrhein-Westfalen

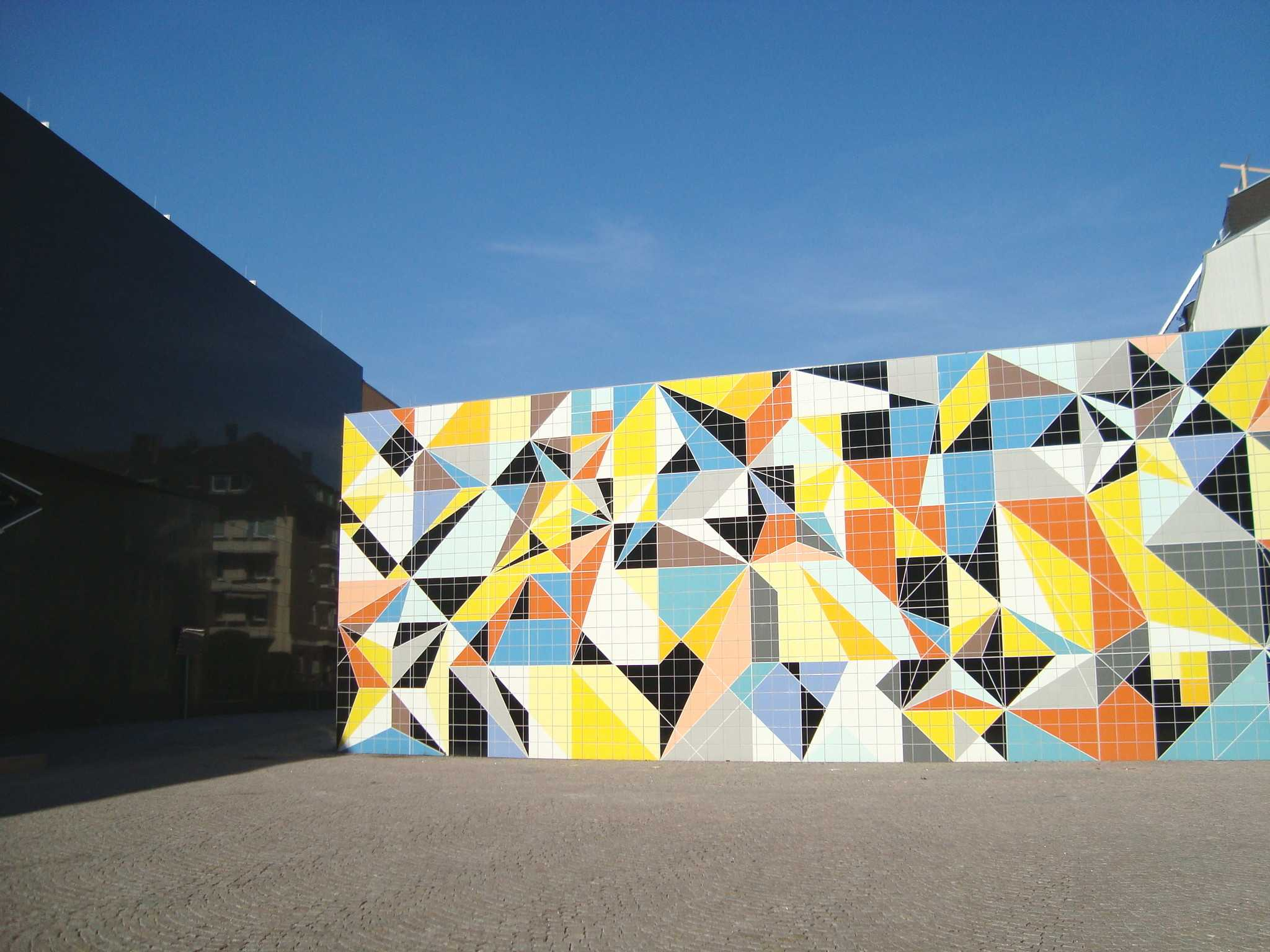
Hornet by Sarah Morris, 2010, Paul-Klee-Platz, K20 Grabbeplatz

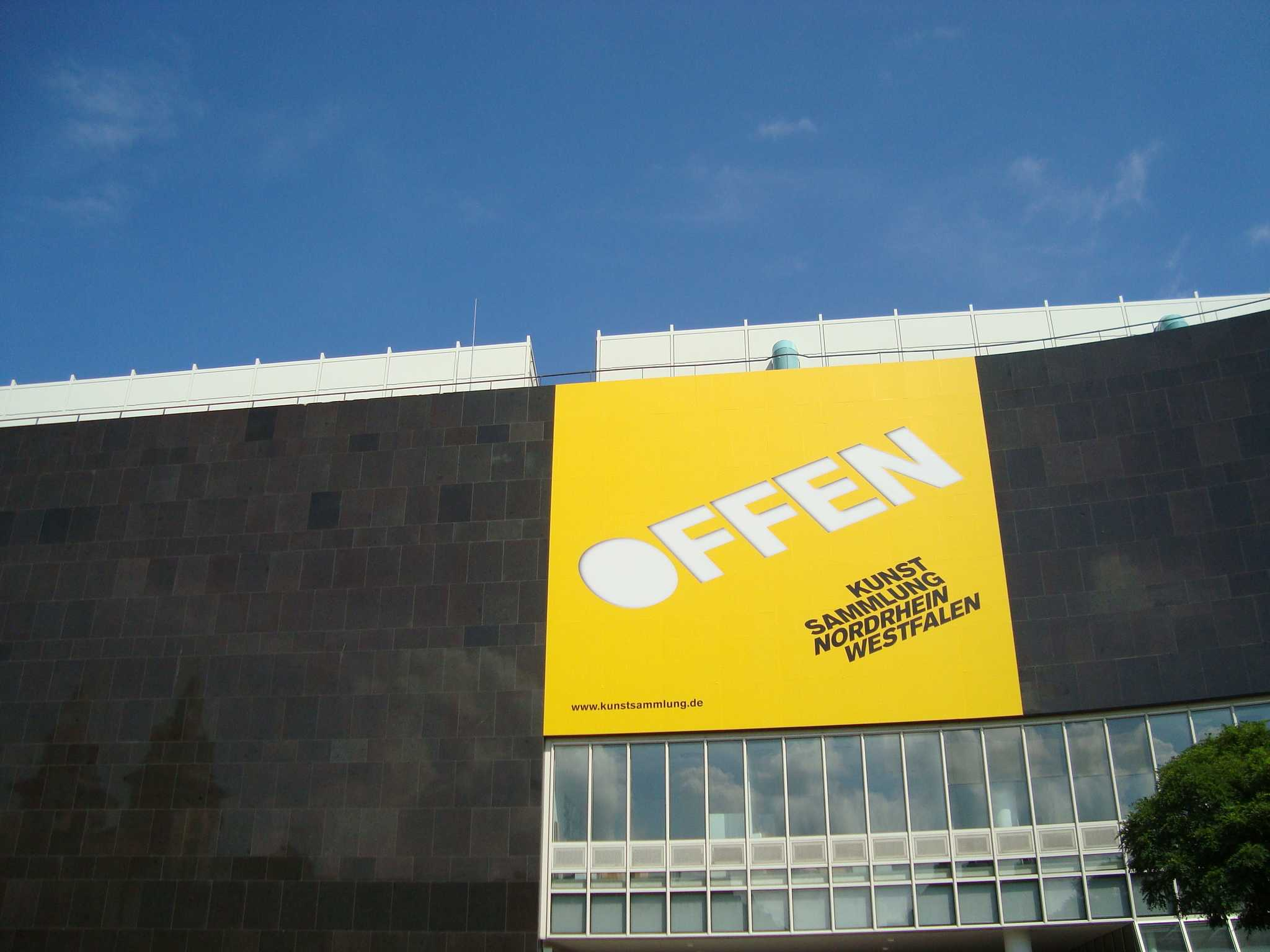
Reopening of the Kunstsammlung, 2010, K20 Grabbeplatz

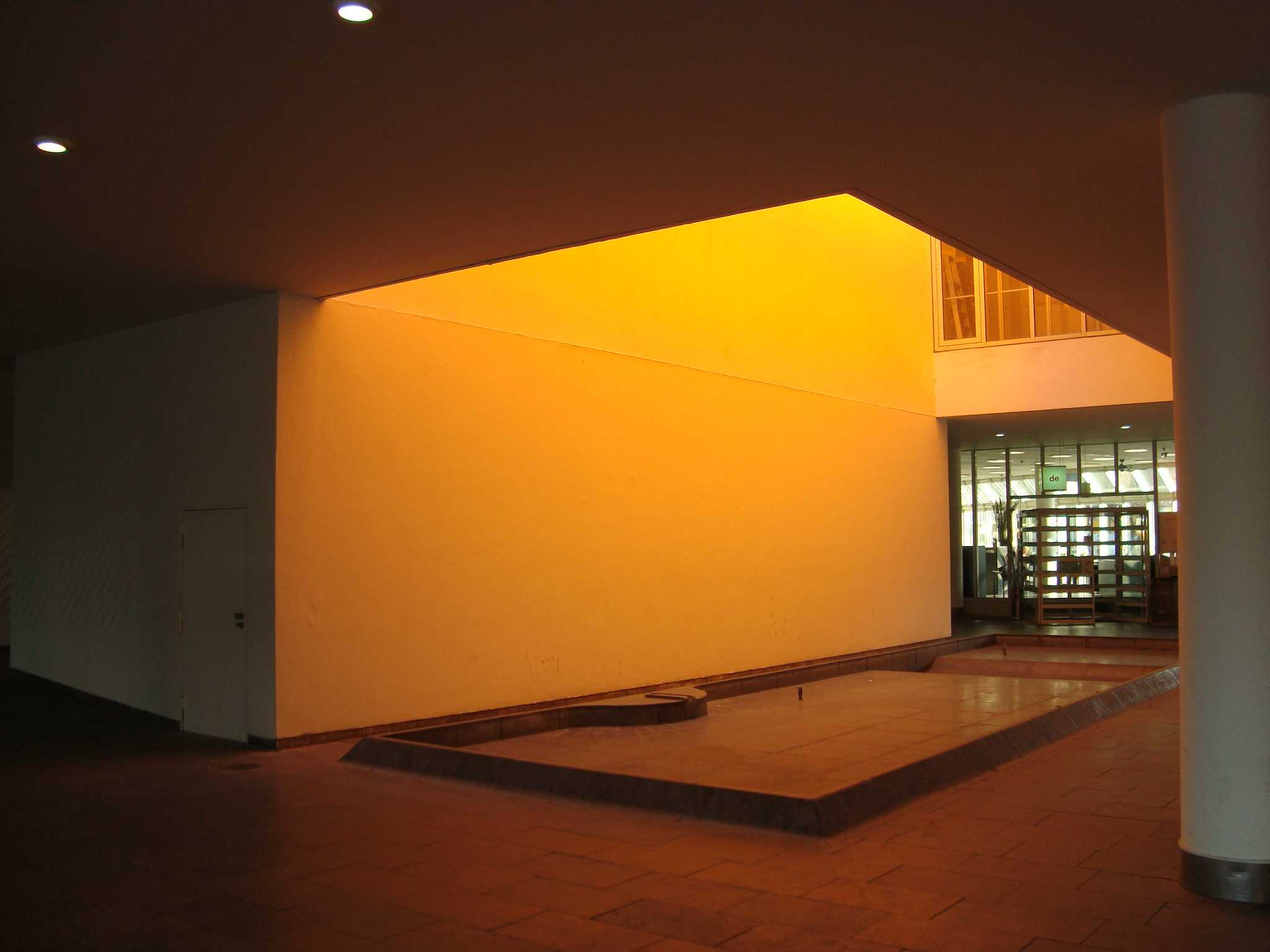
Your natural yellow daylight by Olafur Eliasson, 2010, K20 Grabbeplatz

Featured on a regular basis in the venues of the Kunstsammlung Nordrhein-Westfalen alongside presentations of the permanent collection are internationally acclaimed temporary exhibitions.

On view from 11 September 2010 to 16 January 2011 in the K20 and the Schmela Haus was the ambitious Joseph Beuys exhibition "Parallelprozesse/Parallel Processes", organized around large-scale installation works dating from all creative periods of this artist. This exhibition – the first special presentation mounted after the reopening of the Kunstsammlung am Grabbeplatz – formed part of the program of the Düsseldorf Quadriennale, and was seen by 103,000 visitors.

== Architecture ==
=== The K20 am Grabbeplatz ===
The building which houses the Kunstsammlung K20 am Grabbeplatz, with its distinctive façade of black Bornholm granite, was opened in 1986. Working in the tradition of Arne Jacobsen, the Copenhagen architecture office of Dissing+Weitling created a building which features details typical of its time and positions the qualities of the artworks on display in the foreground.

The entrance area opens onto the Grabbe Halle on the same level, the building's tallest gallery space, which features 14-metre ceilings. Used for temporary exhibitions, this hall measures 600 m^{2} and is free of supporting pillars.

From the lobby, three single-flight staircases arranged one behind the next provide access to the two upper storeys. Like the galleries in the 2nd upper storey, the large hall in the 1st upper storey enjoys natural top lighting.

The foundation stone for the extension was laid in 2008 and the new building was inaugurated in July 2010. Realized by the same architectural office, the new building perpetuates the architectural idiom of the original structure. During the two-year-long period of closure, the original building was completely renovated and brought up to current technical standards.

Available now in the two new exhibition halls of the extension building – both free of supporting pillars – are altogether 2000 m^{2} of surface area. The Klee Halle is positioned on the right-hand side of the foyer of the old building, and is mainly used for temporary exhibitions. With a clearance space of 6.4 m, the hall is illuminated artificially by more than 500 spotlights. A narrow staircase in the rear connects the ground floor level with the new upper hall. The entire exhibition surface of the Kunstsammlung am Grabbeplatz now amounts to more than 5000 m^{2}.

=== The K21 in the Ständehaus ===
On 18 April 2002, the museum building known as the Ständehaus am Kaiserteich was inaugurated in the presence of German then President Johannes Rau, and became the second main pillar of the Kunstsammlung for modern and contemporary art.

Between 1876 and 1880, the Ständehaus in Düsseldorf was erected in the historicist neo-Renaissance style by architect Julius Raschdorff. For many years, the Ständehaus accommodated the Provincial Diet of the Prussian Rhine Province. The parliament (Landtag) of the state of North Rhine-Westphalia met there between 1949 and 1988. Following the relocation of the Parliament, the Ständehaus remained empty and unused for 14 years.

Surrounding the building's central public square – which takes the form of a spacious piazza – are four wings containing continuous arcade passageways. The three-year conversion of this representative building in the historicist style was undertaken by the architects Kiessler+Partner of Munich. They created a modern museum building with a striking glazed domed roof in the form of an elongated cloister vault, composed of 1919 sheets of glass, which shapes the building's aesthetic appearance.

While the outer façade has been preserved, nearly all original fixtures were removed from the interior. The historic staircase was retained, and now leads to the galleries in the three upper stories. The flexible exhibition galleries in the basement level, together with the upper rooms, add up to altogether 5300 m^{2} of exhibition surface.

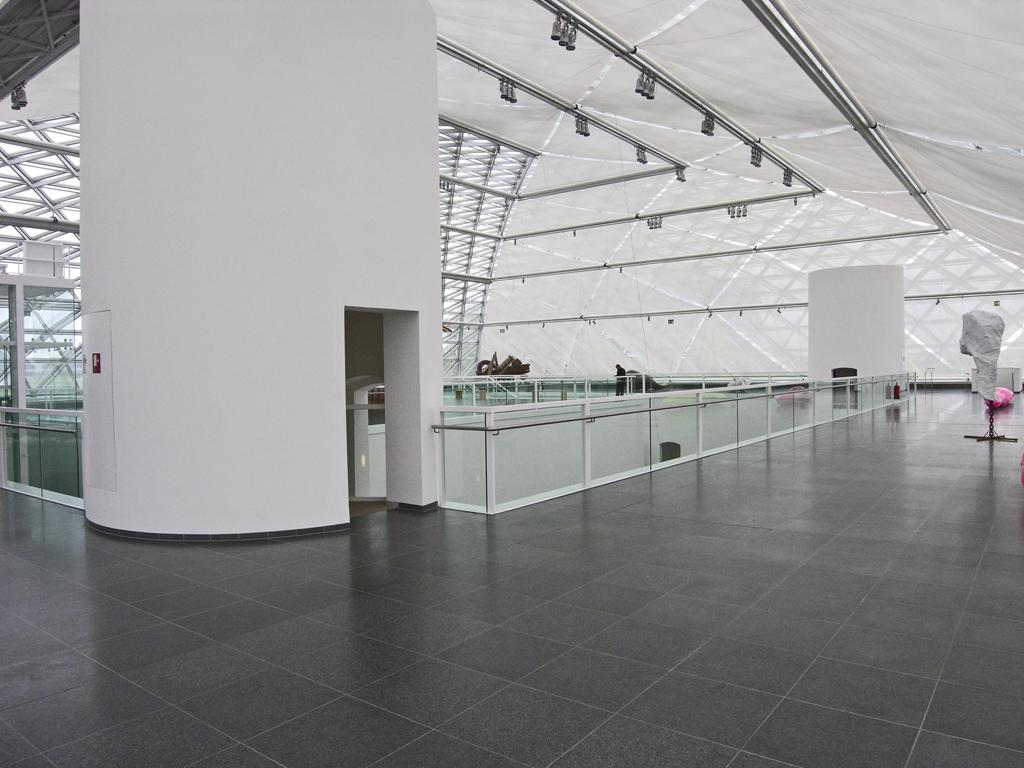
K21, top floor

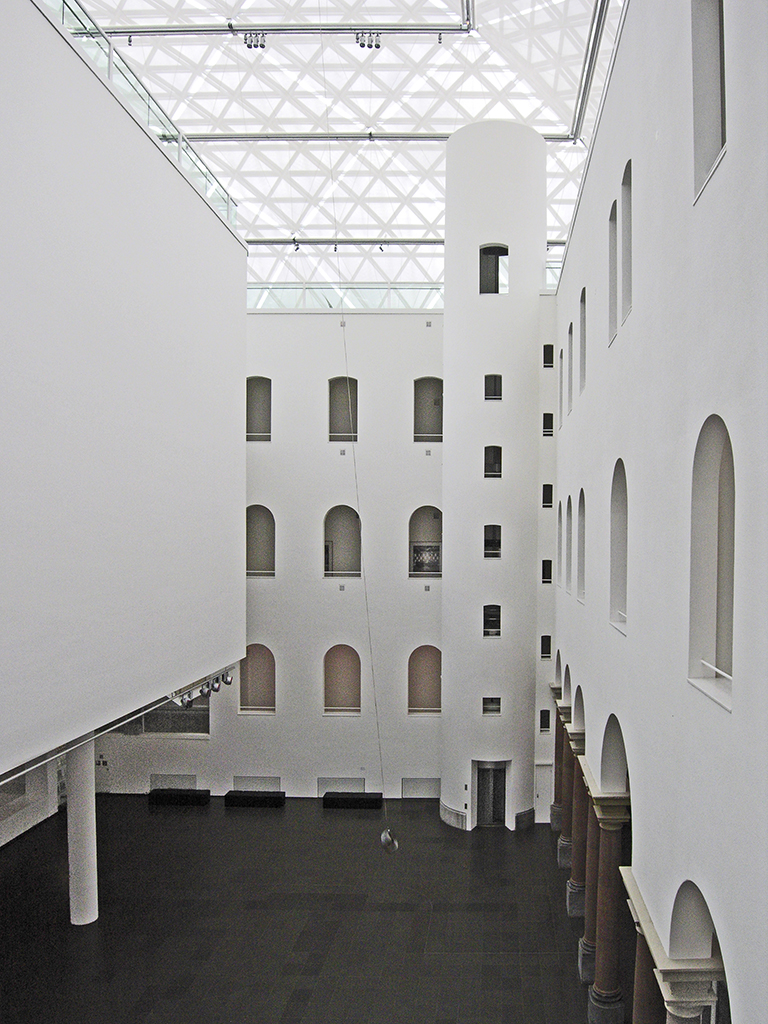
K21, foyer

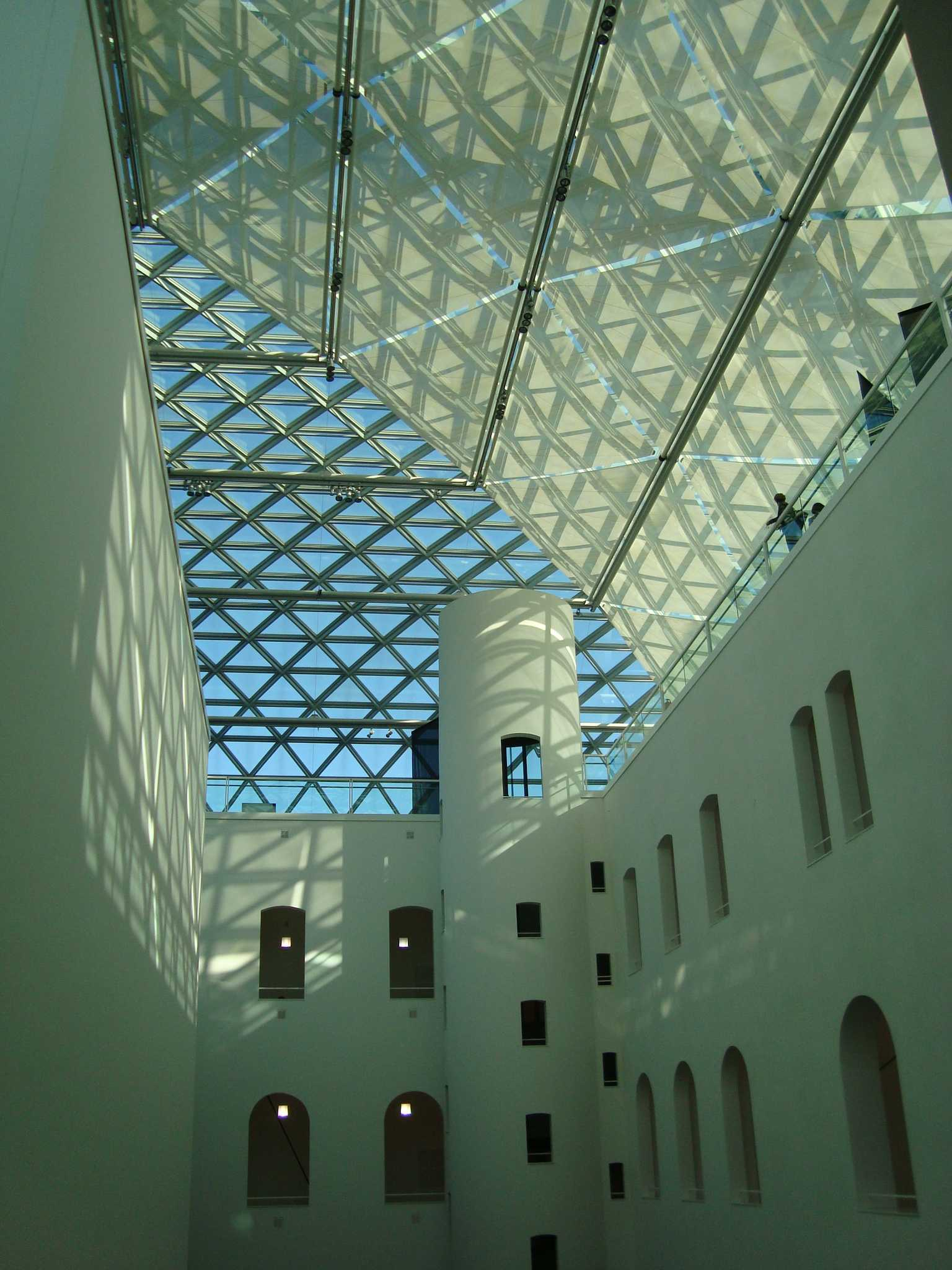
K21, interior view

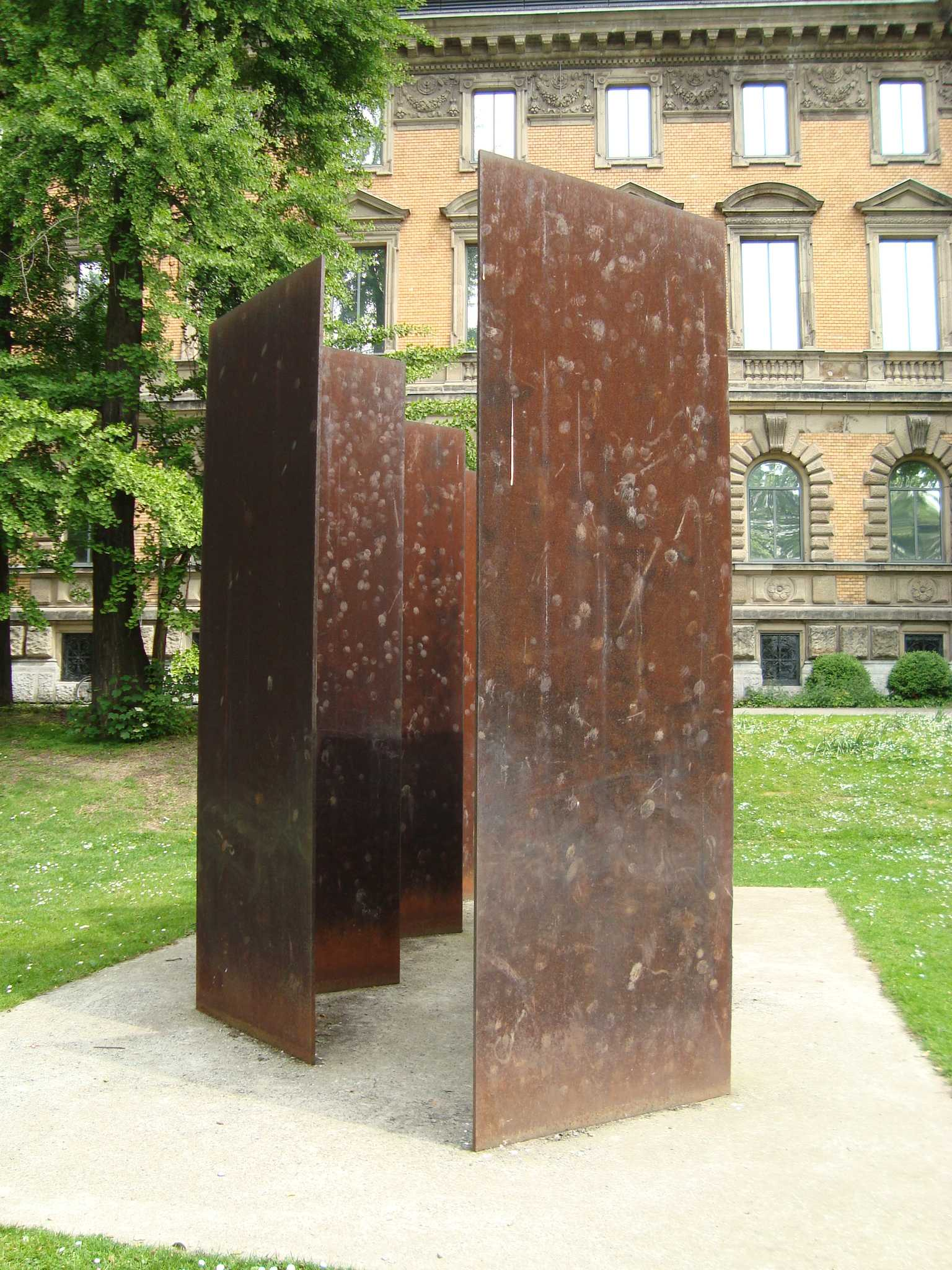
sculpture Zim Zum II by Barnett Newman at K21

=== The Schmela Haus ===
The Schmela Haus was built by Dutch architect Aldo van Eyck (1918–1999), a key representative of structuralist architecture. Inaugurated in 1971, and now under landmarks protection, it was the first building in the Federal German Republic to be erected specifically as a private art gallery. The five-story building, built from gray pumice, is characterized by its interplay of interior and exterior and between its private residential and public exhibition spaces. The building was purchased by the Federal State of North Rhine-Westphalia after being vacated by the gallery.

== Collection ==
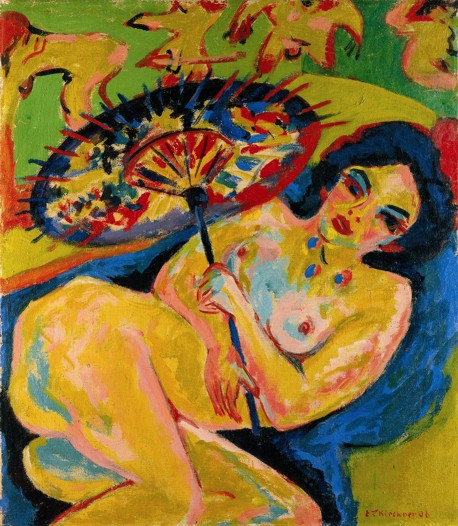
Ernst Ludwig Kirchner 1909, Mädchen unter Japanschirm

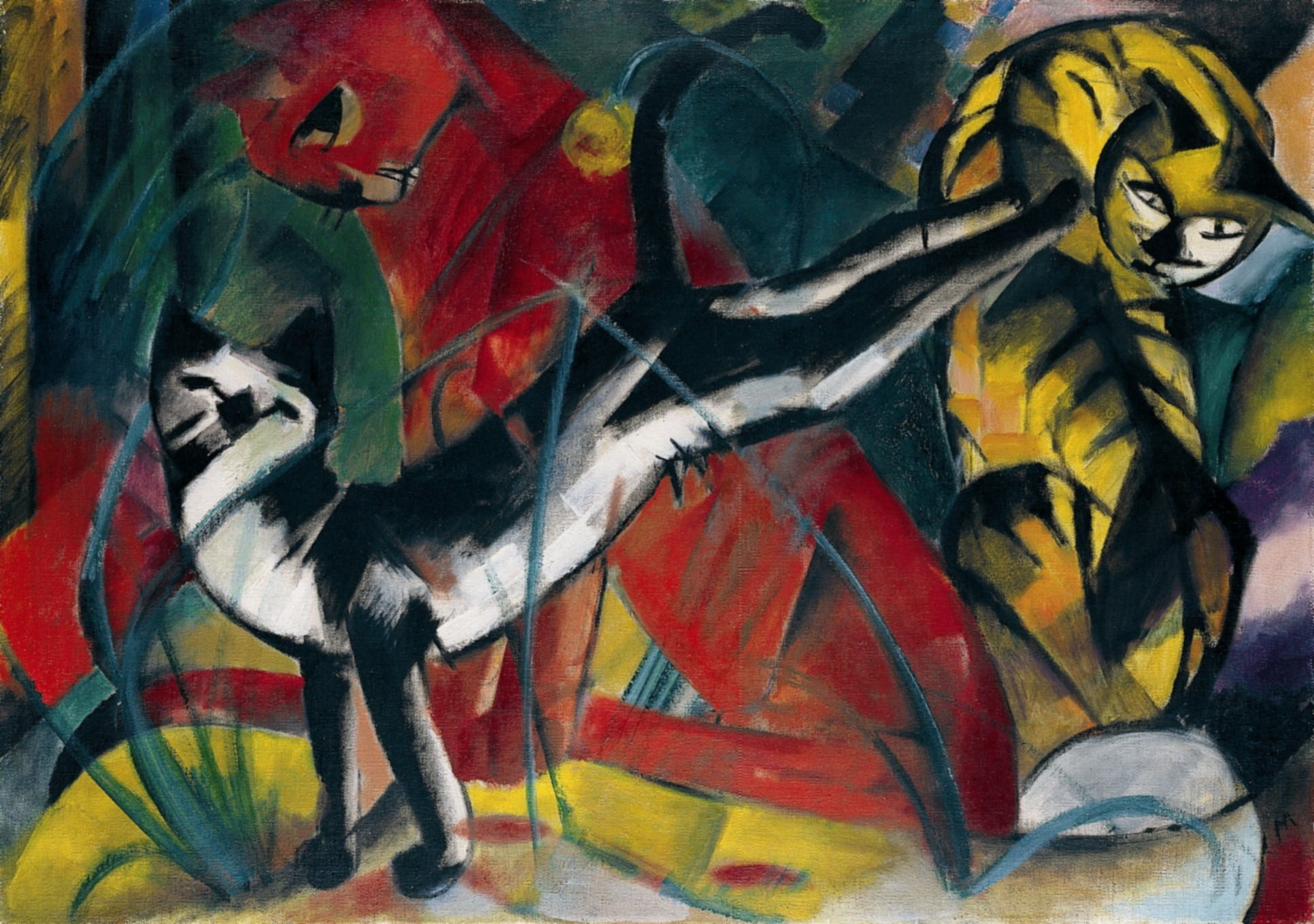
Franz Marc, c.1913, Drei Katzen

Joan Miró, 1919, Nu au miroir (Nude with a Mirror, Naakt met mirror)

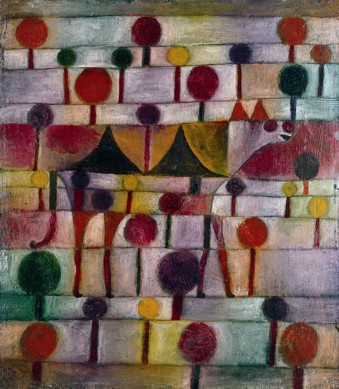
Paul Klee, 1920, Kamel in rhythmischer Baumlandschaft

The collection encompasses a singular selection of works from the 20th and 21st centuries. Among the high points are paintings by the German Expressionists, Pablo Picasso, Wassily Kandinsky and Jackson Pollock, and installations by Joseph Beuys and Nam June Paik. Alongside these works, which have long since achieved iconic status, are additional outstanding examples of classical modernism, of American art after 1945, along with major installation works, photographs, and film and video pieces by contemporary artists. Critics have referred to the collection – whose individual works are notable for their outstanding quality – as a "secret National Gallery".

The focus of the collection is classical modernism. Stylistically, the works from before 1945 range from Fauvism, Expressionism, Pittura Metafisica, and Cubism to works by members of the Blaue Reiter group, as well as Dada and Surrealism. The collection also includes 100 works by Paul Klee. In 1960, the Federal State of North Rhine-Westphalia earmarked 6 million German Marks for the purchase of 88 paintings, drawings, and color studies on paper by Klee – an ensemble which formed the nucleus of the Kunstsammlung Nordrhein-Westfalen. Although the price tag seemed high at the time, it appears a rare bargain from today's perspective. The works came from a private American collection in Pittsburgh.

Among groups of works by individual artists is an ensemble of 12 by Pablo Picasso which encompasses nearly all of the major creative phases of his career. Cubism forms an important focus of the collection, with works in the style by Pablo Picasso, Fernand Léger, Juan Gris, Georges Braque and others.

Art after 1945 is represented primarily by circa 40 major pieces by American artists. Among these are works by Mark Rothko, Robert Rauschenberg, Andy Warhol, Donald Judd and Jackson Pollock, whose monumental Number 32 from 1950 is one of the few mural-sized drip paintings by this artist, and is regarded as a key exemplar of Abstract Expressionism. Among the four works by Robert Rauschenberg is Wager, which dates from 1957 and is one of the largest and most complex of his "combine paintings".

European postwar art is represented among others by the works of Markus Lüpertz, Per Kirkeby, Gerhard Richter, Emil Schumacher and Joseph Beuys, whose late work "Palazzo Regale", acquired in 1992, has been supplemented by a further 60 works. These were formerly owned by Düsseldorf art collector Günter Ulbricht.

Installations and artist's rooms are an important focus of the Kunstsammlung, an area which has been expanded continuously in recent years (through works by Marcel Broodthaers, for example). German photography is represented in the collection by the works of Bernd and Hilla Becher and other exponents of the Düsseldorf School of photographers. In the realm of new media, i.e. film and video, the collection continues to expand, and presently contains around 90 works.

In 2005, the private collection of Simone and Heinz Ackermans, which contained 150 works of international contemporary art, was acquired by the federal state of North Rhine-Westphalia following the display of selected works from the collection at the K21 from 2002 to 2005. The focus of the Ackermans Collection is art since the 1980s, on figurative sculpture, photographic works, installations, as well as film and video works.

== Patrons ==
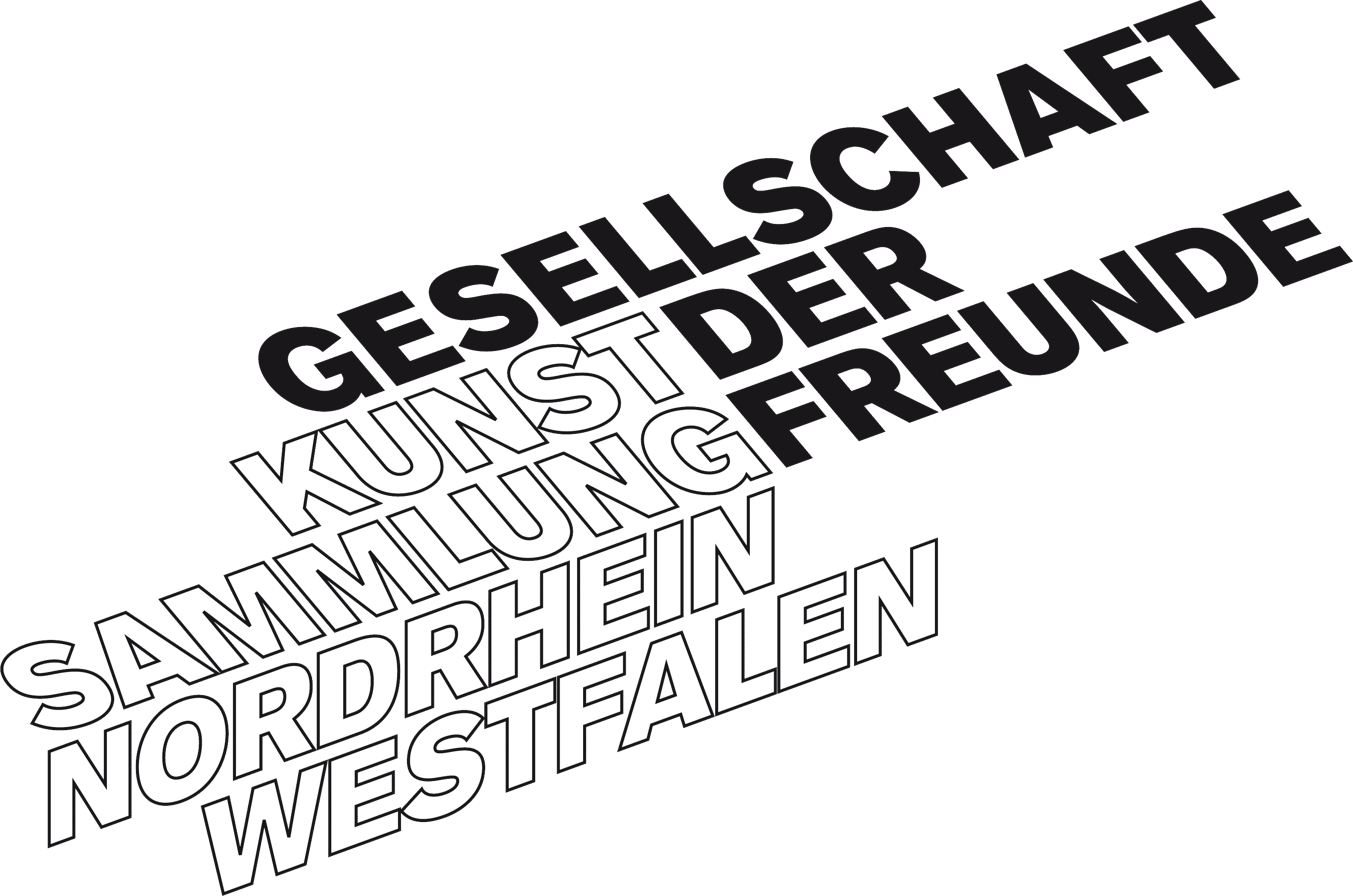
Logo of the patrons

The Gesellschaft der Freunde der Kunstsammlung Nordrhein-Westfalen e.V. (Society of Friends of the Kunstsammlung Nordrhein-Westfalen) has provided the Kunstsammlung with support since 1968. The functions fulfilled by the Society are described in its bylaws, and encompass the conceptual and material furtherance of the Kunstsammlung Nordrhein-Westfalen. Its chief priority is the acquisition of works of art. Thanks to the Friends of the Kunstsammlung, a number of the museum's otherwise unattainable goals in this area have been fulfilled.

In order to cope successfully with a set of challenges which has grown continuously as the museum has expanded to occupy three separate buildings (the K20, the K21 and the Schmela Haus), the Society must call upon a continuously expanding community of "friends" who are prepared to provide both conceptual and material support for this internationally recognized museum of modern and contemporary art.

== Library ==
The K20 has at its disposal a publicly accessible specialist library containing literature on the art of the 20th and 21st centuries. The holdings encompass more than 100,000 volumes, which can be used on location. Among these are monographs, reference works, exhibition catalogs, periodicals, bulletins, and audiovisual media such as videos and CDs. After the death of the museum's founding director, the library was renamed the Werner Schmalenbach Library in his honor.

== See also ==
- List of art museums
- List of museums in Germany

== Literature ==
- Kunstsammlung Nordrhein-Westfalen, Düsseldorf (ed.): Einblicke. Das 20. Jahrhundert in der Kunstsammlung Nordrhein-Westfalen, Düsseldorf. Hatje Cantz Verlag, Ostfildern-Ruit 2000, ISBN 3-7757-0853-7
- Kunstsammlung Nordrhein-Westfalen, Düsseldorf and Prestel Verlag, Munich, Berlin, London, New York (eds.): Kunstsammlung Nordrhein-Westfalen. Prestel Verlag, Munich, 2003, ISBN 978-3-7913-5078-3
- Kunstsammlung Nordrhein-Westfalen, Düsseldorf (ed.): Meisterwerke des 20. und 21. Jahrhunderts, Schirmer/Mosel Produktion 2010, ISBN 978-3-941773-01-1
