= Kalvebod Brygge =

Area of Copenhagen, Denmark

Coordinates: 55°39′54.17″N 12°33′54.81″E

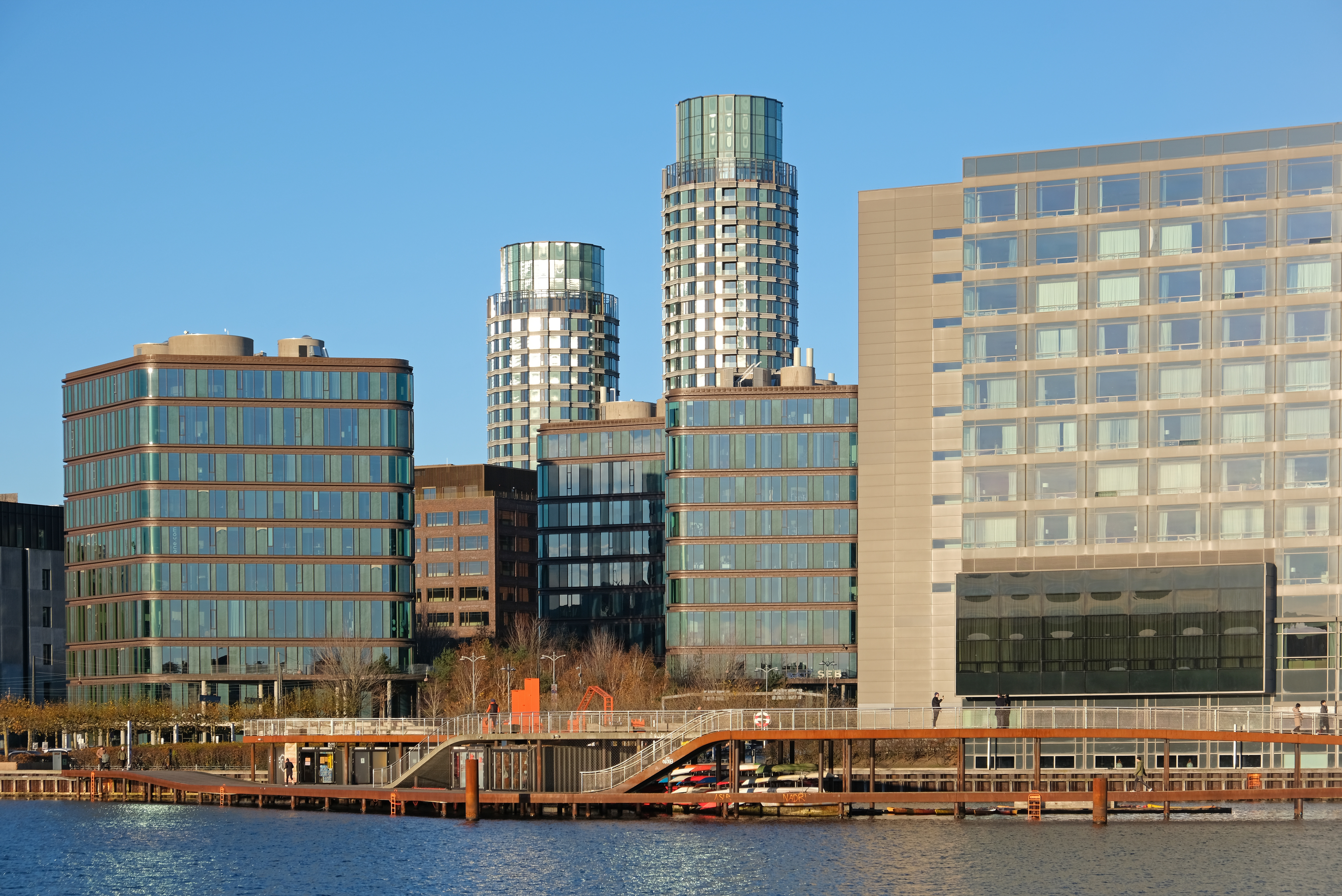
Kalvebod Brygge

Kalvebod Brygge (lit. 'Calf Bodden Quay') is a waterfront area in the Vesterbro district of Copenhagen, Denmark. The name also refers to a section of the Ring 2 ring road which follows the waterfront from Langebro in the north to the H. C. Ørsted Power Station in the south. The area is dominated by office buildings, Tivoli Conference Center, several hotels and the shopping centre Fisketorvet.

The southern part of the area, south of Bernstoffsgade, is to the west bounded by an extensive railway terrain, a section of which is now under redevelopment into a linear park with scattered buildings and a super bikeway, which will ultimately provide a greenway between the city centre and the South Harbour.

The northern part of the road, northeast of Bernstoffsgade, belongs to the Indre By district. It is bounded to the north by the small Rysensteen Quarter where the Copenhagen Police Headquarters is located.

== History ==
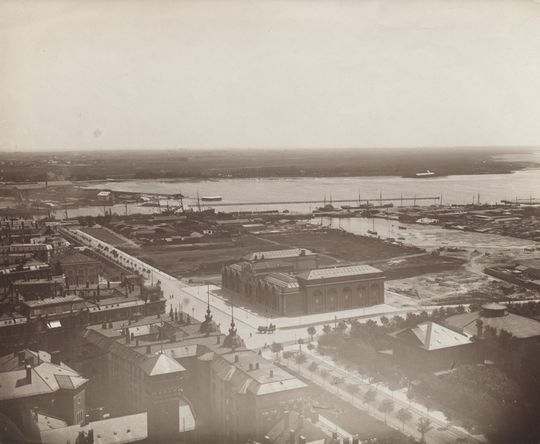
The Timber Dock and lumberyards seen to the right with the newly built Ny Carlsberg Glyptotek and H. C. Andersens Boulevard in the foreground, c. 1897

Both Kalvebod Brygge and the railway terrain, which separates the area from the rest of Vesterbro, are located on reclaimed land. The coast south of Copenhagen was formerly known as Kalvebod Beach. The first land reclamations took place as early as 1755 when the area just outside the West Rampart's Rysensten Bastion was used for establishment of lumberyards. Tømmergraven (The Timber Dock) was later dug out.

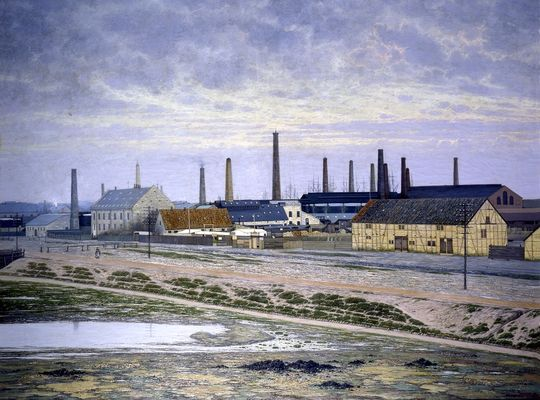
Kalvebod Beach with the Western Gasworks 1910

A little further to the south, Copenhagen's first gasworks, later known as Vestre Gasværk ("The Western Gasworks"), opened on the beach in 1857.

The railway was constructed on reclaimed land between 1897 and 1901. A new goods station was also built on the grounds. It was designed by DSB's head architect Heinrich Wenck and opened in 1901. It was replaced by a modern goods station designed by Ole Hagen in 1968.

The new railway obstructed the Western Gasworks' access to the harbor. The Danish State Railways therefore agreed to building a new Gasworks Harbour on the east side of the railway as part of the project.

The Western Gasworks closed on 8 June 1927 and the site was later used for construction of the White Meat District, a modern expansion of the old meat-packing district (The Brown Meat District) which had been established next to the Haymarket in 1820.

== Waterfront ==
=== Buildings ===
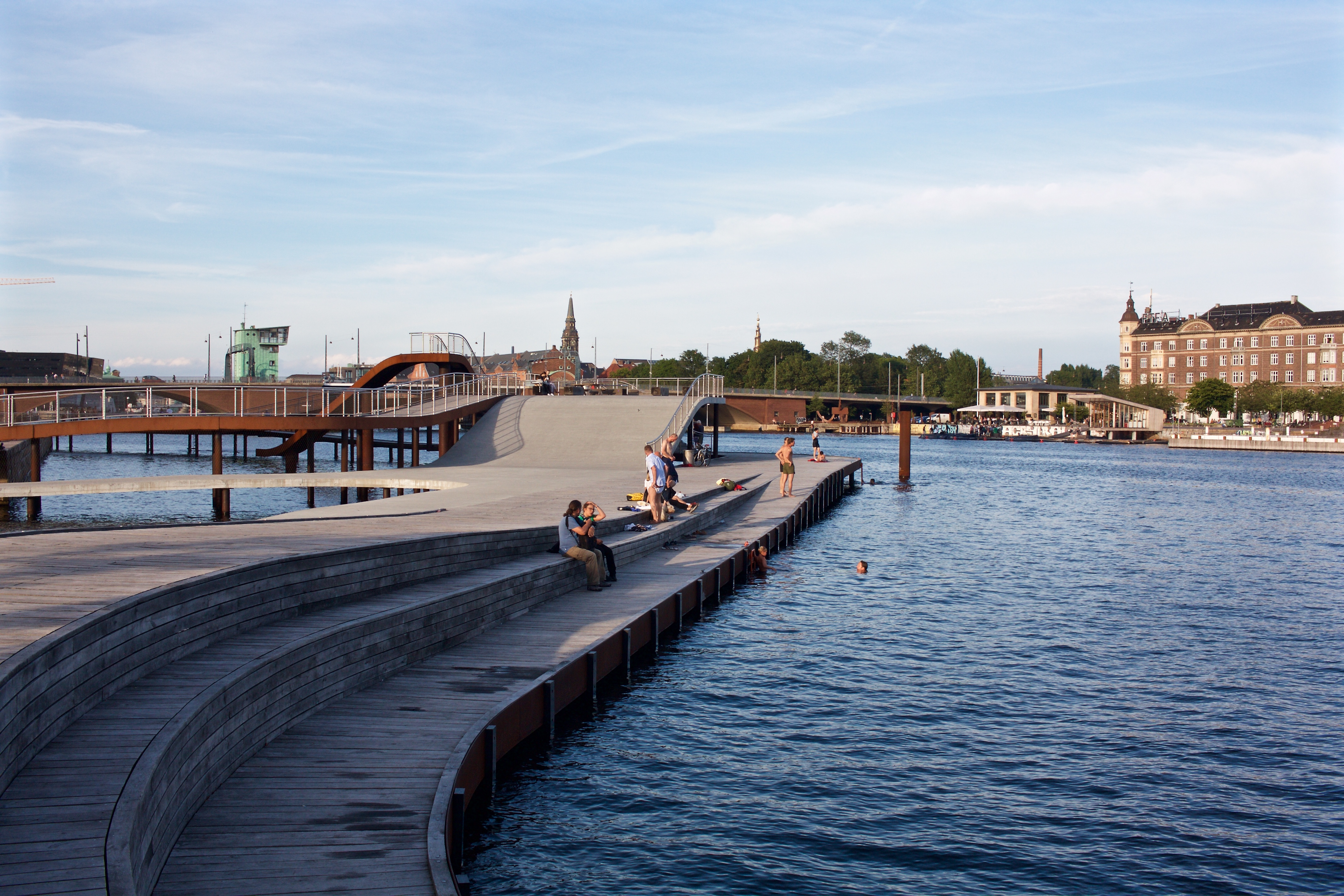
Kalvebod Wave

The waterfront was redeveloped in the late 1990s. Beginning from the north, the buildings along the quay are Nykredit's Head Office (2001, Schmidt hammer lassen), Copenhagen Marriott Hotel (2001, PLH Architects), The Engineer's House (1998, Kieler Architects) and the Fisketorvet shopping centre (2000, Kieler Architects). The Havneholmen mixed-use development was subsequently built on reclaimed land in front of Fisketorvet. In 2011, Nykredit expanded their headquarters with a new building, The Crystal, on the other side of the street. A new plaza was also created in front of the building.

=== The Kalvebod Wave ===
The Kalvebod Wave was designed by JDS Architects and Urban Agency and inaugurated in 2013. It consists of an undulating wooden boardwalk which creates various new spaces for sitting, promenading and water-related activities.

== Kalvebod Brygge West ==
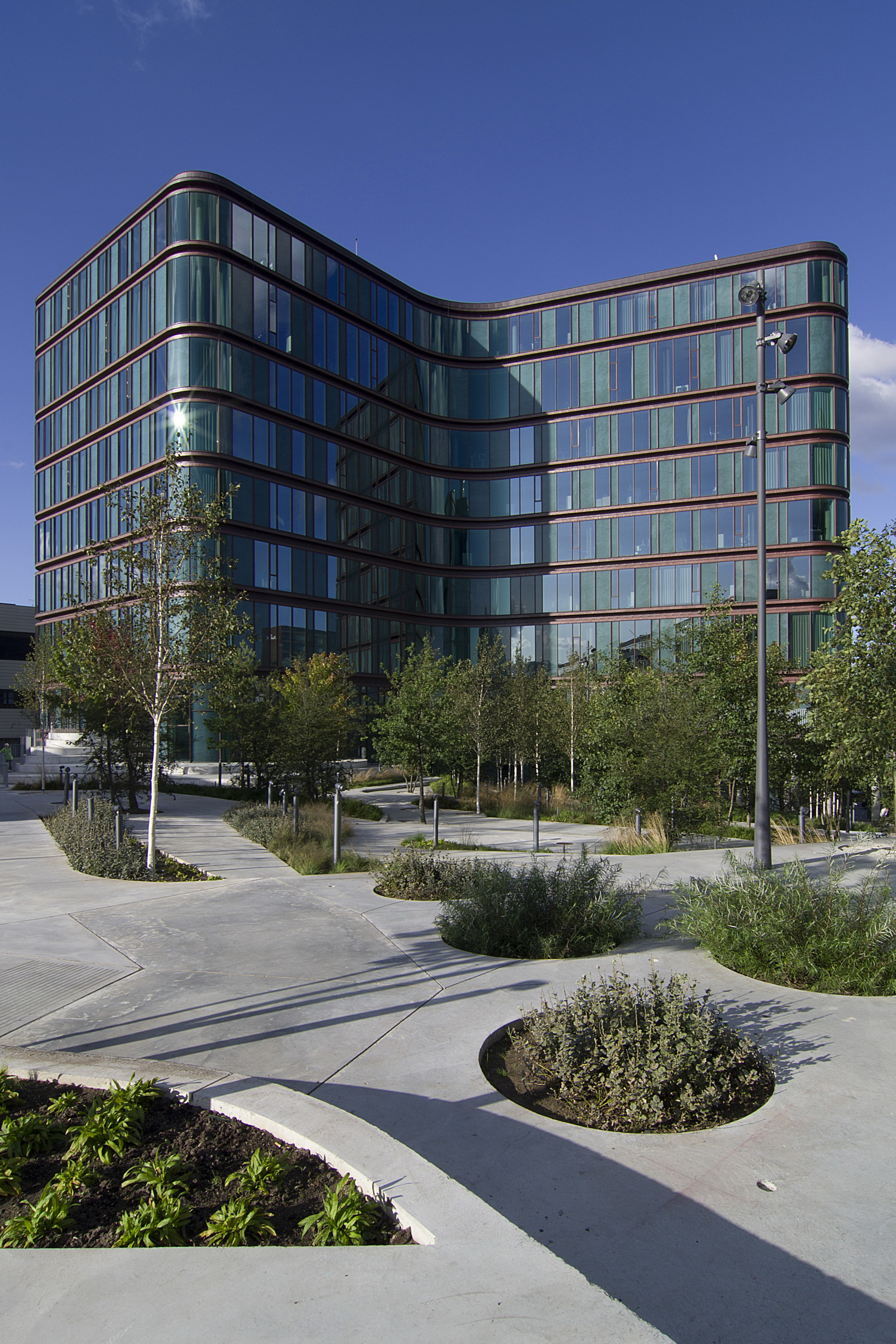
SEB Bank at the beginning of the greenway Glyptotek

A masterplan competition for the disused part of the railway terrain along Kalvebod Brygge was won by Lundgaard & Tranberg. The plan involves a greenway which will ultimately connect the area around Copenhagen Central Station to the South Harbour. Lundgaard & Tranberg has also designed two buildings for SEB Bank & Pension, which, on the corner of Bernstoffsgade and Kalvebod Brygge, flank the beginning of the greenway. The surrounding landscape is designed by Stig L. Anderson. The greenway continues across the roof of the former goods station, which has been converted into a home for the Danish National Archives by PLH Architects.

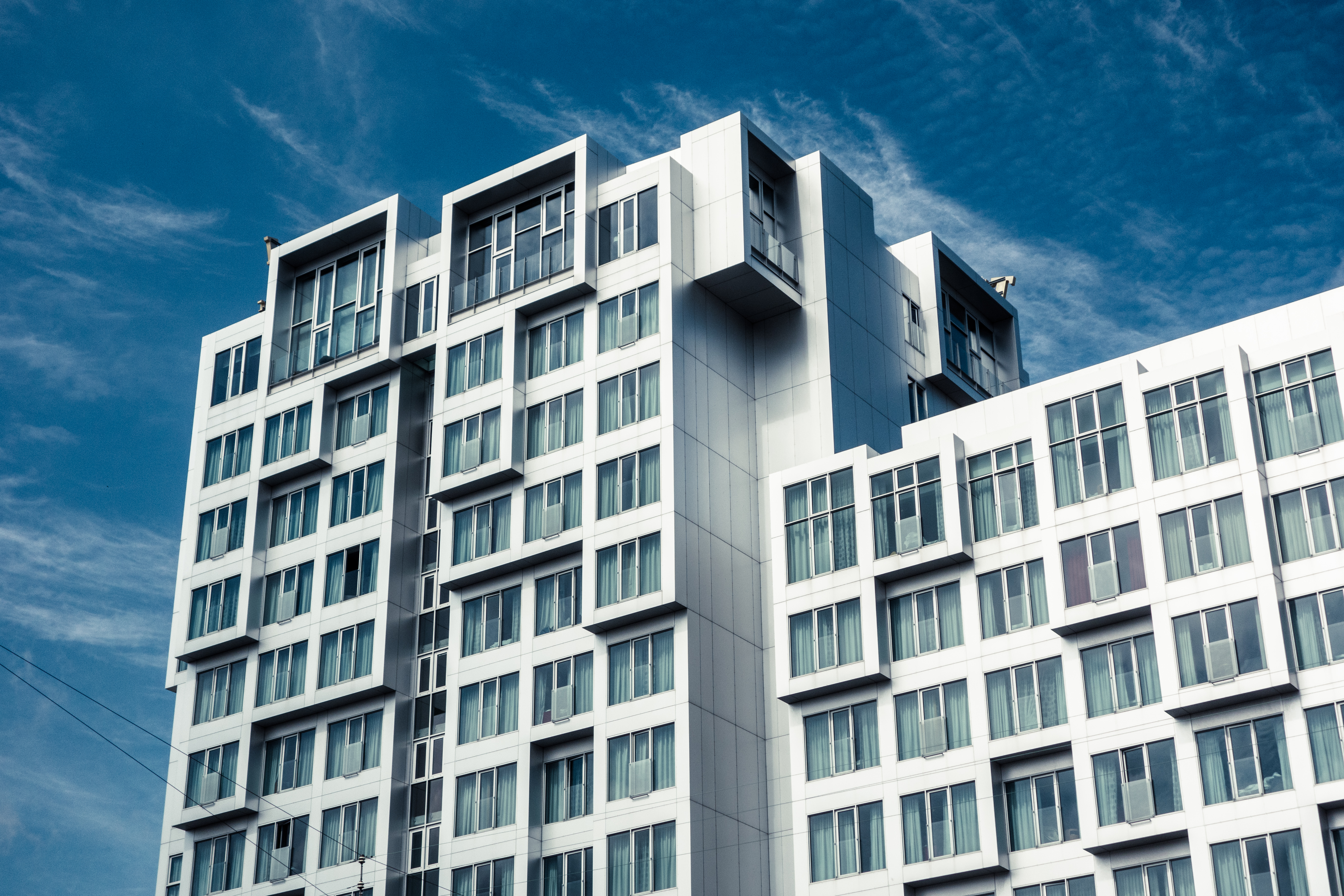
Tivoli Hotel

The raised promenade then continues to Tivoli Hotel and Congress Centre. The complex is designed by Kim Utzon Architects and comprises a conference venue with room for 4,000 people and two hotels. The Tivoli Hotel is currently under expansion. Later stages will continue it southwards to Dybølsbro station and later all the way to the South Harbour. The terraced landscape that surrounds the SEB buildings were designed by Stig L. Andersson.

== Rysensteen Quarter ==
The area north of Kalvebod West, on the other side of Bernstoffsgade, is known as the Rysensteen Quarter (Rysensteens Kvarter), although the name is little used today. The neighbourhood is bounded on the other sides by Tietgensgade to the northwest, separating it from Tivoli Gardens, H. C. Andersens Boulevard to the northeast and Hemnrosgade to the south, separating it from Kalvebod Brygge.

The most notable landmarks in the area are Ny Carlsberg Glyptotek and the Copenhagen Police Headquarters. The former Vestre Elværk power station and Vestre Hospital both front Tietgensgade. A former factory building on Anker Heegaards Gade has been converted into residences for MPs who live in the provinces.

== Transport ==
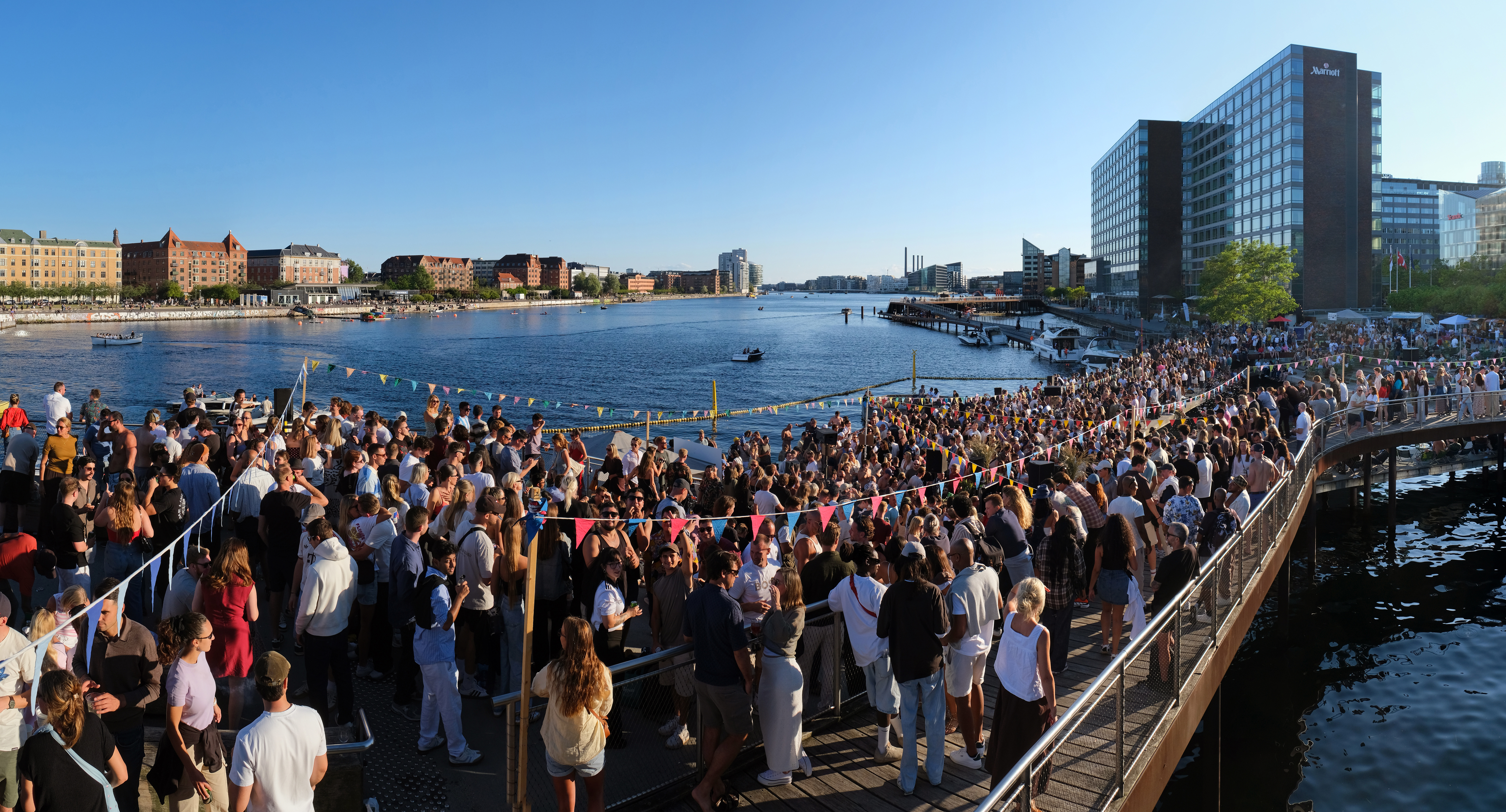
Bølgen, an open-air electronic music event on Kalvebod Bølge

The nearest railway station is Copenhagen Central Station.

== Cultural references ==
The now demolished coal bridge across Kalvebod Brygge is seen at 0:32:25 in the 1975 Olsen-banden film The Olsen Gang on the Track. Kalvebod Brygge is also used as a location in many of the other Olsen Gang films.

== See also ==
- Frederiks Brygge
