= Dissing+Weitling =

Danish architecture and design practice

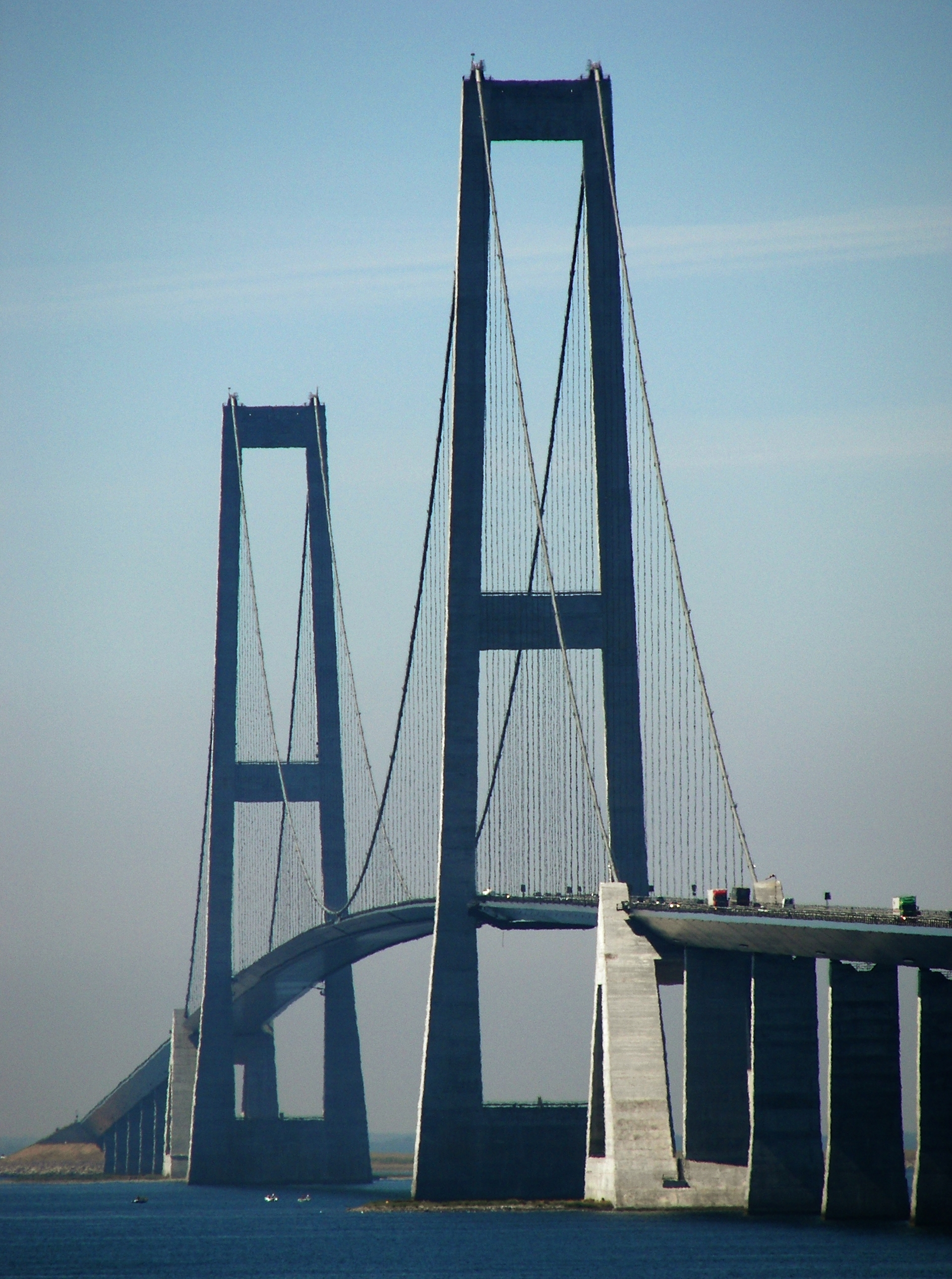
- The Great Belt Bridge

Practice information
- Key architects: Steen S. Trojaborg; Poul Ove Jensen; Daniel V. Hayden
- Partners: Torben Lindquist; Daniel V. Hayden; Jesper Henriksen
- Founded: 1971
- Location: Copenhagen

Significant works and honors
- Buildings: Danish National Bank; DR Television Headquarter; National Bank of Iraq
- Projects: Great Belt Bridge; Femern Bridge; Stonecutter's Bridge

Dissing+Weitling is an architecture and design practice in Copenhagen, Denmark. The founders and namesakes Hans Dissing and Otto Weitling founded the firm upon the death of Arne Jacobsen as a continuation of his office where both had been key employees.

Dissing+Weitling is particularly notable for the design of a great number of bridges around the world, ranging from small pedestrian and bicycle bridges to some of the longest bridges in the world, including the Danish Great Belt, Øresund Bridge and Osman Gazi Bridge.

== History ==
Hans Dissing and Otto Weitling were key employees at Arne Jacobsen's office and they founded Dissing+Weitling in 1971 upon his death to continue and complete his unfinished projects. These included a city hall in Mainz, Germany, which was also extended by Dissing+Weitling in 2008, a holiday resort on the north German island of Fehmarn, the Danish Embassy in London. In 1972, the firm won competitions for the IBM Centre in Hamburg and the Kunstsammlung Nordrhein-Westfalen in Düsseldorf, establishing the firm's name in its own right. Hans Dissing died in 1998, and Otto Weitling retired from the firm in 2002. Key architects and partners of the past were: Dieter Fremerey, Erik P. Handschuh, Poul Ove Jensen, Pouli H. Møller, Bodil A. Schaltz, Reinhard Schmidt-Petersen, Reinhard Tölke, Teit Weylandt, and Stig Mikkelsen. Current partners are: Steen S. Trojaborg, and Daniel V. Hayden.

== Selected Projects ==
=== Buildings ===
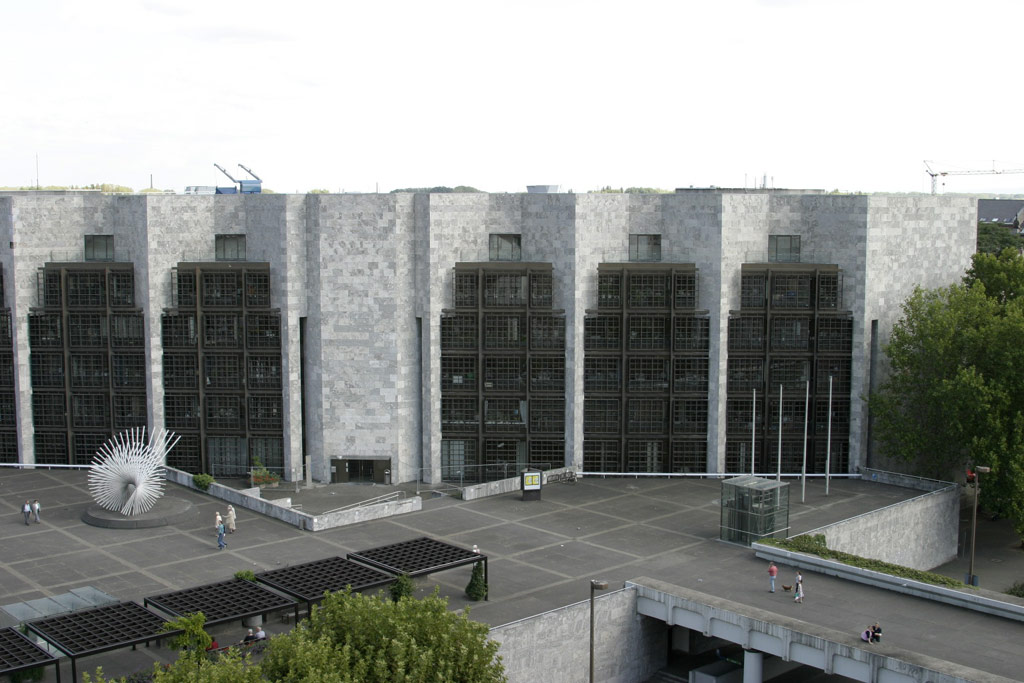
Mainz City Hall (1971)

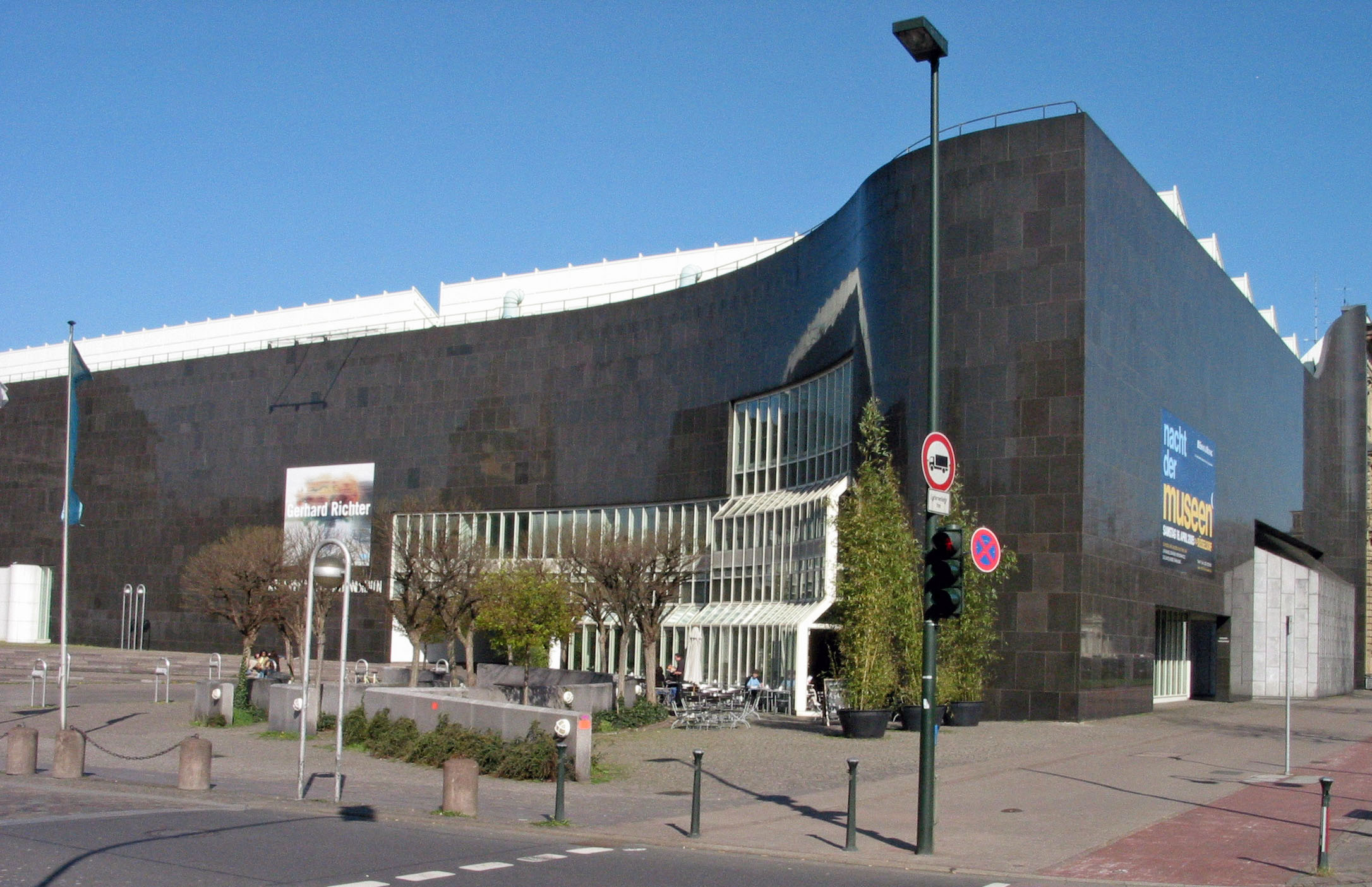
K20 Art Gallery

Central Bank of Iraq (1985)
- Mainz City Hall (Rathaus), Mainz, Germany (completed 1971)
- Danish National Bank, Copenhagen, DK (completed 1971)
- IBM Centre, Hamburg, Germany (completed 1974)
- Castrop-Rauxel Forum & Town Hall (Forum & Rathaus), Castrop-Rauxel, Germany (completed 1976)
- Danish Embassy, London, UK (completed 1977)
- Central Bank of Iraq, Baghdad, Iraq (completed 1985)
- K20 Art Gallery, Düsseldorf, Germany (completed 1986)
- Sonofon Headquarters, Copenhagen, Denmark (completed 1998)
- Parliament of Denmark renovation and interior design, Copenhagen, DK (completed 2004)
- Ny Carlsberg Glyptotek renovation, Copenhagen, Denmark
- DR Television Headquarter, Ørestad, Copenhagen, Denmark (completed 2006)
- Faculty Library, University of Copenhagen, Copenhagen, Denmark (completed 2008)
- Crowne Plaza, Copenhagen, Ørestad, Denmark (completed 2009)
- Rambøll Headquarters, Ørestad, Copenhagen, Denmark (completion 2010)
- Royal Golf Center, Ørestad (completion 2011)
- ECCO Hotel and conference building, Tønder, Denmark (completion 2012)

=== Bridges ===
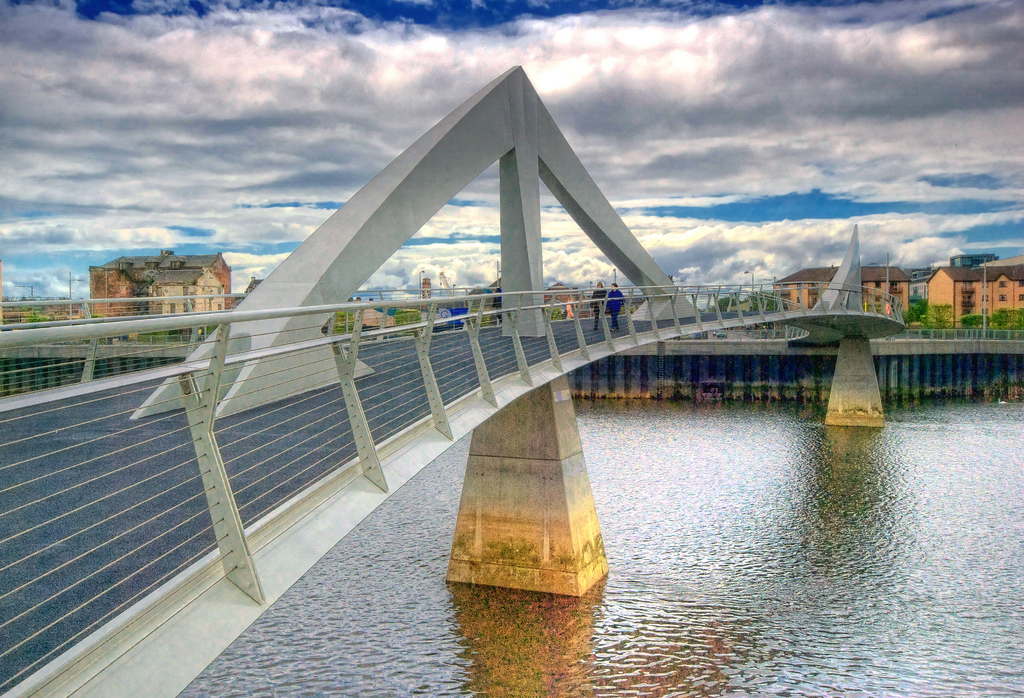
Tradeston Bridge (2009)

- Great Belt Bridge, Funen/Zealand, DK (completed 1998)
- Mittellandkanal Bridges, Hannover, Germany (completed 1999)
- Øresund Bridge, Denmark/Sweden (Competition winner. The project completed in 2000 is not their winning design scheme)
- Nelson Mandela Bridge, Johannesburg, South Africa (completed 2003)
- University Bridge, Malmö, Sweden (completed 2004)
- Bryggebroen, Copenhagen, DK (completed 2006)
- Munksjön Bridge, Jönköping, Sweden (completed 2007)
- Stonecutter's Bridge, Hong Kong (Competition winner. Detail design by Arup. Completed in 2009)
- Åbroen, Copenhagen, DK (completed 2008)
- Tradeston Bridge, Glasgow, Scotland (completed 2009)
- ADNEC Bridge, Abu Dhabi, UAE
- Sitra Interchange, Sitra, Bahrain
- Pirbrua over Nidelva, Trondheim, Norway
- Constantine Bridge, Wilaya de Constantine, Algeria (inaugurated on 05.07.2014)
- Osman Gazi Bridge in Turkey, a 2,682 m (8,799 ft) long road bridge with 1,550 m (5,090 ft) longest span (completion 2010-2017).
- Queensferry Crossing, Scotland (completed 2017)
- New Gerald Desmond Bridge, California, USA (completed 2020)
- Cebu–Cordova Link Expressway, Metro Cebu, Philippines (inaugurated on 2022-04-27)

Under construction

- Botniabanen Bridges, Nyeland-Umeå, Sweden
- Qatar-Lusail bridge, Lusail, Qatar (competition win 2007)
- Msikaba Bridge (2018-present), South Africa

Competitions won

- Neue Alte Nahebrücke, Bad Kreuznach, Germany (competition won 2010) The bridge was not built. Due to financial constraints the existing bridge 1956 bridge was restored.

== Awards ==
- 1999 Nykredit Architecture Prize
- 2015 WAN Transport Award for The Bicycle Snake
