= Sluseholmen station =

Copenhagen metro station

Sluseholmen
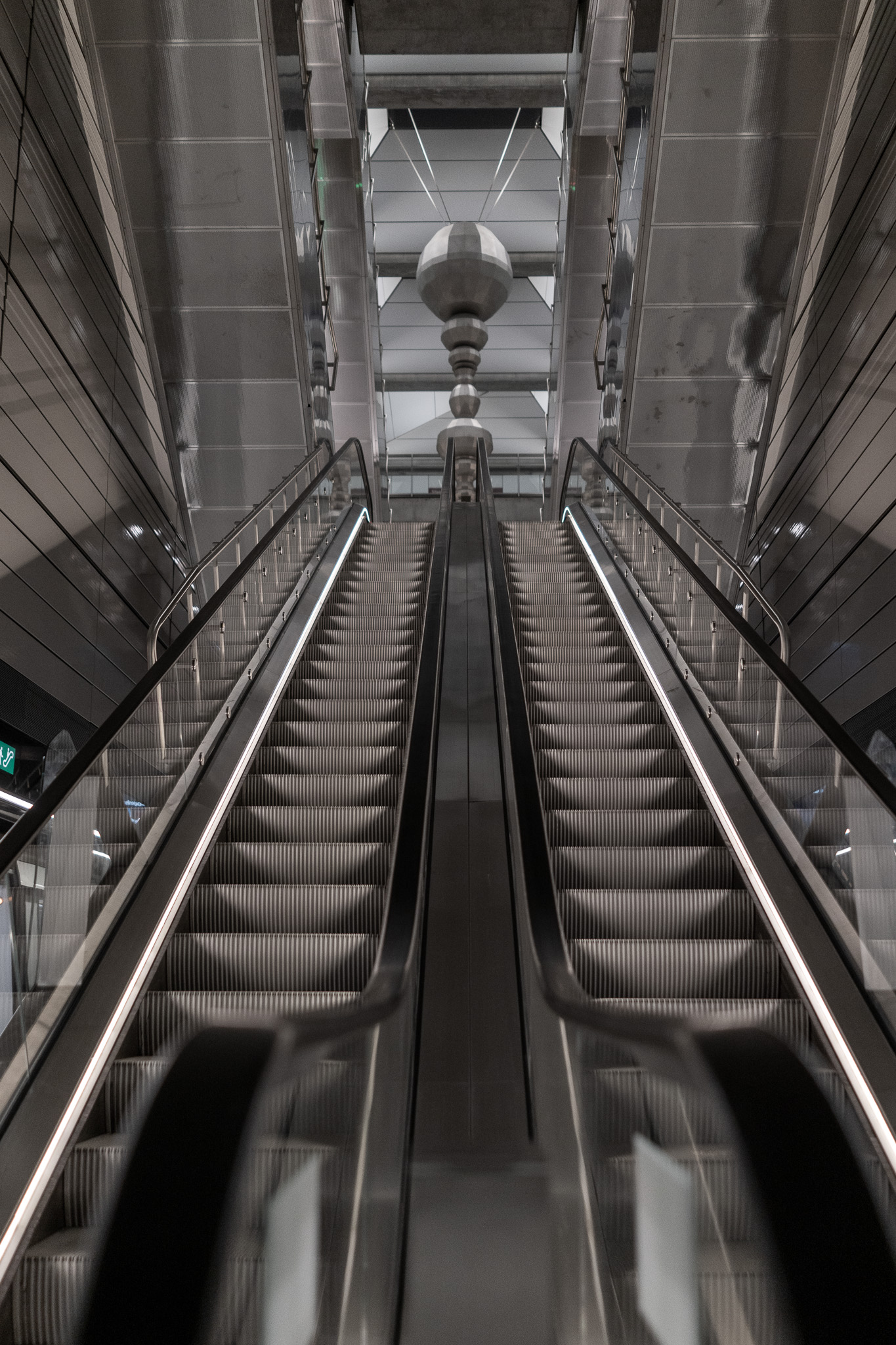

General information
- Coordinates: 55°38′45″N 12°32′40″E
- System: Copenhagen Metro Station
- Owner: Metroselskabet

Construction
- Accessible: Yes

History
- Opened: 22 June 2024; 2 years ago

Services
Preceding station	Copenhagen Metro	Following station
Mozarts Plads towards Copenhagen South	M4	Enghave Brygge towards Orientkaj
Location
- Location within Copenhagen Location within Greater Copenhagen Location within Denmark

Sluseholmen station is an underground Copenhagen Metro station in the eponymous neighborhood of Copenhagen, Denmark. The station is on the M4 Line, between Enghave Brygge and Mozarts Plads.

== History ==
The station was opened on 22 June 2024 together with 5 other stations of the extension of the line from Copenhagen Central to Copenhagen South.
