= Havneholmen station =

Copenhagen metro station

Havneholmen
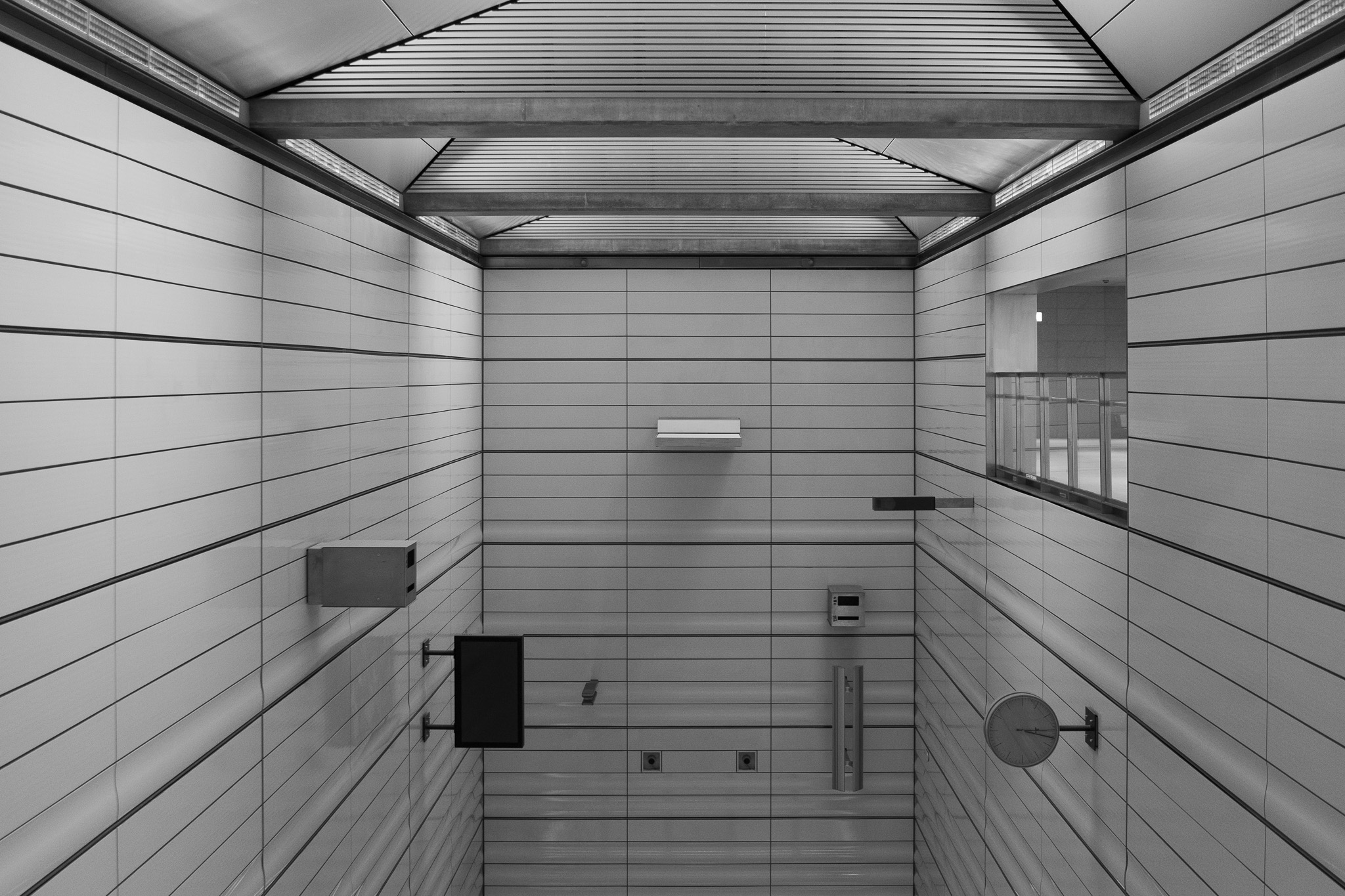

General information
- Coordinates: 55°39′31″N 12°33′54″E
- System: Copenhagen Metro Station
- Owner: Metroselskabet

Construction
- Accessible: Yes

History
- Opened: 22 June 2024; 2 years ago

Services
Preceding station	Copenhagen Metro	Following station
Enghave Brygge towards Copenhagen South	M4	Copenhagen Central towards Orientkaj
Location
- Location within Copenhagen Location within Greater Copenhagen Location within Denmark

Havneholmen station is an underground Copenhagen Metro station, located next to the eponymous street and development, in Copenhagen, Denmark. The station is on the M4 Line, between Copenhagen Central and Enghave Brygge.

The metro station hosts a permanent art installation of the artist group Superflex, which includes clocks and other station inventory hanging upside down, and clocks going wild forward and backwards

== History ==
The station was opened on 22 June 2024 together with 5 other stations of the extension of the line from Copenhagen Central to Copenhagen South.
