= Mozarts Plads station =

Copenhagen metro station

Mozarts Plads
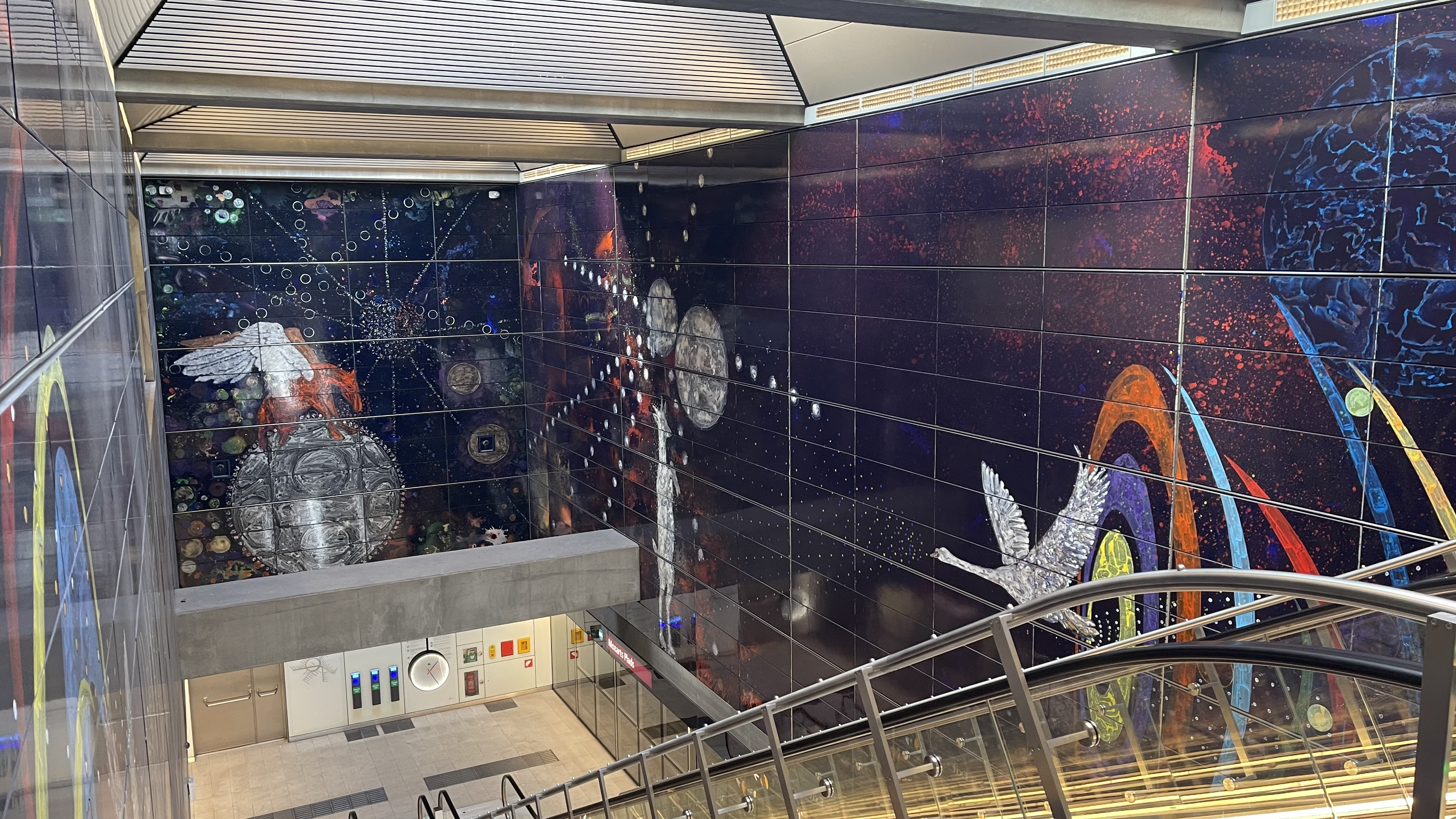

General information
- Coordinates: 55°39′24″N 12°31′45″E
- System: Copenhagen Metro Station
- Owner: Metroselskabet

Construction
- Accessible: Yes

History
- Opened: 22 June 2024; 2 years ago

Services
Preceding station	Copenhagen Metro	Following station
Copenhagen South Terminus	M4	Sluseholmen towards Orientkaj
Location
- Location within Copenhagen Location within Greater Copenhagen Location within Denmark

Mozarts Plads station is an underground Copenhagen Metro station located at the eponymous urban square in Copenhagen, Denmark. The station is on the M4 Line, between Sluseholmen and Copenhagen South.

== History ==
The station was opened on 22 June 2024 together with 5 other stations of the extension of the line from Copenhagen Central to Copenhagen South.
