= Enghave Brygge station =

Copenhagen metro station

Enghave Brygge
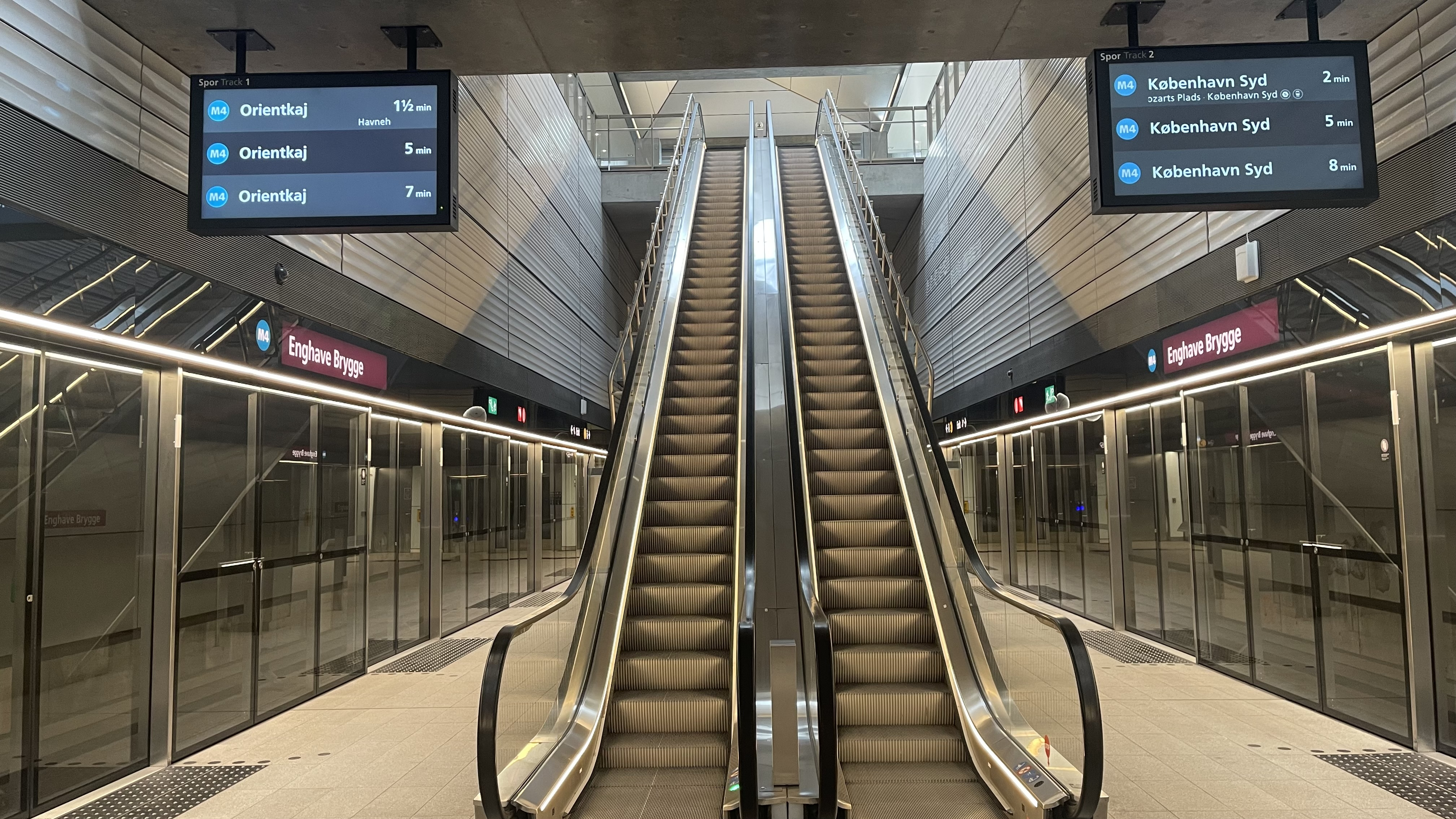

General information
- Coordinates: 55°38′51″N 12°33′45″E
- System: Copenhagen Metro Station
- Owner: Metroselskabet

Construction
- Accessible: Yes

History
- Opened: 22 June 2024; 2 years ago

Services
Preceding station	Copenhagen Metro	Following station
Sluseholmen towards Copenhagen South	M4	Havneholmen towards Orientkaj
Location
- Location within Copenhagen Location within Greater Copenhagen Location within Denmark

Enghave Brygge station is an underground Copenhagen Metro station, located in the eponymous area of Copenhagen, Denmark. The station is on the M4 Line, between Havneholmen and Sluseholmen.

== History ==
The station was opened on 22 June 2024 together with 5 other stations of the extension of the line from Copenhagen Central to Copenhagen South.
