= M4 (Copenhagen Metro) =

Metro line in Copenhagen, Denmark

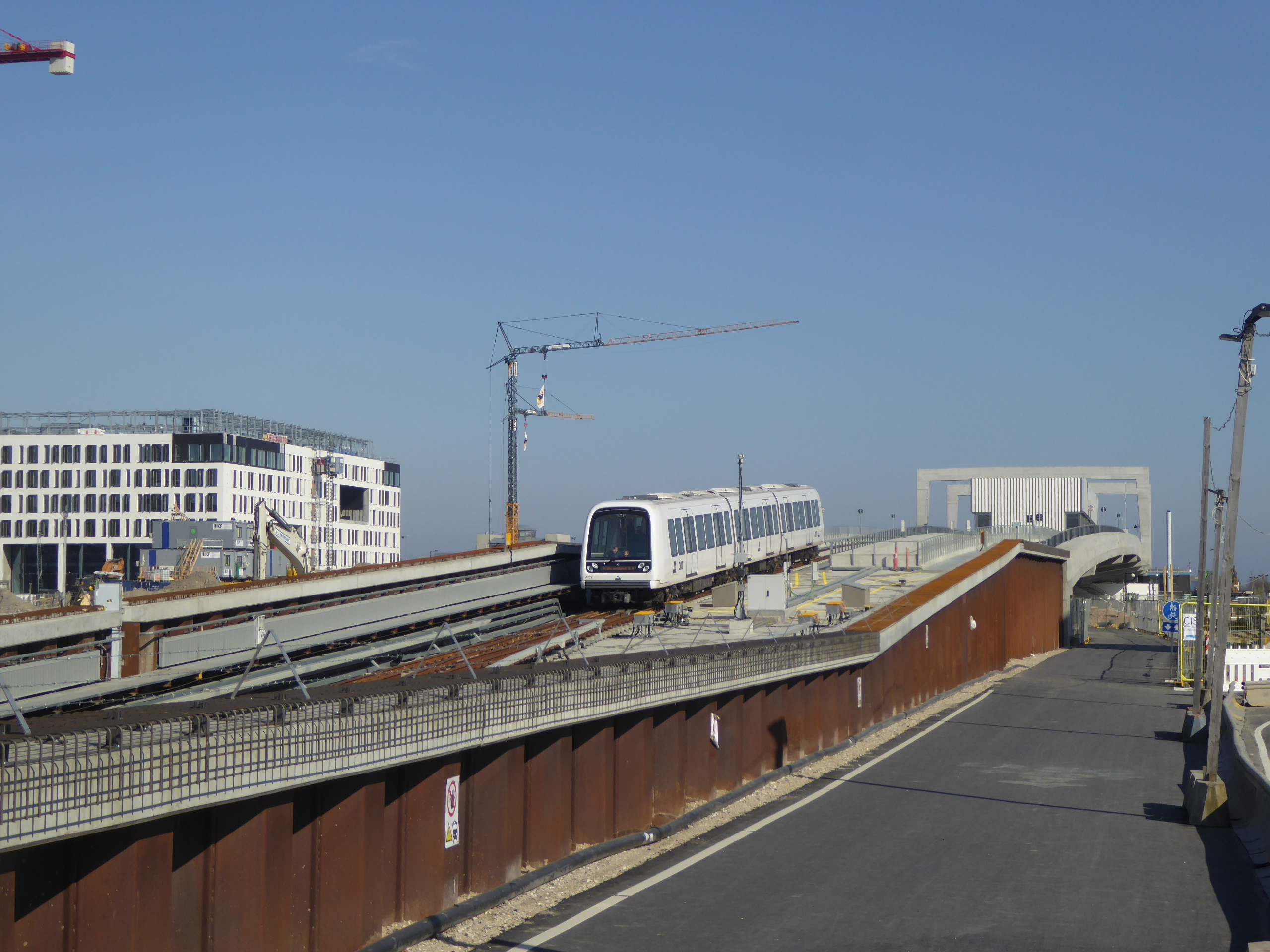
- M4 train leaving Orientkaj station

Overview
- Owner: Metroselskabet
- Locale: Copenhagen, Denmark
- Termini: Orientkaj; Copenhagen South
- Stations: 13

Service
- Type: Rapid transit
- System: Copenhagen Metro
- Operator: Metro Service

History
- Opened: 28 March 2020; 6 years ago
- Last extension: 22 June 2024; 2 years ago

Technical
- Number of tracks: Double
- Character: Underground
- Track gauge: 1,435 mm (4 ft 8 1/2 in) standard gauge
- Electrification: 750 V DC third rail
- Operating speed: 90 km/h (56 mph)
Route map

The M4 (the Harbour Line) of the Copenhagen Metro connects Nordhavn in the north with Sydhavn in the south. The central part of the line shares tracks with the City Circle Line (M3).

The Nordhavn branch was approved by the Danish Parliament in 2012 and was opened on 28 March 2020. The Sydhavn branch was approved in 2015 and opened on 22 June 2024. A further Nordhavn extension is planned with two new stations opening in 2030.

Both Nordhavn and Sydhavn are former industrial areas situated at opposite ends of the Port of Copenhagen and currently undergoing urban renewal under the auspices of By & Havn.

When the City Circle Line was planned, the M4 was intended to supplement the M3 from Nørrebro to København H providing increased metro capacity to the eastern section of the inner city. At this time, it was presumed that the M4 would eventually be expanded from Nørrebro to the northwestern suburbs, but this plan was abandoned in 2009, when the city of Copenhagen scrapped plans for an interchange facility under Nørrebro station. Instead, the city preferred a solution where the M4 would connect the Nordhavn and Sydhavn districts.

== Stations and route ==
The M4 Line serves 13 stations. From København H to Østerport the line is shared with M3.

=== Stations ===
Nordhavn section (2020)

- Orientkaj
- Nordhavn (interchange with S-trains)

Stations shared with the M3 (2020)

- Østerport (interchange with S-trains and DSB)
- Marmorkirken (The Marble Church)
- Kongens Nytorv (interchange with all other metro lines)
- Gammel Strand near Christiansborg Palace
- Rådhuspladsen (City Hall Square)
- København H (Copenhagen Central Station, interchange with S-trains and DSB.)

Sydhavn section (2024)

- Havneholmen
- Enghave Brygge
- Sluseholmen
- Mozarts Plads
- Copenhagen South (until 2024 named Ny Ellebjerg, interchange with S-trains and DSB)

In April 2017 it was announced that the five Sydhavn stations would feature artwork from five Danish artists: Superflex, Pernille With Madsen, René Schmidt, Christian Schmidt-Rasmussen, Henrik Plenge Jakobsen.

== Future extensions ==
An extension further into Nordhavn, with the creation of two new stations (Levantkaj and Nordsø Plads) is planned for 2032, with construction starting in 2027.

Two possible extensions from Copenhagen South Station are being looked into. One towards Hvidovre and one towards Bispebjerg. To enable such future extensions from Copenhagen South (the current terminus of M4), it was decided in 2016 that the station would be built as an underground station instead of overground as previously planned.
