= Nordhavn railway station =

Commuter and rapid transit railway station in Copenhagen, Denmark

Nordhavn
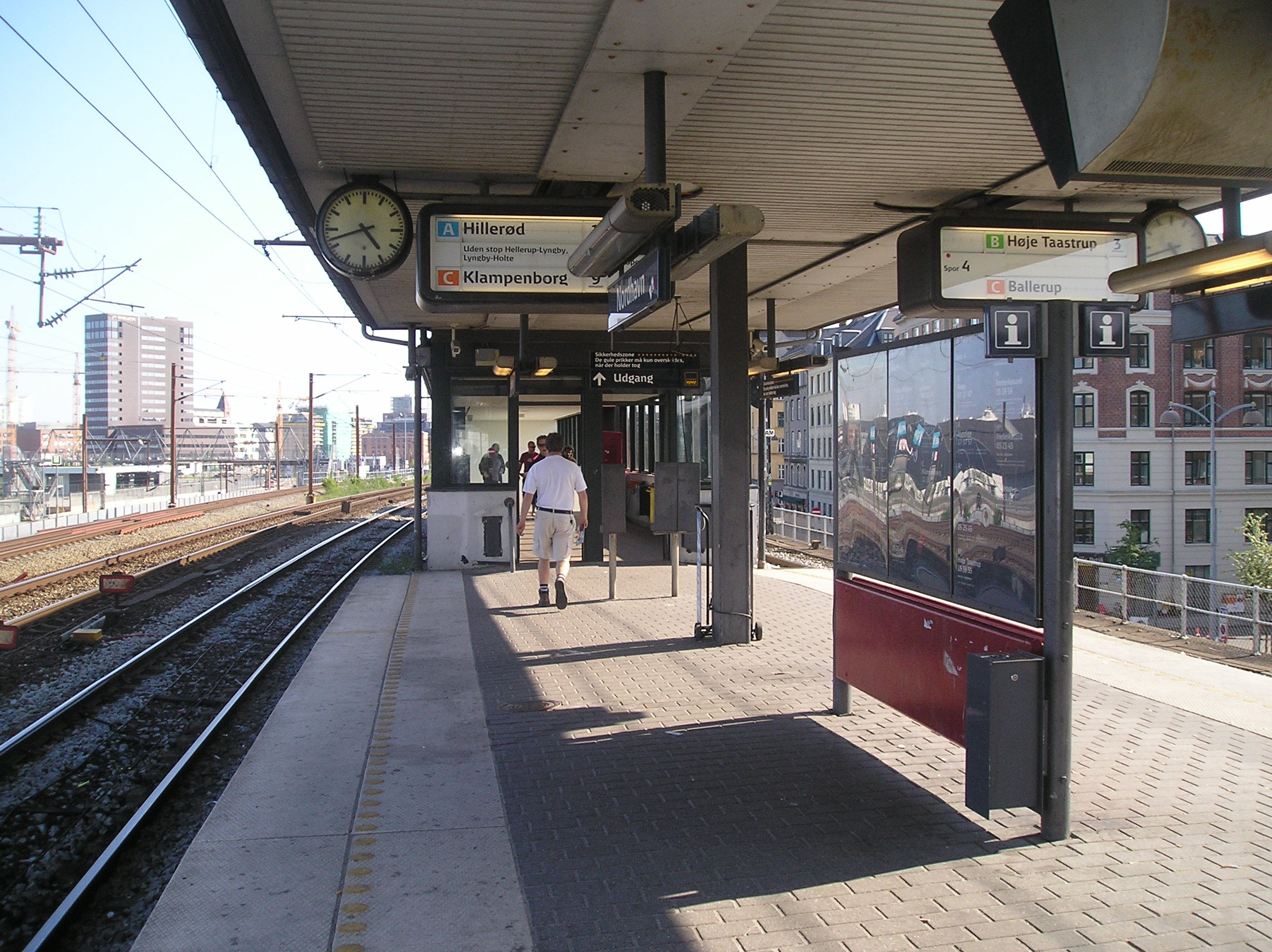
- The S-train station in 2007

General information
- Location: Østbanegade 120; 2100 Copenhagen Ø Copenhagen Municipality; Denmark
- Coordinates: 55°42′19″N 12°35′27″E
- Elevation: S-train: 8.0 metres (26.2 ft)
- System: S-train and Metro
- Owner: DSB (station infrastructure); Banedanmark (rail infrastructure)
- Platforms: 2 island platforms (1 for S-train, 1 for Metro)
- Tracks: 6 (2 S-train, 2 Metro, 2 non-stop Kystbanen)
- Train operators: DSB
- Bus routes: 14, 23

Construction
- Structure type: Elevated (S-train); Underground (Metro)
- Platform levels: 2
- Architect: Knud Tanggaard Seest

Other information
- Station code: Nht
- Fare zone: 1

History
- Opened: 15 May 1934; 92 years ago

Services
| Preceding station | S-train | Following station |
|---|---|---|
| Svanemøllen towards Hillerød | A | Østerport towards Hundige |
| Svanemøllen towards Hillerød | A Sat–Sun | Østerport towards Køge |
| Svanemøllen towards Farum | B | Østerport towards Høje Taastrup |
| Svanemøllen towards Buddinge | Bx Peak hours | Østerport towards Høje Taastrup |
| Svanemøllen towards Klampenborg | C | Østerport towards Frederikssund |
| Svanemøllen towards Holte | E Mon–Fri | Østerport towards Køge |
| Preceding station | Copenhagen Metro | Following station |
| Østerport towards Copenhagen South | M4 | Orientkaj Terminus |
Location

Nordhavn station is a commuter rail and rapid transit railway station in Copenhagen, Denmark.

The station serves the eastern part of the district of Østerbro, as well as the harbour area of Nordhavn. The station is by the lines A, H, B, C, and E of the Copenhagen S-train network and line M4 of the Copenhagen Metro network. The S-train station opened in 1934, and the metro station opened in 2020.

== History ==
Nordhavn station was opened on 15 May 1934 simultaneously with the opening of the S-train service on the Boulevard Line between Østerport station and Copenhagen Central Station also known as Røret (literally: the tube).

In 2006 the station was rebuilt. The existing shop and DSB ticket office were merged into a new 7-Eleven shop that is located just inside the station entrance.

The metro station opened on 28 March 2020 with the opening of the M4-line of the Copenhagen Metro.

== Architecture ==
The functionalist station from 1934 was built to designs by the Danish architect Knud Tanggaard Seest who was the head architect of the Danish State Railways from 1922 to 1949.

== Number of travellers ==
According to the Østtællingen in 2008:

| År | Antal | År | Antal | År | Antal | År | Antal |
|---|---|---|---|---|---|---|---|
| 1957 | 4.512 | 1974 | 2.975 | 1991 | 4.863 | 2001 | 12.236 |
| 1960 | 4.190 | 1975 | 2.762 | 1992 | 4.729 | 2002 | 6.465 |
| 1962 | 4.314 | 1977 | 2.573 | 1993 | 4.868 | 2003 | 7.023 |
| 1964 | 3.829 | 1979 | 3.198 | 1995 | 5.000 | 2004 | 7.329 |
| 1966 | 3.545 | 1981 | 3.535 | 1996 | 5.119 | 2005 | 8.112 |
| 1968 | 3.395 | 1984 | 4.007 | 1997 | 4.988 | 2006 | 7.910 |
| 1970 | 3.472 | 1987 | 4.815 | 1998 | 5.496 | 2007 | 7.631 |
| 1972 | 3.554 | 1990 | 4.628 | 2000 | 5.785 | 2008 | 7.934 |

== Gallery ==
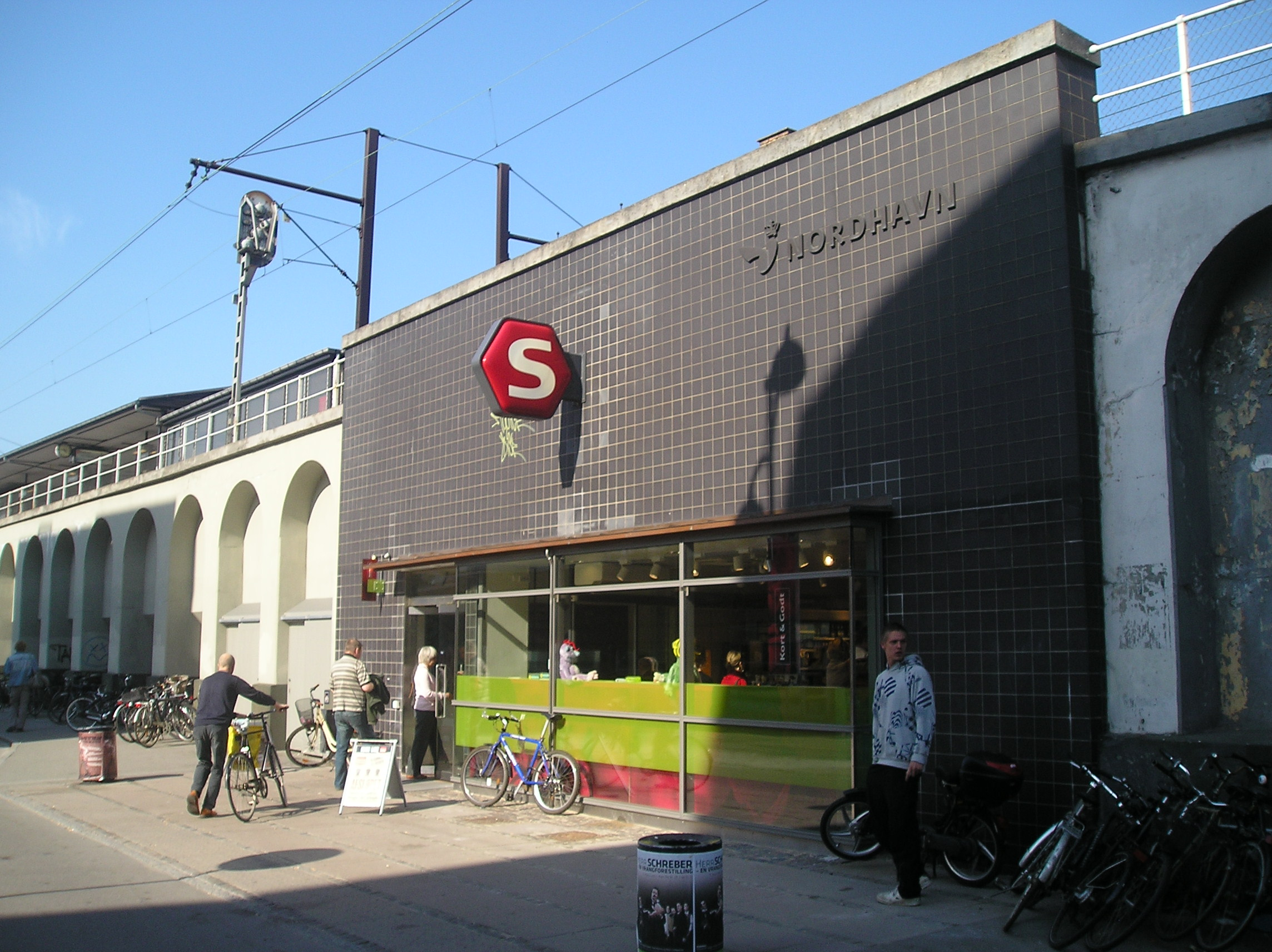
Southern ground level entrance to the station

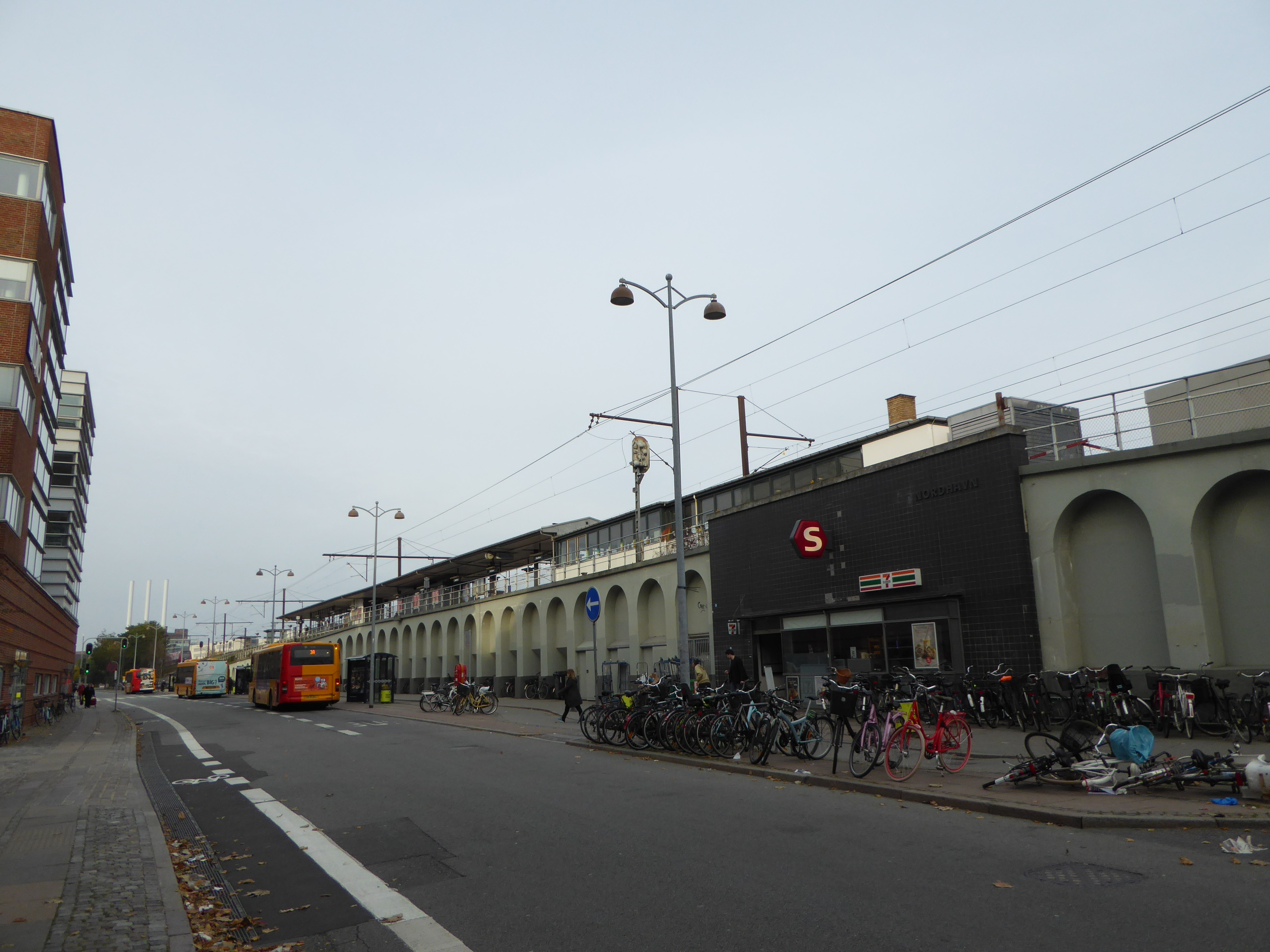
Street view of the station

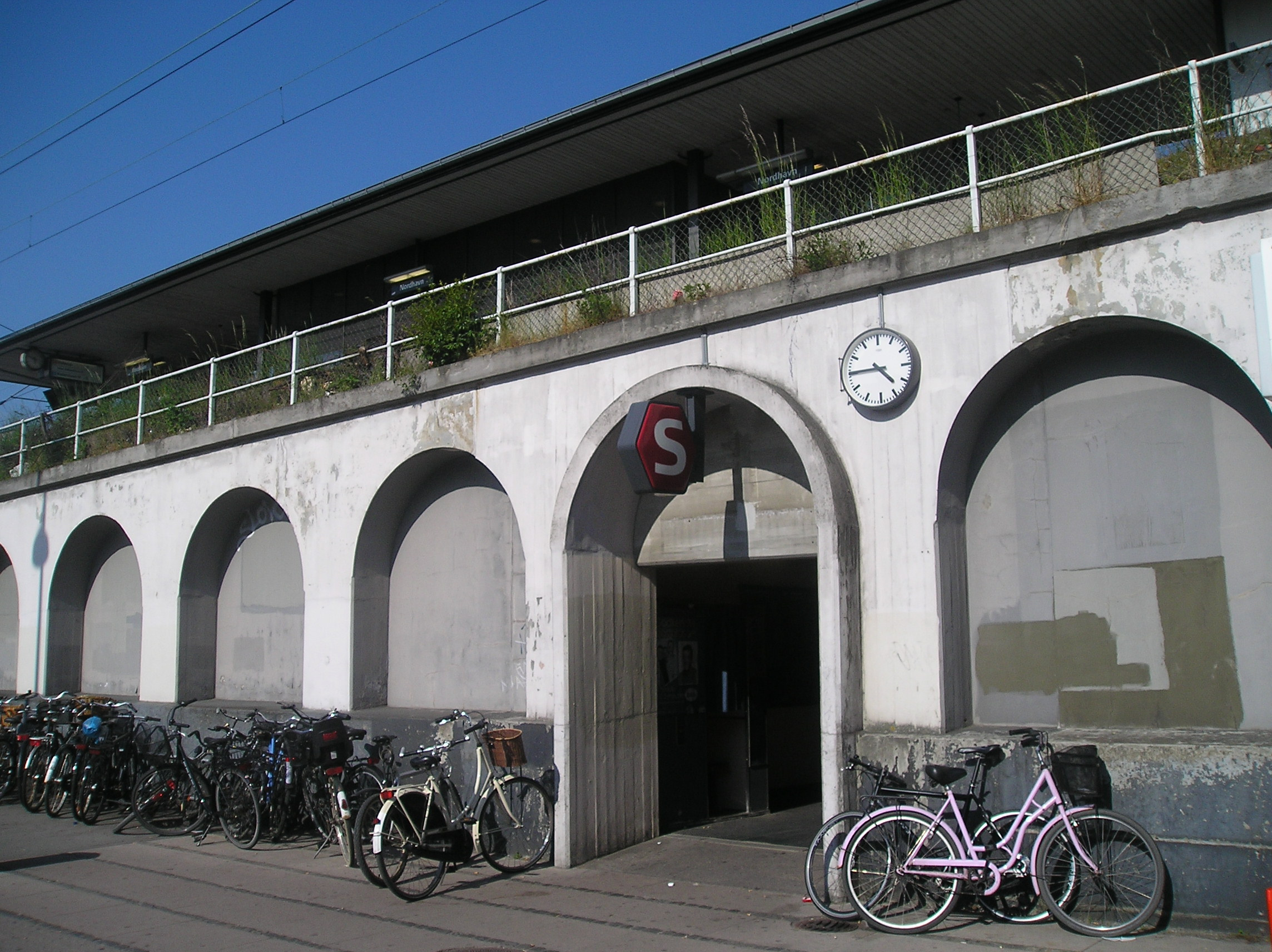
Northern ground level entrance to the station

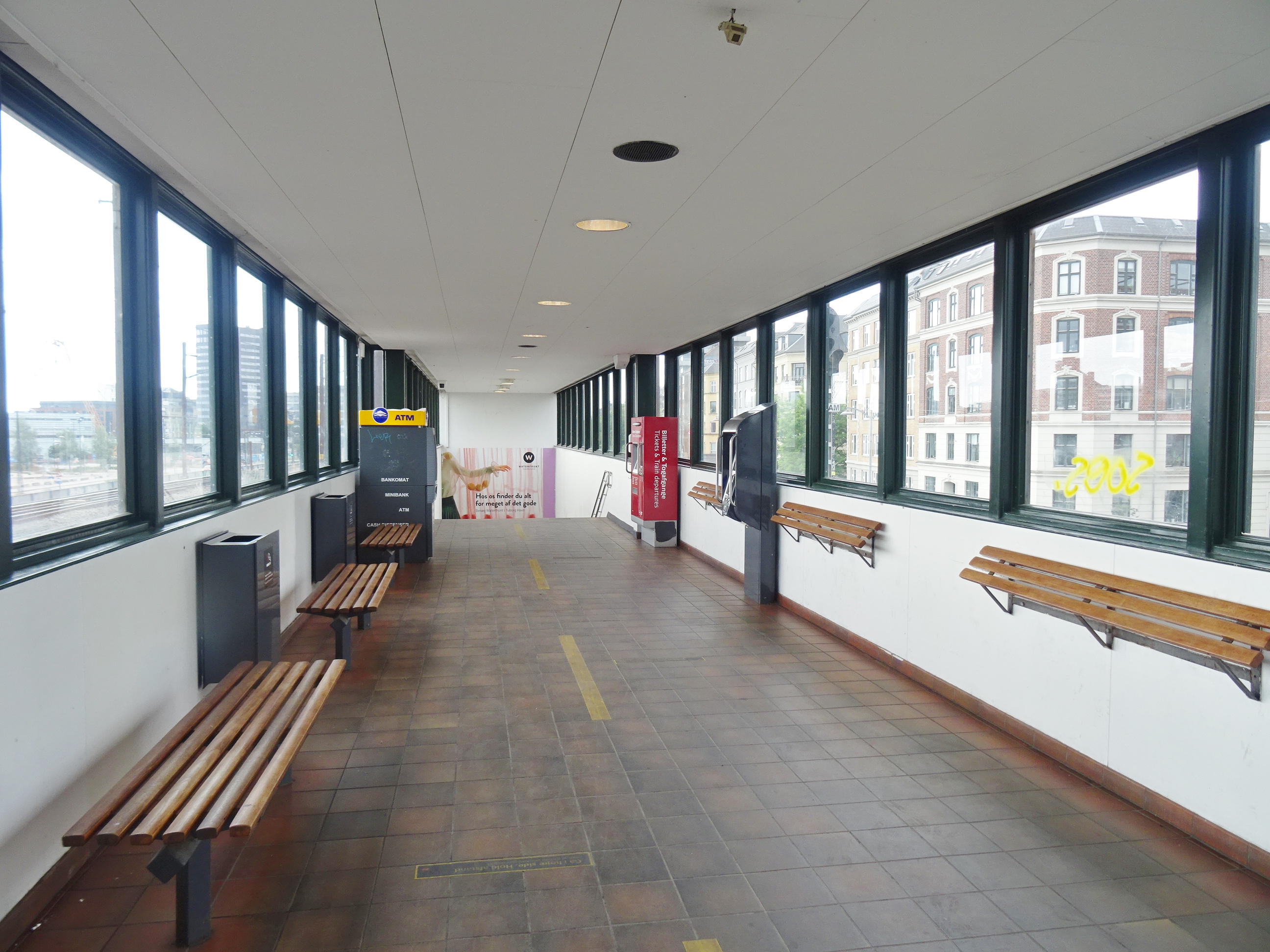
Waiting room at the S-train platform

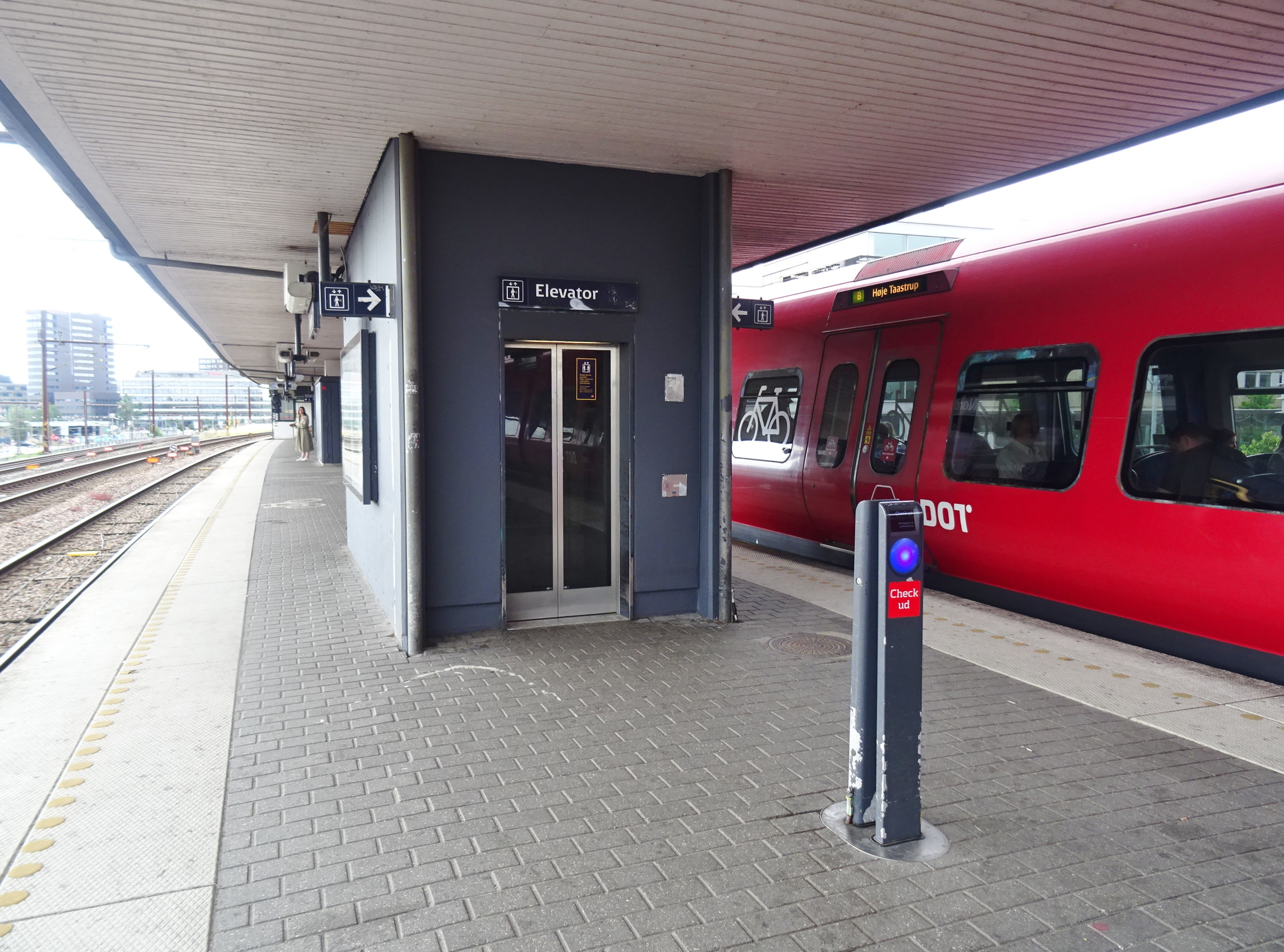
Elevator from the northern entrance

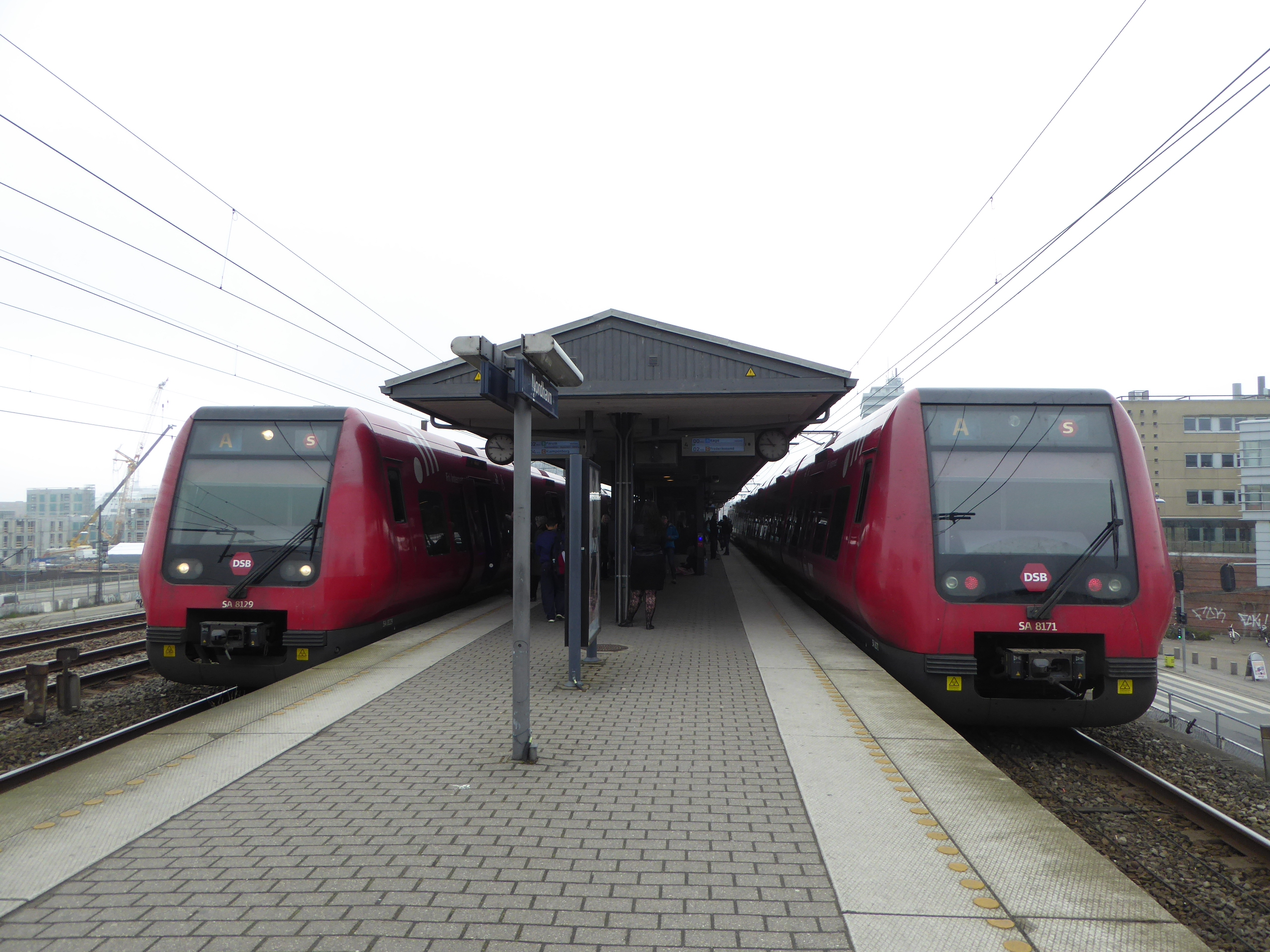
Two S-trains of the A-line at the station

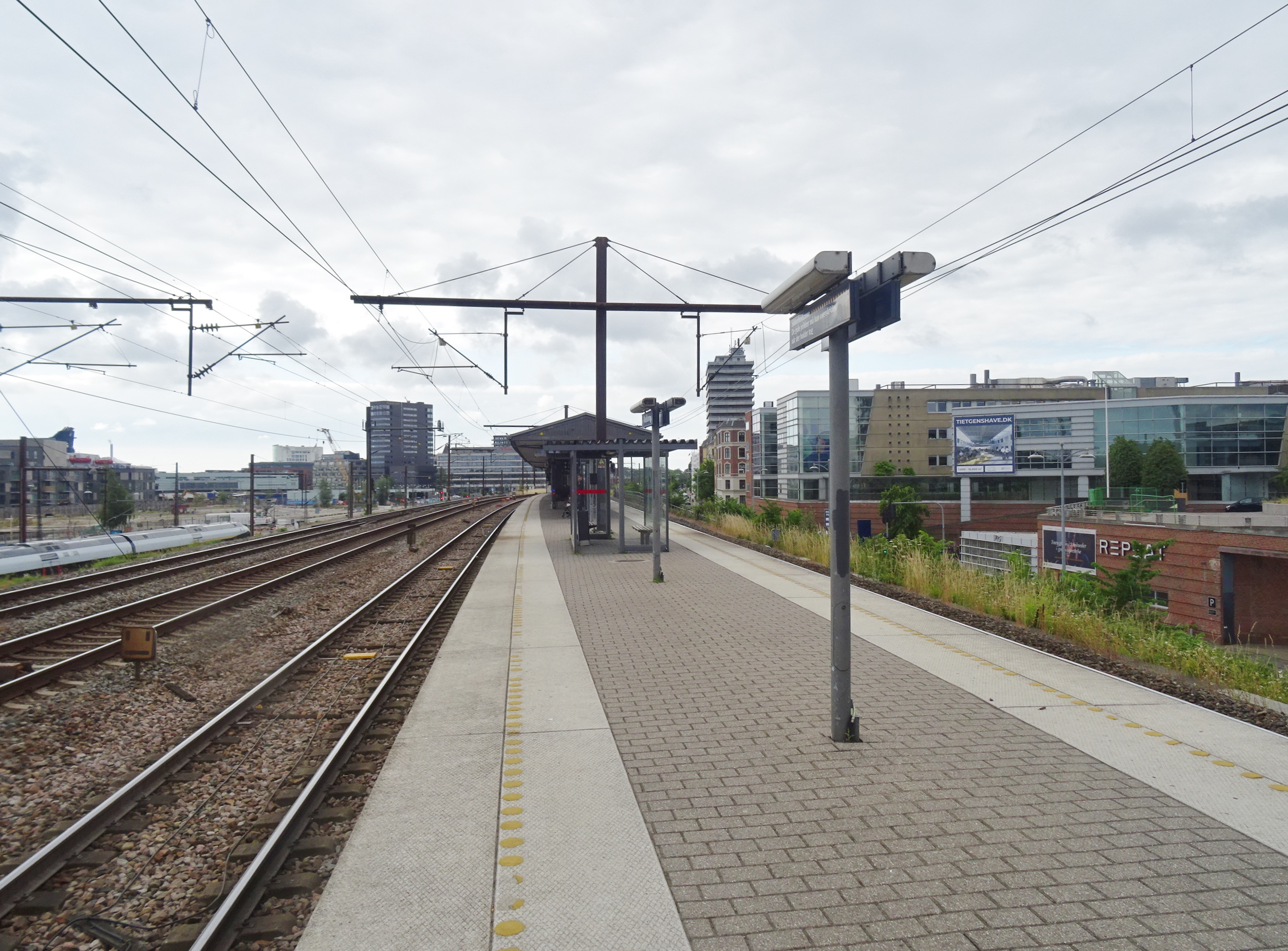
The northern part of the S-train platform

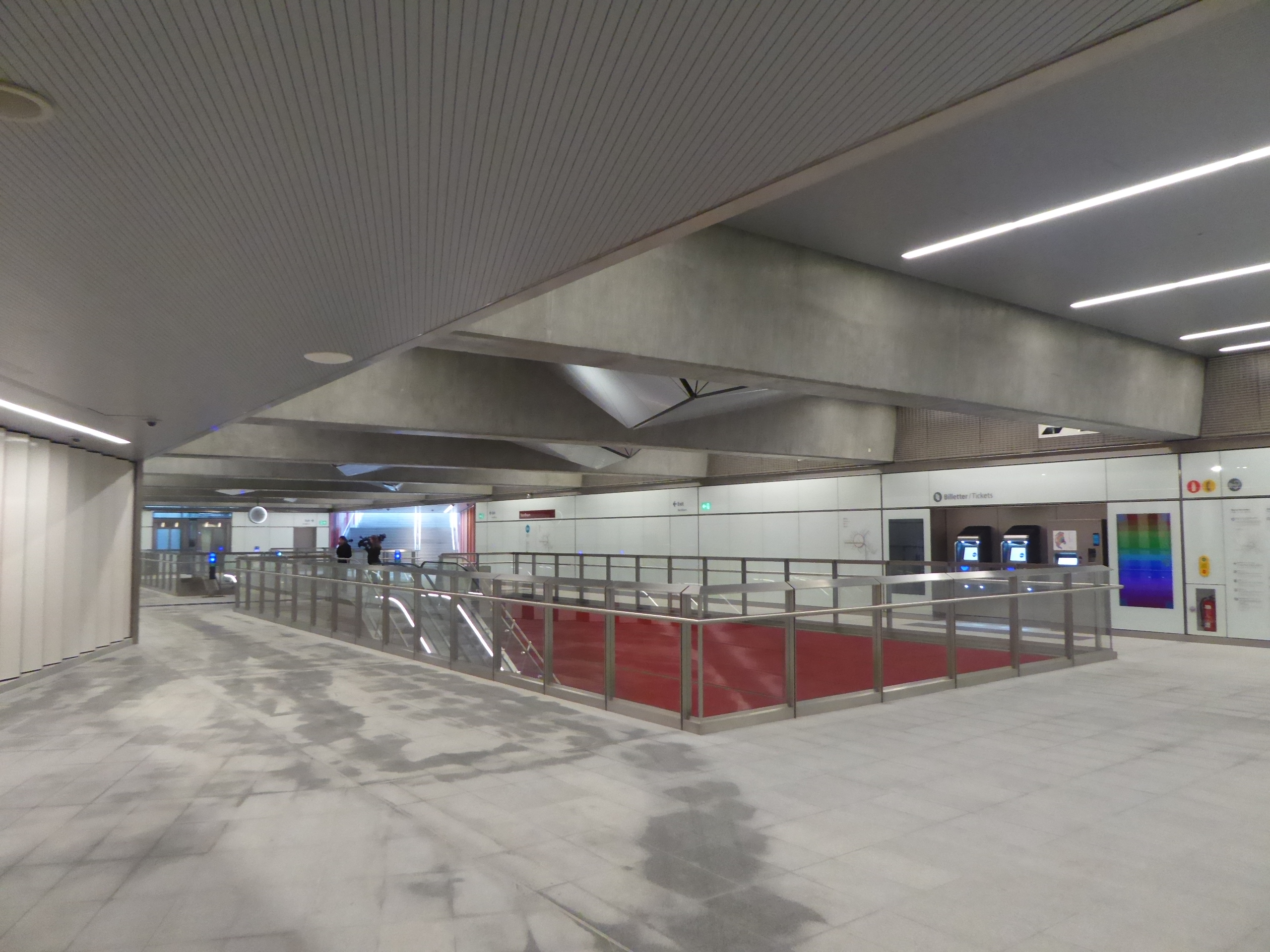
Upper deck of the metro station

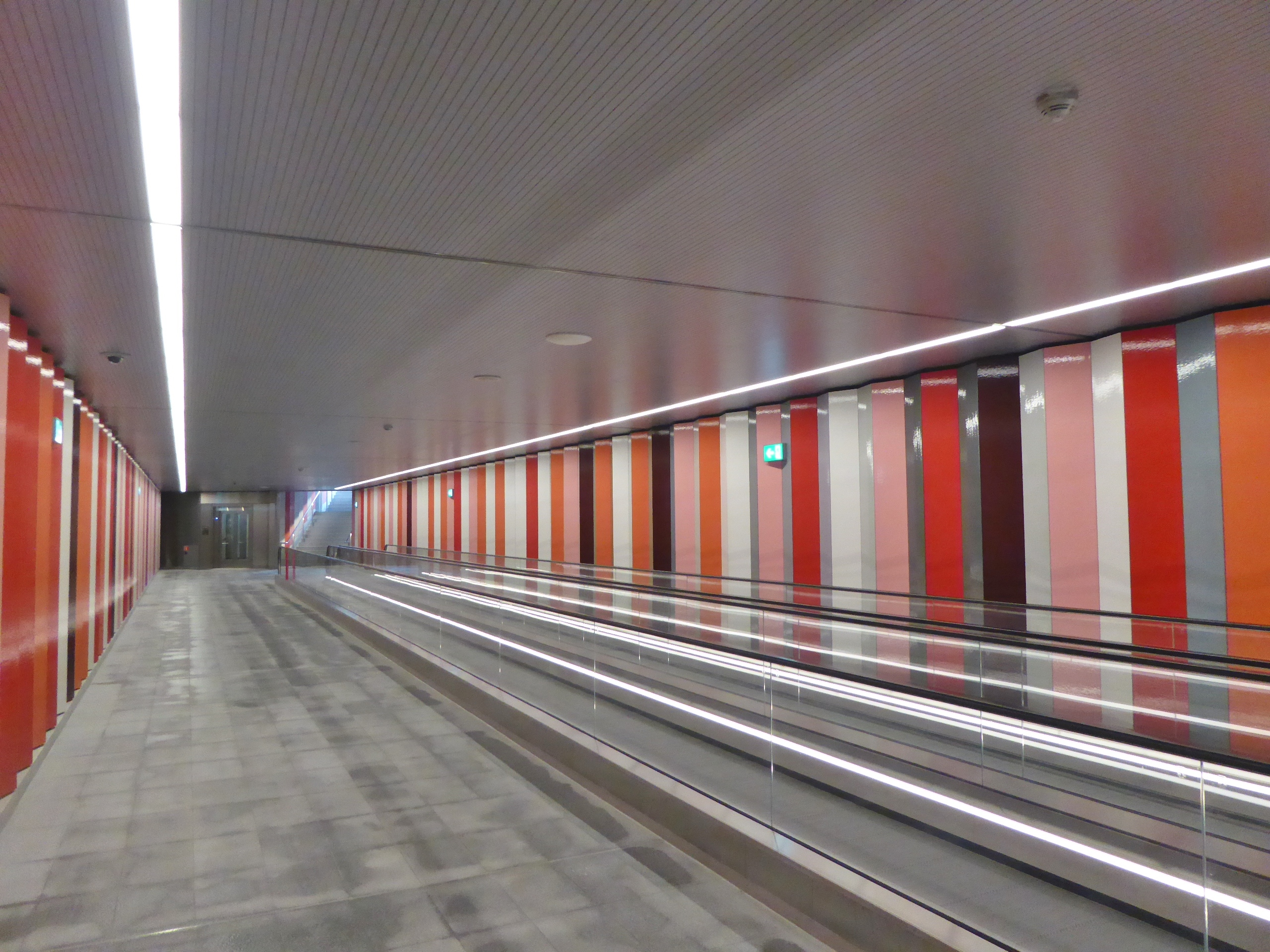
Underpass with moving walkway under Kalkbrænderihavnsgade

== See also ==
- List of Copenhagen Metro stations
- List of Copenhagen S-train stations
- List of railway stations in Denmark
- Rail transport in Denmark
- Transportation in Copenhagen
- Transportation in Denmark
