= Portland Towers =

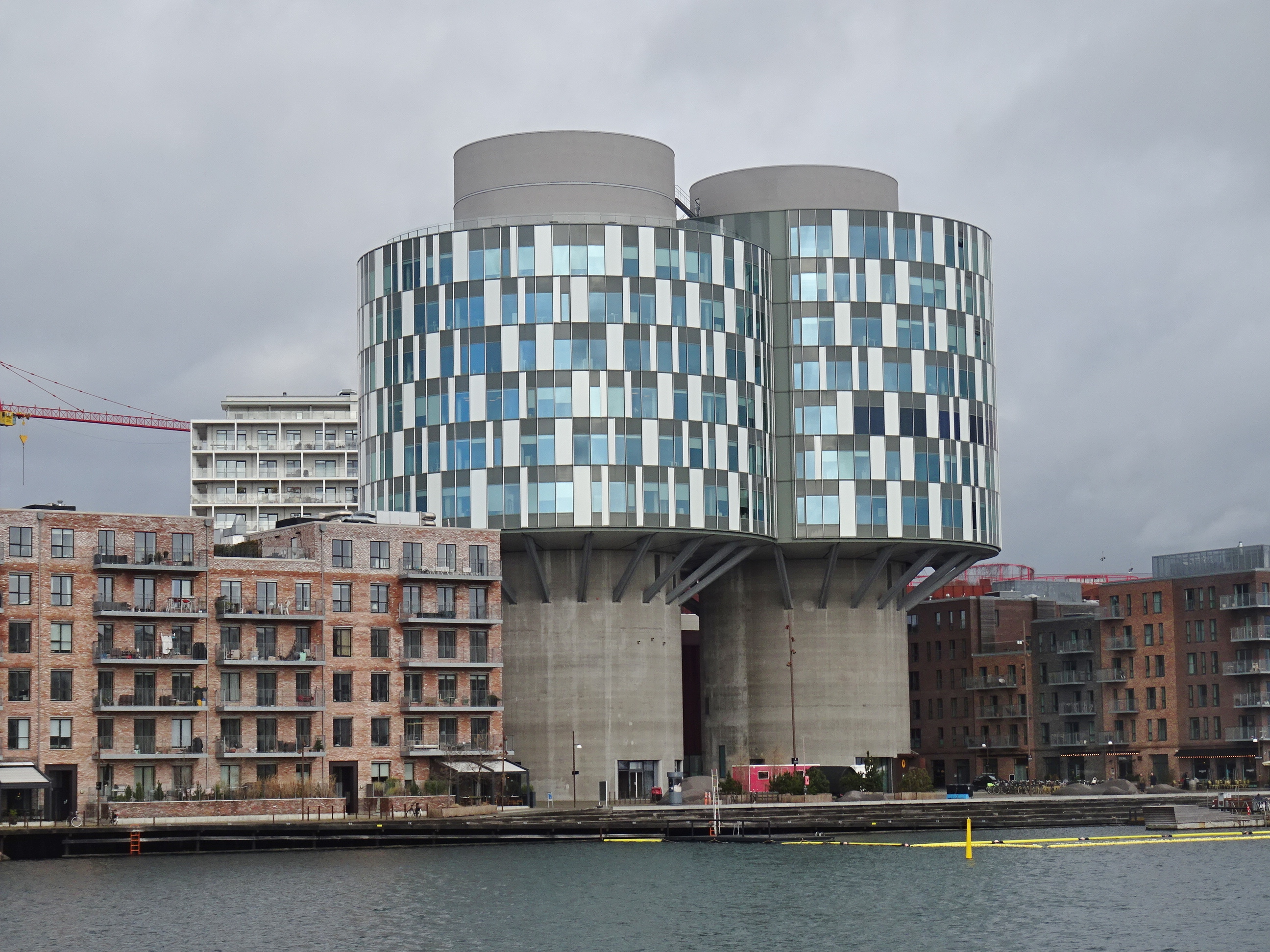
- Portland Towers
- Interactive map of the Portland Towers area

General information
- Type: Office building
- Architectural style: Modern
- Location: Nordhavn
- Coordinates: 55°42′25″N 12°35′49″E
- Current tenants: Dansk Standard
- Construction started: 1979 (the silos)
- Completed: 2013–14
- Owner: ATP Ejendomme, PFA Pension, Pensiondanmark

Height
- Height: 59 m

Technical details
- Structural system: Reinforced concrete
- Floor count: 7
- Floor area: 11,200 square metres (121,000 sq ft)

Design and construction
- Architect: Design Group Architects
- Main contractor: NCC Property Development

Portland towers are two former Aalborg Portland silos which have been converted into a BREEAM-certified office building in the emerging Nordhavn district of Copenhagen, Denmark. The conversion was completed in 2014 to design by Design Group Architects.

== History ==
Sandkaj (Sand Quay) was built in connection with an extension to the Freeport of Copenhagen in the 1950s and 1960s. The silos were built in 1979 by Aalborg Portland for the storage of cement. They were converted into an office building by NCC Property Development in 2013–14 with ATP Ejendomme, PFA Pension and Pensiondanmark as investors. The project was designed by Design Group Architects.

== Design ==
The seven floors were constructed on the exterior of the two silos. The interior of the silos contain reception, stairs and elevators. The lowest of the seven floors is located 24 metres above the ground. The design resembles that of Gemini Residences at the Islands Brygge waterfront.

== Tenants and facilities ==
The individual tenancies vary in size from 500 to 1,500 square metres. On the top floor is a canteen and a rooftop terrace.

The first tenant in the building was Dansk Standard. They have later been joined by PA Consulting, the corporate finance consultant FIH Partners samt and the law firm Brockstedt-Kaalund. Since February 2018 the building is also home to the German embassy in Copenhagen.
