= Pakhus 48 =

Building in Copenhagen, Denmark

Coordinates: 55.7089°N 12.6032°E

Pakhus 48 is a former warehouse of the Free Port of Copenhagen, Denmark, now housing showrooms for a number of design and furniture companies. Owned by Copenhagen City and Port, the building has an area of 3,000 square metres.

== Companies ==
Companies with showrooms in the building are:

- Fritz Hansen
- Kvadrat
- Erik Jørgensen
- Grid
- VOLA
- Montana
- Luceplan
