= Nordhavn, Copenhagen =

Harbour area in Copenhagen, Denmark

Coordinates: 55.716°N 12.606°E

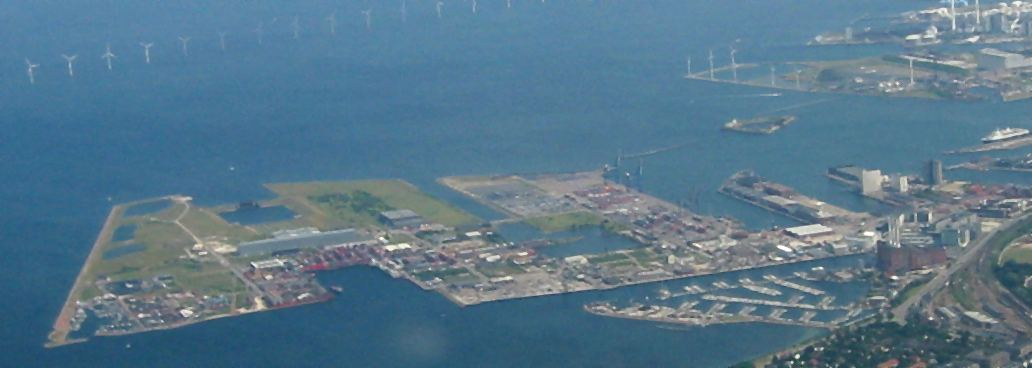
Aerial view of Nordhavn, before expansion

Nordhavnen, or Nordhavn, is a harbour area at the coast of the Øresund, founded at the end of the 19th century in Copenhagen, Denmark. It covers an area of more than 2km.

Today, most of Copenhagen Harbour's traditional activities are situated in Nordhavn, including ferry berths, a container terminal, marina, and industrial companies.

The train station Nordhavn station is located at Nordhavnen close to the city district Østerbro.

== Nordhavn city district ==
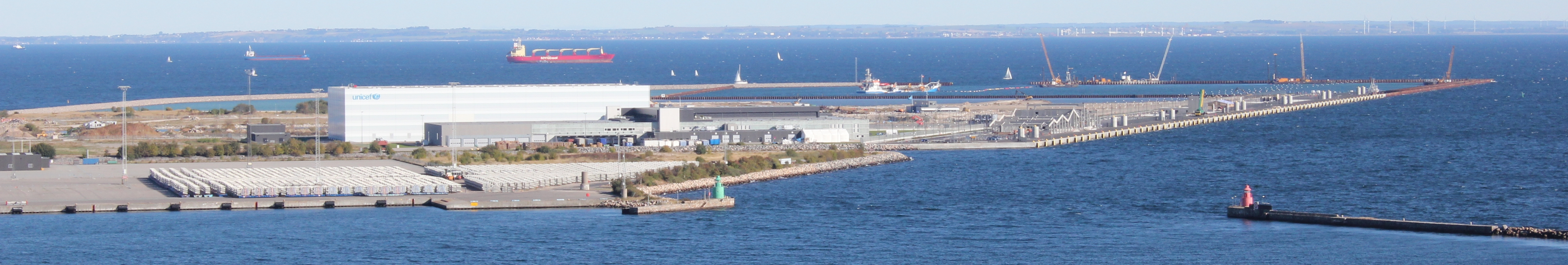
Nordhavn viewed from Langelinie, after expansion

Nordhavn translates into North Harbour and is a district of Copenhagen. Nordhavn is located in the old industrial harbour area and has been redeveloped. Nordhavn consists of urban islands connected by pedestrian friendly roads that incorporate cyclist expressways. This district is planned to become the largest metropolitan development in northern Europe. The agency By og Havn has proposed plans to develop Nordhavn as a new city district that would have 40,000 residents and 40,000 jobs. In December 2024 Nordhavn had about 6000 residents. The urban planners of Nordhavn city district have courted controversy when proposing a 15-minute city where cars are not welcome.

The agency By og Havn has started the 668 million DKK expansion of Nordhavn into Øresund. The project is the largest construction job in Denmark in 2013 and the largest consumer of steel in Northern Europe; 28,000 tonnes of steel is used for pile driving the sheet piles of the perimeter, and the area is being filled with 7 million tonnes of clean earth and 11 million tonnes of polluted earth from the City Circle Line metro and other projects until around year 2022–2025. The City Circle Line is extending into Nordhavn with at least one station.

== Cruise ship quay ==
The cruise ship quay is 1,100m long with 3 passenger terminals.

== UN City campus ==
In 2013, the United Nations campus UN City opened at the eastern part of Marmormolen in the Nordhavn area. The project will include most of the present UN activities in Copenhagen.

== Cultural references ==
Skudehavnsvej in Nordhavn is used as a location at 0:37:24 and 0:47:14 in the 1977 Olsen-banden film The Olsen Gang Outta Sight.

== See also ==
- Pakhus 48
- Portland Towers
- The Silo
