= Orientkaj station =

Metro station in Copenhagen, Denmark

Orientkaj
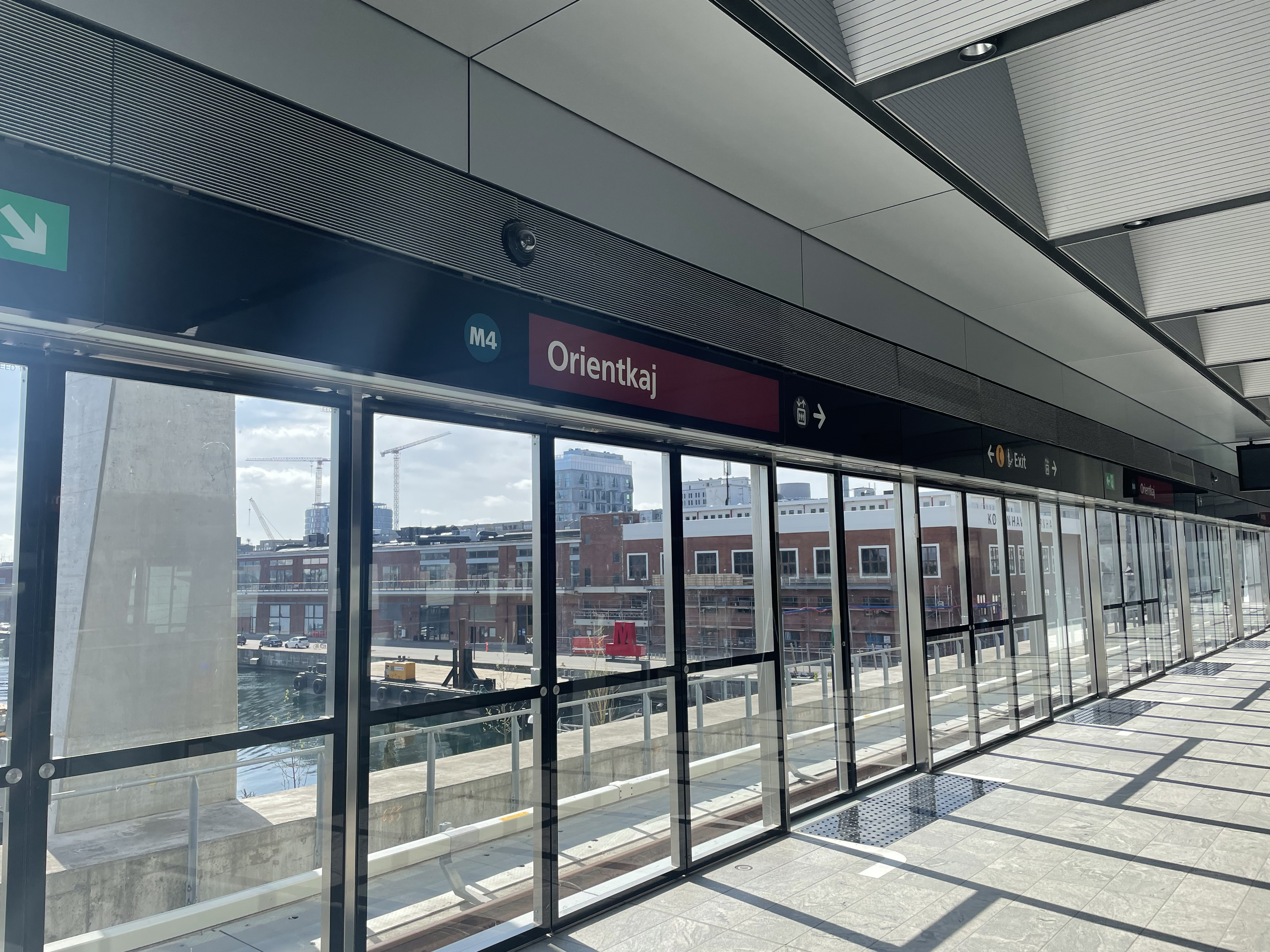

General information
- Location: Klubiensvej, 2150 Nordhavn; Copenhagen Municipality; Denmark
- Coordinates: 55.7119°N 12.5952°E
- System: Copenhagen Metro rapid transit station
- Platforms: 1 island platform
- Tracks: 2

Construction
- Structure type: Elevated
- Accessible: yes

Other information
- Station code: Orc
- Fare zone: 1

History
- Opened: 28 March 2020; 6 years ago
Location

Orientkaj station is an above-ground Copenhagen Metro station acting as the terminus of line M4 in Copenhagen, Denmark. The station is in fare zone 1, and serves the Oceankaj Cruise Terminal and surrounding area. The station is next to a pier acting as the northern terminus for Route 991/992 of the Copenhagen Harbour Buses public ferry bus service.

== Architecture ==
The station was built with a white colour scheme throughout, in keeping with the newly built development it serves which has been called Den Hvide By (translates to 'The White City').

== History ==
The station was opened in March 2020.

== Service ==
| Preceding station | Copenhagen Metro | Following station |
|---|---|---|
| Nordhavn towards Copenhagen South | M4 | Terminus |
