= Copenhagen Metro =

Rapid transit railway in Copenhagen, Denmark

- A Metro train on approach to Ørestad station

Overview
- Native name: Københavns Metro
- Owner: Metroselskabet I/S
- Locale: Copenhagen, Denmark
- Transit type: Light rapid transit
- Number of lines: 4 (1 planned)
- Line number: M1, M2, M3, M4, M5 (planned)
- Number of stations: 44
- Daily ridership: 360,000 (daily)
- Annual ridership: 135 million (2025)
- Chief executive: Carsten Riis, CEO
- Website: M.dk

Operation
- Began operation: 19 October 2002; 24 years ago
- Operators: Metro Service A/S (owned by Azienda Trasporti Milanesi)
- Number of vehicles: 34 AnsaldoBreda Driverless Metro (M1+M2); 30 Hitachi Rail Italy Driverless Metro (M3+M4)
- Train length: 3 cars
- Headway: 2–4 minutes

Technical
- System length: 43.3 km (26.9 mi)
- Track gauge: 1,435 mm (4 ft 8 1/2 in) standard gauge
- Electrification: 750 V DC third rail
- Average speed: 40 km/h (25 mph)
- Top speed: M1 and M2: 80 km/h (50 mph); M3 and M4: 90 km/h (56 mph)
System map
- In the upper part of the diagram (above Christianshavn) up and down correspond roughly to east and west, respectively; in the remaining part — to north and south. Vanløse is located to the west. København S is located to the south of København H. The Circle Line is served on the whole loop as M3 and additionally on its eastern (lower) part between Orientkaj and København H as M4. In 2024 the M4 was extended to København S.

The Copenhagen Metro (Danish: Københavns Metro [kʰøpm̩ˈhɑwˀns ˈme̝ːtsʰʁo]) is a light rapid transit system in Copenhagen, Denmark, serving the municipalities of Copenhagen, Frederiksberg, and Tårnby.

First opened in October 2002, the driverless light metro supplements the larger S-train rapid transit system, and is integrated with local DSB and regional (Øresundståg) trains and municipal Movia buses. The metro operates 4 lines and 44 stations, 30 of which are underground. The M1 and M2 lines serve western and eastern Amager (including Copenhagen Airport) respectively, sharing a common line between the city centre and Vanløse. The M3 is a wholly underground circular line connecting Copenhagen Central Station with Vesterbro, Frederiksberg, Nørrebro, Østerbro and Indre By. The most recent line, M4, supplements the M3 line and connects it to Nordhavn and Sydhavn, as well as Valby via Copenhagen South. The fifth line, M5, is currently in the planning stages and will serve Refshaleøen as well as the under-construction Lynetteholmen neighbourhood, with the first section expected to open in 2036.

In 2025, the metro carried 135 million passengers. Along with the New York City Subway and Chicago "L", the Copenhagen Metro is one of three rapid transit systems in the world to operate 24/7 throughout their city limits.

== Overview ==
The system is owned by Metroselskabet (The Metro Company), which is owned by the municipalities of Copenhagen and Frederiksberg, and the Ministry of Transport. The M1 and M2 use 34 trains of the Hitachi Rail Italy Driverless Metro class and stationed at the Control and Maintenance Center at Vestamager. The trains are 2.65 m (8 ft 8 in) wide and three cars long; their 630 kW (840 hp) power output is supplied by a 750-volt third rail. The metro trains were originally planned to be four cars long, but trains were reduced to three cars per set as a savings measure. Platforms are – although shorter than originally planned – built to accommodate trains with four cars, and the automatic doors can be modified accordingly should the need arise.

Operation of the system is subcontracted to a private company. For the history of service, this has been Metro Service A/S. Trains run continually, twenty-four hours a day, with the headway varying from two to four minutes in daytime, with longer intervals (up to twenty minutes) during the night.

Planning of the Metro started in 1992 as part of the redevelopment plans for Ørestad with construction starting in 1996, and stage 1, from Nørreport to Vestamager and Lergravsparken, opened in 2002. Stage 2, from Nørreport to Vanløse, opened in 2003, followed by stage 3, from Lergravsparken to Lufthavnen, in 2007.

The City Circle Line (Danish: Cityringen) is an entirely underground 15.5 km (9.6 mi) loop through central Copenhagen and Frederiksberg with 17 stops. It does not share any track with the M1 and M2 lines, but intersect them at Kongens Nytorv and Frederiksberg stations. Before the Cityringen opened, the Metro expected that it would cause its ridership should almost double from its 2016 levels to 116 million annual passengers.

A fourth line, M4, operates as an extension of the M3 to Nordhavn and Sydhavn. The first station opened in Nordhavn in March 2020, and the five-stop, 4.5 km (2.8 mi), extension to Sydhavn opened in 2024. The M4 terminates at Copenhagen South Station and serves as another metro connection to the S-train network, regional trains, and long-distance trains on the current lines and the high speed Copenhagen-Ringsted railway. The Copenhagen Metro is expected by Metroselskabet to triple the ridership from its current level of 200,000 per weekday to 600,000 per weekday by 2030.

== History ==
=== Background ===
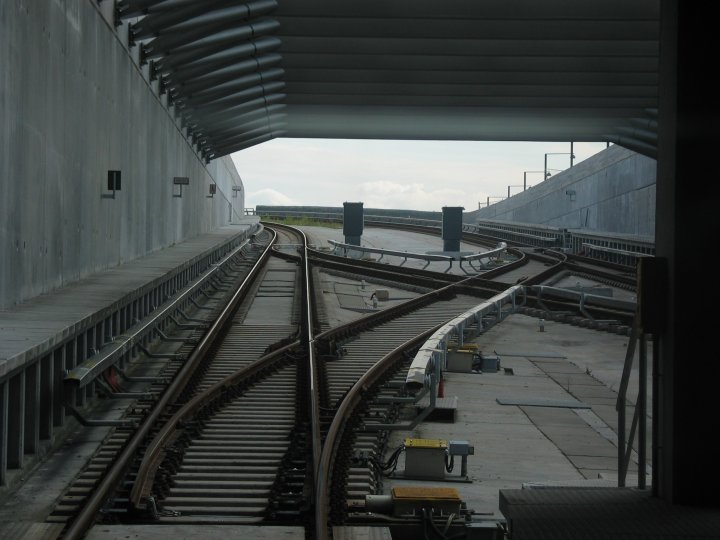
Crossover from elevated railway to tunnel near Islands Brygge

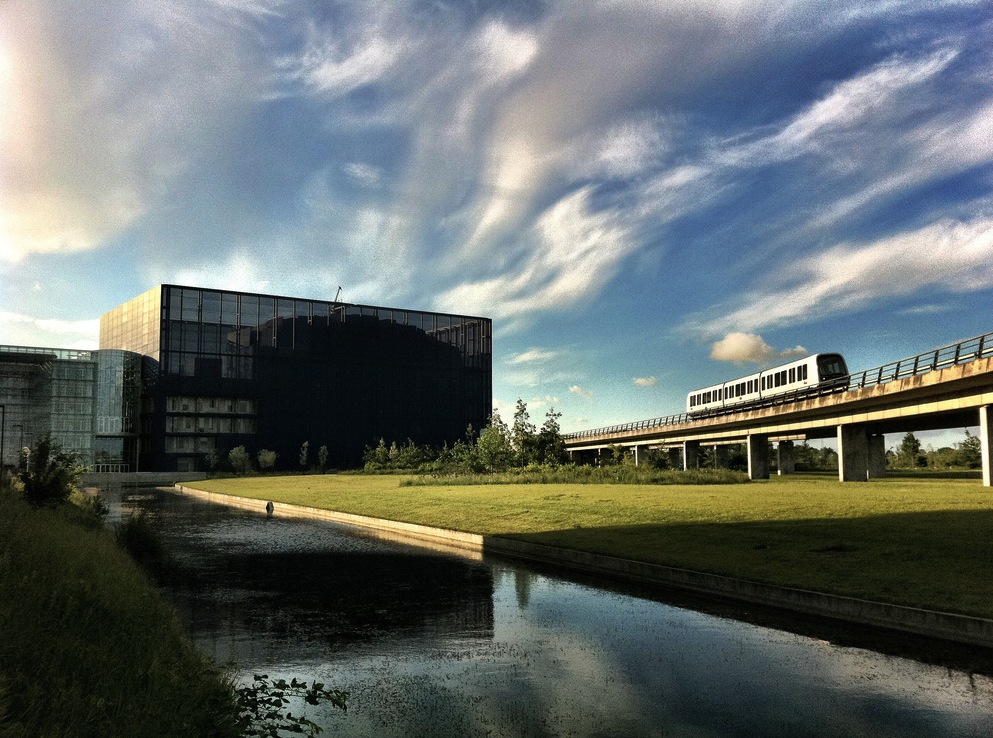
Copenhagen Metro train, with DR Byen in the background

The planning of the metro was spurred by the development of the Ørestad area of Copenhagen. The principle of building a rail transit was passed by the Parliament of Denmark on 24 June 1992, with the Ørestad Act. The responsibility for developing the area, as well as building and operating the metro, was given to the Ørestad Development Corporation, a joint venture between Copenhagen Municipality (45%) and the Ministry of Finance (55%). Initially, three modes were considered: a tramway, a light rail and a rapid transit. In October 1994, the Development Corporation chose a light rapid transit.

The tram solution would have been a street tram, without any major infrastructure investments in the city centre, such as a dedicated right-of-way. Through Ørestad it would have had level crossings, except for a grade-separated crossing with the European Route E20 and the Øresund Line. It would have had a driver and have operated at about a 150-second interval—twice the cycle time of the city's traffic lights. Power would have been provided with overhead wires. Stops were to be located about every 500 metres (550 yd) at street level. The articulated trams would have been about 35 metres (115 ft) long and have a capacity for 230 passengers.

The light rail model would have used the same approach as the tram in Ørestad, but would instead have run through a tunnel in the city centre. The tunnel sections would be shorter, but the diameter larger because it would have to accommodate overhead wires. The system would have the same frequency as the tram, but use double trams and would therefore require larger stations. The metro solution was chosen because it combined the highest average speeds, the highest passenger capacity, the lowest visual and noise impact, and the lowest number of accidents. Despite requiring the highest investment, it had the highest net present value.

The decision to build stage 2, from Nørreport to Vanløse, and stage 3, to the airport, was taken by Parliament on 21 December 1994. Stage 2 involved the establishment of the company Frederiksbergbaneselskabet I/S in February 1995, owned 70% by the Ørestad Development Corporation and 30% by Frederiksberg Municipality. The third stage would be built by Østamagerbaneselskabet I/S, established in September 1995 and owned 55% by the Ørestad Development Corporation and 45% by Copenhagen County. In October 1996, a contract was signed with the Copenhagen Metro Construction Group (COMET) for building the lines (Civil Works), and with Ansaldo STS for delivery of technological systems and trains, and to operate the system the first five years. COMET was a single-purpose consortium composed of Astaldi, Bachy, SAE, Ilbau, NCC Rasmussen & Schiøtz Anlæg and Tarmac Construction.

=== Construction of lines M1 and M2 ===
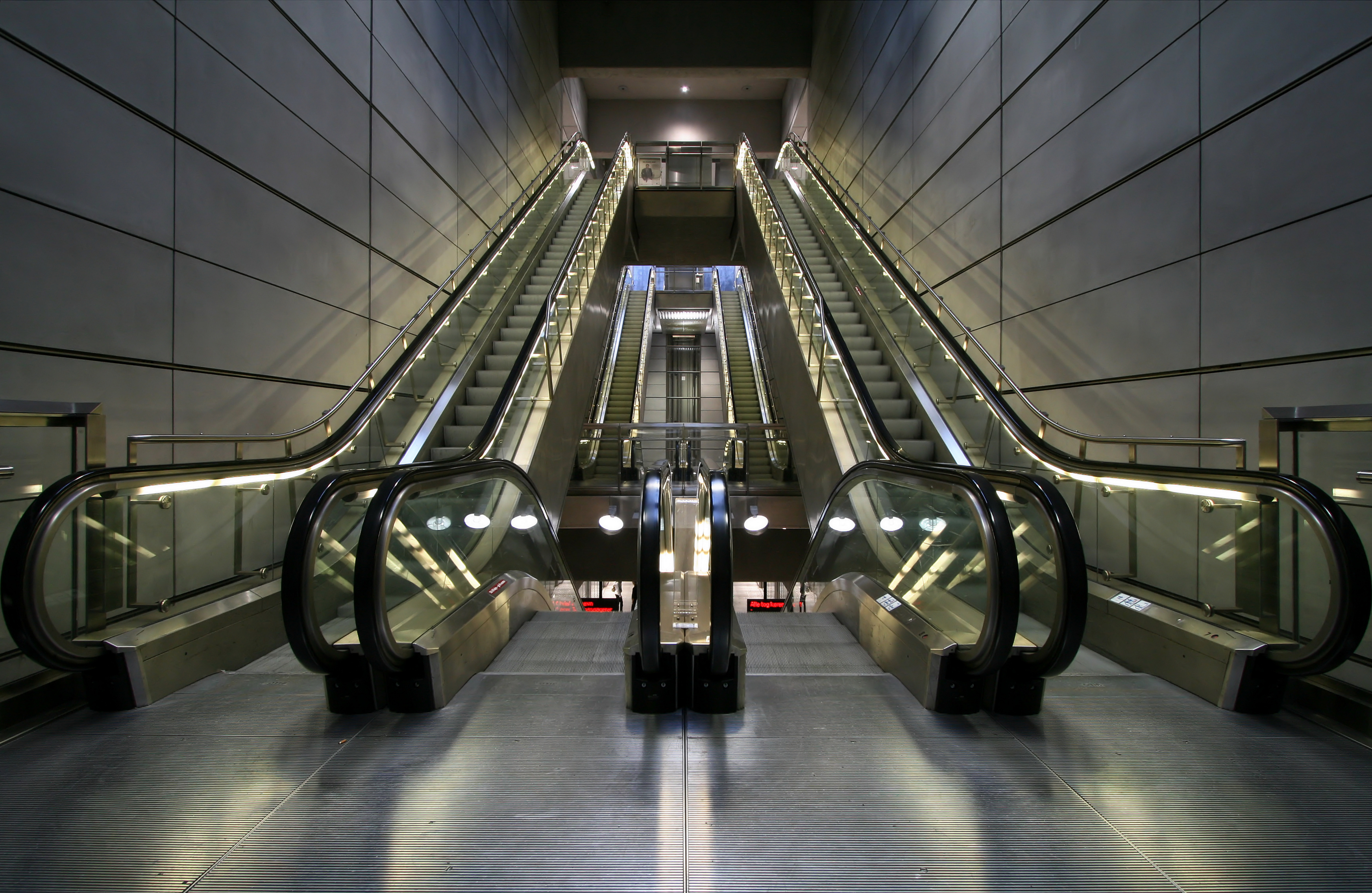
Escalators at Amagerbro Station

Construction started in November 1996, with the moving of underground pipes and wires around the station areas. In August 1997, work started at the depot, and in September, COMET started the first mainline work. In October and November, the two tunnel boring machines (TBM), christened Liva and Betty, were delivered. They started boring each barrel of the tunnel from Islands Brygge in February 1998. The same month, the Public Transport Authority gave the necessary permits to operate a driverless metro. The section between Fasanvej and Frederiksberg is a former S-train line, and was last operated as such on 20 June 1998.

The first section of tunnel was completed in September 1998, and the TBMs moved to Havnegade. By December 1998, work had started on the initial nine stations. Plans for M2 were presented to the public in April 1999, with a debate emerging if the proposed elevated solution was the best. In May, the first trains were delivered, and trial runs began at the depot. In December, the tunnels were completed to Strandlodsvej, and the TBMs were moved to Havnegade, where they started to grind towards Frederiksberg. From 1 January 2000, the S-train service from Solbjerg to Vanløse was terminated, and work commenced to rebuild the section to metro. The last section of tunnel was completed in February 2001.

In March 2001, Copenhagen County Council decided to start construction of stage 3. On 6 November 2001, the first train operated through a tunnel section. On 28 November, laying of tracks along stage 1, and stage 2A from Nørreport to Frederiksberg, was completed. An agreement about financing stage 3 was reached on 12 April. By 22 May, the 18 delivered trains had test-run 100,000 km (62,000 miles). The section from Nørreport to Lergravsparken and Vestamager was opened on 19 October 2002. Initially, the system had a 12-minute headway on each of the two services. From 3 December this was reduced to 9 minutes, and from 19 December to 6 minutes. Operation of the system was subcontracted to Ansaldo, who again subcontracted it to Metro Service, a subsidiary of Serco. The contract had a duration of five years, with an option for extension for another three.

=== Opening of lines M1 and M2 ===
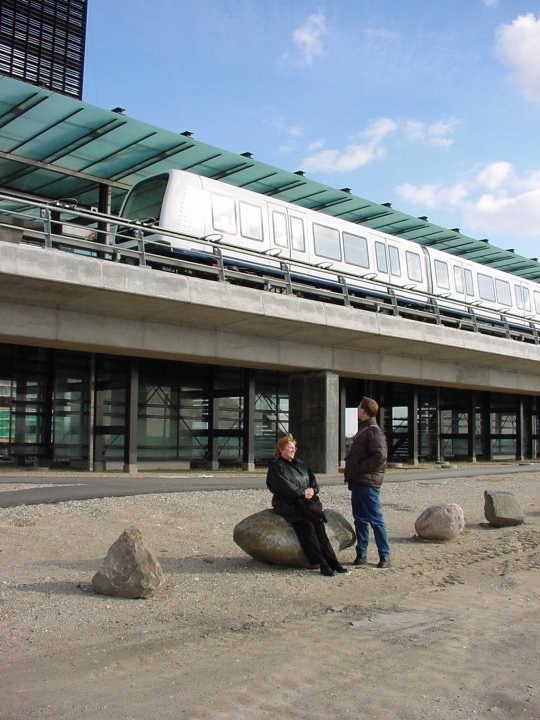
Elevated station on Amager – Ørestad Station

Trial runs on stage 2A began on 24 February 2003 and opened on 29 May. All changes to bus and train schedules in Copenhagen took place on 25 May, but to allow Queen Margrethe II to open the line, the opening needed to be adapted to her calendar. This caused four days without a bus service along the line. Stage 2B, from Frederiksberg to Vanløse, opened on 12 October.

Forum Station was nominated for the European Union Prize for Contemporary Architecture in 2005. On 2 December 2005, the final agreement to build the City Circle Line was made between the local and national governments. The price was estimated at 11.5 to 18.3 billion Danish krone (DKK), of which DKK 5.4 billion will be financed though ticket sales, and the remaining from the state and municipalities. In 2006, it was announced that the contract with Ansaldo to operate the metro had been prolonged another three years. However, the subcontract between Ansaldo and Serco was not extended, and the contract was instead given to Azienda Trasporti Milanesi in joint venture with Ansaldo; they took over operations from October 2007. The Ørestad Development Corporation was discontinued in 2007, and the ownership of the metro was transferred to Metroselskabet I/S.

In January 2007, the city council decided that a branch was to be built during construction at Nørrebro, to allow a future branch line from the City Circle Line towards Brønshøj. The first part of this line was intended to be constructed at the same time as the City Circle Line, to avoid a multitude-higher construction cost and long interruptions of operations later. This did not involve a final decision, only an option for future construction. The Herlev/Brønshøj line was ultimately dropped as the City of Copenhagen withdrew its share of the cost of the Nørrebro branch chamber in its 2009 budget, and the state refused to continue the project. Any branch to the Herlev / Brønshøj region would now require a shutdown of the City Circle Line for an extended period of time.

In March 2007, a proposal to establish a station at Valby, where the Carlsberg Group is planning an urban redevelopment, was scrapped. The proposal would have increased construction costs by DKK 900 million and was deemed not economical. The increased cost was, in part, due to an extra TBM being needed to complete the project on time. The City Circle Line was passed by parliament on 1 June 2007, with only the Red–Green Alliance voting in disfavor.

The 4.5 km (2.8-mile) stage 3 opened on 28 September 2007, from Lergravsparken to the airport. It followed, for the most part, the route of the former Amager Line of the Danish State Railways. With this stage complete, the 34 trains were delivered for use by the M1 and M2. However, the line caused a heated debate, with several locals organized themselves into the Amager Metro Group. The group argued that the line should have been built underground, citing concerns that it would create noise pollution and a physical barrier in Amager. In April 2008, the Copenhagen Metro won the award at MetroRail 2008 for the world's best metro. The jury noted the system's high regularity, safety and passenger satisfaction, as well as the efficient transport to the airport. During 2008, the metro experienced a 16% passenger growth to 44 million passengers per year.

Several parties agreed in September 2008 not to fund a northwest expansion of the metro.

Initially, the system operated trains from 01:00 to 05:00 only on Thursdays to Saturdays, but, starting on 19 March 2009, night service was extended to the rest of the week. This caused a logistical challenge, because Metro Service used the nights for maintenance. The routes were therefore set up in such a way that the system could be operated on only a single track, leaving the other free for work. In May 2009, six companies were pre-qualified to bid for the public service obligation to operate the metro. These were Serco/NedRailways, Ansaldo STS, Arriva, S-Bahn Hamburg, Keolis and DSB Metro—a joint venture between DSB and RATP. The process was delayed because of a procedural error by Metroselskabet, who failed to pre-qualify DSB Metro.

=== Construction of lines M3, City Circle line and M4, the Harbour Line ===
Diagram of Copenhagen Metro following the opening of the northern part of the M4 (2020)

An expansion of the metro, the City Circle Line, opened on 29 September 2019. Independent of the existing system, it circles the city centre and connects the areas of Østerbro, Nørrebro and Vesterbro to Frederiksberg and Indre By. The line is 15.5 km (9.6 miles) long and runs entirely in the tunnel. The circle has 17 stations, two of which are interchanges with both the M1 and M2 lines and three Copenhagen S-train stations. It takes 25 minutes to complete a full lap in either direction. Archaeological and geological surveys started in 2007, preferred bidders were announced in November 2010, and contracts were signed in 2011. Preparations began by moving utilities, etc., in 2010, and construction of work sites and stations began in 2011. Drilling of tunnels began in 2013. On 7 January 2011, the new project called Cityringen started with the signing of new contracts by Metroselskabet, with Ansaldo Breda and Ansaldo Sts (Finmeccanica Group) for the supply of trains and control systems, and with an Italian joint-venture led by Salin Construttori (about 60%) and Tecnimont (about 40%) with Seli as third partner for the construction part. In July 2013, Natur- og Miljøklagenævnet, the environmental appeals board, ruled that the city was wrong to grant Metroselskabet permission for 24-hour work days and noise levels of up to 78 dB at the Marmorkirken site. This forced construction to stop work at 6 PM until a final ruling was made, thus delaying the completion date.

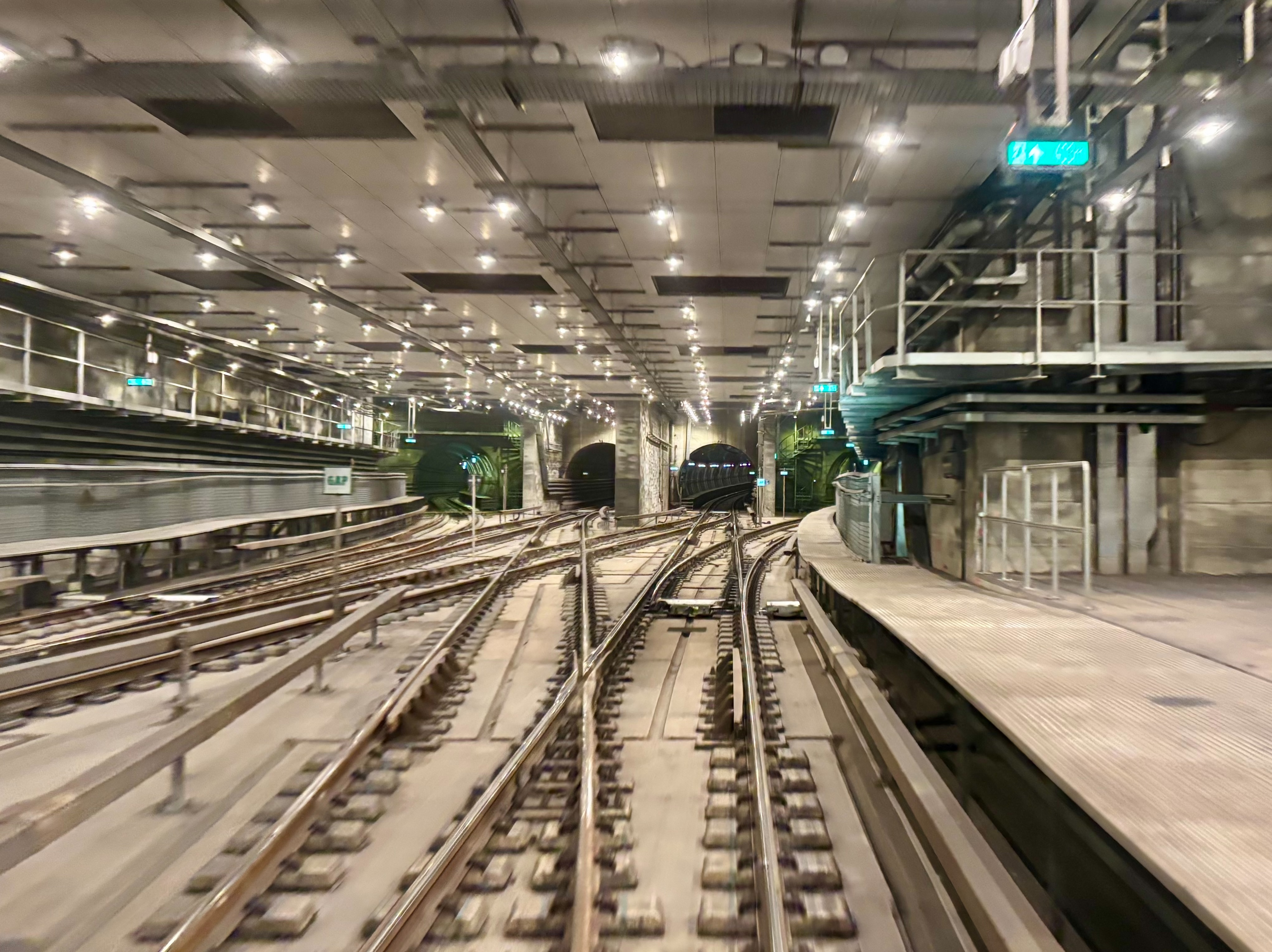
Underground junction of the M3 and M4 lines. The tunnels in the middle are for the M3 line, and the outer tunnels for the M4 line.

Lines M3 and M4 serve the City Circle Line. The M3 opened on 29 September 2019, and its trains operate on the entire circle in either direction. The M3 has transfers to M1 and M2 at Frederiksberg and Kongens Nytorv. The line is estimated to carry 240,000 daily passengers, bringing the metro's total daily ridership to 460,000.

The M4 was opened on 28 March 2020 when two additional stations were opened in the Nordhavn district. This line runs from Copenhagen Central Station (København H) via Østerport to Orientkaj station in Nordhavn, thus sharing six stations with the M3 and featuring two additional Nordhavn stations. The M4 line is interchange with the M1 and M2 at Kongens Nytorv.

An extension to the Sydhavn district opened on 22 June 2024, served by the M4. The addition of this line relocated the M4's southern terminus from Copenhagen Central Station to København Syd.

==== Evolution of plans ====
A northwestern expansion of the City Circle Line was planned, where M4 would have diverted at Nørrebro and run to the suburbs of Brønshøj and Gladsaxe. This project was abandoned, as the interchange chamber between any such line and the City Circle Line was scrapped as part of the City of Copenhagen's 2009 budget. In subsequent plans, the northern extension of the M4 was instead relocated as a Nordhavn branch which connects with the City Circle Line at Østerport. The Nordhavn extension with two stations opened on 28 March 2020. The southern extension of the M4 will run from Copenhagen Central Station through Sydhavn to Ny Ellebjerg, where the M4 will link up with the S-train and regional train system. The Danish Transport Authority (Trafikstyrelsen) has suggested converting the F-line of the S-train network to metro standard as an M5 line. If the M5 line becomes reality, it will connect with existing lines at Flintholm Station (interchange with M1 and M2), Nørrebro station (interchange with M3), and the future Ny Ellebjerg station (interchange with M4).

The fourth line, M4 or the Harbour line, shares the track with the M3 between Copenhagen Central Station and Østerport station (six stations shared). An additional extension to the M4 is under construction: service the southern (Sydhavn) harbour district in Copenhagen. The completed M4 between Orientkaj and Ny Ellebjerg will feature 13 stations.

The northern extension, Nordhavn station and Orientkaj station, both began service on 28 March 2020. The southern extension will add five additional stops to the M4, with its southern terminus moving from Copenhagen Central Station to Ny Ellebjerg. This line will service the southern harbour district and is expected to open by 2024.

As of 2019, the M1 and M2 has a total of 22 stations. After opening of the City Circle Line, the metro system is featured 3 lines with a total of 37 stations. Upon completion of both extensions of the M4, the system will feature four lines with 44 stations. 8 of these will be interchanges with the S-train.

== Future lines discussed ==
Many new lines have been discussed. Initially Line M4 was supposed to supplement the circular M3 on the eastern side of the Inner City between Nørrebro station and Copenhagen Central Station. At this time, an extension was suggested from Nørrebro to the northwestern suburbs with a terminus at Husum station. This was abandoned as the City of Copenhagen rejected funding interchange chamber under Nørrebro station necessary for this extension. Instead, the city preferred the M4 to branch at Østerport station to facilitate development of the Nordhavn harbour area.

The "M5"-label appears to having been reserved for a potential future conversion of Line F of the Copenhagen S-train to metro standard. In 2011, the City of Copenhagen suggested two additional lines M6 and M7, the M6 linking the northwestern suburbs and central Amager and the M7 forming a second ring line further east than the M3, and a western extension of the M1 or M2 to Brøndbyøster was also suggested. In 2017, the city of Copenhagen suggested a new M6 line connecting Brønshøj and Refshaleøen via Copenhagen Central Station. In 2018, the government and the city agreed on plans to construct an artificial island, Lynetteholmen north of Refshaleøen, and the city included its plans to link Copenhagen Central Station and Refshaleøen in this discussion.

As of January 2018, no further development will be done after the construction of the Harbour line, or Line M4 between Ny Ellebjerg station and Orientkaj in the Nordhavn area, except for a few more stations northeast of Orientkaj.

=== 8 Proposed Lines from September 2025 Report ===
The eight proposed metro routes:

- Vanløse St. – Tingbjerg (extension of M1/M2)
- Rigshospitalet – Herlev Hospital (new line)
- Stengade St. – Tingbjerg (branch of the M5)
- Copenhagen South – Hvidovre Hospital (extension of M4)
- Copenhagen South – Emdrup St. (extension of M4)
- Port of Tuborg – Copenhagen Airport (new line)
- Bispebjerg Hospital – Holmen (new line)
- Øresund Metro: Prague Blv. – Malmö C (new line)

=== M5 (Amagerbrogade to Refshaleøen and Lynetteholm) ===
M5 is a planned line of the Copenhagen Metro that is set to open in 2036. It will run from Copenhagen Central Station via Amagerbrogade to Refshaleøen and Lynetteholm. The line will encompass ten stations, of which five will be new. There will be a possibility of expanding the line with three more stations. The project has completed an environmental impact assessment and has received approval from the authorities.

=== Öresund Metro (to Sweden) ===
Planned Expansions

The Öresund Metro is expected to shorten travel times between Malmö and Copenhagen, strengthen labour-market integration across the Öresund region and relieve capacity pressure on the Öresund Bridge by freeing capacity for freight and long-distance trains. The City of Malmö and the City of Copenhagen have collaborated on the project for almost 15 years.

==== EU Study ====
In September 2011, the city of Copenhagen and neighbouring Malmö in Sweden announced that they were seeking European Union funding to study a potential metro line under the Øresund to the neighbourhood of Malmö Central Station, providing faster trips and additional capacity beyond that of the existing Øresund Bridge. The study, for which the EU granted funding in the following December, will consider both a simple shuttle between the two stations and a continuous line integrated with the local transport networks on each side, and they anticipate a travel time of 15 minutes between the two city centers. Work on the study is expected to continue until 2020.

==== Inclusion in Copenhagen Metro Plans ====
On 23 September 2025, Copenhagen’s Finance Committee (Økonomiudvalget) included the Öresund Metro in a report on the city’s future metro network expansion. The report proposes eight potential new metro routes, including a line connecting Malmö and Copenhagen. Produced by Metroselskabet, it assessed projected passenger volumes, climate impact, accessibility to workplaces and homes, and the required residual financing.

Ticket revenues for the Öresund Metro are estimated to cover roughly two-thirds of the project’s costs, with the remaining funding shared between Sweden and Denmark. This makes the proposal comparatively less reliant on additional public financing than several other options.

No political decision to prioritise any of the proposed routes was made at the committee meeting; further political approval will be required before the project can proceed to the next stages.

== Route ==
Map of the current Copenhagen Metro network (2024)

The metro consists of four lines, M1, M2, M3 and M4, with a planned M5 line expected to be operational in 2035. M1 and M2 share a common 7.69-kilometre (4.78 mi) section from Vanløse to Christianshavn, where they split along two lines: M1 follows the Ørestad Line to Vestamager, while M2 follows the Østamager Line to the airport. The metro consists of a total route length of 20.4 km (12.7 mi), and 22 stations, 9 of which are on the section shared by both lines. M1 is 13.9 kilometres (8.6 mi) long and serves 15 stations, while M2 is 14.2 kilometres (8.8 mi) long and serves 16 stations. About 10 km (6.2 miles) of the lines and 9 stations are in tunnel, located at 20 to 30 m (66 to 98 ft) below ground level. The remaining sections are on embankments, viaducts or at ground level.

The section from Vanløse to Frederiksberg follows the Frederiksberg Line, a former S-train line which runs on an embankment. From Fasanvej station, the line runs underground, and continues this way through the city center. After Christianshavn, the line splits in two. M1 reaches ground level at Islands Brygge, and continues on a viaduct through the Vestamager area. M2 continues in tunnel until after Lergravsparken, where it starts to follow the former Amager Line.

The tunnels consist of two parallel tunnels; that run through stable limestone at about 30 m (98 ft) depth, but are elevated slightly at each station. There are emergency exits every 600 m (660 yd), so that no train is ever further than 300 m (330 yd) from an exit. The outer tunnel diameter is 5.5 m (18 ft 1 in), while the inner diameter is 4.9 m (16 ft 1 in). The tunnels were excavated by the cut-and-cover method, the New Austrian Tunnelling method and by tunnel boring machines (TBM). Along the elevated sections, the tracks run on alternating sections of separate reinforced concrete viaducts and joint embankments made of reinforced earth. M3 is a 15.5-kilometre (9.63 mi) looping line which serves 17 stations. Including Frederiksberg and Kongens Nytorv which also serve M1 and M2. A full trip around the line takes approximately 29 minutes.

The M4 line serves 13 stations, 6 of which are shared with the M3 line. It branches off the M3 line at Østerport in the north and at København H in the south. The southern extension is the newest in the system and opened on 22 June 2024.

Copenhagen Metro lines
Line	Color		Route	Opened	Last extension	Length	Stations
M1	Green	M1 (Copenhagen)	Vanløse — Frederiksberg — Nørreport — Kongens Nytorv — Ørestad — Vestamager	2002	2003	13.1 km (8.1 mi)	15
M2	Yellow	M2 (Copenhagen)	Vanløse — Frederiksberg — Nørreport — Kongens Nytorv — Amagerbro — Lufthavnen	2002	2007	14.2 km (8.8 mi)	16
M3 (City Circle Line)	Red	City Circle Line	København H — Frederiksberg — Nørrebro — Østerport — Kongens Nytorv — København H	2019	—N/a	15.5 km (9.6 mi)	17
M4	Blue	M4 (Copenhagen)	København Syd — København H — Kongens Nytorv — Østerport — Nordhavn — Orientkaj	2020	2024	10.2 km (6.3 mi)	13

== Service ==
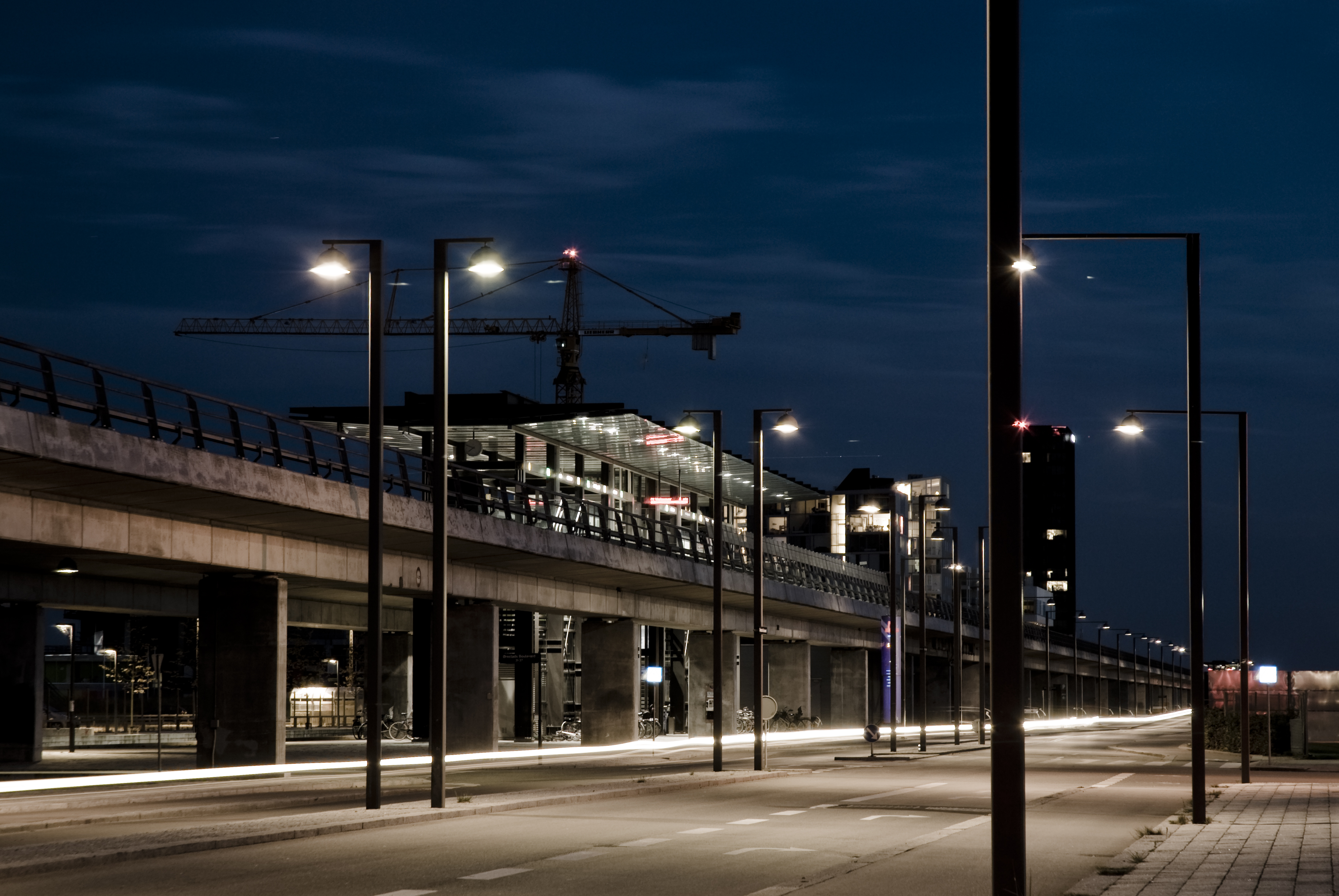
Bella Center Station

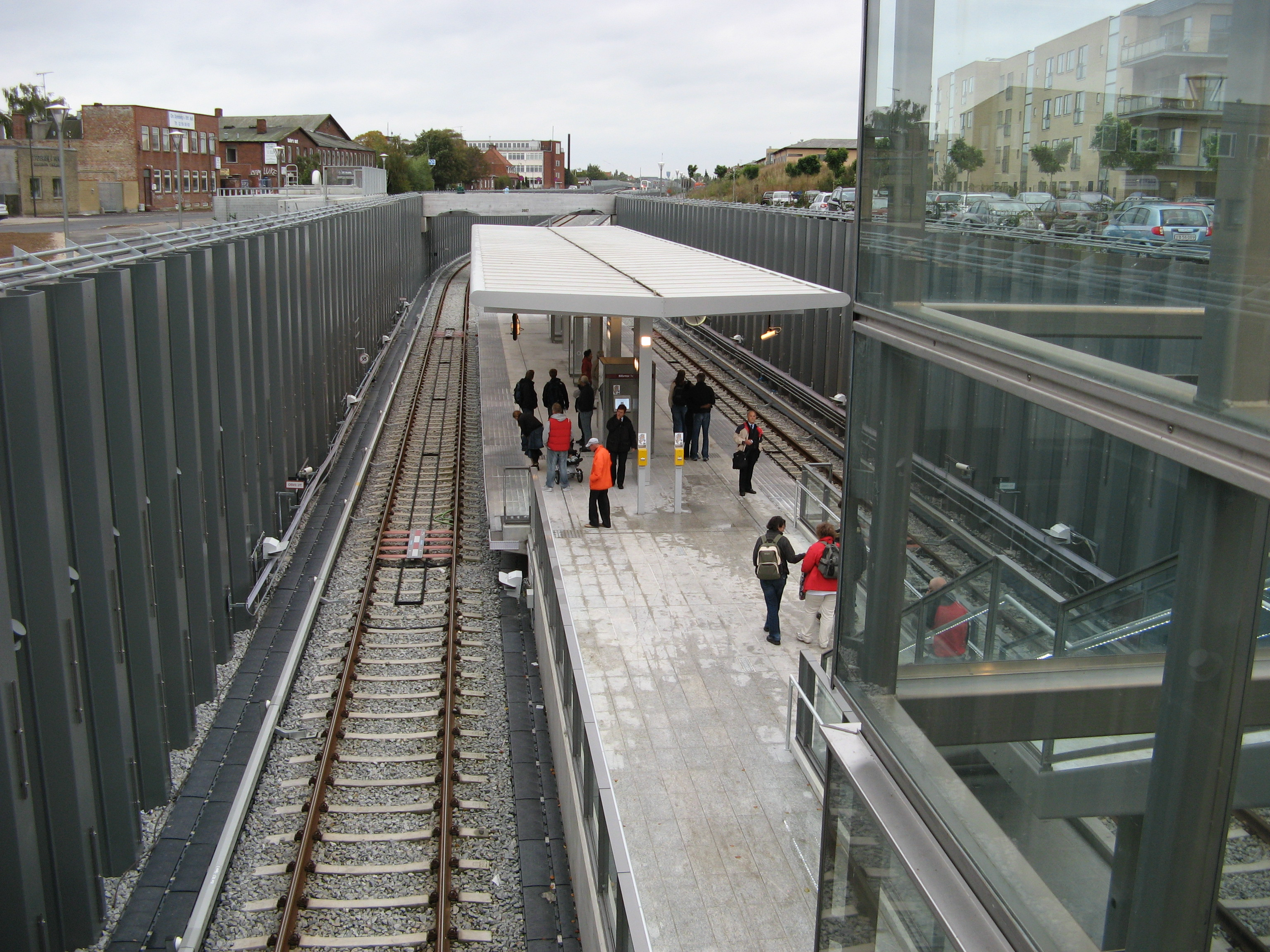
Øresund Station is at-grade.

The system operates 24/7 with a varying headway throughout the day. During rush hour (07:00–10:00 and 15:00–18:00), there is a two-minute headway on the common section and a four-minute headway on the single-service sections. During Thursday through Saturday night (01:00–07:00) on the M1 and M2 lines there is a seven/eight-minute headway on the common section and a fifteen-minute headway on the single-service sections, and other nights it is twenty-minutes on all sections of the metro. At all other times, there is a three-minute headway on the common section and a six-minute on the single-service sections. Travel time from Nørreport to Vestamager on M1 is 14 minutes, to the airport on M2 is 15 minutes, and to Vanløse on M1 and M2 is 9 minutes. During rush hour (07:00–10:00 and 15:00–18:00), on the M3 (Cityringen) there is a three-minute headway. During Thursday through Saturday night (01:00–07:00) on M3 there is an eight-minute headway (one direction), while in the weekdays it is twenty-minutes (two directions). At all other times, there is a four/five-minute headway. Travel time of the Cityringen M3 is 29 minutes. During Thursday through Saturday night (01:00–07:00) on the M4 there is a twenty minute headway. At all other times, there is a two/six/ten-minute headway. Travel time of the M4 is 20 minutes. In 2009, the metro transported 50 million passengers, or 137,000 per day; by 2013, the metro's ridership increased to 55 million.

The metro operates with a proof-of-payment system, so riders must have a valid ticket before entering the station platforms. The system is divided into zones, and the fare structure is integrated with other public transport in Copenhagen, including the buses managed by Movia, local DSB trains and the S-train. The system lies within four different zones. Ticket machines are available at all stations, where special tickets for dogs and bicycles can also be purchased. A two-zone ticket costs DKK 24, and a three-zone ticket DKK 36, and tickets are good for 60 minutes. Holders of the Copenhagen Card museum pass ride free of charge, as do up to two children under twelve years of age accompanied by an adult. As of 2012, the metro has fully adapted to the national electronic fare card system Rejsekort. Outside the Central zones, the outer zones are divided into sub-zones and ticketing can be a bit confusing for visitors familiar with how zones work in London or Berlin. Passengers must specify, on their ticket which sub-zone they wish to travel to.

The system is integrated with other public transport in Copenhagen. There is transfer to the S-train at Vanløse, Flintholm and Nørreport, to DSB's local trains at Nørreport, Ørestad and Lufthavnen, and to Copenhagen Airport at Lufthavnen. There are transfers to Movia bus services at all but four stations.

The system is owned by Metroselskabet, who is also responsible for building the City Circle Line. The company is owned by Copenhagen Municipality (50.0%), the Ministry of Transport (41.7%) and Frederiksberg Municipality (8.3%). Construction and operation is subcontracted through public tenders, while consultants are used for planning. The contract to operate the system was made with Ansaldo STS, who has subcontracted it to Metro Service, a joint venture between them and Azienda Trasporti Milanesi (ATM), the public transport company of the city of Milan, Italy. The company has 285 employees, the majority of whom work as stewards.

In August 2026, KBH Metro Partner will commence operating a 12 year contract in September 2027 taking over from Metro Service.

== Stations ==
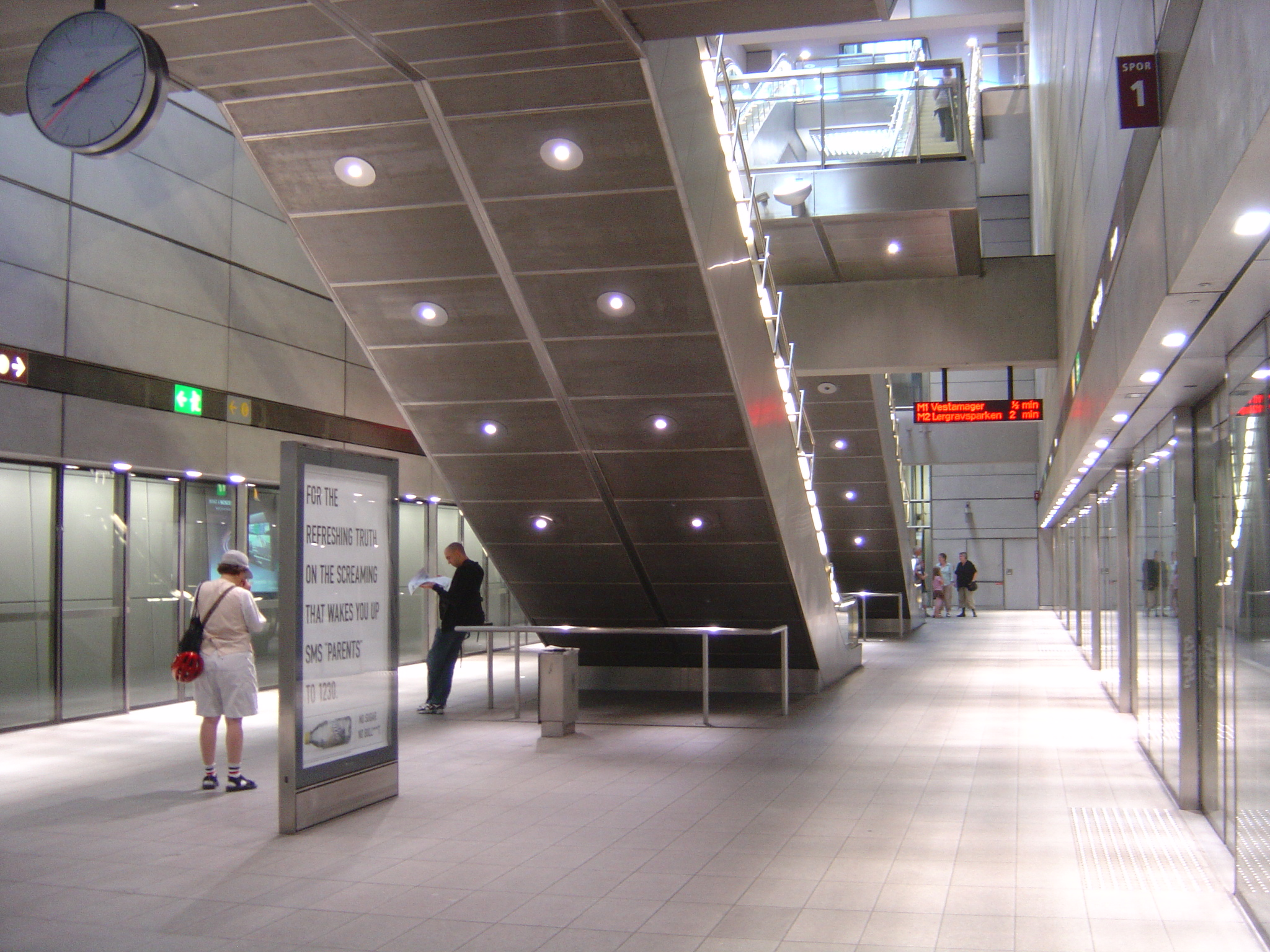
Deep-level station design at Forum

There are 37 stations on the network. Of the initial 22 stations on lines M1 and M2, nine are underground and six of these are deep-level. They were all designed by KHR Arkitekter, who created open stations with daylight. Stations have an information column in front, marked with a large 'M' and featuring information screens. All stations have a vestibule at below ground level, which has ticket and local information, ticket machines and validators. The stations are built with island platforms and are fully accessible for people with disabilities.

The deep-level stations are built as rectangular, open boxes 60 metres (197 ft) long, 20 metres (66 ft) wide and 20 metres (66 ft) deep. The platforms are located 18 metres (59 ft) below the surface. Access to the surface is reached via escalators and elevators. The design allows the stations to be located below streets and squares, allowing the stations to be built without expropriation. The underground stations on M1 and M2 were built as cut-and-cover from the top down (except Christianshavn, which was excavated as a large hole and the station built bottom-up), and the first part of construction was building a water-tight wall on all sides. There are glass pyramids on the roof of the stations permitting daylight to enter. Inside the pyramids, there are prisms reflecting and splitting the light, sometimes resulting in rainbows on the walls. The light in the stations is automatically regulated to make best use of the daylight and maintain a constant level of illumination of the stations at all times.

The elevated stations are built in glass, concrete and steel to minimize their visual impact. Outside, there is parking for bicycles, cars, buses and taxis. Access to the track is blocked by platform screen doors.

== Trains ==
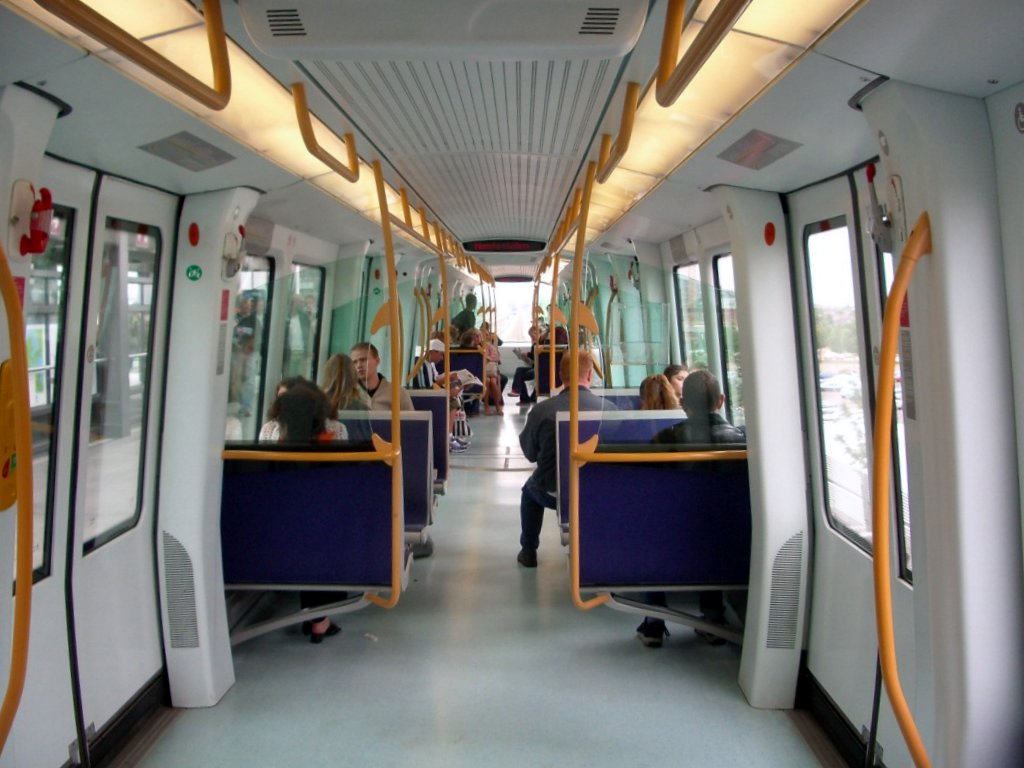
The interior of a Metro train

The system uses 64 driverless electric multiple units built by Hitachi Rail Italy and designed by Giugiaro Design of Italy called the Hitachi Rail Italy Driverless Metro.

The trains are 39 m (127 ft 11 3/8 in) long, 2.65 m (8 ft 8 3/8 in) wide, and weigh 52 t (51 long tons; 57 short tons). Each train consists of three articulated cars with a total of six automated, 1.6 m (5 ft 3 in) wide doors, holding up to 96 seated and 204 standing passengers (300 in total). There are four large 'flex areas' in each train with folding seats providing space for wheelchairs, strollers and bicycles.

Each car is equipped with two three-phase asynchronous 105 kW (141 hp) motors, giving each train a power output of 630 kW (840 hp). In each car, the two motors are fed by the car's own IGBT motor drive. They transform the 750-volt direct current collected from the third rail shoe to the three-phase alternating current used in the motors. The trains' top speed are 80 km/h (50 mph), while the average service speed is 40 km/h (25 mph), with an acceleration and deceleration capacity of 1.3 m/s/s (2.9 mph/s) along the standard-gauge track.

== Operations ==
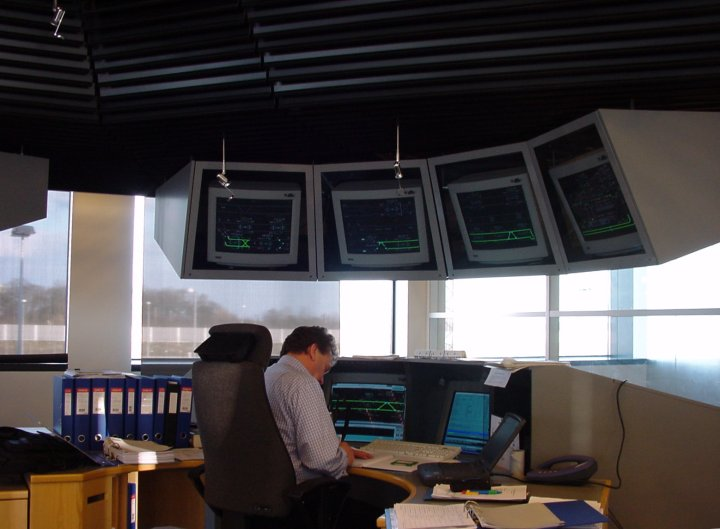
The control room

The entire metro system and the trains are run by a fully automated computer system, located at the two Control and Maintenance Centers, south of Vestamager Station (M1 + M2), and at Sydhavnen (M3 + M4). The automatic train control (ATC) consists of three subsystems: automatic train protection (ATP), automatic train operation (ATO) and automatic train supervisory (ATS). The ATP is responsible for keeping the trains' speed, ensuring that doors are closed before departure and switches are correctly set. The system uses fixed block signaling, except around stations, where moving block signaling is used.

The ATO is the autopilot that runs the trains on a predefined schedule, ensures that the trains stop at the station and open the doors. The ATS keeps track of all the components in the network, including the rails and all of the trains in the system, and displays a live schematic at the control center. The ATC is designed so that the ATP is the only safety-critical system, as it would halt the trains if the other systems fail. The safety and signaling specifications are based on the German BOStrab, and controlled by TÜV Rheinland and Det Norske Veritas under supervision of the Public Transport Authority. Other aspects of the system, such as power supply, ventilation, security alarms, cameras and pumps, are controlled by a system called "control, regulating and surveillance".

=== Vestamager CMC ===
The Control and Maintenance Center is a 1.1-hectare (2.7-acre) facility located at the south end of M1. It consists of a storage area for trains not in use, a maintenance area and the control facility. Trains operate automatically through the system, and can also automatically be washed on the exterior. The facility has 5 km (3.1 mi) of track, of which 800 m (870 yd) is a test track for use after maintenance. The most common repairs are wheel grinding; more complicated repairs are made by replacing entire components that are sent to the manufacturer. By having components in reserve, trains can have shorter maintenance time. The depot also has several maintenance trains, including diesel locomotives that are able to retrieve broken down or disabled trains.

At any time, there are four or five people working at the control center: two monitor the ATC system, one monitors passenger information, and one is responsible for secondary systems, such as power supply. In case of technical problems, there is always a team of linepeople that can be dispatched to perform repairs. Although the trains are not equipped with drivers, there are stewards at stations and on most trains that help passengers, perform ticket controls and assist in emergency situations.

== Sources ==
- Jensen, Tommy O. (2002). "Bag om metroen" [Behind the metro] (PDF). Jernbanen (in Danish) (5): 32–41. Archived from the original (PDF) on 19 July 2011.
- "Passagertal – Metroen" [Number of passengers] (in Danish). Metroselskabet. Archived from the original on 15 November 2022.
