= Frederiks Brygge =

Waterfront area in Copenhagen, Denmark

Coordinates: 55.655°N 12.548°E

Frederiks Brygge (literally: Frederik's Quay") is a waterfront area in the Southern Docklands of Copenhagen, Denmark. It is located at the bottom of Frederiksholmsløbet, a canal that separates Enghave Brygge to the north from Teglholmen to the south.

== History ==
The site was from the 1920s home to the headquarters and main storage of Lemvigh-Müller, a steel wholesaler. Nordea acquired the site in 2006 and Lemvigh-Müller moved to new headquarters in Herlev in 2010. Their old administration building was converted into youth housing in 2013.

== Redevelopment ==
Nordea Liv & Pension (75 %) and PenSam (25 5) will be redeveloping the 80,000-square-metre (860,000 sq ft) site. The masterplan for the area is designed by Design Group Architects. The plans comprise 1,200 apartments, retail and commercial space, 120,000 square metres in total, as well as several new urban spaces.

A 330 m-long (1,080 ft) and five-to-10-storey-tall block will shield the waterfront area from busy Vasbygade. The block will surround five individual courtyards and contain 613 rental apartments. The building will be completed in 2019. The sculptural Belvedere Bridge, made like Japanese origami from red steel plates, deserves attention. A colorful poetic element in a gray and rugged landscape, the bicycle and pedestrian bridge connects the peninsulas of Slüssholmen and Teglholmen, inviting users to shorten the route across the canal and make it easier to get to the city center. Belvederebrun's striking red echoes the rusted steel and brick of HC Ørstedsværket, the architectural landmark of Enghave Brygge.

== Historic buildings ==
One of Lemvigh-Müller & Munch's former warehouses, a The Neoclassical building dating from 1925 is located at Støbegodsvej 1. Since 1995, Ello-Goods has operated an Italian supermarket in the building under the name Supermarco.

== Transport ==
Frederiks Brygge is well-connected to Copenhagen's metro system. Several bus lines serve the area, providing convenient connections to different neighbourhoods and attractions in Copenhagen.
