= Slusen, Copenhagen =

Sluice in Copenhagen, Denmark

Coordinates: 55.6427°N 12.5524°E

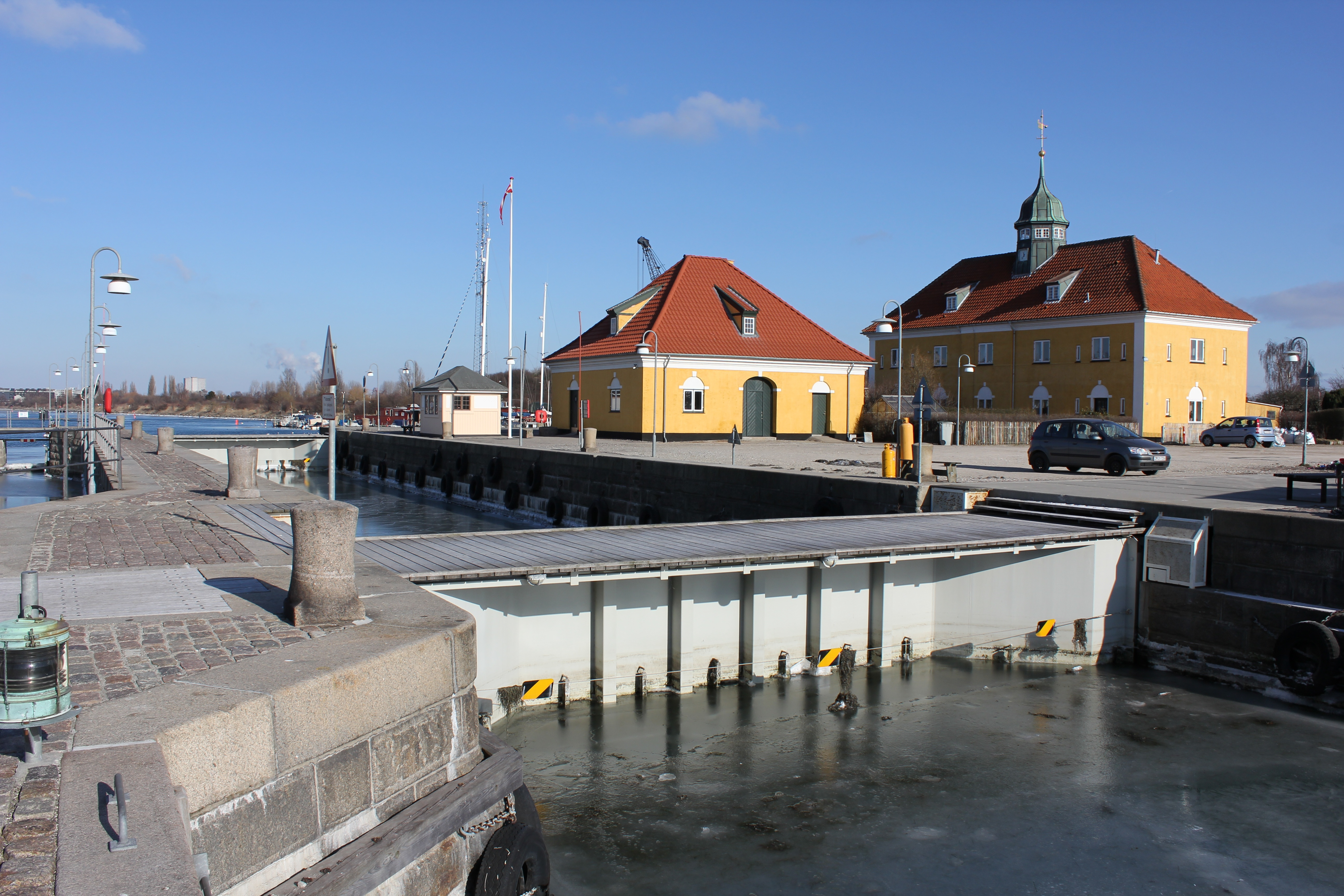
Slusen in the South Harbour of Copenhagen

Slusen (literally "The Sluice") is a lock in the South Harbour of Copenhagen, Denmark. It regulates water levels and inhibits unfavourable currents in the Copenhagen Harbour, occupying both sides of the narrow strait between Zealand and Amager. It lends its name to the adjacent Sluseholmen neighbourhood.

== History ==
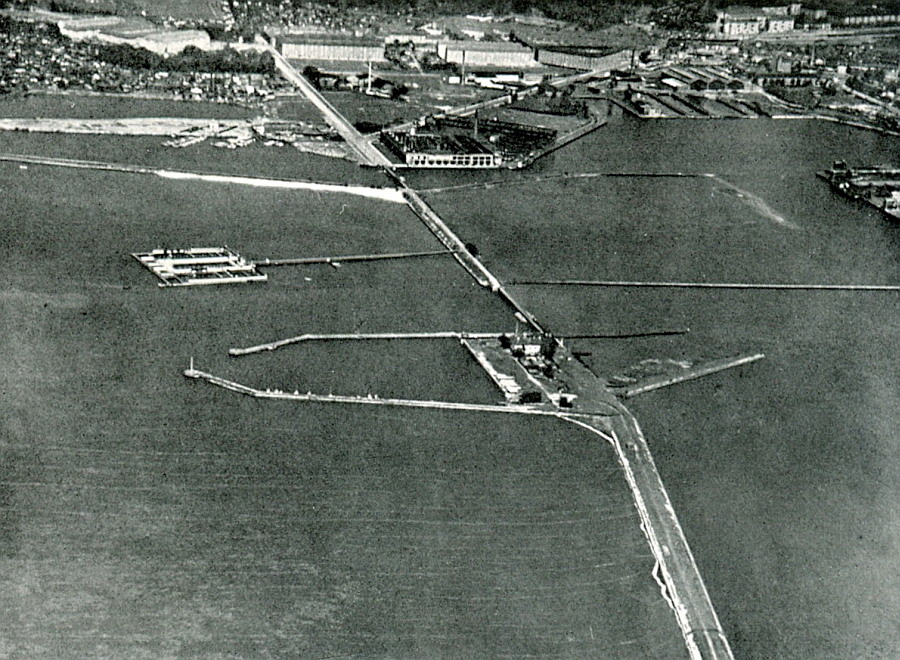
Aerial of Slusen, c. 1930

The Slusen lock system was established between 1901 and 1903 as a consequence of the comprehensive changes which had taken part in Copenhagen Harbour over the past decades. Large-scale expansions of the harbor had dug away enormous amounts of material which had in turn been used for reclamations elsewhere. Especially the ones in the southern part of the harbor, Islands Brygge and the areas now known as Sluseholmen and Teglholmen on the Zealand side, had led to strong currents of up to 6 knots. Due to the relatively weak engines of ships at that time, it made navigation difficult.

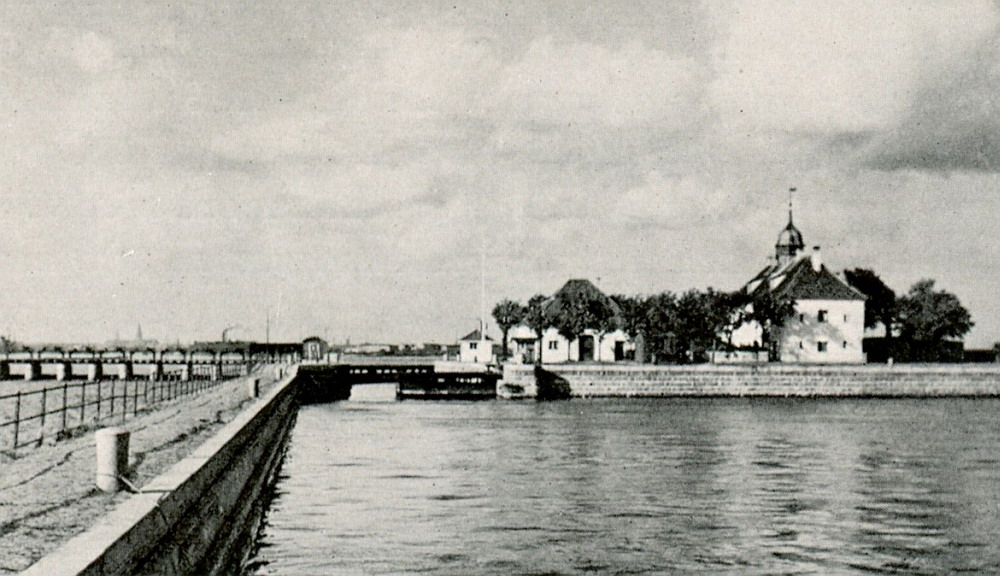
Slusen in about 1930

The lock was used by fishing vessels, dredgers and smaller freight ships right up until the 1970s. The Sjællandsbroen bridge was built to the south of the lock in 1969. It was designed by Niels Rohwder. It originally opened to passing vessels. It is now permanently closed and with a clearance of just three metres, only smaller boats can now enter and exit Copenhagen Harbour from the

== The site ==
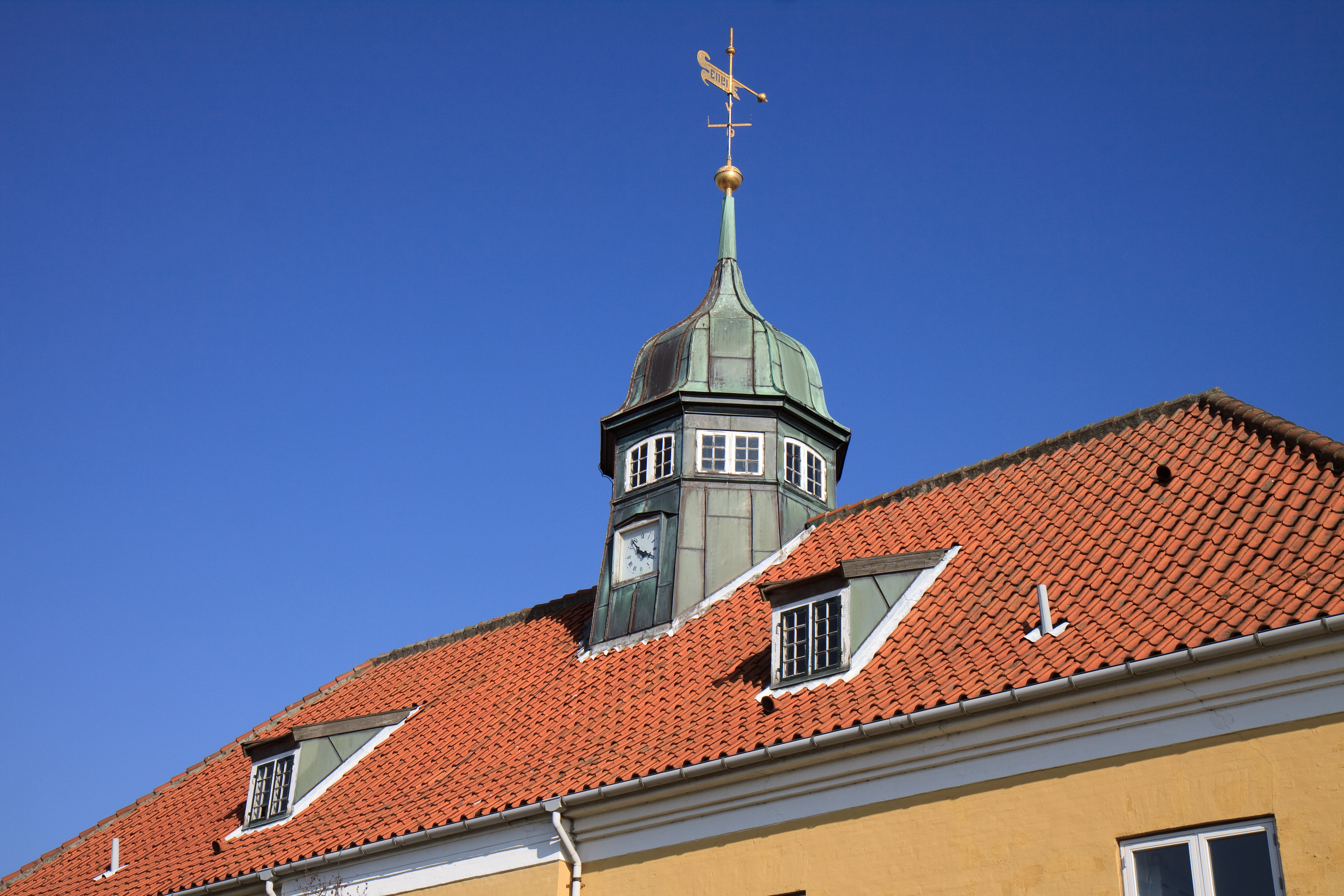
The roof of the main building

The lock consists of an embankment in granite with associated system. It extended for almost two km from Frederiksholm (now Kongens Enghave) to Amager. A house of the lock keeper and another building for the engine which powered the machinery was built on a small artificial island which was established halfway along the embankment. The buildings were designed by Vilhelm Dahlerup who served as architect for Port of Copenhagen. On the south side of the embankment, a small harbor was established where ships could berth while they awaiting passage.

Over the years the shallow waters along entire eastern section of the embankment have been filled, meaning that the island with the buildings now appears as an integrated part of Amager.

== Today ==
The lock closed in 1995 but reopened after a renovation in 2004.

== Houseboat colony ==
The Slusehavnen harbor at Sjællandsbroen is now home to a sizeable houseboat colony, "Husbådskolonien København". The association was founded in 1987 as "Kajforeningen Kalvebod Brygge" ("Quay Association Kalvebod Brygge") since most of the boats at that time was berthed in Tømmergraven at Kalvebod Brygge. They had to move when the shopping mall Fisketorvet was built and the Havneholmen development was planned.
