= Sluseholmen =

Artificial peninsula in Copenhagen, Denmark

Coordinates: 55°38′44″N 12°32′53″E

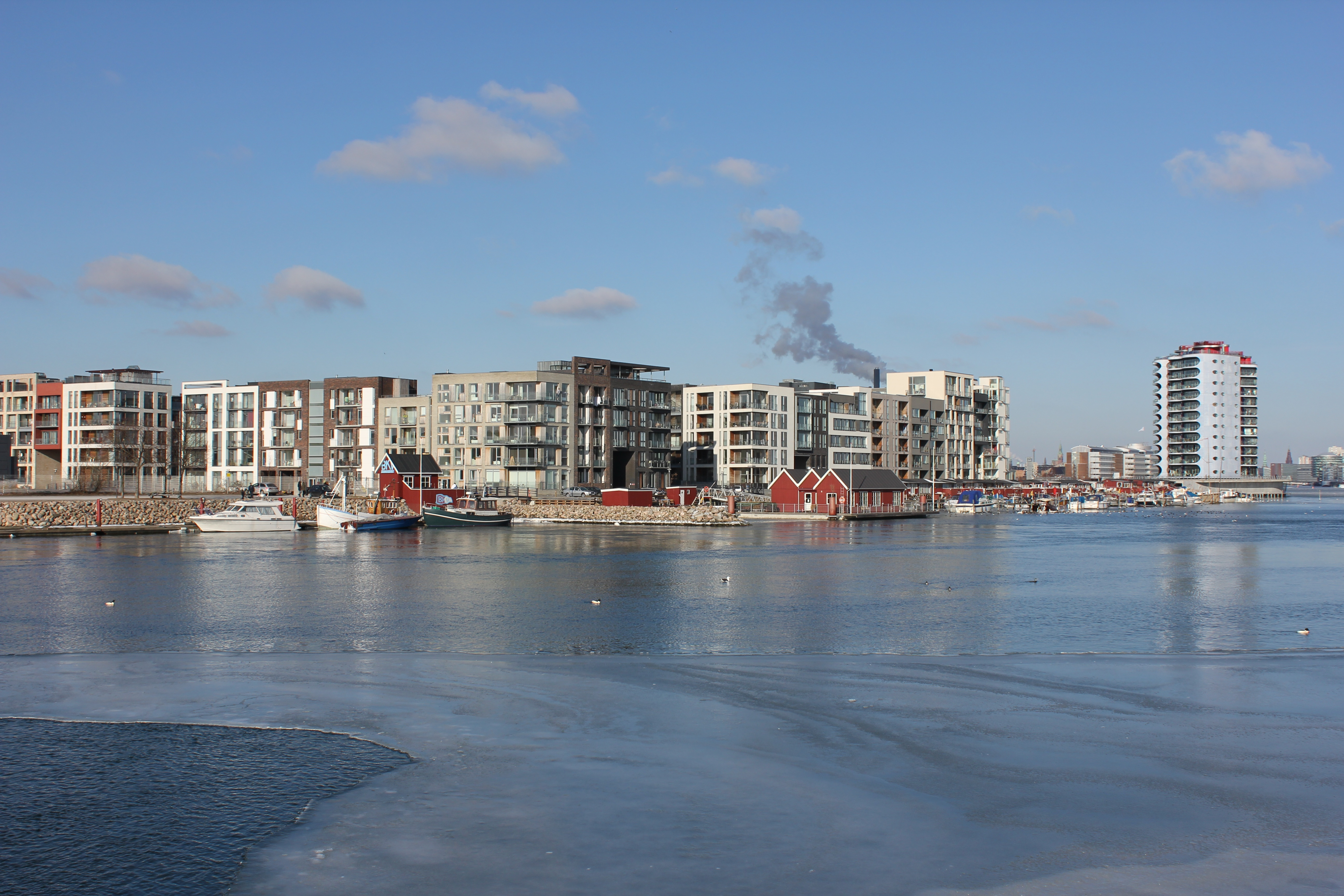
Sluseholmen with the boat club and the Metropolis building to the right

Sluseholmen (lit. 'The Sluice Isle') is an artificial peninsula in the South Harbour of Copenhagen, Denmark. It takes its name from Slusen, a lock immediately to the south, regulating water levels in the harbor. Previously the site of heavy industry and part of the Southern Docklands of Port of Copenhagen, Sluseholmen has, since the turn of the millennium, undergone massive redevelopment, transforming it into a mainly residential district known for its canals and maritime atmosphere. It is connected to Teglholmen by the Teglværk Bridge.

== History ==
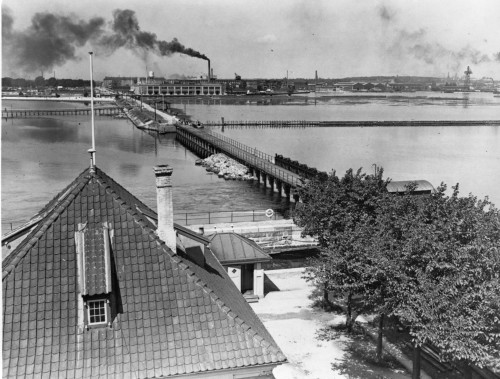
Sluseholmen viewed from the Lock House in the 1930s

Sluseholmen used to be dominated by heavy industry, including a Ford car factory. As industry left the area, a plan was conceived to develop Sluseholmen into a canal district. This was the result of co-operation between the Dutch architect Sjoerd Soeters, Arkitema, the Port of Copenhagen and the City of Copenhagen. Construction started in 2004, the first residents arrived in 2007, and by 2008 development of the new canal district had been completed.

== Sluseholmen today ==
=== Canal District ===
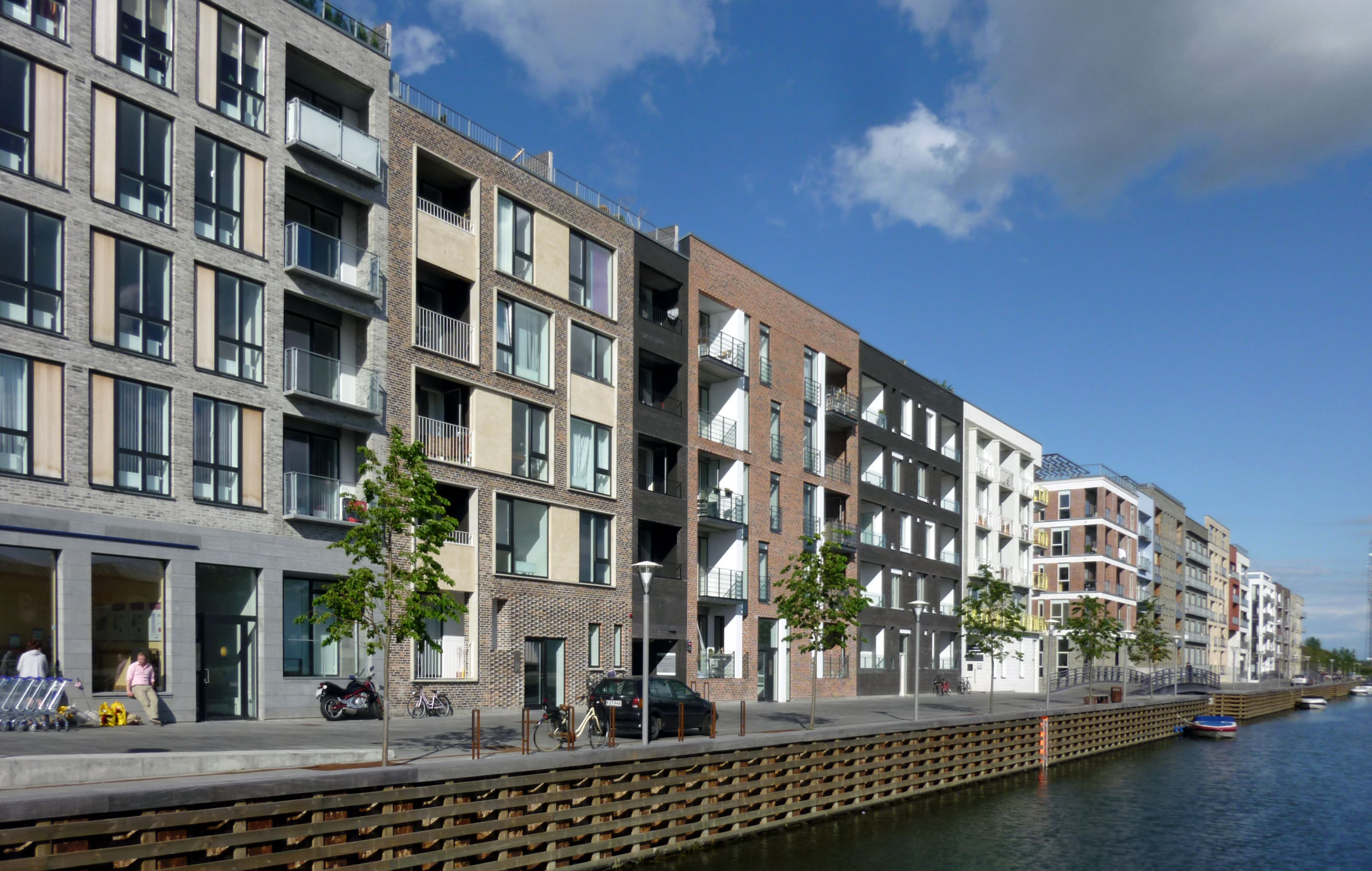
Varied facades of the Canal District

Sluseholmen today is dominated by the Sluseholmen Canal District development of 1,150 apartments, located on artificial islands and separated by dug-out canals.

=== Metropolis ===
Next to the canal district at the end of a pier extending from the tip of the peninsula, stands the Metropolis, a residential high-rise development designed by the experimental British architectural firm Future Systems. Its design has been inspired by the control tower on Langebro.

=== Valby Boat Club ===
Along the eastern waterfront of the canal district lies a row of old, brightly painted wooden sheds, belonging to Valby Boat Club. When the canal district was planned, the initial intention was to relocate the boat club and demolish the sheds. Ultimately it was decided to spare the boat club and its premises to preserve the maritime atmosphere, create an appealing juxtaposition of old and new, and strengthen the sense of place. The boat club also has a restaurant open to the public.

=== Harbour Bath ===
In late 2011, the third Copenhagen Harbour Bath opened at Sluseholmen. It was designed by Kasper Danielsen Arkitekter.

=== Others ===
The Teglværksbroen Bridge connecting Sluseholmen to Teglholmen opened in January 2011. The bridge was designed by the Danish architectural firm Hvidt & Mølgaard.

== Transport ==
Sluseholmen station on the M4 line was opened in the area in June 2024.

Sluseholmen had a reputation for poor public transport serving the area. This was due to the long delay in building a bridge to Teglholmen, originally planned to open in 2007. After the inauguration of Teglværksbroen Bridge in January 2011, bus line 30 (which previously by-passed the area) was diverted to Sluseholmen, connecting the neighborhood to the Copenhagen Metro (Bella Center Station - 5 minute ride) and Copenhagen Central Station - Vesterport S-train Station, a 10-15 minute ride depending on traffic. Nowadays, the 7A line passes through Sluseholmen, and over the bridge to Teglholmen and towards the city center.

Since September 2009, Sluseholmen has been served by Route 901/902 of the Copenhagen Harbour Buses.

== Cultural references ==
A vehicle explodes at Sluseholmen's North Quay (Nordre Sluseholmskai) at 0:59:45 in the 1977 Olsen-banden film The Olsen Gang Outta Sight.
