= Movia =

Movia may refer to:

- Alstom Movia, a family of metro train cars built by Alstom (initially Bombardier)
- Movia (transit agency), a public transport agency in Copenhagen, Denmark
- Dinornis or Movia, an extinct genus of birds
