= Lemvigh-Müller =

Danish wholesaler

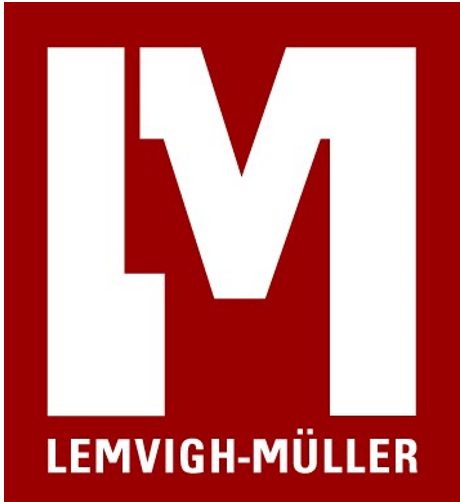
- Company type: Private limited company
- Industry: Engros
- Founded: 1846
- Founder: J. F. Lemvigh-Müller
- Headquarters: Herlev, Danmark
- Key people: CEO Christian Søgaard-Christensen CFO Annette Schmidt CCO Peter Faaborg-Andersen Chairman Christian Lemvigh-Müller
- Revenue: ▲7.980 billion. kr. (2023)
- Net income: ▲123 million. kr. (2023)
- Total assets: ▲2.708 billion. kr. (2023)
- Total equity: ▲1.382 billion. kr. (2023)
- Owner: Lemvigh-Müller Fonden, I.F. Lemvigh-Müllers Fond
- Number of employees: +1,350 (2023)
- Subsidiaries: G.Funder, Elworks

Lemvigh-Müller is the largest wholesaler of steel and technical installations in Denmark, with over 550,000 different products in its range, +1,350 employees, and an annual turnover of 7.980 billion DKK.

The company has its roots in the business founded by Johan Frederik Lemvigh-Müller on his 23rd birthday on 28 November 1846 in Copenhagen.

Lemvigh-Müller initially had steel as its main business area. Since then, plumbing and HVAC (tools, machine tools and engineering) have been added - and after the merger with Louis Poulsen El-teknik on 1 January 2007, they are now also one of Denmark's two major electrical & engineering wholesalers.

The company currently has headquarters in Herlev & Kolding. Goods are shipped from 3 central warehouses in Odense, Kolding and Randers as well as 23 stores nationwide and 4 production/metalworking facilities in Køge, Randers, Skjern and Swinoujscie in Poland.

Two-thirds of Lemvigh-Müller A/S is now owned by the Lemvigh-Müller Foundation, which supports cultural, social and productive causes in the wider community, as well as ensuring the group's viability and efficiency. The remaining third is owned by I.F. Lemvigh-Müller Foundation which provides non-profit support in the fields of cultural, national, humanitarian and social causes.

== History ==
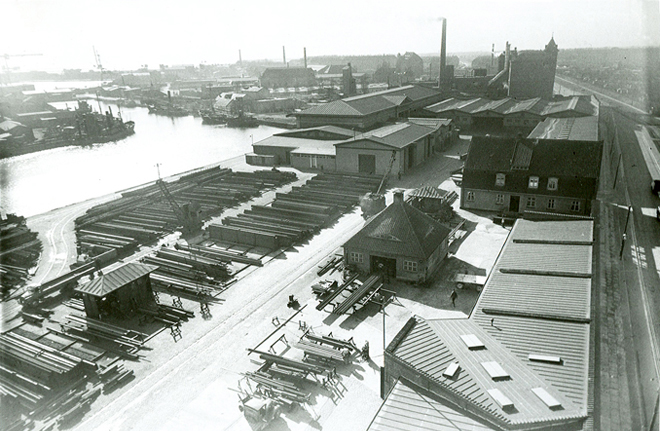
Lemvigh-Müller & Munck - Southern Port

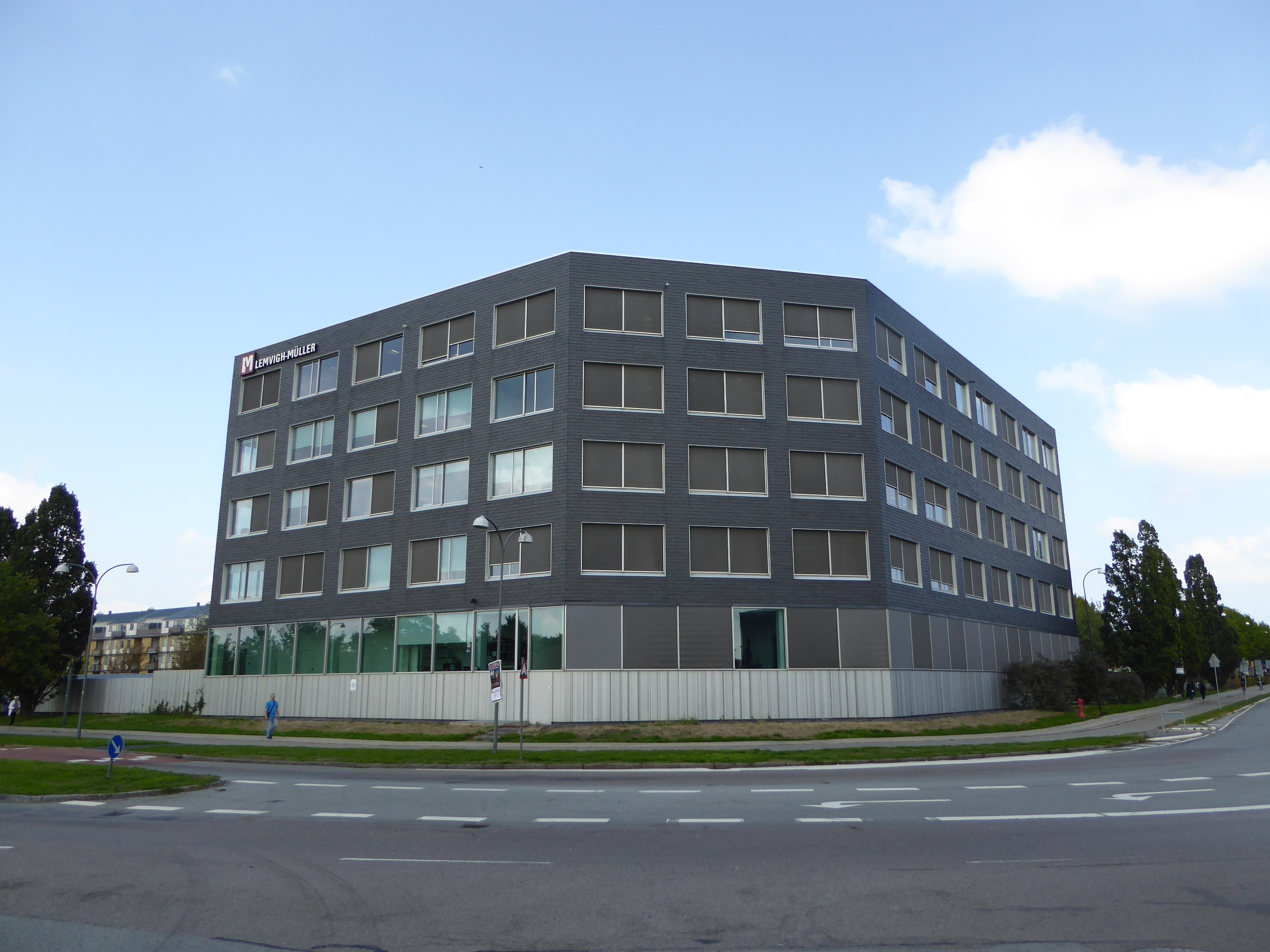
Lemvigh-Müller office in Herlev

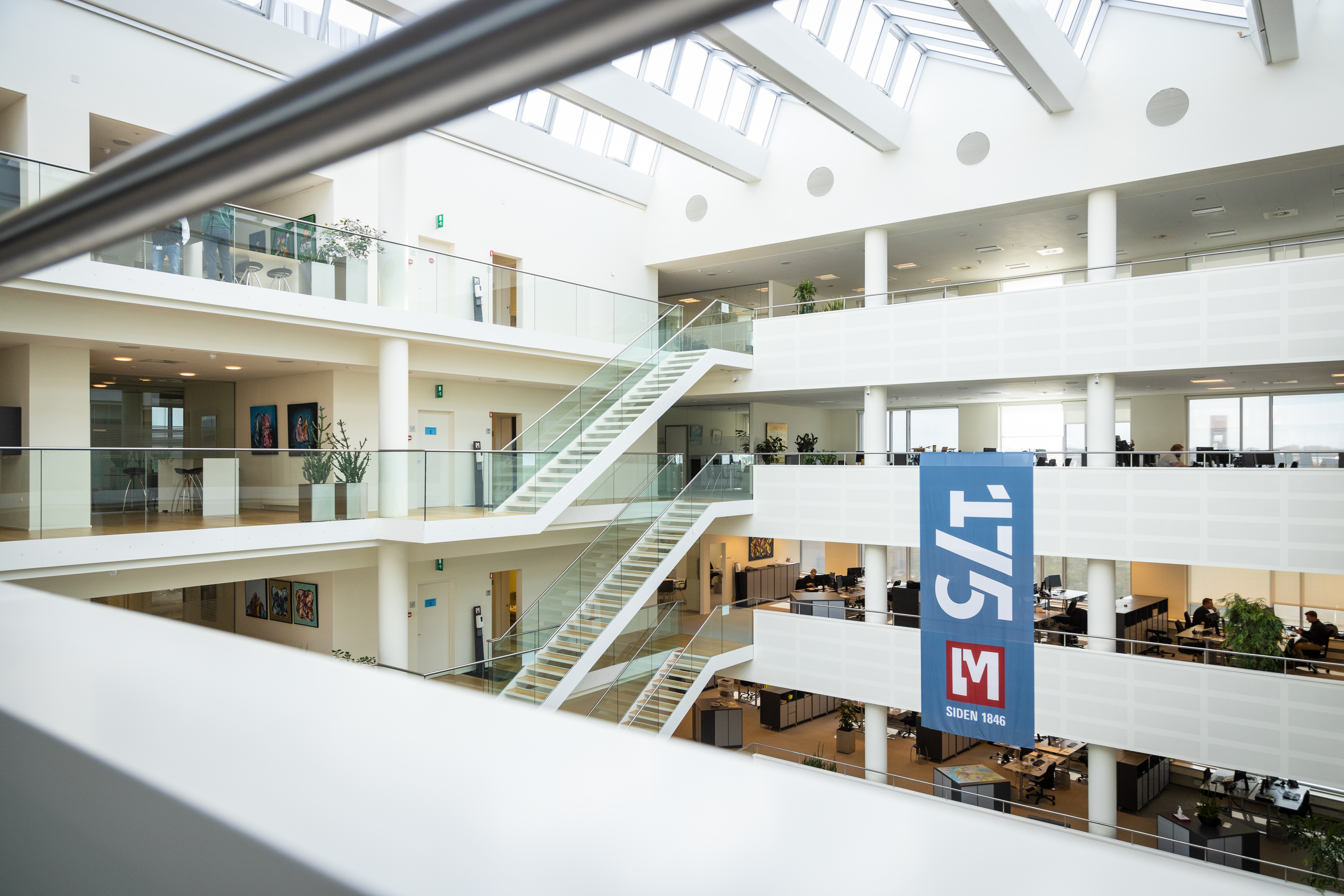
Lemvigh-Müller - 175 years celebration

The company traces its history back to 1846 when J. F. Lemvigh-Müller (1823–1888) established a store at Kultorvet 13 in Copenhagen. The company specialised in supplying steel and raw iron to projects across the country, and the business grew organically and through the acquisition of other merchants.

Johan died in 1888, but the business was carried on by his son Valdemar Lemvigh-Müller (1864-1928), who also expanded steadily by taking over other large merchants. An acquisition worth mentioning was the merger with P.G. Munk A/S from 1920, which had taken over Jørn Jensen's iron business in 1904 and effectively represented a major merger of competitors creating a new power in the steel industry. The business would be named Lemvigh-Müller & Munck A/S and would be housed in Munck's premises at Vestergade 16 - close to Copenhagen's Town Hall Square. Valdemar Lemvigh-Müller served as chairman of the board of the new company until his death in 1928, when Carl Johan Frederik Lemvigh-Müller took over the business.

In 1922, the business expanded into Frederiksholm Dock in the Southern Docklands. Huge warehouses were built here, with bollard space, railway tracks and modern machinery such as steam and electric cranes. The facility was the largest of its kind in the country.

In the 1920s, steel still formed the backbone of the company but there was a need for diversification. This was the case, for example, with the patent for the manufacture of lightweight concrete slabs, which Lemvigh-Müller & Munck A/S acquired in the mid-1930s. In 1939, A/S Dansk Betonklinker was founded, and the first rotary kiln in Sydhavnen began firing the product that was to become success under the name LECA (Light Expanded Clay Aggregates). A/S Dansk Betonklinker was part of Lemvigh-Müller under various names and had a solid position in the Danish market until 2006, when the company was sold off.

Carl Johan Frederik Lemvigh-Müller establishes the Lemvigh-Müller Foundation to mark the company's 100th anniversary. In 1985, the shares were transferred to the Lemvigh-Müller Foundation, which thus took over ownership of the company and remains its main shareholder.

In 1995, Lemvigh-Müller acquires S.C. Sørensen A/S, and finally in 2002, J-F. Lemvigh-Müller Holding A/S merged Lemvigh-Müller & Munch A/S with SC Sørensen A/S under the name LMG Stål A/S. The name LMG Stål disappeared after J.-F. Lemvigh-Müller merged 15 companies under the Lemvigh-Müller name in 2004.

Initially a steel & iron business, the company grew steadily, expanding into more business areas such as plumbing and HVAC (tools, machine tools and engineering).

In April 2005, it was announced that Lemvigh-Müller would build a new headquarters in Herlev. In July 2005, the company acquired Louis Poulsen El-teknik. In November 2005, Lemvig-Mïller sold its site in Copenhagen's South Harbour to Nordea Pension.

In 2017, Lemvigh-Müller acquires G. Funder and Elworks in a bid to strengthen its position in relation to DIY stores and retailers.

== Ownership ==
The Lemvigh-Müller Foundation was established in 1946 to celebrate the company's 100th anniversary. The Foundation owns two thirds of J-F. Lemvigh-Müller Holding A/S, the parent company of Lemvigh-Müller A/S and Lemvigh-Müller Ejendomme ApS. The Foundation supports cultural, social and productive causes in the general public and ensures the group's viability and efficiency. The Foundation aims to make donations where the money has most impact. In practice, this means that the funds end up with financially less well-off causes and people who do not receive public support.

In 2020, the Lemvigh-Müller Foundation donated DKK 16 million to cultural, social and productive causes and to employees of the Group, while the Group's other foundation, I.F. Lemvigh-Müller Foundation, donated DKK 9 million in the same year.

I.F. Lemvigh-Müller Foundation was founded in 1936 and owns the last third of the parent company J-F. Lemvigh-Müller Holding A/S. The purpose of the Foundation is to provide non-profit support in the fields of culture, national development, humanitarian and social causes. In addition to charitable purposes, the Foundation supports the descendants of the Lemvigh-Müller Group's founder, Johan Frederik Lemvigh-Müller. This can be, for example, support for needy older members of the family, support for surviving spouses or educational support for younger members of the family. Finally, the Foundation provides support to employees who are or have been employed by the Group.
