= Teglværksbroen =

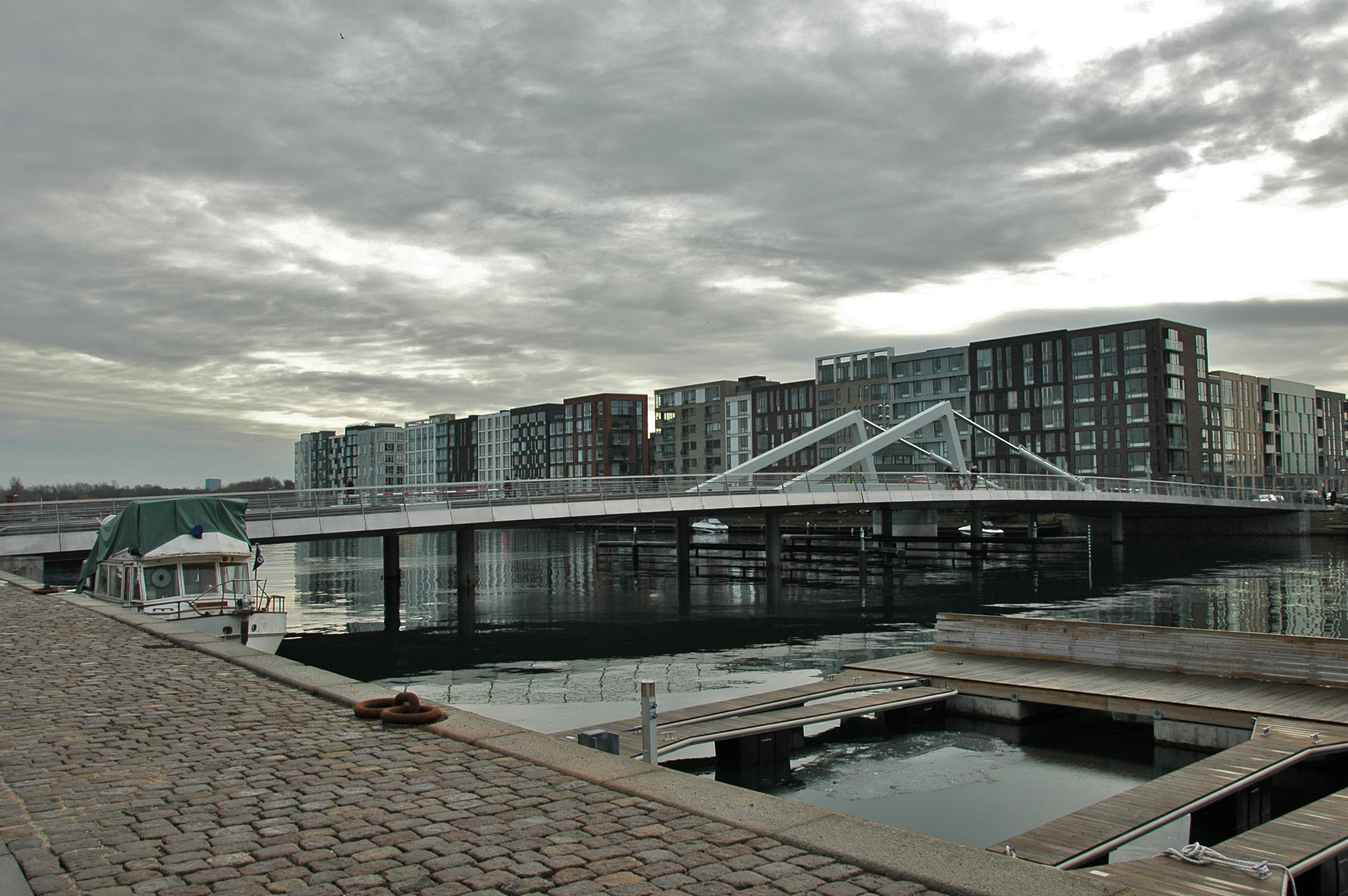
- The bridge seen from Teglholmen
- Coordinates: 55°38′51″N 12°33′1″E
- Carries: Motor vehicles, pedestrian and bicycle traffic
- Crosses: Teglværkshavnen
- Locale: Copenhagen, Denmark

Characteristics
- Design: Bascule Bridge
- Total length: 97 metres (318 ft)
- Width: 20 metres (66 ft)

History
- Designer: Hvidt & Mølgaard
- Engineering design by: ISC A/S
- Opened: 2011

Teglværksbroen is a bascule bridge which connects Sluseholmen to Teglholmen in the South Harbour of Copenhagen, Denmark. It crosses the entrance to the Teglværkshavnen (em. Tileworks Dock) from which it takes its name.

== History ==
The need for the bridge arose when the Sluseholmen and Teglholmen areas came under redevelopment. Its design was the subject of an architectural competition which was won by Hvidt & Mølgaard in 2008. The leaf was manufactured in one 20 by 20 metres piece in Gdańsk, Poland, and installed on the site in January 2011.

== Design ==
The bridge is built to a simple design which heralds that of the older bridges in the Port of Copenhagen. The most distinctive feature of the bridge is two simple and light twin triangles which are illuminated from below at night.
