= CityCirkel =

Bus route in Copenhagen, Denmark

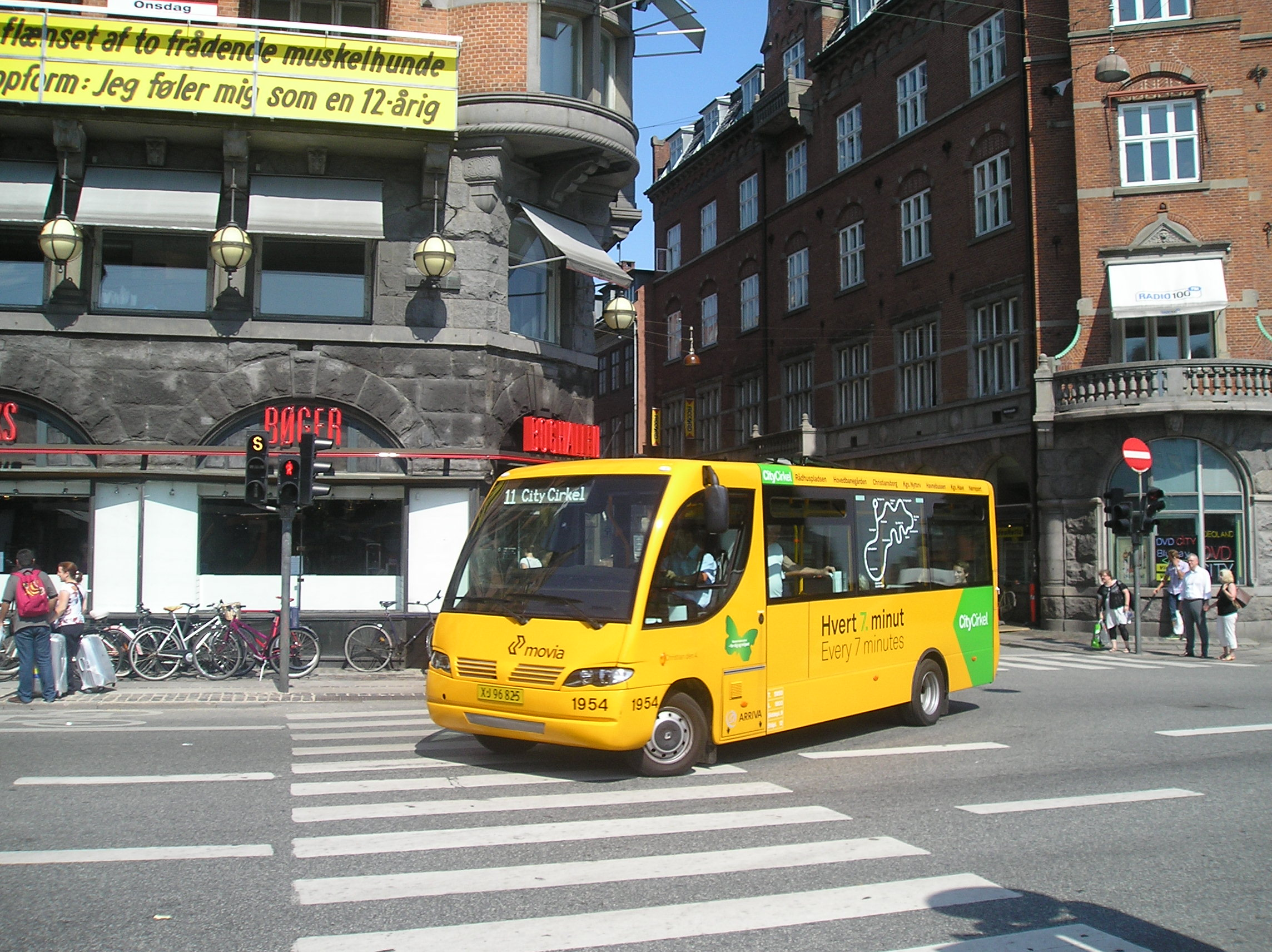
CityCirkel at Rådhuspladsen.

CityCirkel was a one-way circular bus route operated by electrical buses in Copenhagen, Denmark, from June 12, 2009, to October 24, 2010. The line was designated route 11, run by Movia and was part of the public transport infrastructure in the greater Copenhagen. The buses are small, with around seven seats, and battery operated.

The small buses and one-way route was well suited for the narrow and often one-way streets of inner Copenhagen (Indre By). The buses make almost no noise compared to regular buses and are the first of their kind in Denmark.

Due to lack of passengers the route was closed and the buses transferred to the new A-bus line 11A on October 24, 2010.
