= Copenhagen Opera House =

National opera house of Denmark

- Operaen på Holmen
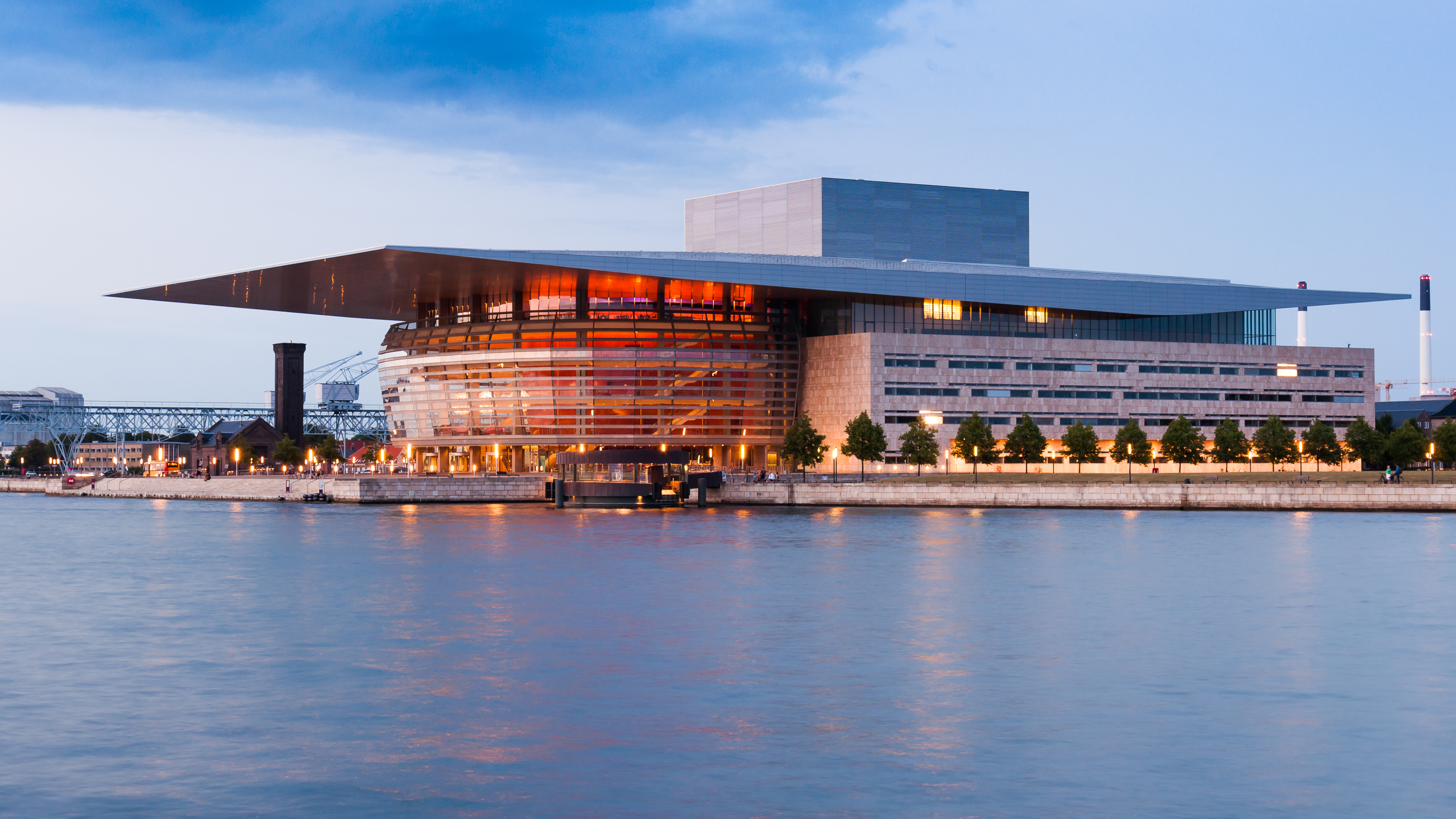

General information
- Type: Opera house
- Architectural style: Neo-futurism
- Location: Ekvipagemestervej 10; 1438 København, Denmark
- Coordinates: 55°40′55″N 12°36′02″E
- Construction started: June 2001
- Completed: 1 October 2004
- Inaugurated: 15 January 2005

Design and construction
- Architect: Henning Larsen

Other information
- Seating capacity: 1,700

The Copenhagen Opera House (in Danish usually called Operaen, literally The opera) is the national opera house of Denmark, and among the most modern opera houses in the world. It is also one of the most expensive opera houses ever built at a cost of 2.5 billion DKK (c. 370,000,000 USD). It is located on the island of Holmen in central Copenhagen.

== History ==
The foundation A.P. Møller og Hustru Chastine Mc-Kinney Møllers Fond til almene Formaal donated the Opera House to the Danish state in August 2000. (Arnold Peter Møller (1876–1965) was a co-founder of the company now known as Mærsk). Some politicians were offended by the private donation, in part because the full cost of the project would be tax deductible, thus virtually forcing the government to buy the building; but the Folketing and the government accepted it in the autumn of 2000.

Architect Henning Larsen (1925–2013) and engineers Ramboll and Buro Happold and theatre consultant Theatreplan designed the facility. The acoustics were designed by Arup Acoustics and Speirs and Major Associates designed the architectural lighting. A.P. Møller had the final say in the design of the building, however, adding steel to the glass front, among other things. Construction began in June 2001 and was completed on 1 October 2004. It opened on 15 January 2005 in the presence of shipping magnate Mærsk Mc-Kinney Møller (1913–2012), Danish Prime Minister Anders Fogh Rasmussen, and Queen Margrethe II. The tenor Plácido Domingo made a gala guest appearance as Sigmund in Wagner's Die Walküre on 7 April 2006 in a production by Kasper Bech Holten and attended by The Queen.

== Location ==
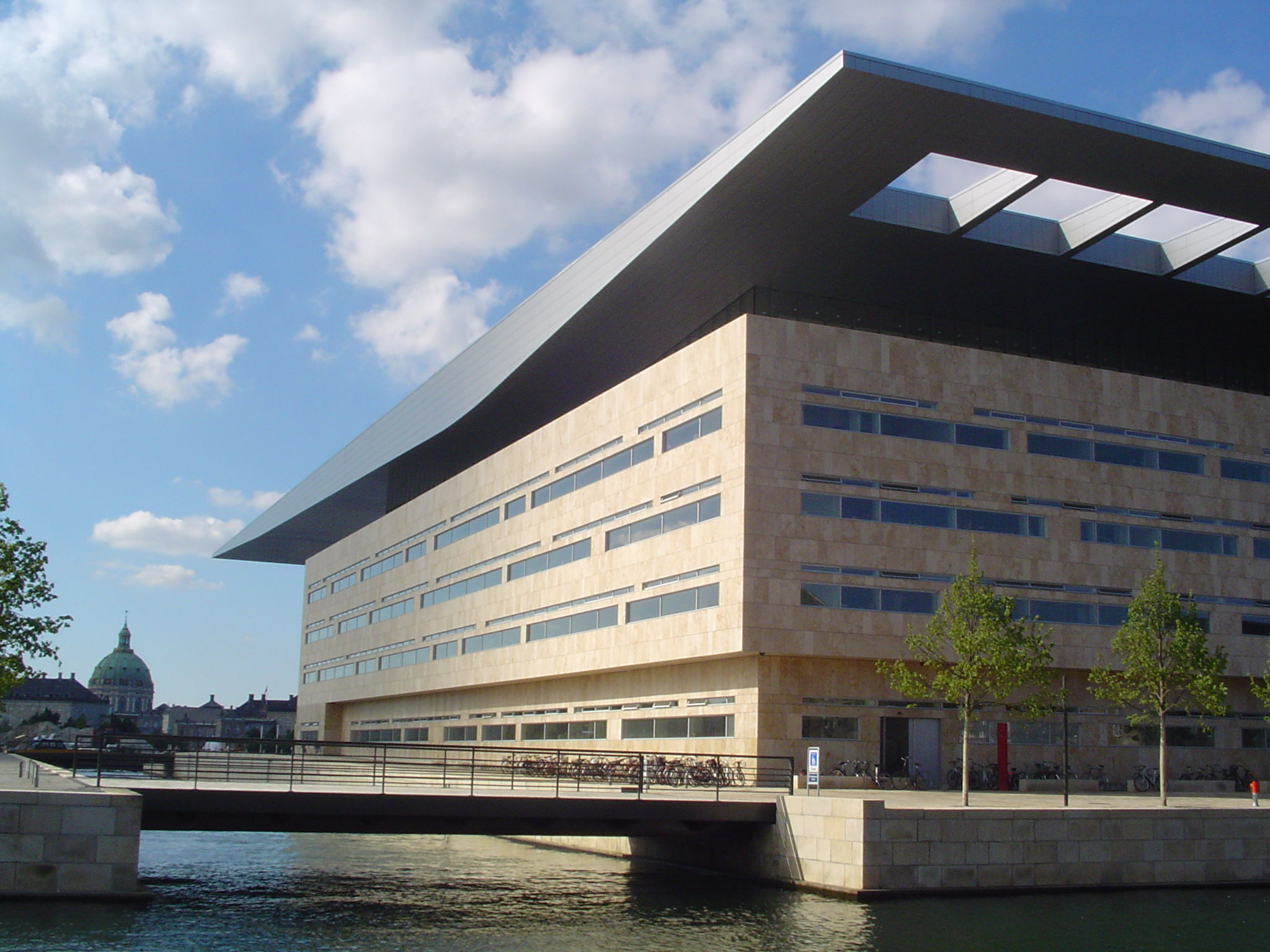
The Opera House looking north. Amalienborg and the dome of The Marble Church are visible in the background.

The Opera is located in central Copenhagen at the shore of the Inner Harbour, and just opposite the main palace Amalienborg, residence of the Danish royal family. The opera house is built in alignment with Amalienborg and Frederik's Church ( Frederiks Kirke), popularly known as the Marble Church (Marmorkirken) so that if one stands in the main entrance of the Opera, one can see the Marble Church over the water along the road through Amalienborg. The specific part of the island where the Opera was built is named Dokøen, which means the Dock Island. Just a few meters west of the opera, one can still see an old dock and a pumping station.

== Characteristics ==
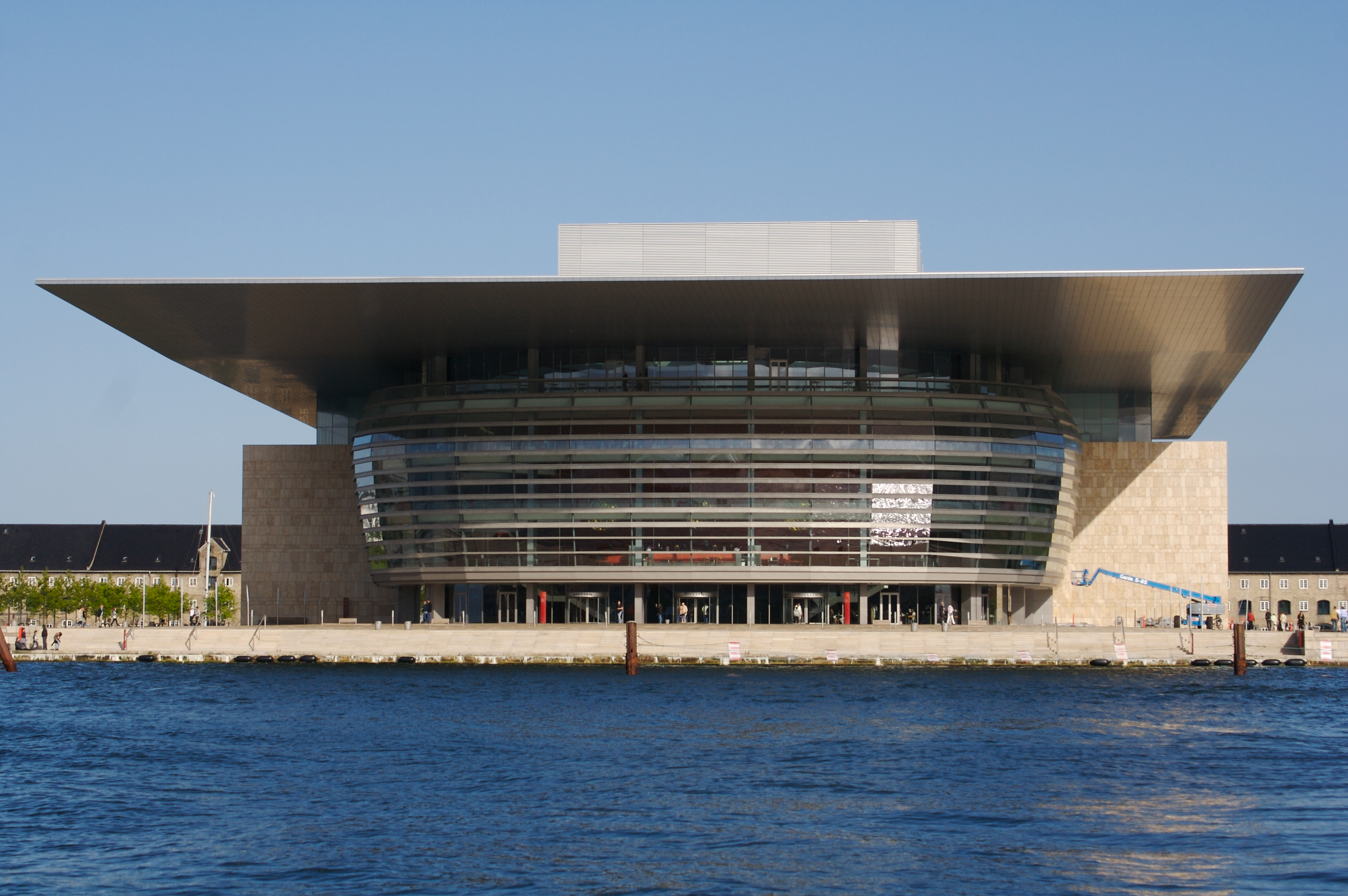
The front façade

The house is administered by the Royal Danish Theatre and is one of the best-equipped in the world. It has a main stage with five other stages directly connected, where large setups can be moved easily in and out. The theatre can seat between 1492 and 1703, depending on the size of the orchestra. The 1492 seats are all individually angled in order to provide the best experience.

The orchestra pit is one of the largest in any opera house, with room for 110 musicians; the structure provides excellent sound quality for the orchestra. If the pit is filled, some musicians are located just below the front of the stage, which has become controversial among some members of the orchestra (according to tour guides in 2005), because this increases the sound levels, beyond those acceptable in Denmark. However, the overhang is very slight and the authorities have permitted this to happen.

During construction of the theatre, some acoustic tests were carried out with the fire curtain in place while technical work was carried out on stage, but great consideration was given to balance between pit and stage. If the orchestra is small or absent, the pit can be covered and additional seats can be added to the auditorium.

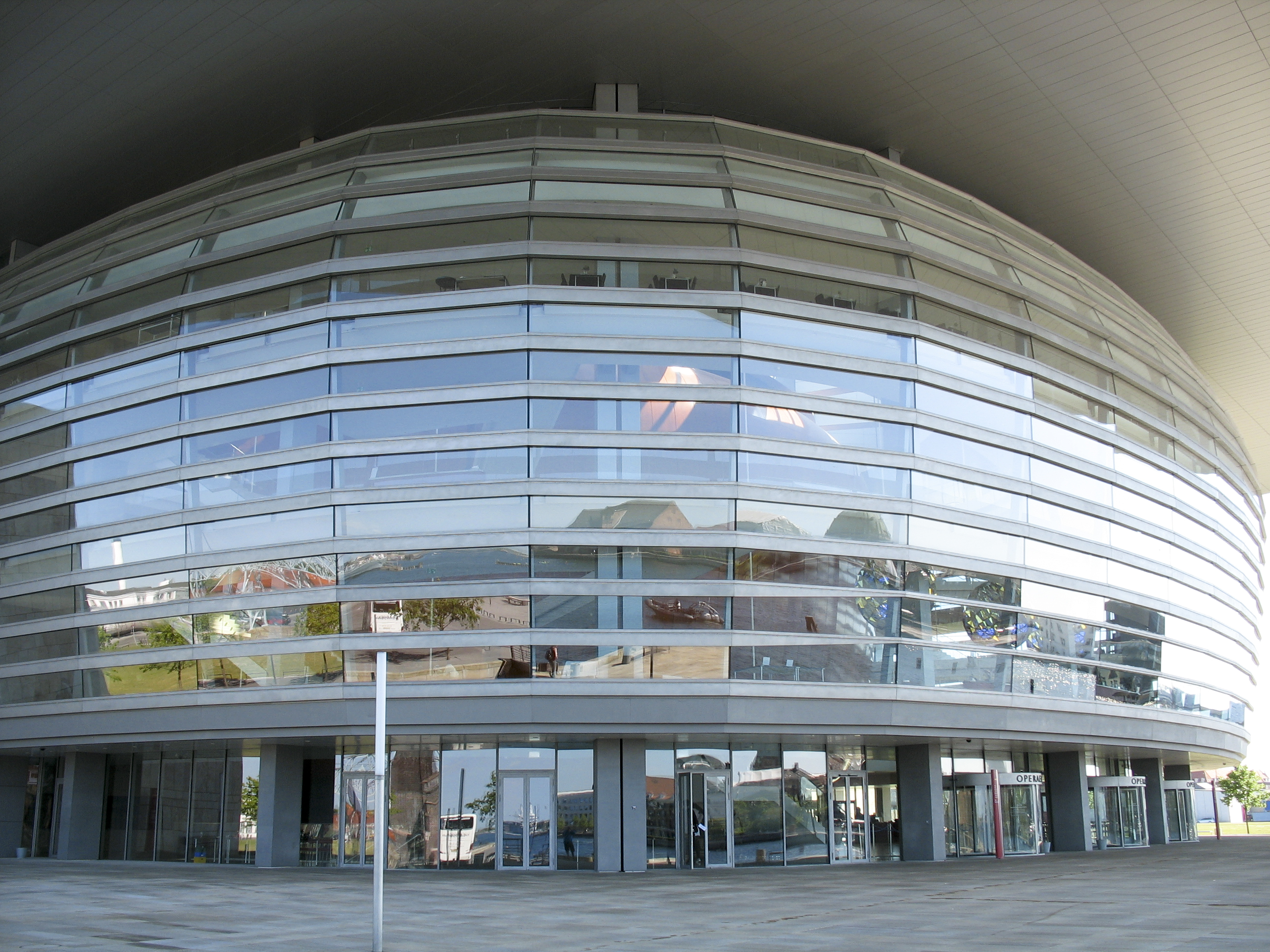
Opera House entrance

Just like the old Royal Danish Theatre in Copenhagen, The Queen has her own box on the left side of the auditorium, closest to the stage. The foyer has been designed for comfort, based on behavioural research on opera goers maximizing the wall area for standing against, while still providing views across the entire foyer and one of the best views on Copenhagen. Guided tours cover most of the building, including both the auditorium and backstage areas.

== Takkelloftet ==
Besides the main stage, the building also includes a small stage for experimental theatre, a so-called "black box" theatre called Takkelloftet. It was named after the original Takkelloftet, a building just south of the Opera 280 meters long and built between 1767 and 1772 for storing ropes for the navy. Thus the opera maintains a connection to the marine history of its location.

Everything on the stage and in the audience area is totally black, and the audience seats can easily be removed in order to make the room much easier to configure for alternative setups. There are up to approximately 200 seats for this stage. Takkelloftet has its own foyer. In this room, some of the walls are decorated using the same Jura Gelb limestone as outdoor. These stones are mounted on the wall in a way that makes it possible to use the stone plates as a kind of music instrument just by knocking on them with bare hands.

== Backstage ==
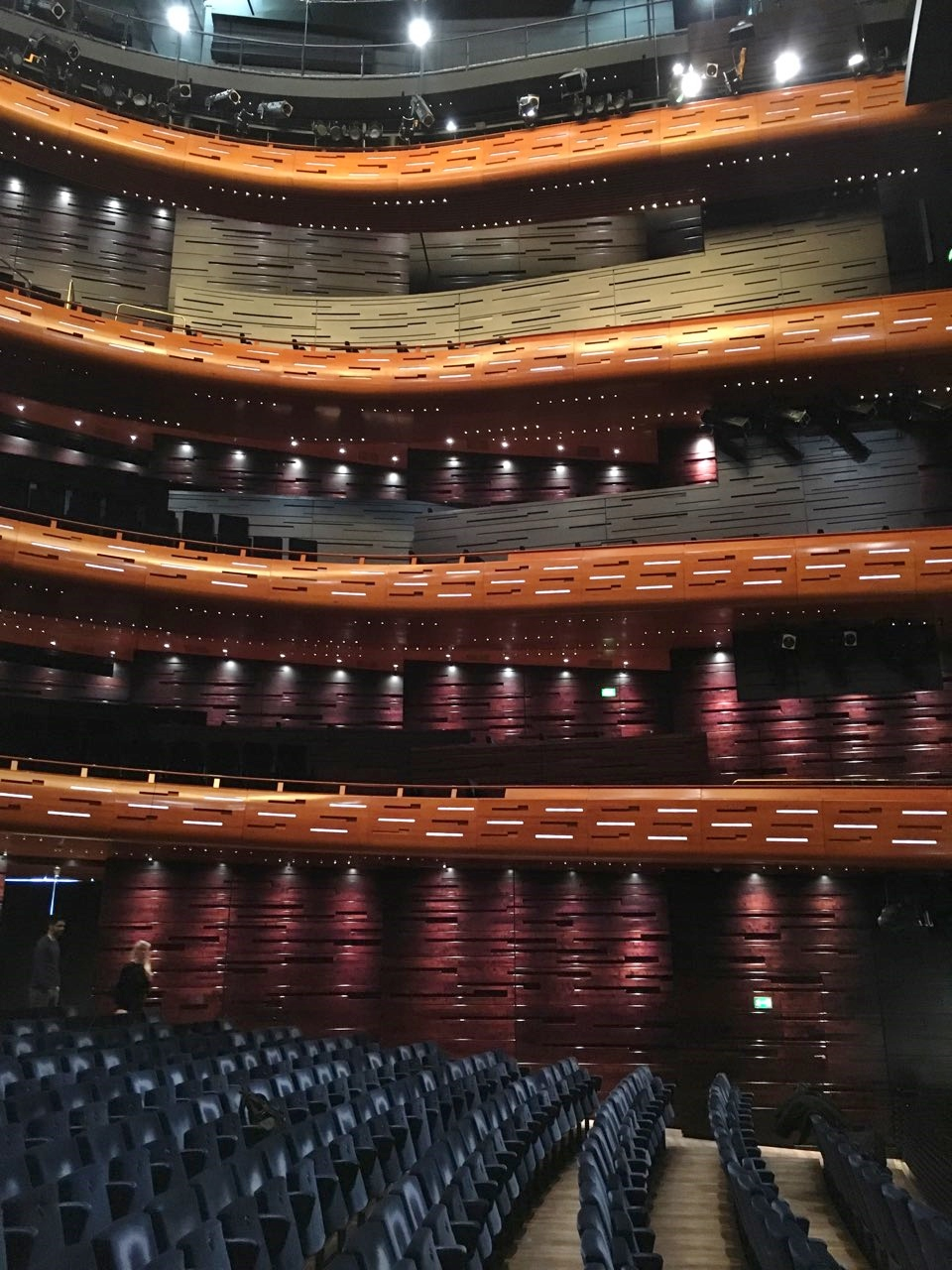
Inside of Operaen

The Opera has 6 main stages: 1 visible for the audience, and 5 for rehearsals and set preparation. It has almost everything needed for opera, ballet etc., including stage elevators, movable ballet floors, etc. The building totals 41,000 m^{2} and has 14 floors, of which 5 are below ground. It contains more than 1000 rooms, including a large orchestral rehearsal room. Despite its luxurious equipment, there are only approximately 1500 seats because a larger number of seats would hamper the quality of sound.

Unlike the old opera in Copenhagen, the artists are allowed to take the elevator from their dressing room to the stage, because of their reliability. However, the 81 dressing rooms are farther from the stage, making it almost impossible to return for quick costume changes. Designers did not account for this, but stagehands have solved this problem by constructing temporary dressing rooms near the main stage for quick changes of clothes or makeup.

The building makes it possible to go outside on the top floor, but it is only possible to walk comfortably at the south side of the building (opposite to the entrance). The employee canteen is located in this area, isolated from public view.

== Architecture, art and decoration ==
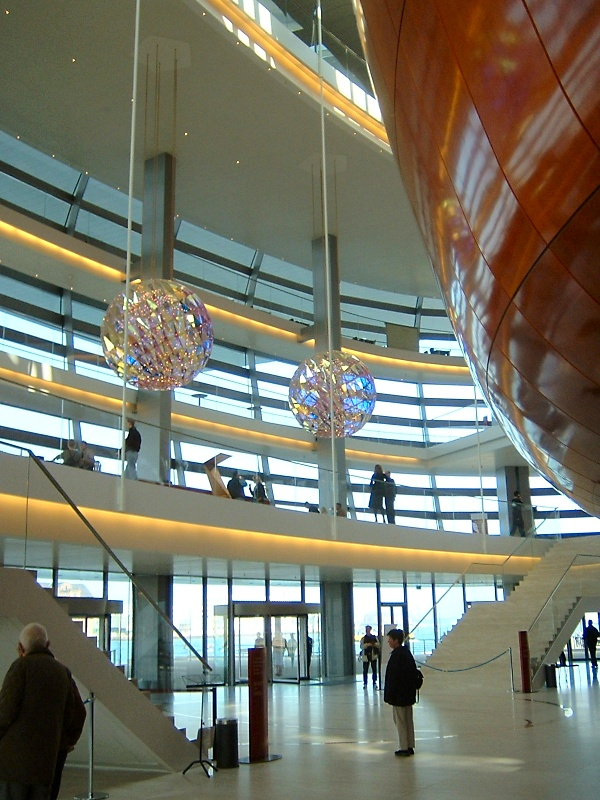
The foyer

The building was designed by architect Henning Larsen in close and often problematic collaboration with Mærsk Mc-Kinney Møller. Mærsk wanted the building to have several features in its design: it would not become obsolete in function and appearance due to any fiscal compromise. He personally tested seats and materials, he visited many places in the world to see how opera buildings were constructed and how the building materials were looking after having been exposed over time to weather. Henning Larsen, on the other hand, was trying to make sure that the original architectural ideas were carried through the construction process, especially concerning the large glass surface front, which became a matter of great controversy and subsequent compromise.

The building exterior is faced with Jura Gelb, a beige limestone quarried in Germany. It is situated on ground that is surrounded by canals that are designed to give the impression the structure is on an island. The bridges constructed to access the building were made from oak trees originally planted in the 19th century for use in replacing the national fleet that was lost with the bombardment of Copenhagen in September 1807. The front of the building was originally designed with large glazing panels in order to see the shell of the auditorium from the harbor side. However, Mærsk emphasized that glass does not age well, so the façade was changed to a metal grid. The front façade of the building was designed and built by Austrian façade specialists Waagner-Biro.

The foyer floor is Sicilian Perlatino marble. The central foyer holds three spherical chandeliers created by the Icelandic artist Olafur Eliasson. Each chandelier consists of several pieces of glass, which are semipermeable allowing some light to pass, and some to reflect. The patterns change when viewed from different angles. Designer and artist Per Arnoldi designed the logo for the opera, visible in the marble floor just inside the entrance. Painter and sculptor Per Kirkeby (1938–2018) created four bronze reliefs for the wall to the auditorium, just below the maple wood part. Per Arnoldi also designed the Front curtain for the main stage, made of multiple color threads creating a three-dimensional effect, that does not reproduce well in photographs.

The rear wall of the foyer and balcony faces are maple. The architects' original intention was to make the wood look like that from an old violin. However using the same technique would have been far too expensive. Instead, they have tried to imitate the color using more traditional staining techniques, and the result is very close (the official homepage says differently, but the guides in the Opera tell this story). Due to the orange color and its form, it is suitably known by locals as the pumpkin.

The auditorium ceiling is gilded with about 105,000 sheets of almost pure carat (100%) gold leaf. The floor in the main auditorium is smoked oak. The balcony faces have been designed with openings in a special pattern to improve sound quality, and LED-based lighting that can be illuminated in a variety of patterns.

== Controversy ==
After the inauguration of the Opera, architect Larsen wrote a critical book about the building and how it was built. Larsen distances himself from the opera house and calls it a "mausoleum" for Mærsk Mc-Kinney Møller and "without comparison the most owner-infected [bygherreinficerede] 'worst-case' in my fifty years as an independent architect—squeezed between the Phantom of the Opera himself [i.e., Mærsk Mc-Kinney Møller], shipping magnates, and lawyers." It is unusual for an architect to publish disparaging criticism of one of their own buildings and the owner who commissioned the work. Larsen was offended by the way Mærsk Mc-Kinney Møller treated him and his building, which the book documents in detail. Thus the book is a rare and interesting document in terms of both architectural and cultural history.

== Transport ==
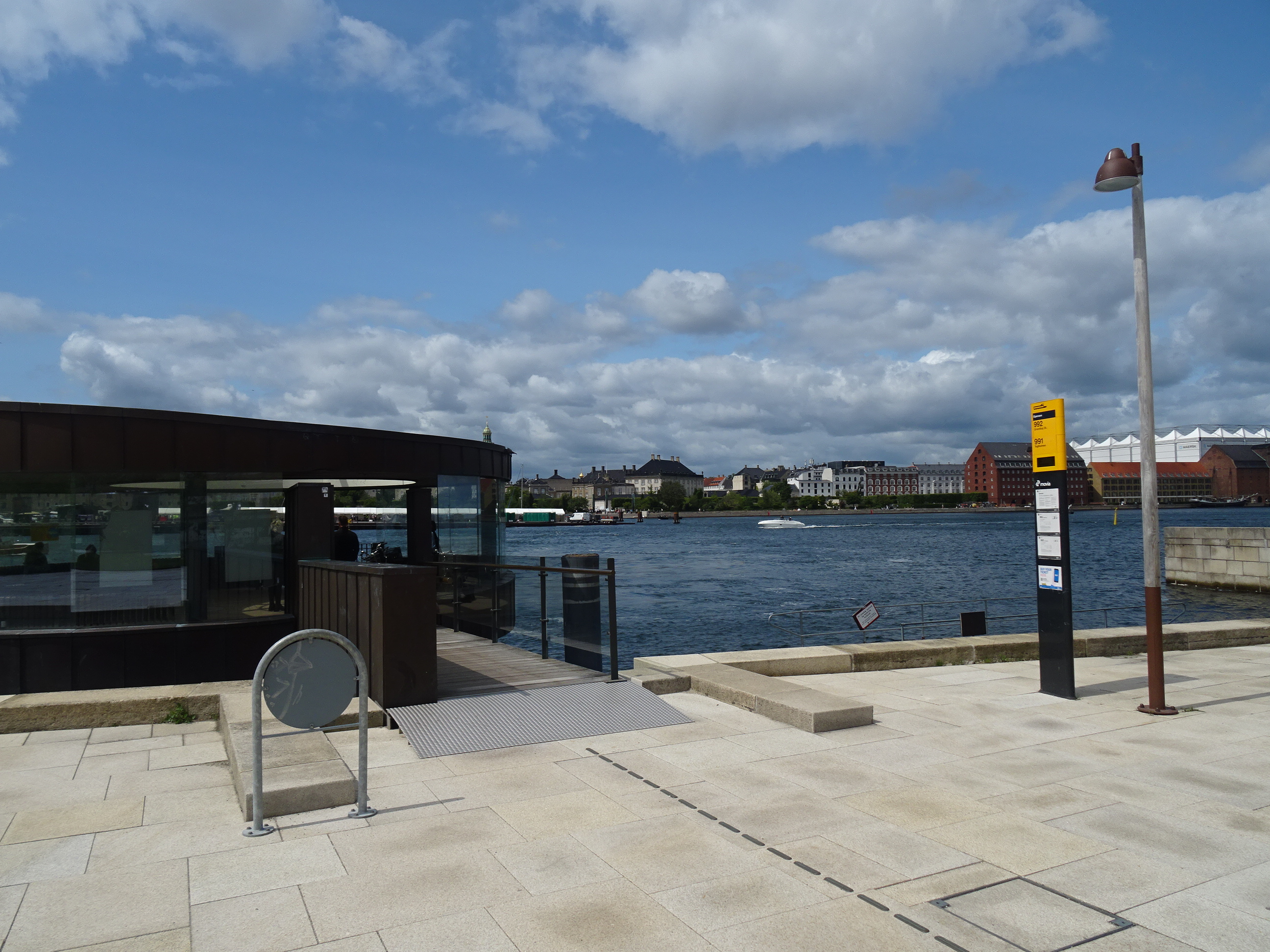
Bus stop in front of Opera

Route 903 of the Copenhagen Harbour Buses shuttles between Nyhavn and the Opera from 7-23 from Monday-Friday and from 10 to 23 on weekends. The opera is also served by Harbour Buses Routes 901 & 902, connecting it to various other points along the harbourfront. Route 66 connects the Opera House to the Central Station. As of 2015, the end station of bus 9A is Operaen as well.
