= Teglholmen =

Peninsula in Denmark

Coordinates: 55°39′00″N 12°33′20″E

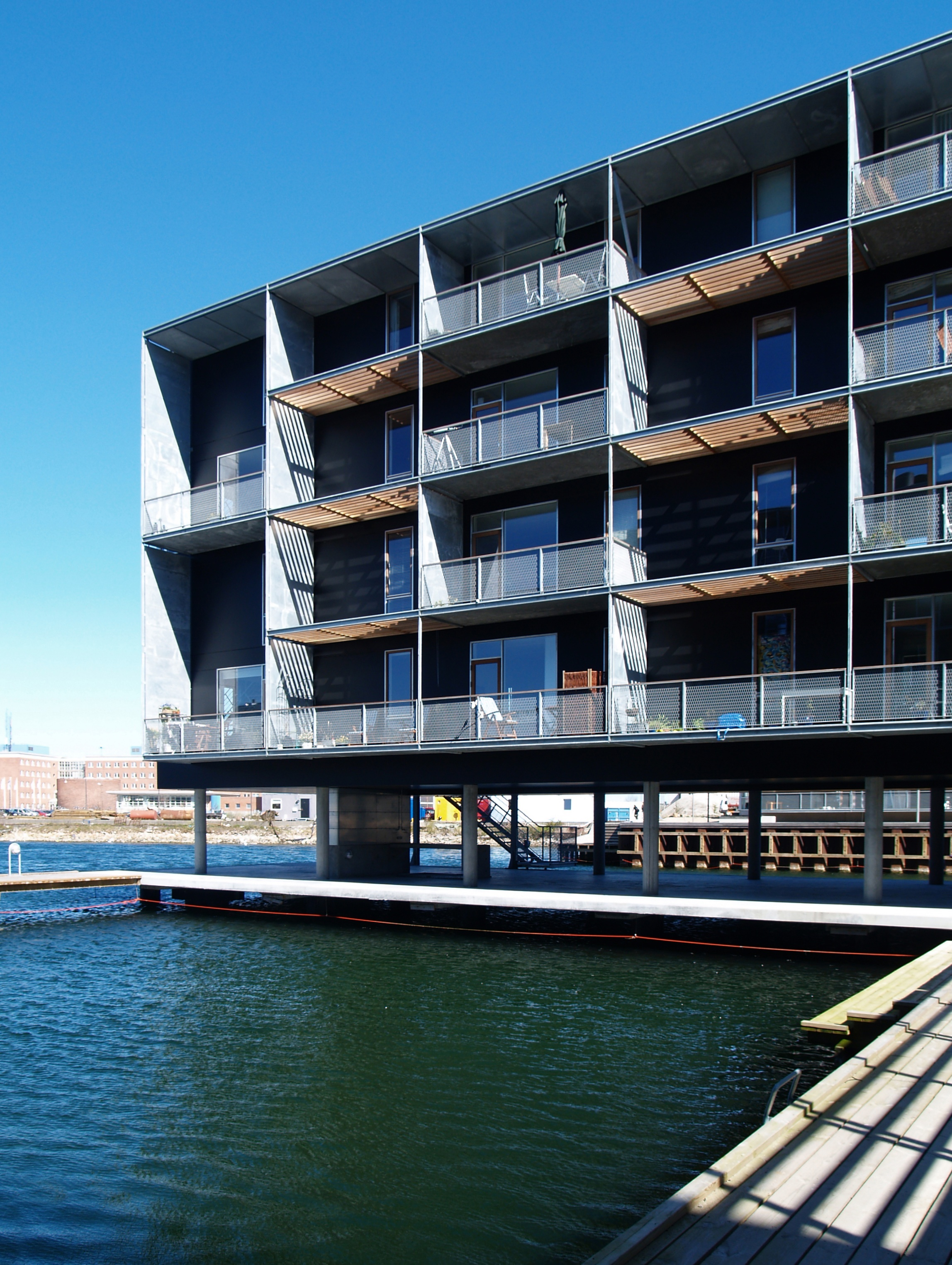
Residential building at Teglholmen, designed by Tegnestuen Vandkunsten

Teglholmen (English: The Tiles Islet) is a peninsula in the South Harbour of Copenhagen, Denmark, located between Sluseholmen and Enghave Brygge. The former dockland area used to house heavy industry. While some industry activities remain in the area, but since most industry left the area, starting in the 1970s, it has undergone massive redevelopment, though some industrial activities remain, most notably MAN B&W Diesel's motor development plant. Today the area houses both a considerable number of Danish and regional headquarters of multinational companies and residential developments. Teglholmen is home to Aalborg University's AAU Cph Campus as well as TV 2's activities in Copenhagen.

== History ==
Teglholmen takes its name from a tile works which established in the area in 1871, for many years supplying particularly Vesterbro with tiles. Around World War I, the tile works closed and the extensive clay pit was turned into a new harbour basin by connecting it to the main harbour, forming what is today known as Teglværkshavnen, separating Teglholmen from Sluseholmen. The next generation of companies to establish in the area were shipyards, foundries and a car assembly plant.

In the 1970s, the industrial activities in the Teglholmen area started to close and from the end of the 1990s, a number of multinational companies started to establish Danish or Regional headquarters at Teglværkshavnen. From the middle of the 2000s, Teglholmen also started to attract residential developments. In 2006, Odense-based TV2 collected its Copenhagen activities in a new media house at Teglholmen.

== Teglholmen today ==
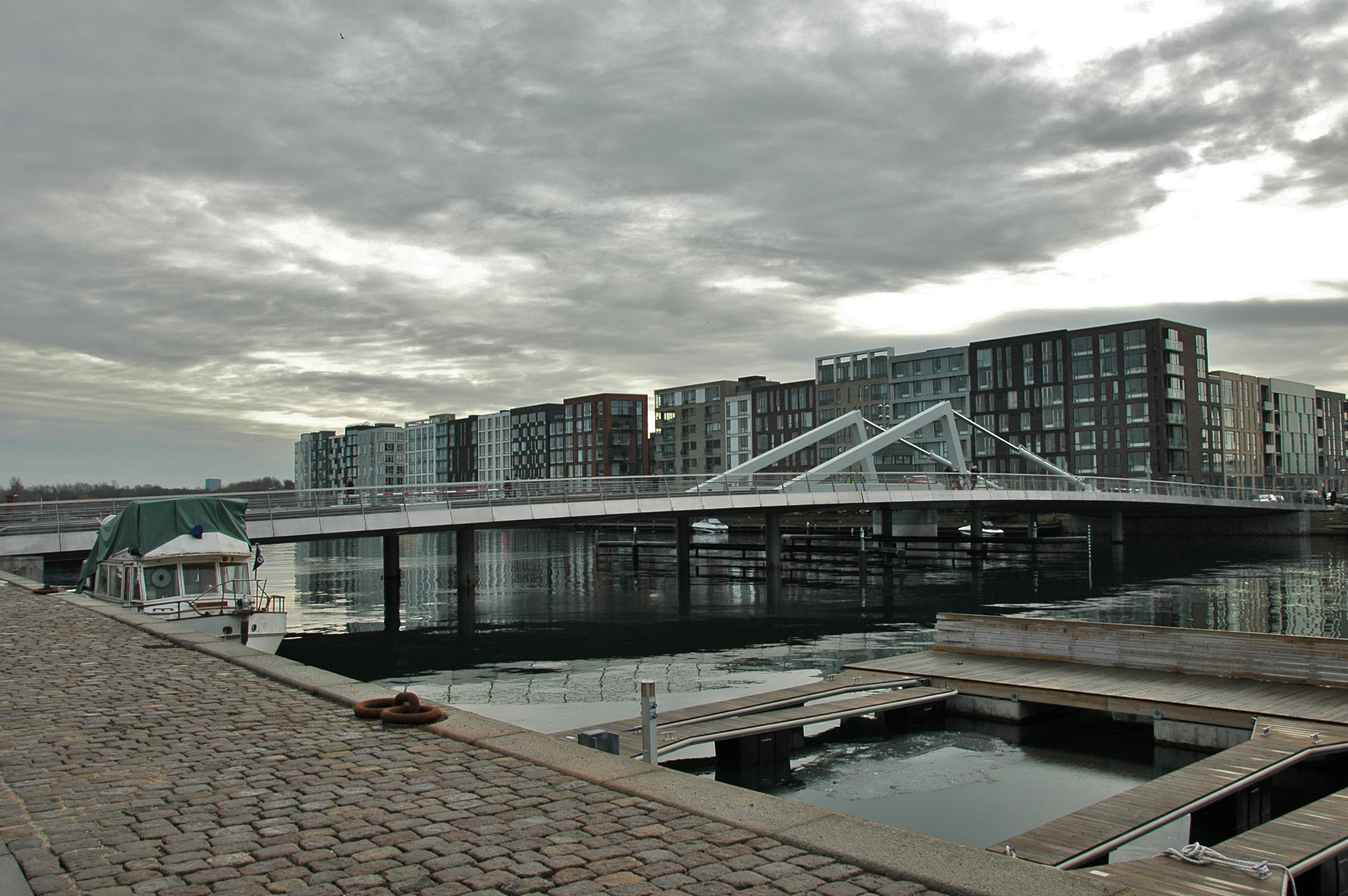
Teglværksbroen

The residential areas at Teglholmen are created as a continuation of the canal district at Sluseholmen. Companies located at Teglholmen include Nokia, Philips, Ericsson and TV2 .

In 2011, a bridge connecting Teglholmen to Sluseholmen opened. The bridge is designed by Danish architectural firm Hvidt & Mølgaard.

== Transport ==
Since September 2009, Teglholmen has been served by routes 991 and 992 of the Copenhagen Harbour Buses.

Telgholmen is currently served by a single bus line, the 7A, operated by Movia. This line connects Telgholmen to the rest of Sydhavnen to Ny Ellebjerg Station, and to the city center.

From 2024, the southern branch of the M4 line of the Copenhagen Metro will pass underneath Teglholmen via tunnel. However, no station will be located on Teglholmen itself. Instead, those who wish to access the metro will have to cycle or walk to neighboring Enghave Brygge or Sluseholmen, and use the stations there. The new metro line connects Ny Ellebjerg and the Sydhavn district to the city center.

== See also ==
- Enghave Brygge
