= Copenhagen Harbour Buses =

Water bus system in Copenhagen, Denmark

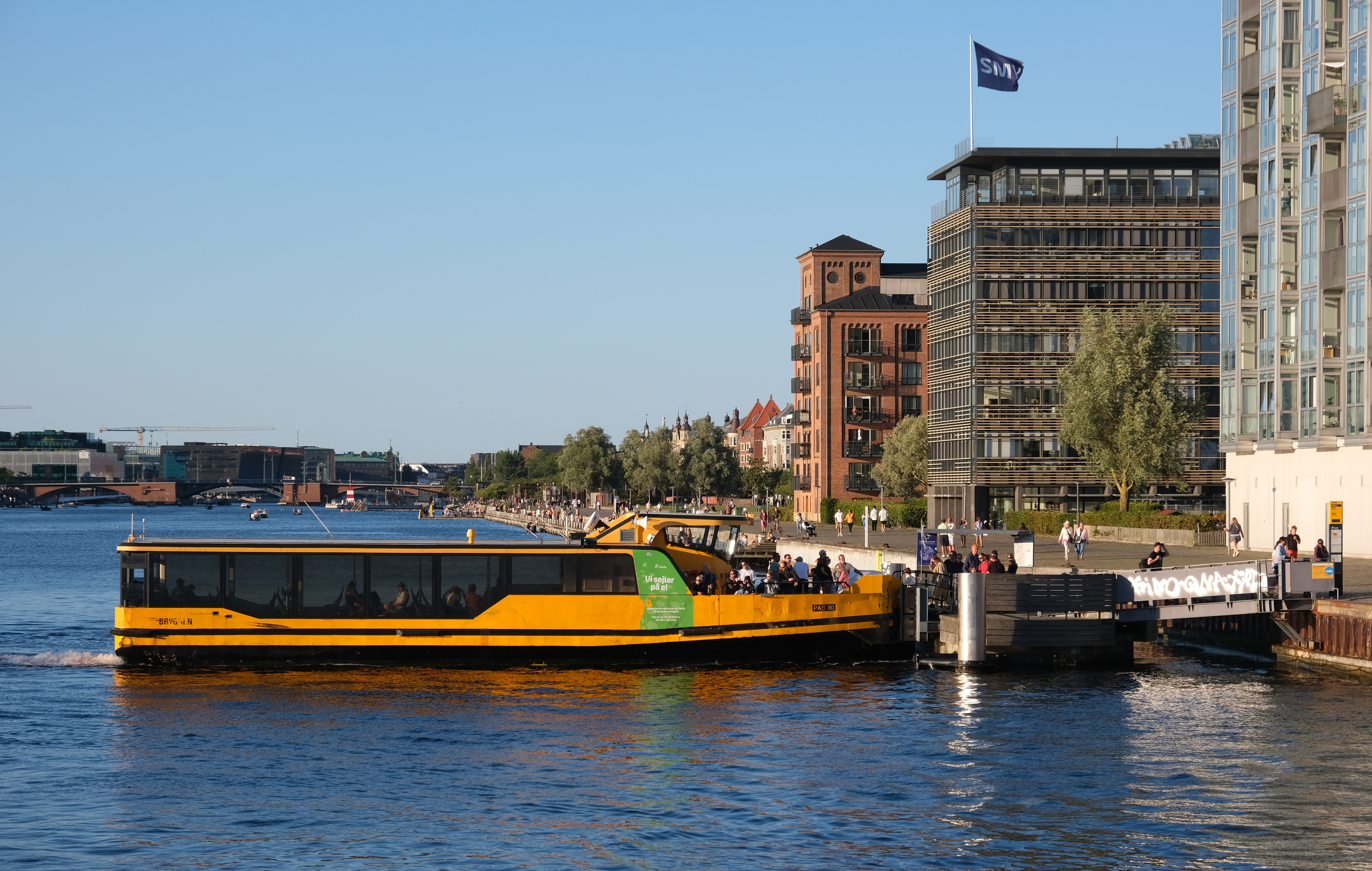
- Bryggebroen station for the Harbor Bus
- Locale: Copenhagen, Denmark
- Waterway: Copenhagen Harbour
- Transit type: Commuter boats, ferries and tourist/leisure services
- Operator: Movia
- Began operation: 2000
- No. of lines: 3
- No. of terminals: 11
- Website: website

The Copenhagen Harbour Buses (Danish: Københavns Havnebusser) is a system of water buses along the harbourfront of Copenhagen, Denmark, operated by Movia which also operates the city’s regular buses. The system is notable for being all-electric, using battery-powered equipment which charge at night. There is also replenishment at station stops during the day. There are seven harbor buses, all belonging to the transport company Arriva, which were delivered from Damen Shipyards Kozle in Kędzierzyn-Koźle, Poland in 2020. Six of them are used in daily operations, but the seventh is a reserve. The Harbour Buses are integrated into the Copenhagen public transport system with the same payment system as buses, Metro or DSB trains.

== Routes and stops ==
The Copenhagen Harbour Buses network has three routes, serving a total of 11 different stops along the harbourfront, seven on Zealand-side and four on Amager-side. The network was rationalised in the 2010s, with the former routes 901, 902 and 904 merged into one route running the entire span of the harbour, using two different numbers depending on the direction. The Opera shuttle route was retained, but renumbered from 903 to 993.

=== 991 & 992 ===
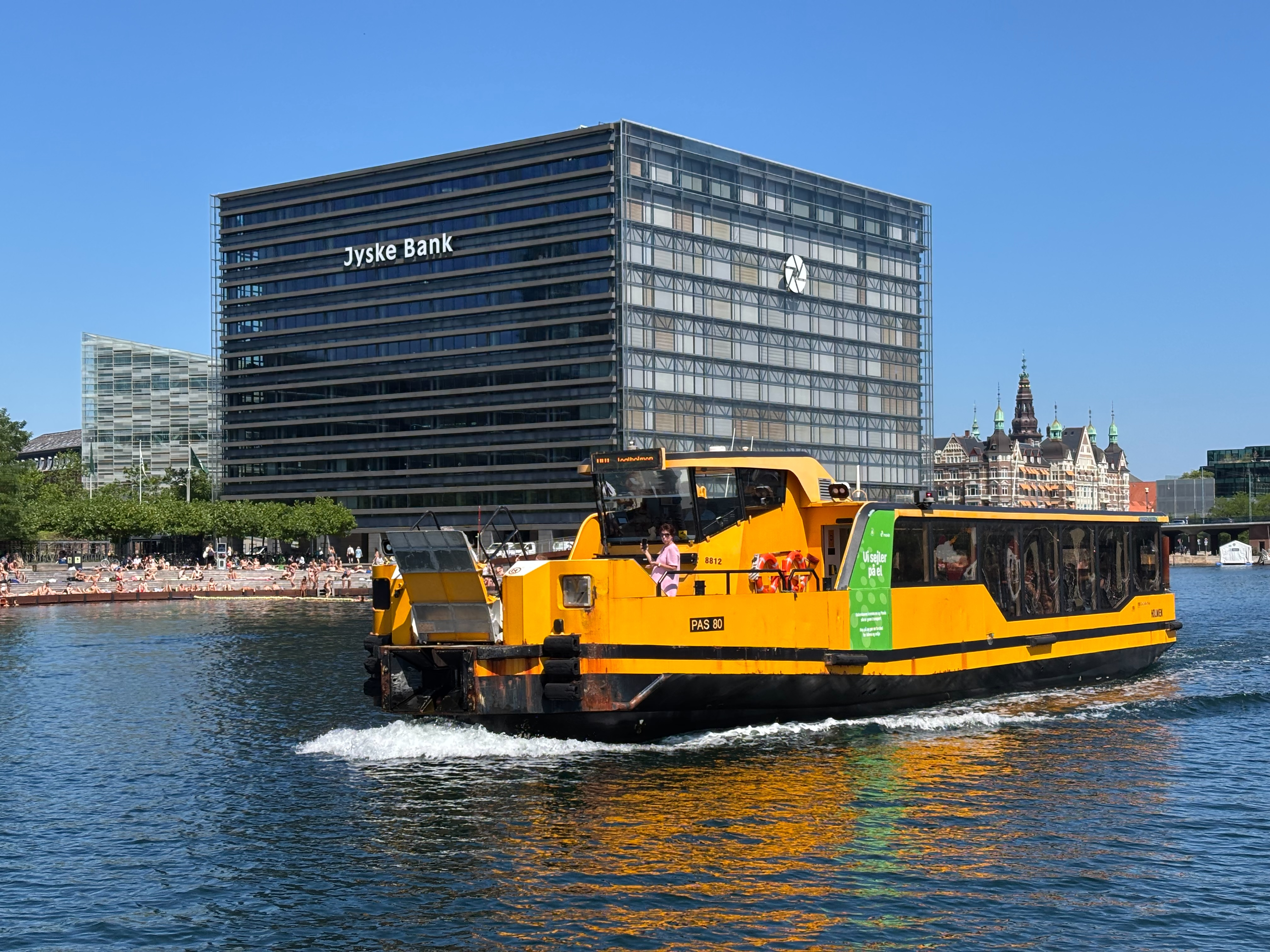
Holmen along the harbourfront

Routes 991 and 992 serves the following bus stops in opposite directions, 991 going south and 992 going north through the harbour. The following are the stops on both routes in the running order of the 991 (southwards) - 992 does the same stops in reverse direction:

- Orientkaj
- Refshaleøen
- Nordre Toldbod
- Holmen North
- Copenhagen Opera House
- Nyhavn
- Knippelsbro
- Royal Danish Library
- Bryggebroen
- Islands Brygge Syd
- Enghave Brygge
- Teglholmen

=== 993 ===
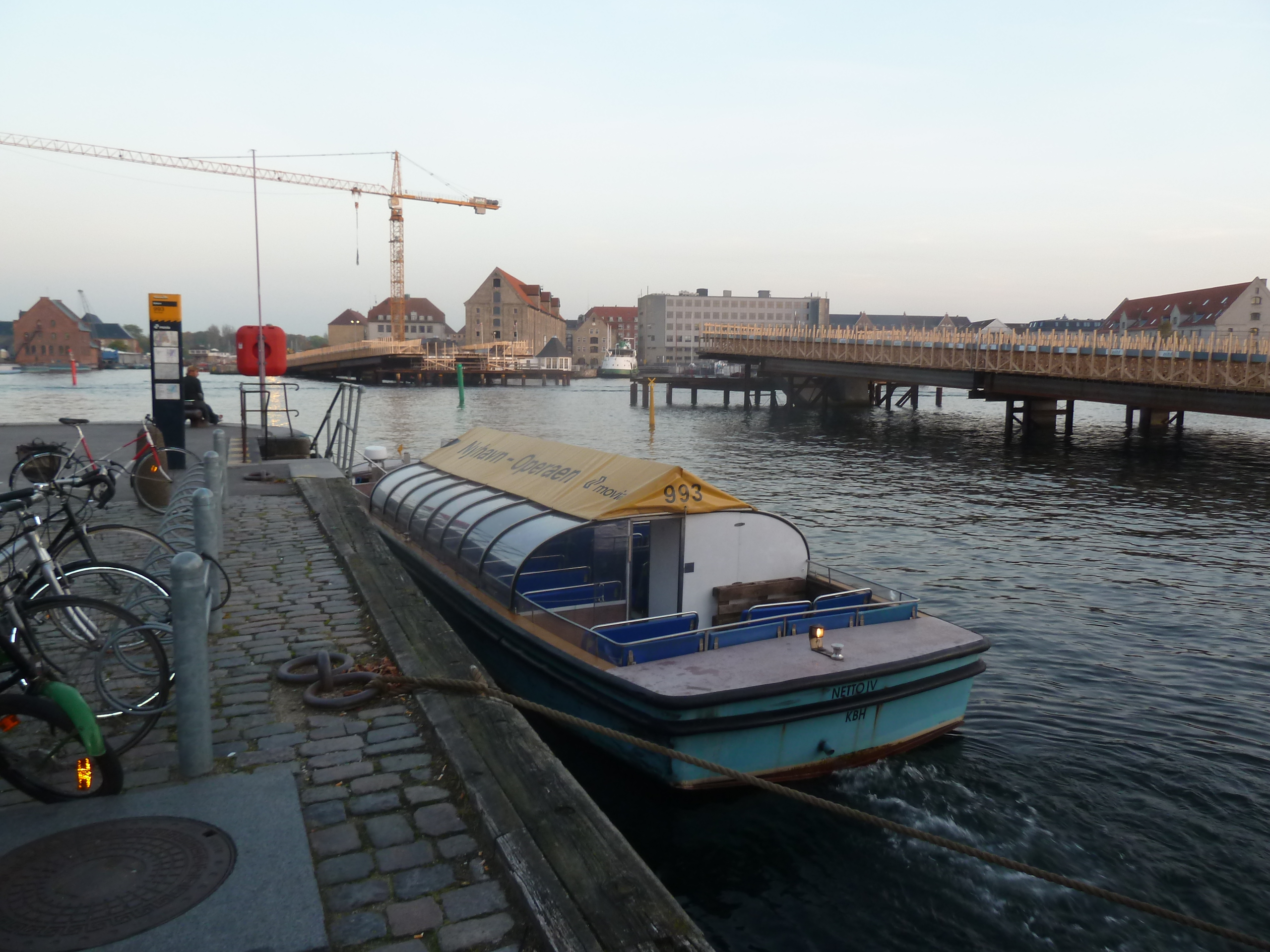
Movia harbour bus line 993

Route 993 serves as a shuttle service between Nyhavn, Experimentarium and the Opera, Monday-Friday from 09:00-18:00, and between the Opera and Nyhavn only between 18:00-23:00.

== See also ==
- Copenhagen City Bikes
- DFDS Canal Tours
