= Movia (transit agency) =

Danish public transport agency

Trafikselskabet Movia

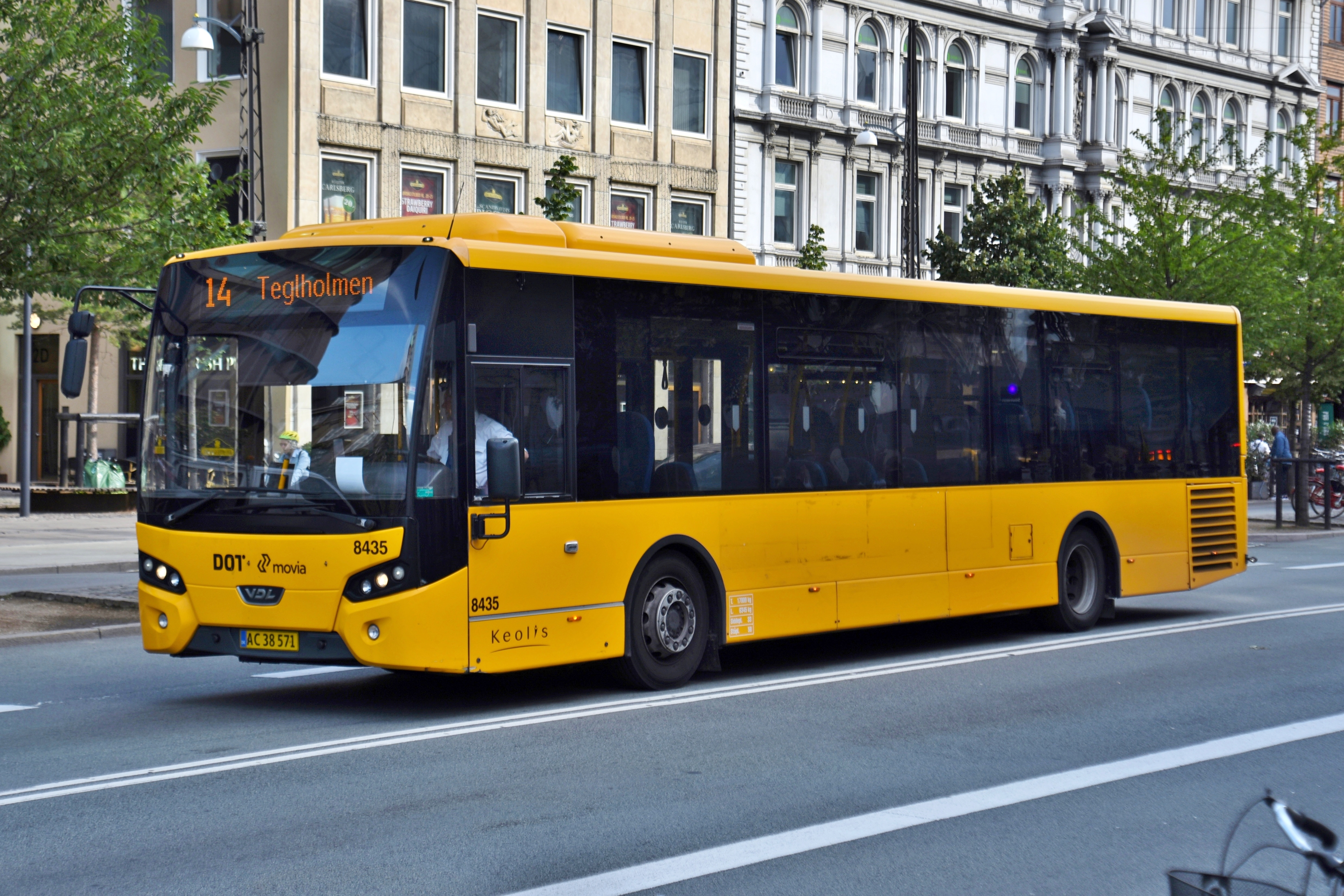
- Movia VDL Citea on Copenhagen bus line 14

Agency overview
- Formed: 1 January 2007
- Type: Transit agency
- Jurisdiction: Hovedstaden; Sjælland
- Headquarters: Copenhagen
- Website: www.movia.dk

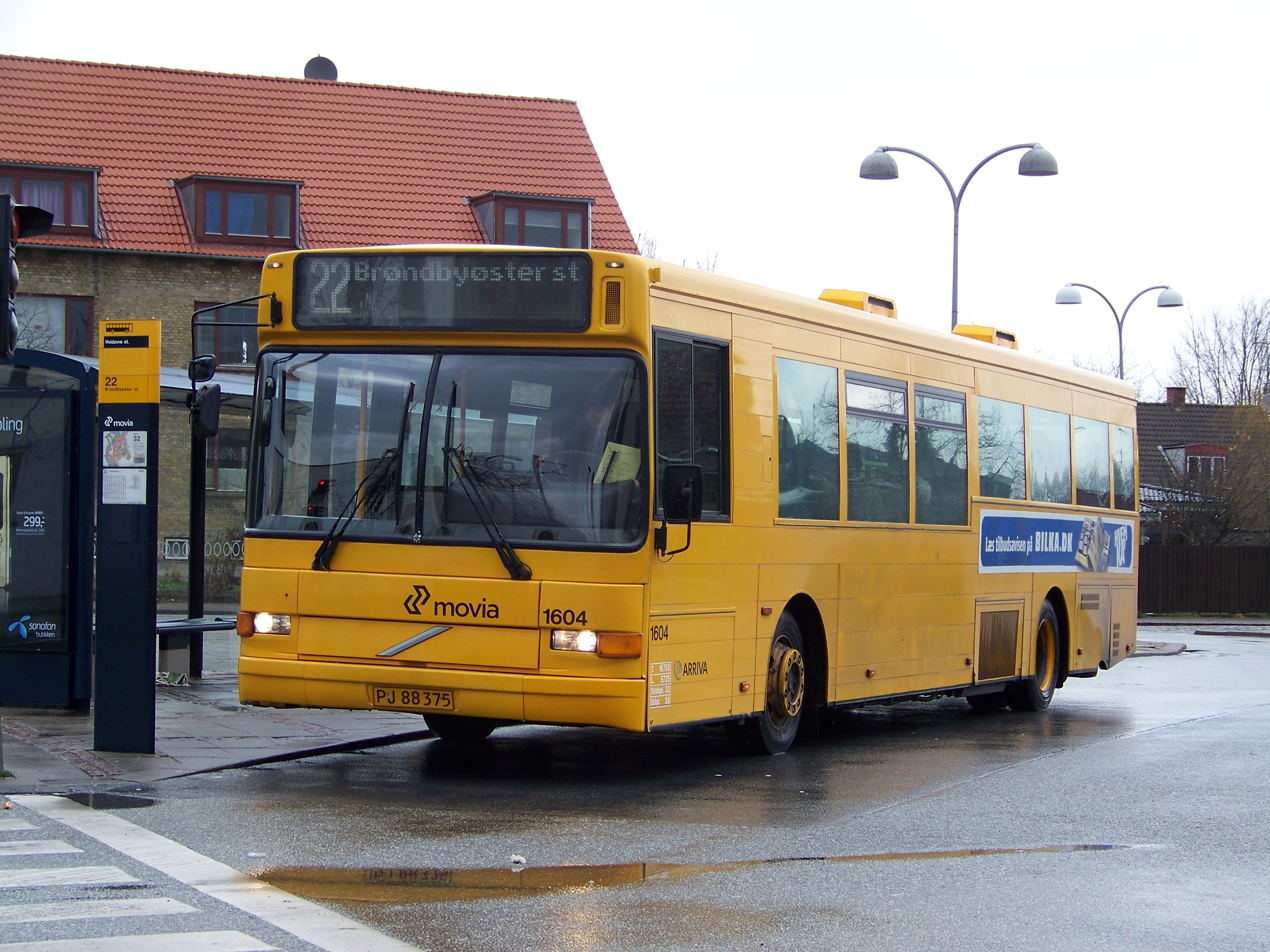
Arriva Volvo bus as Movia route 22 toward Brøndbyøster station. Here seen at Hvidovre station.

Trafikselskabet Movia is the public transport agency that is responsible for buses and certain local railways in Copenhagen and the part of Denmark east of the Great Belt. Its remit covers the regions Sjælland and Hovedstaden, except for Bornholm. The company is owned by the two regions and by the 45 municipalities it services, excluding Bornholm.

It does not own any buses and trains itself, but pays subcontractors to run them. It is a part owner of train company Lokaltog, and has an integrated fare system in collaboration with the Copenhagen metro and DSB, which means that the same tickets are valid on all buses and trains.

== History ==
Movia was created on January 1, 2007, as part of the 2007 municipal reform. Its predecessors were the county transit agencies of the old Vestsjællands Amt and Storstrøms Amt, and HUR Trafik which covered the old "capital region" consisting of Roskilde Amt, Frederiksborg Amt, and Københavns Amt (plus the independent municipalities of Copenhagen and Frederiksberg). Each of the three agencies had its own integrated fare system, which have been continued by Movia as three distinct "fare areas", with small changes to the existing inter-agency fare rules.

The agency implemented a new fare system which replaced most paper tickets by contactless smartcards. It is fully implemented in the western Zealand (Vestsjælland) and southern Zealand (Sydsjælland) fare areas, and in the capital area (Hovedstadsområdet).

== Services ==
Movia has eleven night bus lines which operate between the hours of 01:00 and 05:00. Buses generally depart on the hour or every second hour. Bus stop signs of night bus routes are recognisable by their grey colour. Various A-bus, S-bus and R-bus lines also have departures at night or have departures at night after Friday and Saturday.

== See also ==
- CityCirkel
- Copenhagen Harbour Buses
- Transport in Copenhagen
