= Enghave Brygge =

Waterfront area of Copenhagen, Denmark

Coordinates: 55.6555°N 12.5603°E

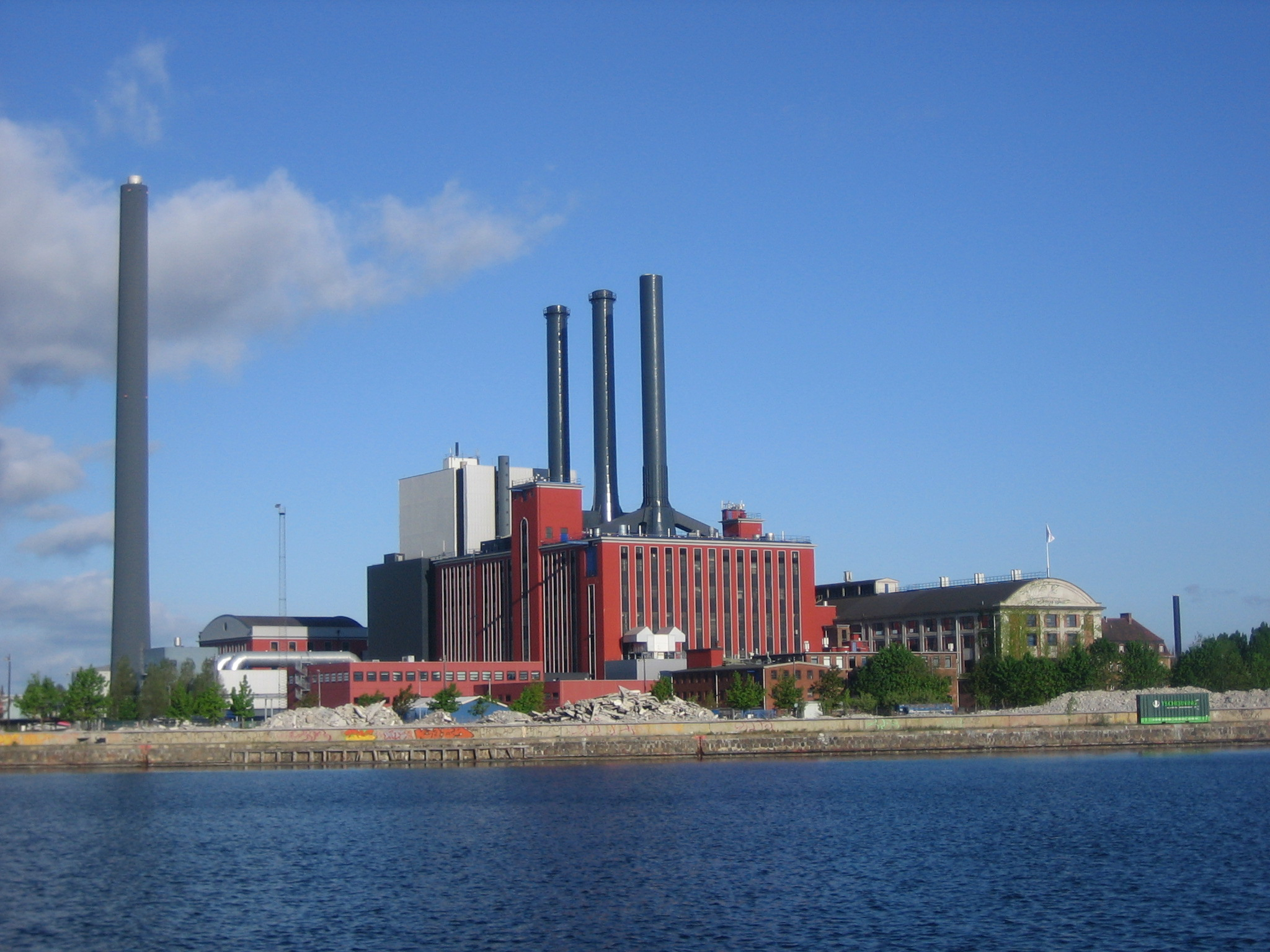
Enghave Brygge with H. C. Ørsted Power Station.

Enghave Brygge (English: Enghave Quay) is a waterfront area in the Southern Docklands of Copenhagen, Denmark. It is located between Vesterbro to the north and Frederiks Brygge to the south, and opposite Islands Brygge across the water. The area is undergoing significant development, with the northern half now housing around 2.000 inhabitants, and construction of apartment blocks in the southern half is underway. Enghave Brygge is characterized by canals, giving the area the impression of a maritime city like Venice or Amsterdam, as well as the nearby Christianshavn neighbourhood. The Enghave Canal which runs from north to south across Enghave Brygge is a major defining landmark. The 11 artificial isles are collectively also referred to as Engholmene.

== History ==
The oldest part of the area was reclaimed in 1904. In the 1910s and 1920s, it was gradually expanded with more reclaimed land. The area was initially mostly used for the storage of coal. The H. C. Ørsted Power Station was constructed in 1916. Dur to the area's infamous reputation for being a hang-out for tramps and other seedy characters, it became colloquially as Fjævleøen (Devil's Island).

== Redevelopment ==
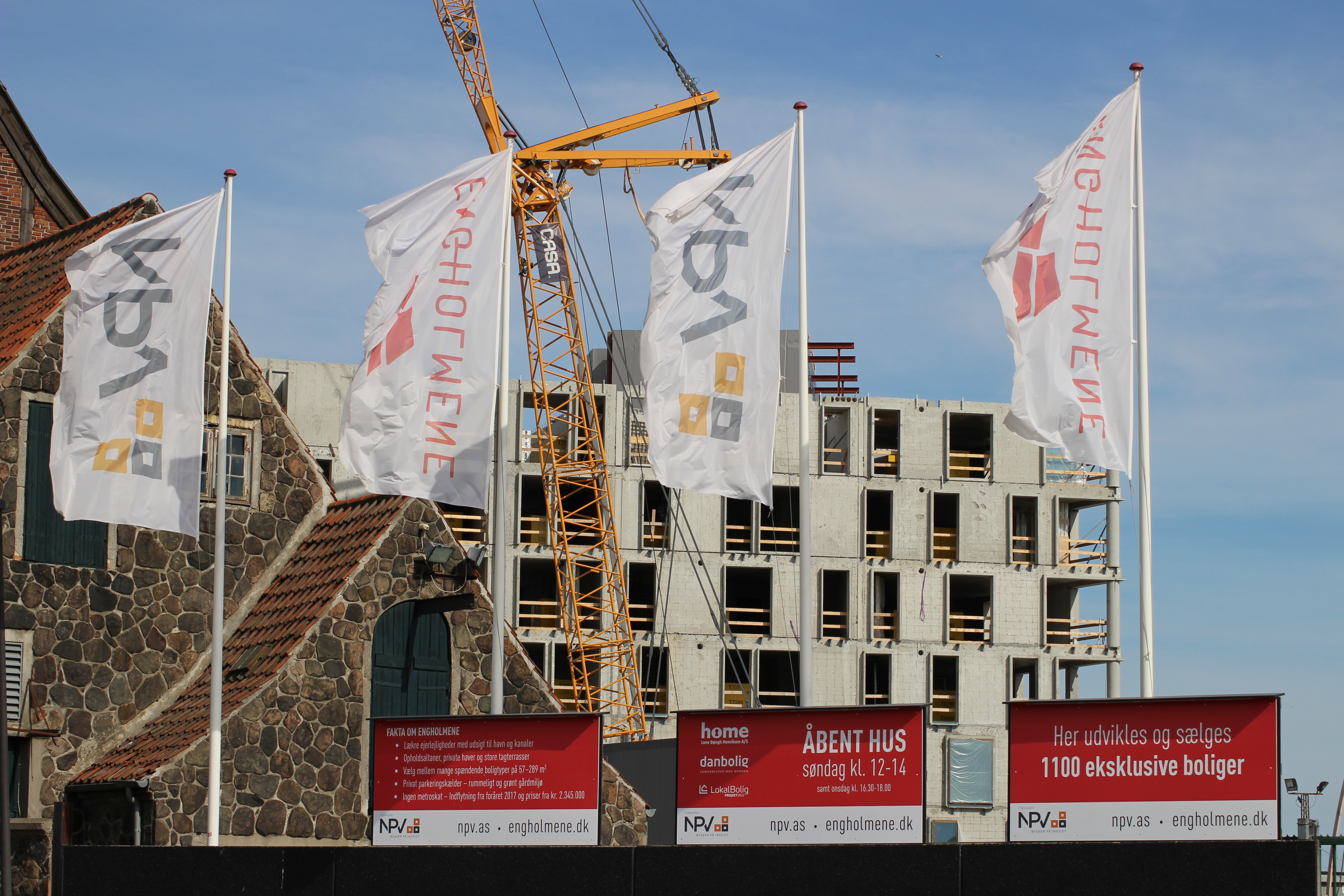
Engholmene construction site in 2016.

The plan for Enghave Brygge has been created by Juul Frost Arkitekter, Gröning Arkitekter and Danielsen Architecture in collaboration with the city. The area will comprise 2,400 apartments and about 37.800 square metres of commercial and retail space. A central element in the plan was the creation of a 700 metres long canal, Enghave Canal, which will be a modern equivalent to Christianshavn Canal on the other side of the harbor. The buildings along the water will be located on 11 individual "islands". A greenspace will mark the transition to H. C. Ørsted Power Station.

== Historic buildings ==
The former head office and warehouse of Petersen og Albeck (Alva Myrdals Plads 3, formerly, Fiskerigade 6), now renamed Uniscrap and headquartered elsewhere, was built in 1918–1920 to design by Gustav Bartholin Hagen.

== Transport ==
Enghave Brygge station on the M4 Line was opened in June 2024. Bridges will connect Enghave Brygge to Teglholmen to the south and across the harbor to the southern part of Islands Brygge.

== Cultural references ==
Enghave Brygge is seen in silhouet st 0:42:28 in the first Olsen Gang film. In The Last Exploits of the Olsen Gang (1974), Bøffen (Ove Verner Hansen) tries to make Egon (Ove Sprogøe) "disappear and stay disappeared" by embedding his feet in a concrete block and dumping him into the harbor from a crane at one of the scrapyards on Enghave Brygge (1:12:25). Enghave Brygge is also used as a location at 0:43:46 in The Olsen Gang on the Track. Enghave Brygge is also used as a location at 0:28:00 in The Olsen Gang Outta Sight.

== See also ==
- Vesterbro
- Frederiks Brygge
