= Kongens Enghave =

District of Copenhagen, Denmark

Coordinates: 55.6633°N 12.5361°E

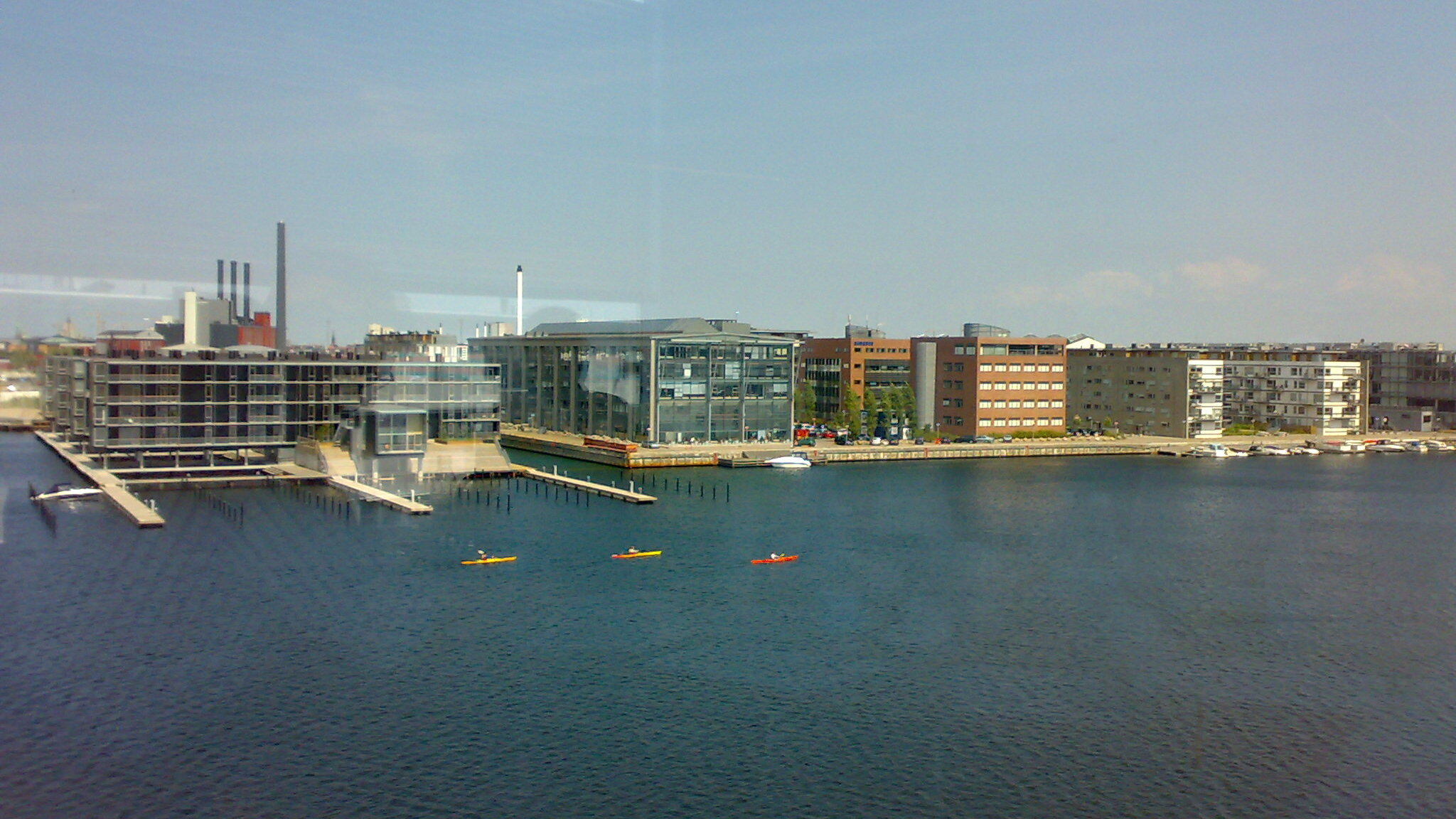
Kayaks in front of the newer harbour-facing residential parts of Sydhavnen

Kongens Enghave ("king's meadow"), commonly known as Sydhavnen ("south harbour") or the postal district of 2450 Copenhagen SV (southwest) is a district in southern Copenhagen. While its core is a largely pre-WWII former working class district, it also contains an upscale residential area along the harbour having been developed after 2000, scattered industrial areas, large parks such as Valbyparken and Sydhavnstippen, allotment gardens and parts of Vestre Kirkegård, the city's largest cemetery.

The area has historically been a working class quarter, dissected by major transport corridors and characterized by industry along the harbour-front. Since the turn of the millennium, this picture is starting to change. While the central parts of the district in general remains a relatively poor neighbourhood with social challenges, the harbour-front areas of Sluseholmen and Teglholmen have undergone massive redevelopment into new residential neighbourhoods. A cluster of IT and telecommunications companies have also emerged in the area. The former Nokia Copenhagen headquarter is now occupied by a branch of Aalborg University. However, the traditional parts of the district still haven't undergone the gentrification process seen in more central former working class areas such as Vesterbro and Nørrebro.

== Transport ==
The central parts of Sydhavnen are served by Sydhavn and Sjælør station of the S-train system. There are also several bus lines. The Øresund Railway (to Copenhagen Airport and Malmö) traverses the district mostly underground, but does not have any stations here.

A metro branch line, the M4 opened in 2024. It serves three stations in the district (Enghave Brygge, Sluseholmen and Mozarts Plads) as well as two stations bordering the district (Havneholmen and the hub of København Syd).

== Geography ==
Kongens Enghave covers an area of 4.46 km^{2}, has a population of 15,414 and a population density of 3,455 per km^{2} (2008). It used to be one of 15 administrative districts of Copenhagen, but since an administrative reform in 2006-08, it has been part of the official district of Vesterbro/Kongens Enghave.

Kongens Enghave is bounded by the Carlsberg area to the north, Vesterbro to the north-east and Valby to the west, while Copenhagen Harbour to the east and south separates it from Amager Vest.

== History ==
=== Early history ===
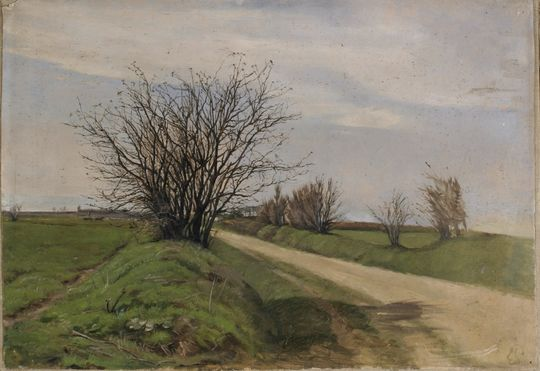
Enghavevej, 1850

Kongens Enghave is first mentioned in 1632. The area was used for harvesting of hay for the royal stables at Copenhagen Castle. In 1776, a small plague hospital was built on Kalvebod Beach. The name Frederiksholm is first seen in 1667–68 when large areas on the coast were reclaimed and drained.

The history of the district dates back to 1795 when the old Enghavevej was built, running all the way from Vesterbrogade to Gammel Køge Landevej by way of present-day Sydhavns Plads and Mozarts Plads. The land was divided into 22 estates at the same event.

From about 1900, a few country houses and farmsteads were built along the road: Frederiksholm, "Larsens Minde", Lises Minde, Frederikslund, Wilhelms Minde as well as a few small cottages, mainly used by fishermen and hunters. Frederiksholm, the only of these houses that still exist today, was built by king Frederick VI. The estate covered about 50 hectares, about half of which was gardens and the remainder meadows. In 1834, it kept about 40 cows and 10 horses. From the 1870s, it served as residence for the manager of Frederiksholm Brickworks.

=== New enterprises ===
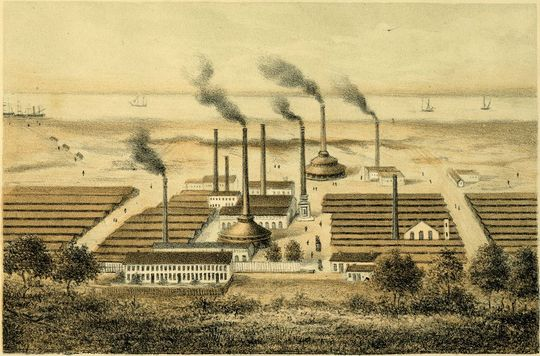
Frederiksholm Brickyard in about 1880

Copenhagen's city walls were decommissioned in 1857, leading to new development in the area.

Vestre Cemetery was established in 1870. In 1871, two brothers, Køhler, purchased the Frederiksholm estate and established a brickyard in the grounds. The storm surge in November 1872 led to widespread floodings in the area. In response, as a private initiative, the Køhler brothers carried out extensive reclamations along the coast, and- Shortly thereafter, they established Frederiksholm Harbour in association with their brickyard. The brick yard produced many of the bricks used in the construction of Vesterbro prior to its closure in 1918.

Karens Minde, a mental institution, was opened by Johan Keller in 1876. Vestre Prison opened in 1895.

=== 20th century urbanization ===
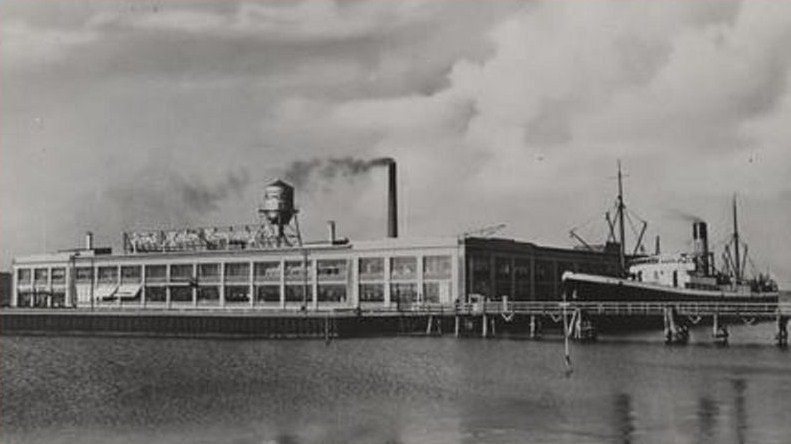
Ford Motor Company's assembly plant in the 1930s

In the beginning of the 20th century, Port of Copenhagen was expanded with extensive docklands with many industrial enterprises in the area. Otto Mønsted opened a margarine factory in 1911. It was joined by Lemvig Møller & Munch and Sømderværftet (1818), a subsidiary of Københavns Flydeværft & Skibsdok. Burmeister & Wain established an iron foundry in the area in 1920 and took over Sønderværftet in 1926. In 1924 Ford Motor Company moved its assembly plant from Nørrebro to the Southern Docklands. The factory was designed by Albert Kahn and opened on 15 November 1924.

The Kongens Enghave district developed around the heavy industry of the Southern Docklands. The residential areas were built to satisfy a demand for housing for the workers and it has thus always been considered a working class neighbourhood.

The Ford assembly plant closed in 1965 and most of the remaining industry disappeared in the 1970s and 80s. Gradually, Kongens Enghave gained a reputation for being the area in Denmark with most people on social welfare, the lowest education rate and life expectancy and high incidence of all major social problems.

=== 21st century ===
In the 1990s, companies such as Nokia, Philips and TDC established in the area. In 2002 a masterplan was adopted for redevelopment of the Southern Docklands. It was created by Copenhagen Municipality, By & Havn and Sjoerd Soeters. This redevelopment, which is still ongoing, has attracted new residents. Dramatically rising real-estate prices and a shortage of cheap accommodation in Copenhagen during the last half of the 1990s and the first half of the 2000s have also drawn new income groups and students to the area. In 2011, Nokia closed their large R&D department in Copenhagen with more than 1,000 employees. Their buildings now house an Aalborg University campus.

== Kongens Enghave today ==
The parts of Kongens Enghave attracting most attention today are the redeveloped harbour-front areas of Sluseholmen and Teglholmen. In particular, the Sluseholmen Canal District is generally recognized as one of the most successful new neighbourhoods in Copenhagen, for which it won the 2009 Danish Urban Planning Award.

The most important green spaces of the Kongens Enghave district include Vestre Cemetery and the semi-natural Sydhavnstippen area.

A cluster of Danish headquarters of multinational companies such as Nokia, Sonofon, Philips, TDC, Statoil, DaimlerChrysler and BMW Group has formed in the Sydhavnen area. Also, as a precedor, and through the takeover, of Burmeister and Wain, MAN Diesel & Turbo has its Danish headquarter on Teglholmen, together with a smaller factory-plant, in which the research and development of diesel-technology takes place, being the last active heavy industry-plant in the area.

== Transport ==
There are two S-train stations located in Kongens Enghave: Sydhavn station and Sjælør station, both of which are on the Køge radial of the S-train network. A third S-train station, serviced by trains on Vestbanen and Frederikssundbanen, is located in Vesterbro, just on the border to Kongens Enghave. The closest mainline train station is Copenhagen South, which served by the 7A bus which runs through Sydhavnen.

Copenhagen Harbour Buses lines 991 and 992 serve Sluseholmen and Teglholmen.

There are also regular buses connecting from Mozarts Plads, Sluseholmen and Teglholmen to the city centre.

A metro line, the M4 opened in 2024, with stations at Mozarts Plads, Enghave Brygge and Sluseholmen - it terminates at Copenhagen South railway station.

== Sports ==
Boldklubben Frem (also known as Frem, BK Frem or BK Frem Copenhagen) is a popular football club based in Valby-Sydhavnen. Frem plays its home games at Valby Idrætspark. Since its foundation in 1886, Frem has won the Danish Championships six times and the Danish Cup twice. Frem fans are especially known for unconditional love and support.

== Attractions ==
- Vestre Cemetery
- Sluseholmen Canal District
