= Sluseholmen Canal District =

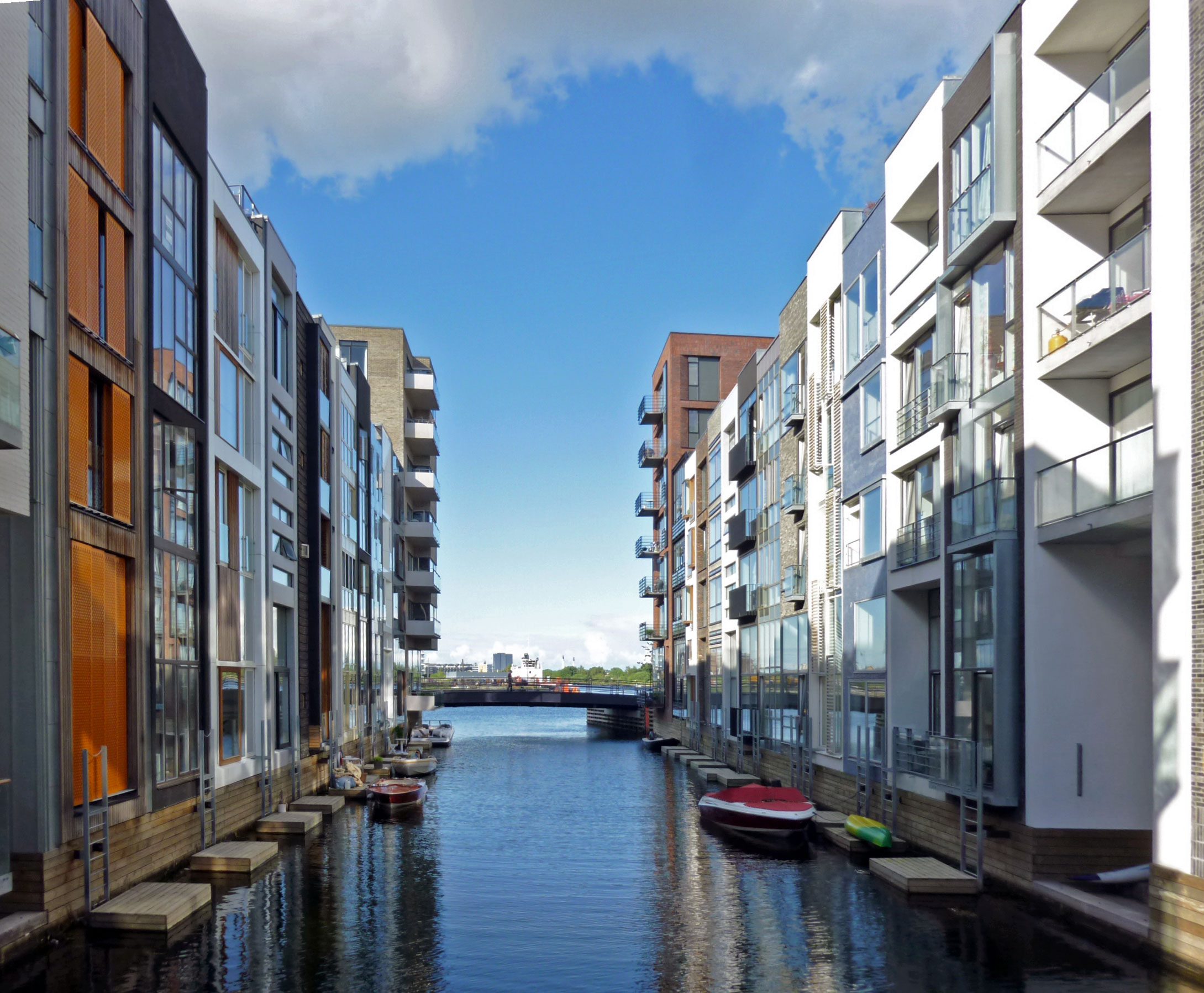
- Interactive map of the Sluseholmen Canal District area

General information
- Type: Mixed-use
- Architectural style: Modern
- Location: The South Harbour
- Coordinates: 55.646°N 12.550°E
- Construction started: 2005
- Completed: 2009

Technical details
- Floor count: 4-7
- Floor area: 135,000 square metres (1,450,000 sq ft)

Design and construction
- Architects: Arkitema; Sjoerd Soeters
- Awards and prizes: 2009 Danish Urban Planning Award

Sluseholmen Canal District (Danish: Sluseholmen Kanalby) is a residential development on the Sluseholmen peninsula in the South Harbour area of Copenhagen, Denmark. The development comprises 1,350 apartments on eight artificial islands, separated by dug-out canals. On each island is an enclosed block of four-to-seven stories, surrounding a sheltered courtyard with public access. The buildings often stand directly on the canals, while bridges, wharfs and "ghats" allow direct contact with the water.

The development was designed by the Danish firm of architects Arkitema in collaboration with the Dutch architects Sjoerd Soeters, but to ensure a varied cityscape the facades of individual townhouses were designed by 20 different architecture practices.

== History ==
The Sluseholmen peninsula used to house heavy industry, including a Ford car factory. As industry left the area, a plan was conceived to develop Sluseholmen into a canal district. This was the result of co-operation between Sjoerd Soeters, Arkitema, the Port of Copenhagen and the City of Copenhagen. Construction started in 2004, the first residents arrived in 2007, and by 2008 development of the new canal district had been completed.

== Architecture ==
The general concept for the area was developed by Sjoerd Soeters and Arkitema, with inspiration from the artificial island residential development in Amsterdam. Arkitema also developed the shell structures.

To ensure a varied cityscape, inspired by Copenhagen vernacular architecture from around 1900, the facades of individual townhouses were designed by 20 different Danish architecture firms. Arkitema drew up a list of rules governing the materials used, colours, and the proportions of the facade designs. It was also decided that at least five different firms had to be involved in the design of each island. The result is lively and imaginative block housing, highly diverse in appearance.
