= Ceres Panorama =

Building in Aarhus, Denmark

Coordinates: 56°09′17.0″N 10°11′27.8″E

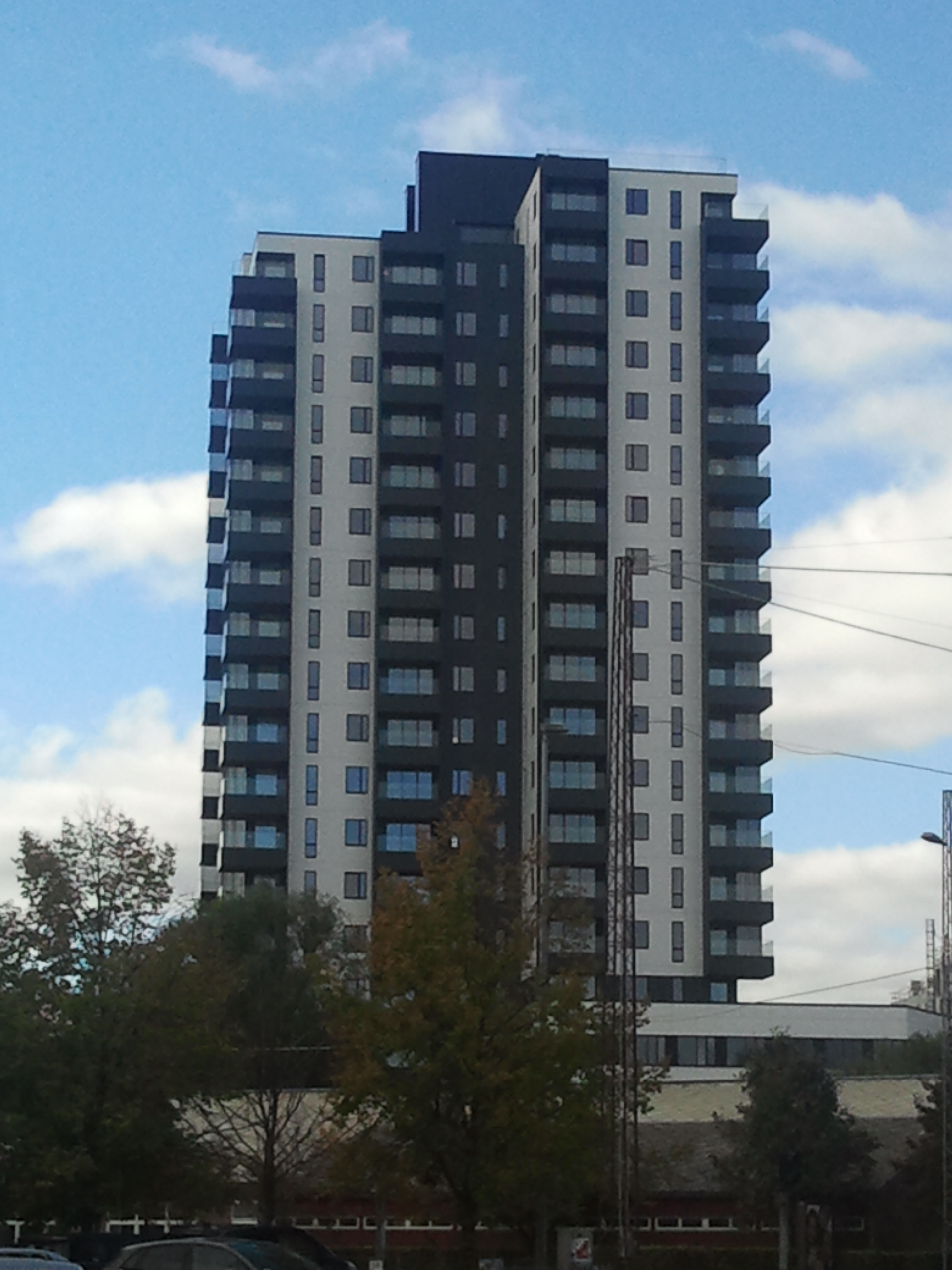
- Ceres Panorama
- Interactive map of the Ceres Panorama area

General information
- Location: Aarhus, Denmark
- Completed: 2016

Height
- Height: 75 meters

Design and construction
- Architect: Schmidt Hammer Lassen
- Engineer: Niras A/S

Ceres Panorama is a high-rise building on Ceres Allé in the CeresByen neighborhood in Aarhus, Denmark. At 75 meters it is the third tallest building in Aarhus after Aarhus Cathedral and Aarhus City Tower and as of 2016, it is the 11th tallest building in Denmark. Ceres Panorama is a residential condominium building with 130 privately owned units. The high-rise was built as the flagship building in the development of the CeresByen neighborhood and with its 20 floors in an area of mainly 8-10 story buildings it makes for a very noticeable landmark.

In the 6.000 m² base of the tower the consulting engineering company Niras A/S will establish new offices.

== Architecture ==
Niras A/S was the engineer on the project, Schmidt Hammer Lassen was the architect and A. Enggaard was the developer and construction was completed in the fall of 2016. The building is shaped as four towers placed next to each other but shifted relative to one another. Ceres Panorama is 18.400 m² spread across 20 floors with a subterranean parking garage for 1200 cars. The building is designed to have 23 differently styled and sized apartments in varying price ranges. The exterior is composed of black and white concrete elements where the black elements are balconies and the white elements are the individual towers. The materials chosen require little maintenance and have been selected for their ability to age well and resist dirt and grime.

== See also ==
- Architecture of Aarhus
- List of tallest buildings in Denmark
