= CeresByen =

- Neighborhood
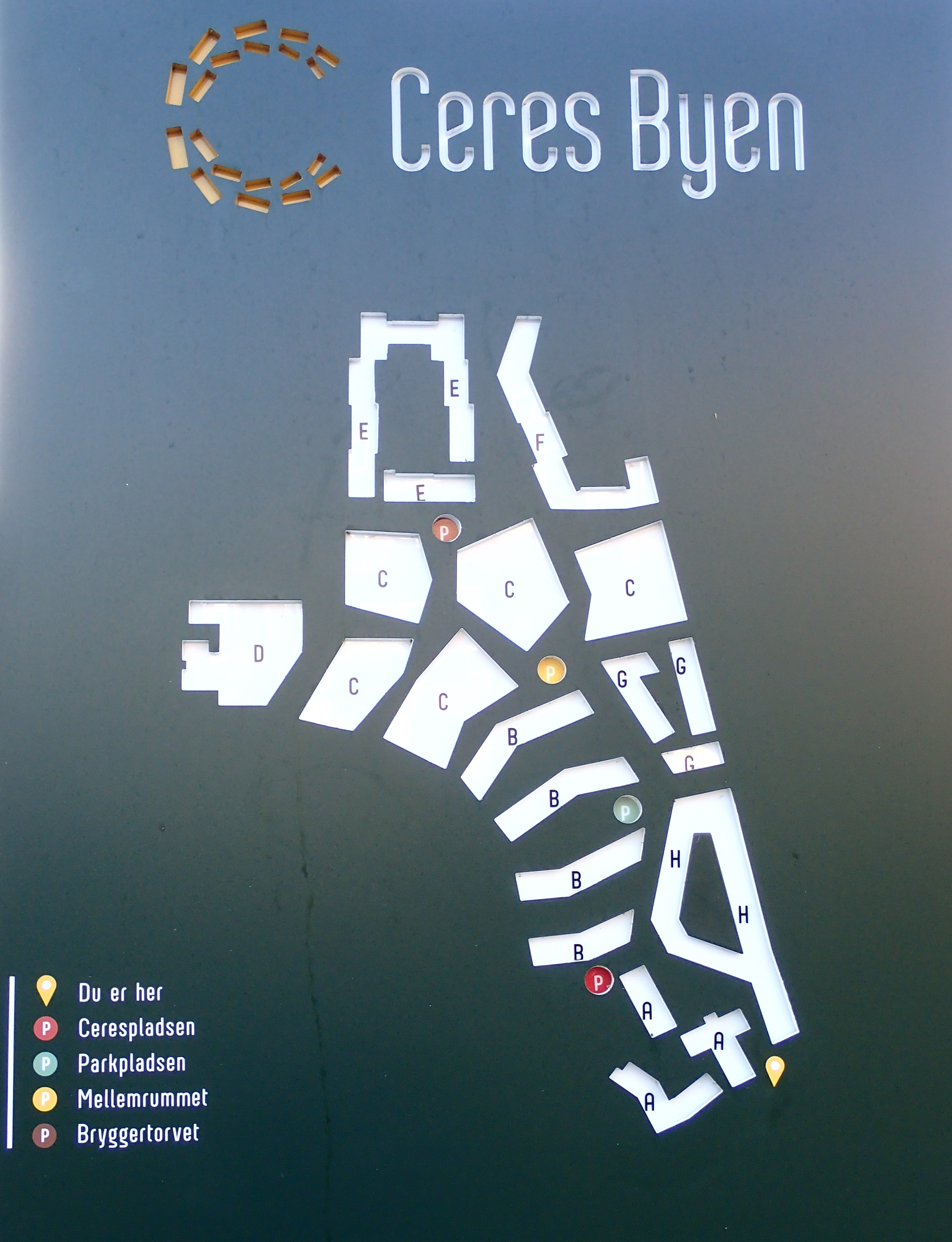
- Plan of CeresByen (north is right)

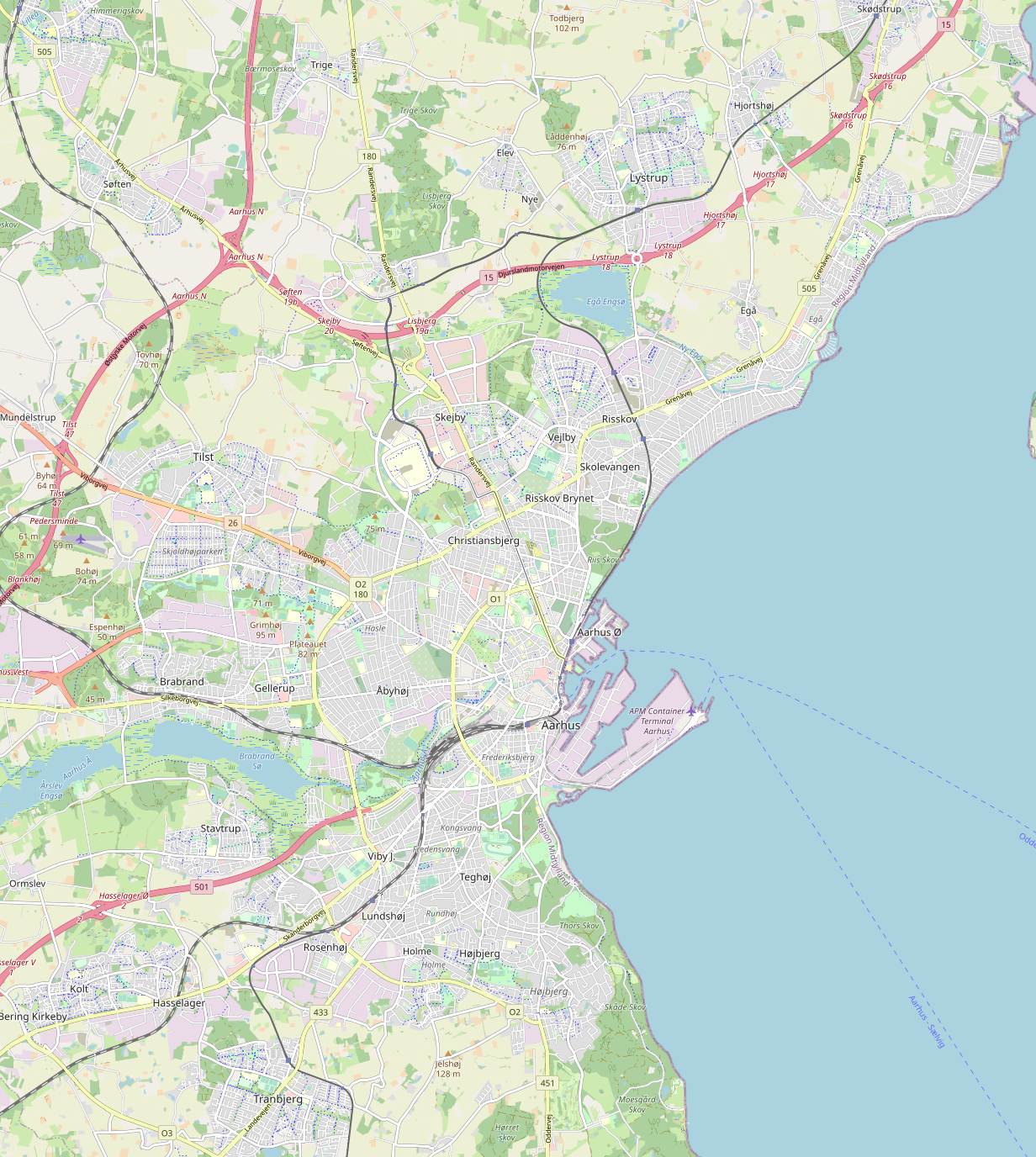
- Location within Aarhus
- Coordinates: 56.155480°N 10.190993°E
- Country: Kingdom of Denmark
- Regions of Denmark: Central Denmark Region
- Municipality: Aarhus Municipality
- District: Aarhus C
- Postal code: 8000

CeresByen (English: CeresCity) is a neighbourhood in Midtbyen, a district of the city of Aarhus, Denmark. It is a mixed residential and commercial area, comprising the site of the former Ceres Brewery operating here from 1856 until November 2008. The outer edges of CeresByen are defined by the streets Thorvaldsensgade, Silkeborgvej, Dollerupvej and Ceres Allé.

The neighbourhood is characterized by densely situated apartment buildings, high-rises, and an open public park along the Aarhus River. Architecturally, the area is modern while taking into account a few remaining and listed historic 19th century buildings of the former Ceres Brewery. The height has been kept relatively low, due to the proximity of nearby open-air museum Den Gamle By, and underground carparks have been constructed to save precious space. The Ceres Panorama residential building, completed in 2016, is one of the tallest in the city.

== History ==
Royal Unibrew closed the Ceres Brewery in 2008 which opened a large tract of land in central Aarhus. The city council elected to rezone the area and re-establish it as a new neighbourhood. The architectural firm Arkitema won the bidding round; construction began in 2013, and by its scheduled completion in 2019, the area will be home to 2000 inhabitants and educational institutions for 5000 students. The first phase was completed in 2015 when the VIA University College campus was completed and in August of the same year the first residents moved into apartment complexes.

== Gallery ==
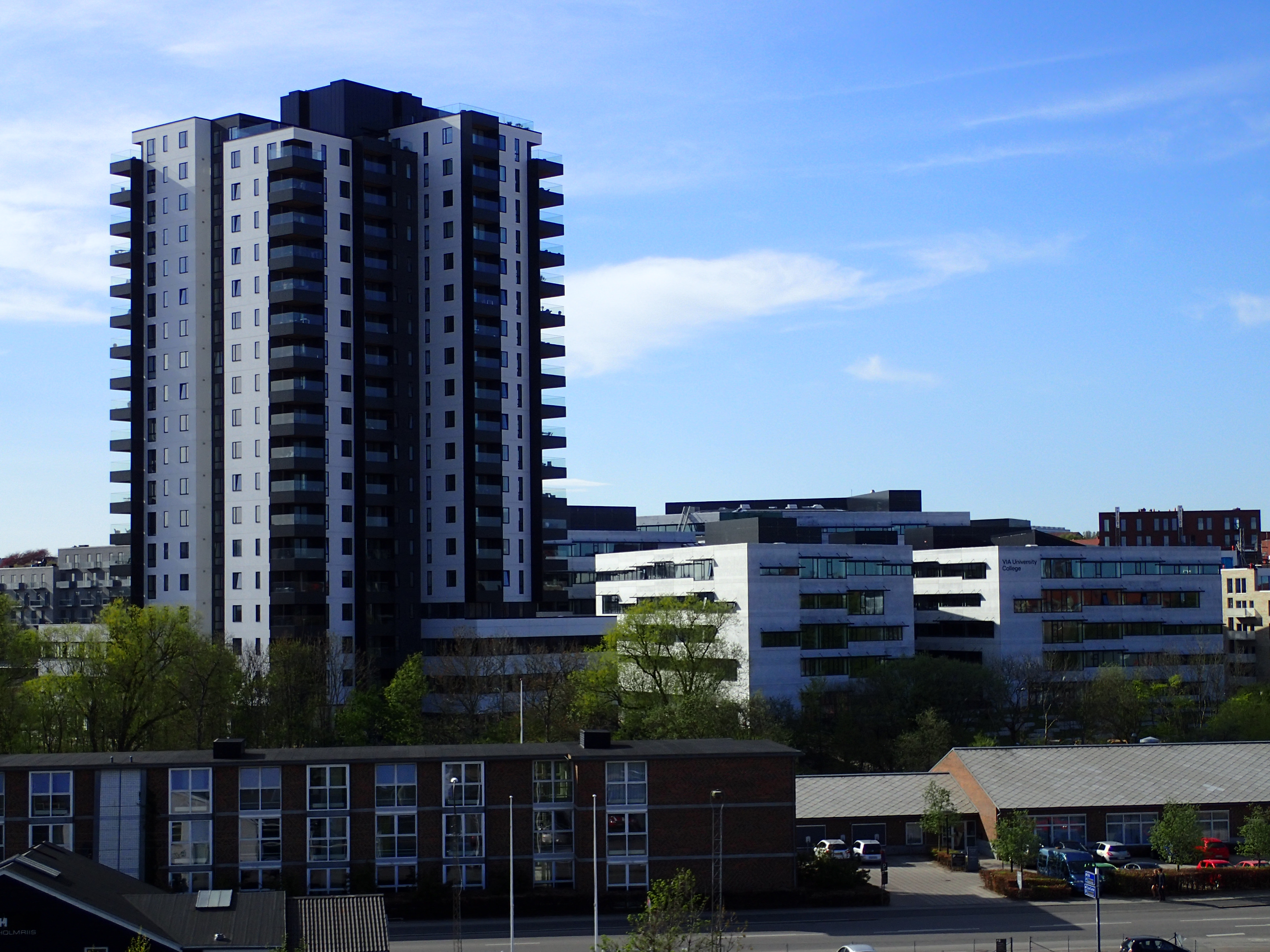
The landmark highrise Ceres Panorama and VIA University College

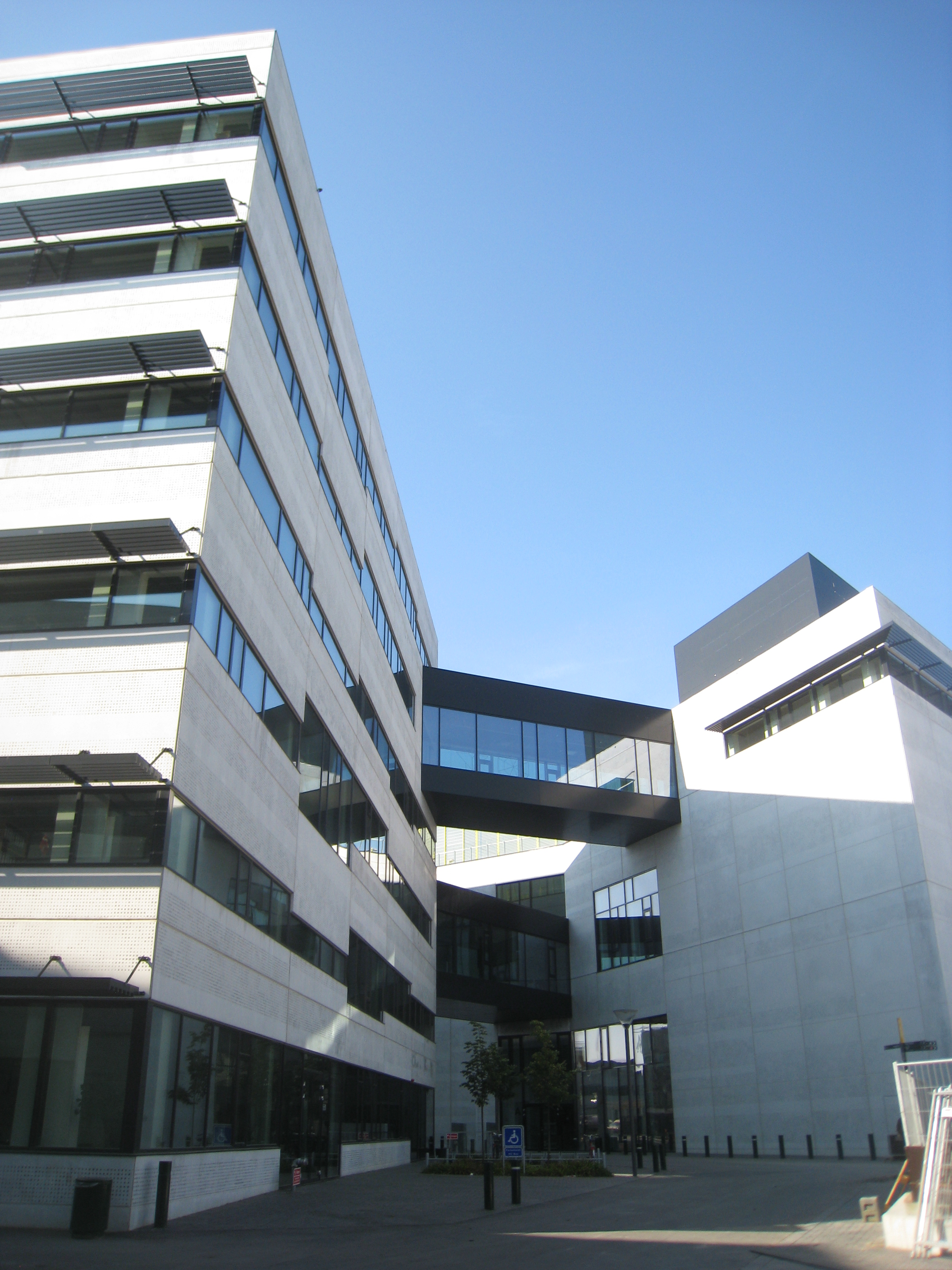
VIA University College complex

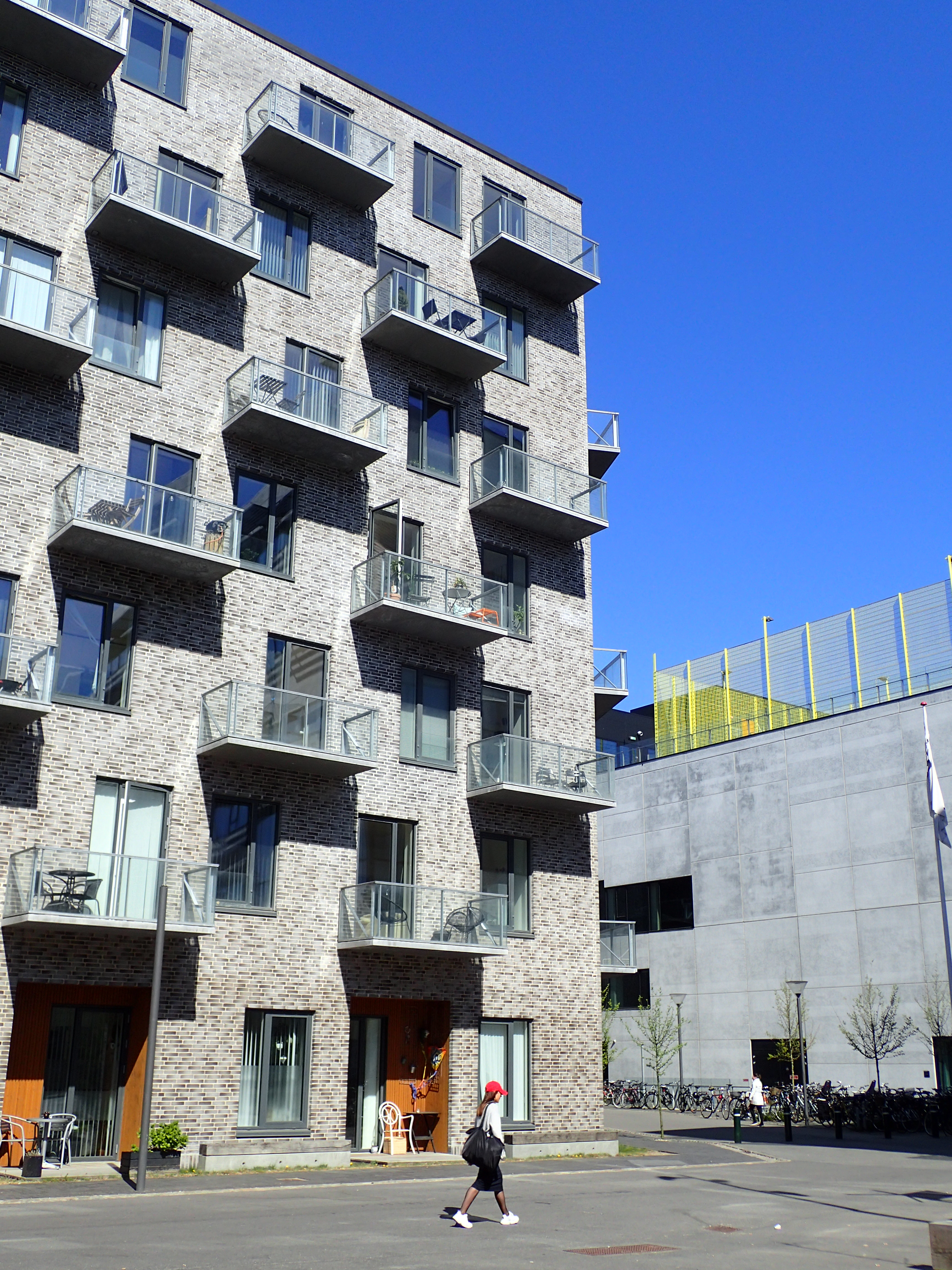
New apartment blocks

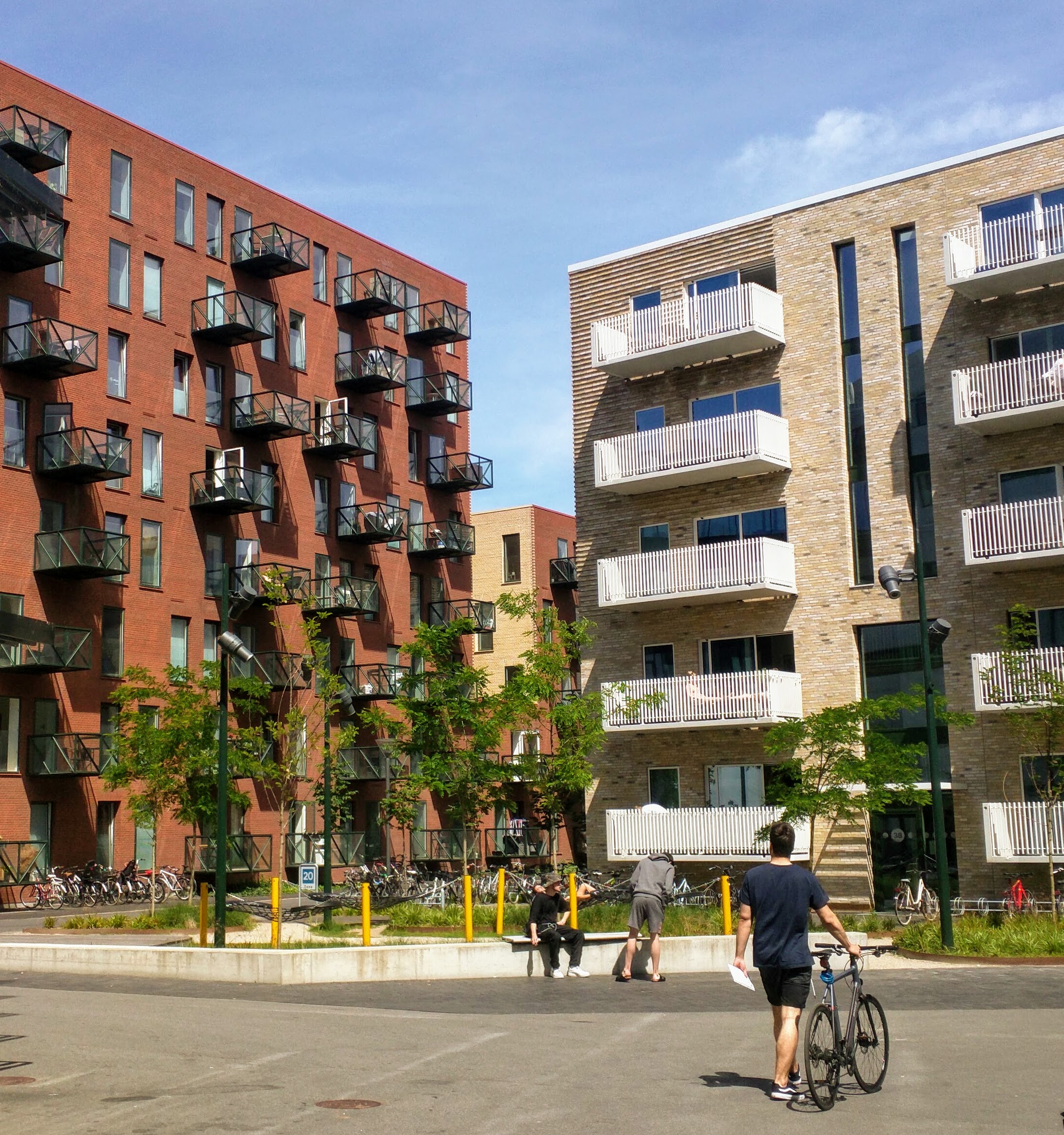
One of several small squares

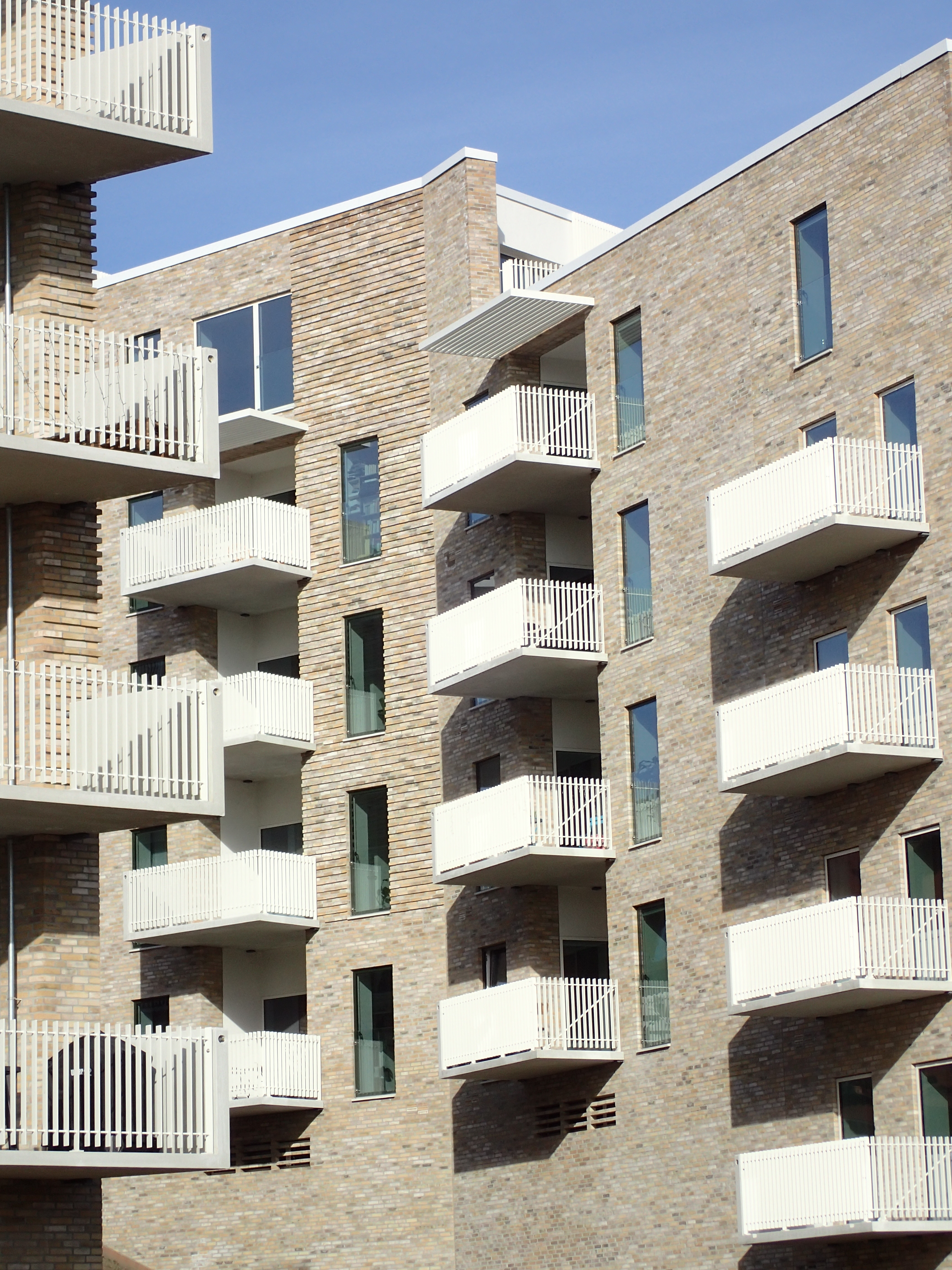
Ceres Park

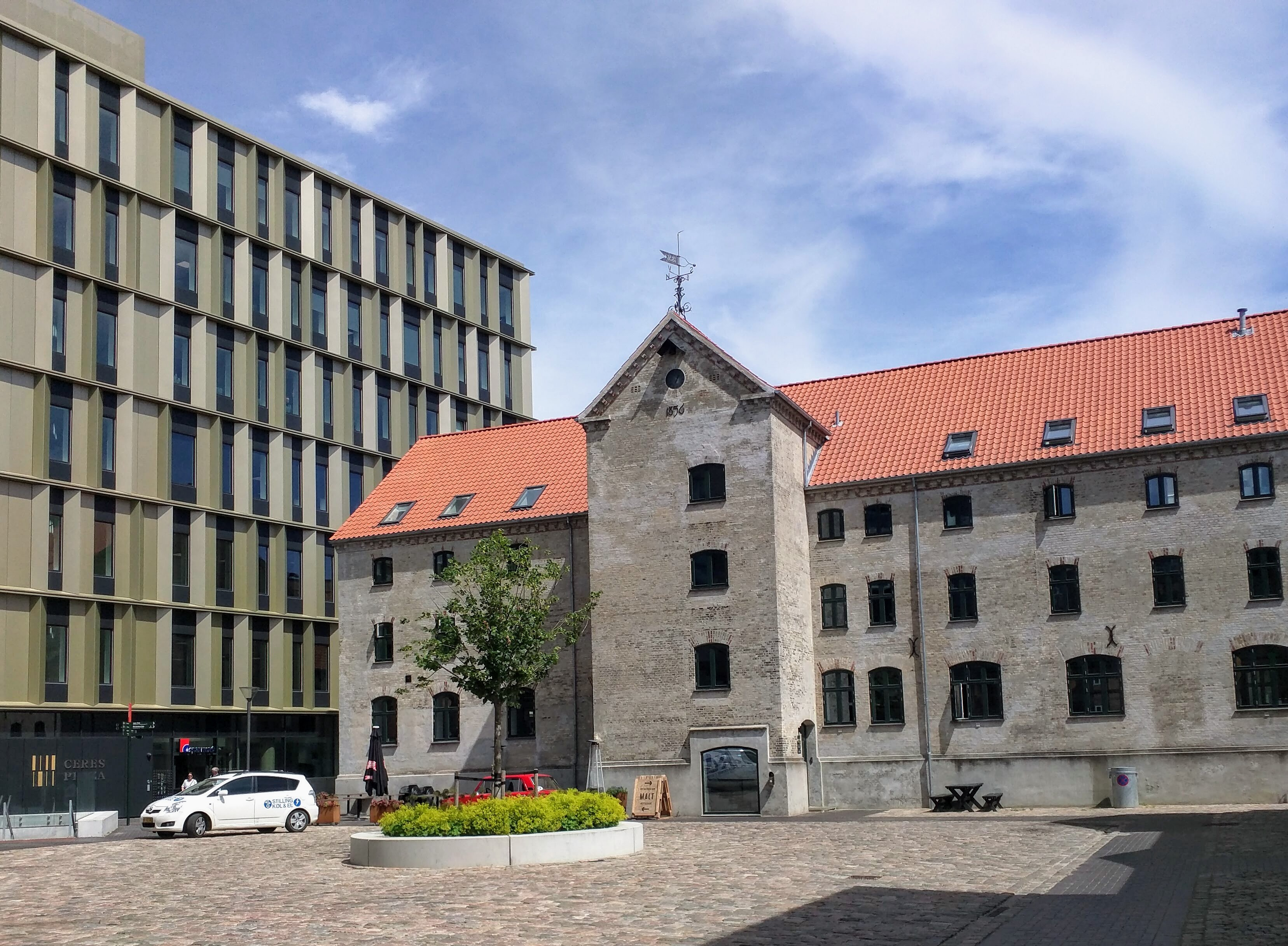
Ceres Plaza, a cobblestone square around former brewery buildings

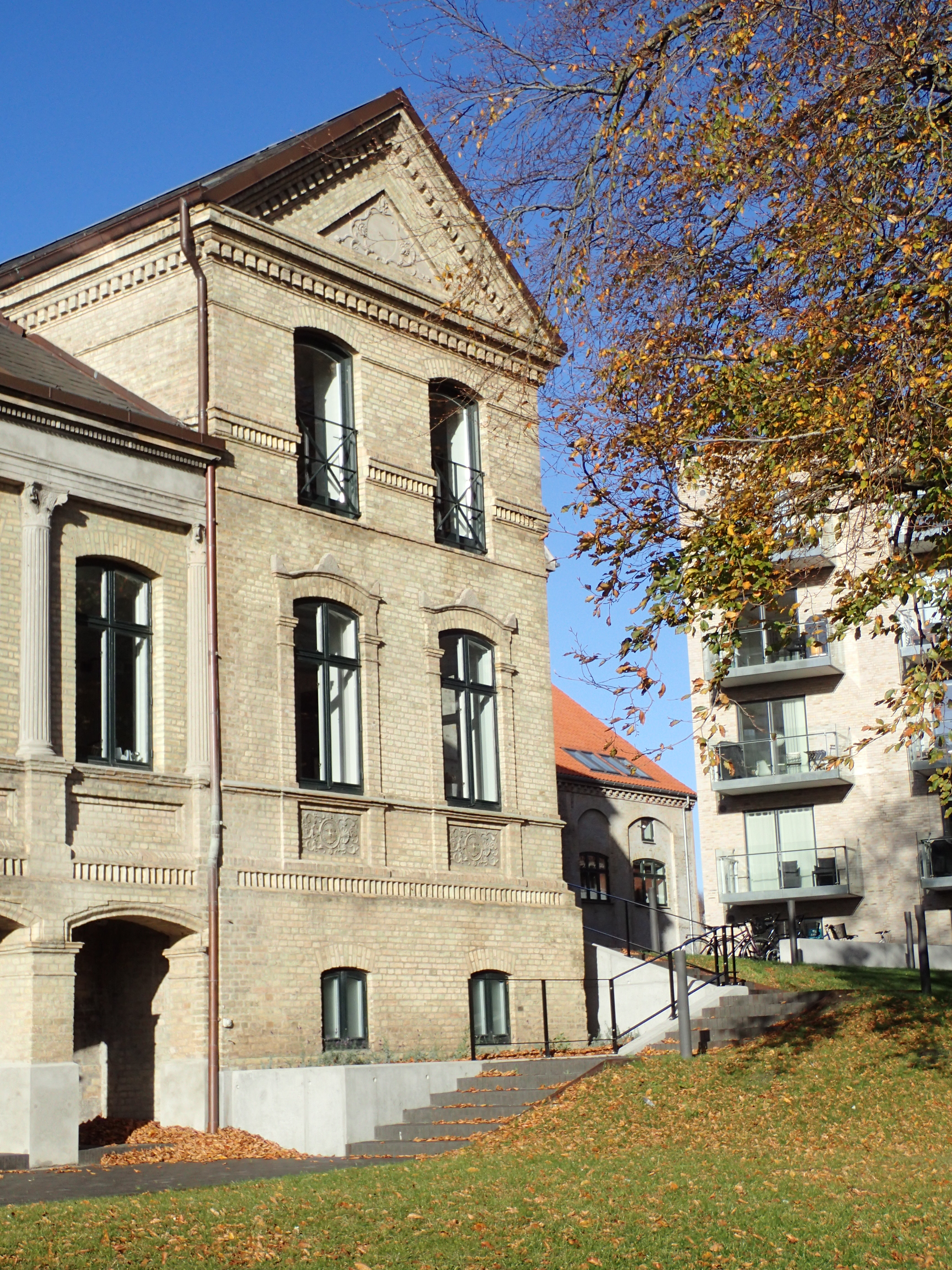
Preserved and listed administrative building from the former Ceres Brewery.

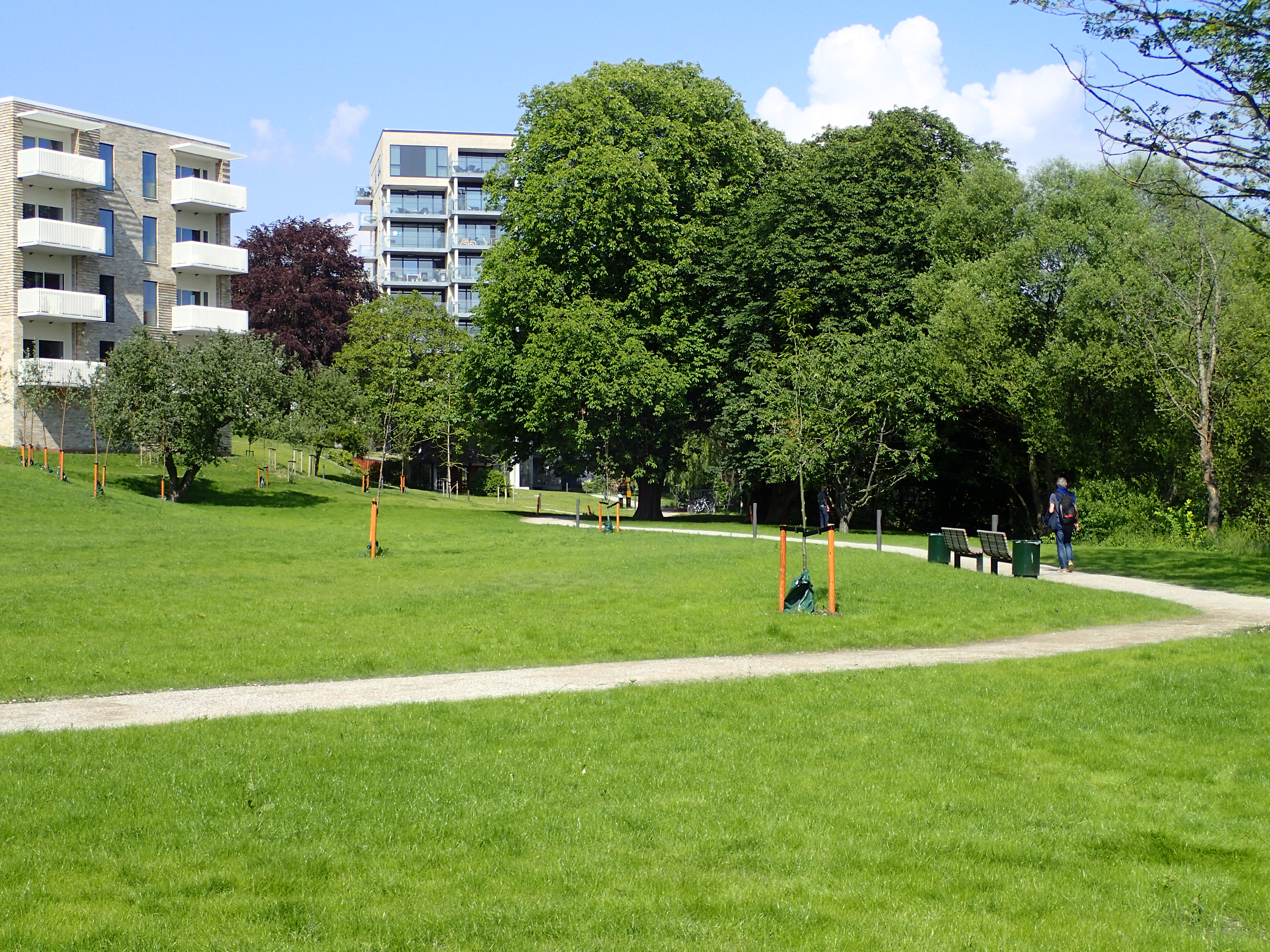
Ceres Garden Park

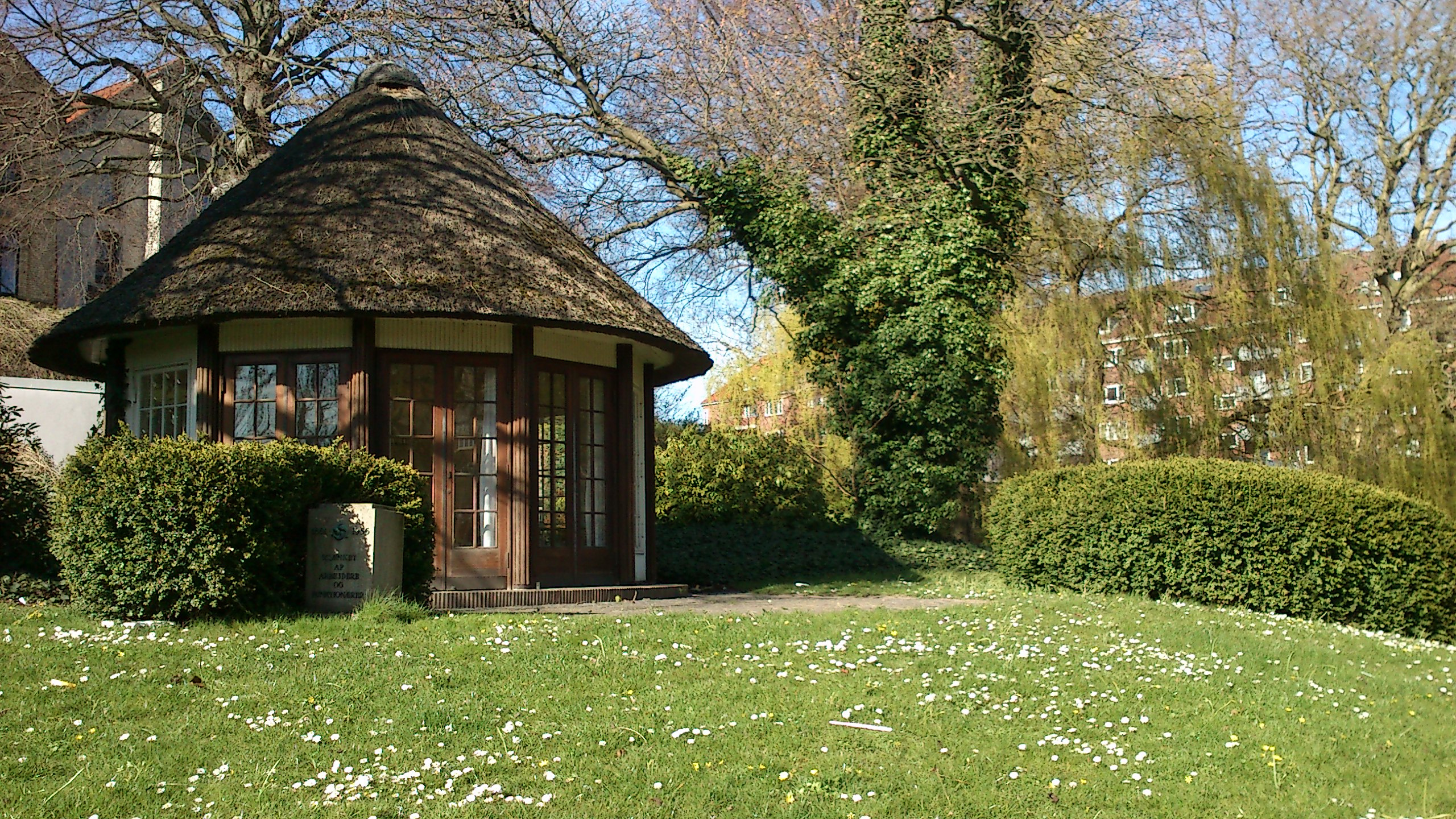
Pavilion

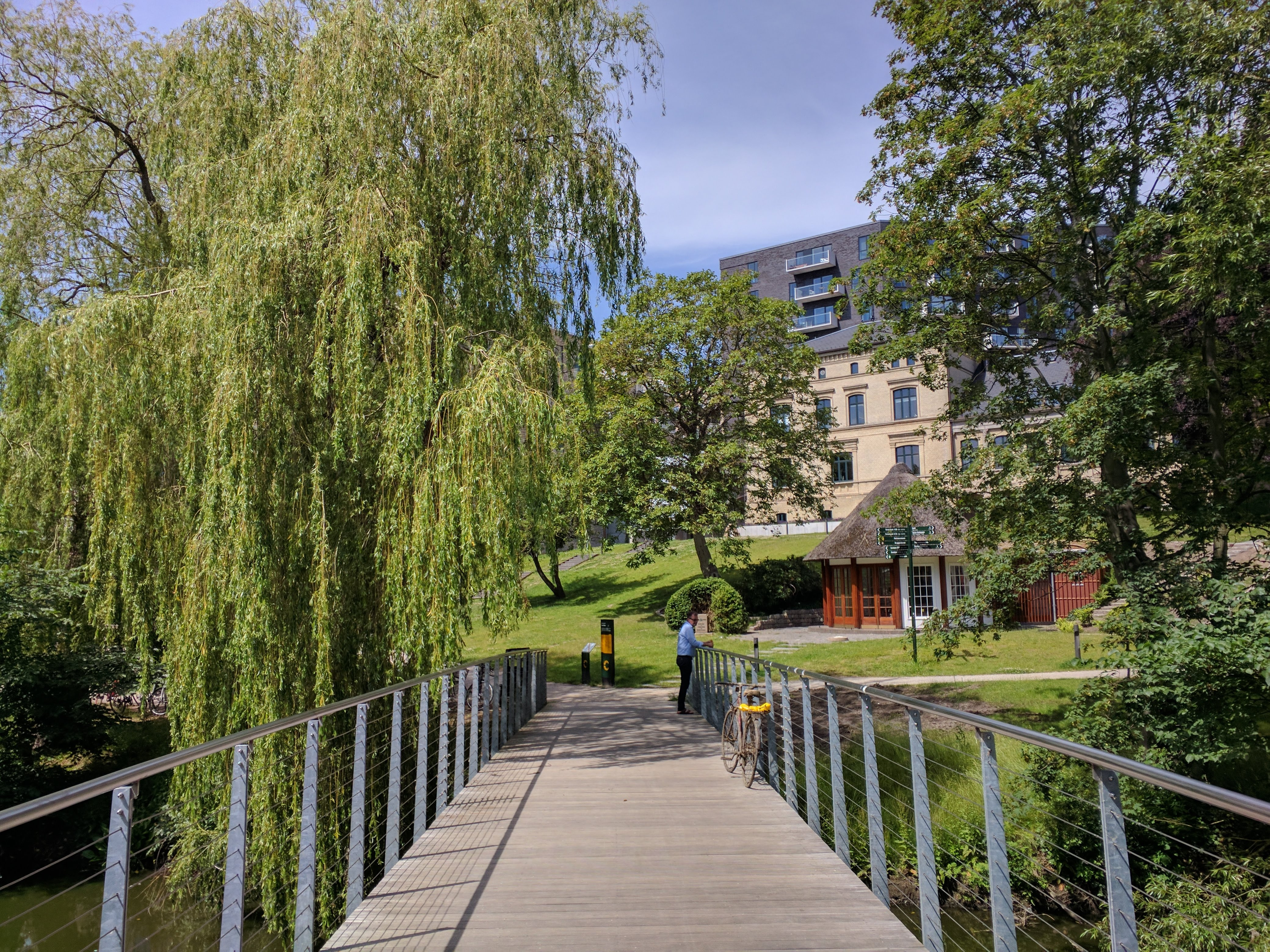
Bridge across Aarhus River
