= Køge Town Hall =

Building in Køge, Denmark

Coordinates: 55°27′24″N 12°10′58″E

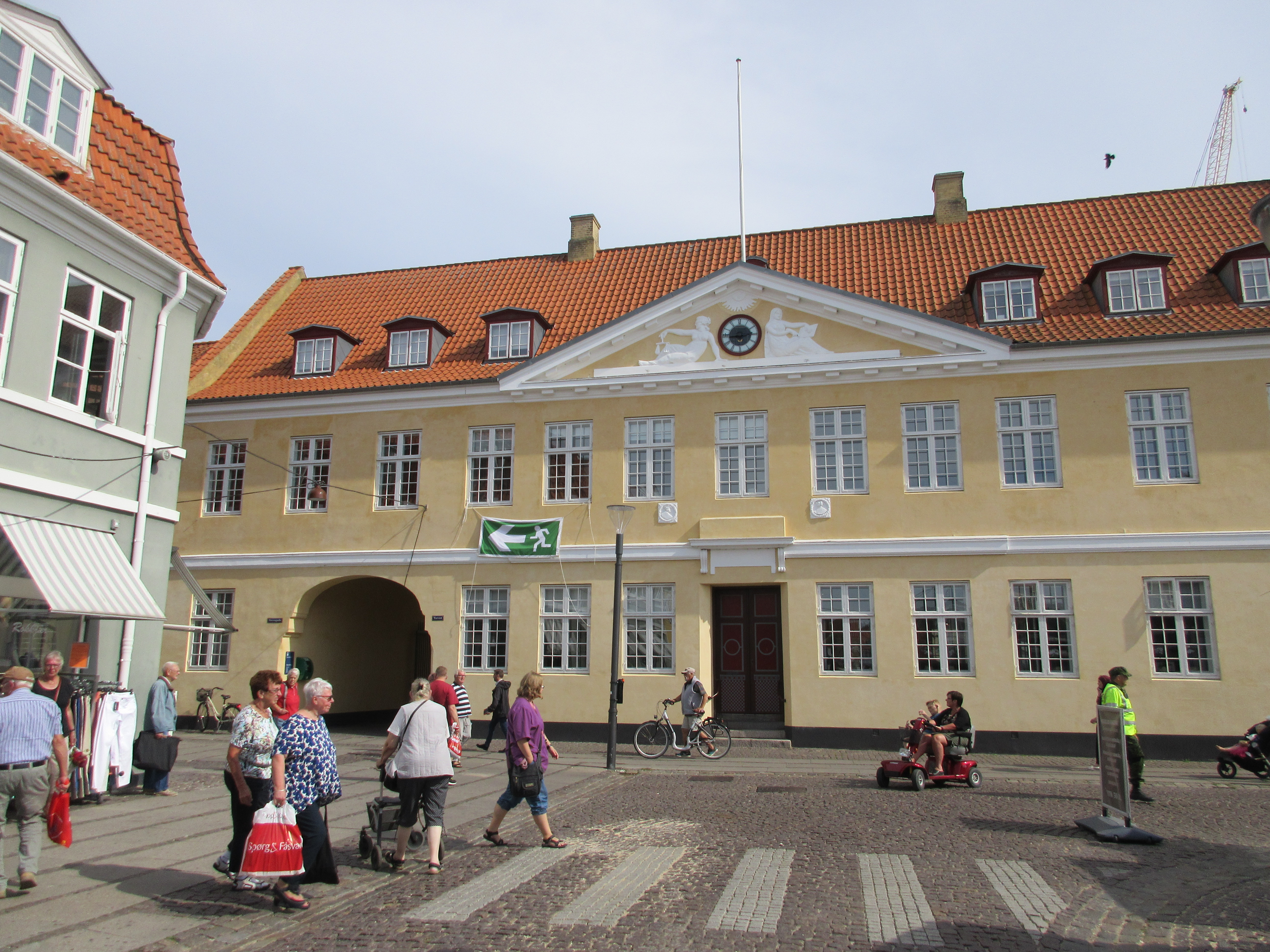
Køge Town Hall.

Køge Town Hall is located in the central town square of Køge, Denmark. The building dates from the 16th century but was adapted in the Neoclassical style in 1903.

== History ==
The town hall was built in about 1552 when the citizens of Køge were granted permission from Christian III to use building materials from the abandoned Greyfriers monastery in Vestergade for the construction of a town hall on condition that it contained granary and custom office. It was built in the Renaissance style and had a frieze with reliefs from Statius von Düren's workshop in Lübeck under the windows on the first floor.

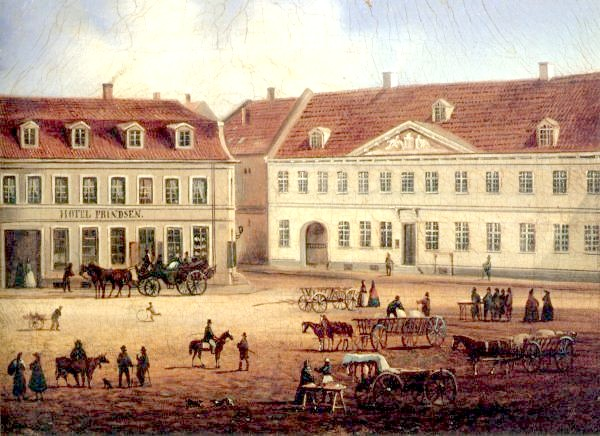
Køge Town Hall seen on a painting from c. 1850

The town hall was extended northwards in 1570. It was completely rebuilt in 1903. It was listed in 1918.

Køge Municipality grew significantly in the 1970 Danish Municipal Reform and an architectural competition was launched for the expansion of the town hall. It was won by Arkitektgruppen Aarhus (now Arkitema Architects) and was their first major project.

== Building ==
The old, Neoclassical town hall building has a simple yellow facade tipped by a triangular pediment. Two of Statius von Düren's terracotta reliefs from the Renaissance town hall flank the main entrance. The building contains the assembly hall and the mayor's office.

The modern extension consists of two long, glazed rear wings flanking a glass-covered alleyway which continues all the way to Køge station. Citizen-oriented functions are concentrated in the ground floors while there is administration on the first floor. The north wing overlooks the garden of Køge Museum to the north. It has an exhibition space in the ground floor.
