= Frederiksholm Brickworks =

Brickyard in Copenhagen, Denmark (1871–1918)

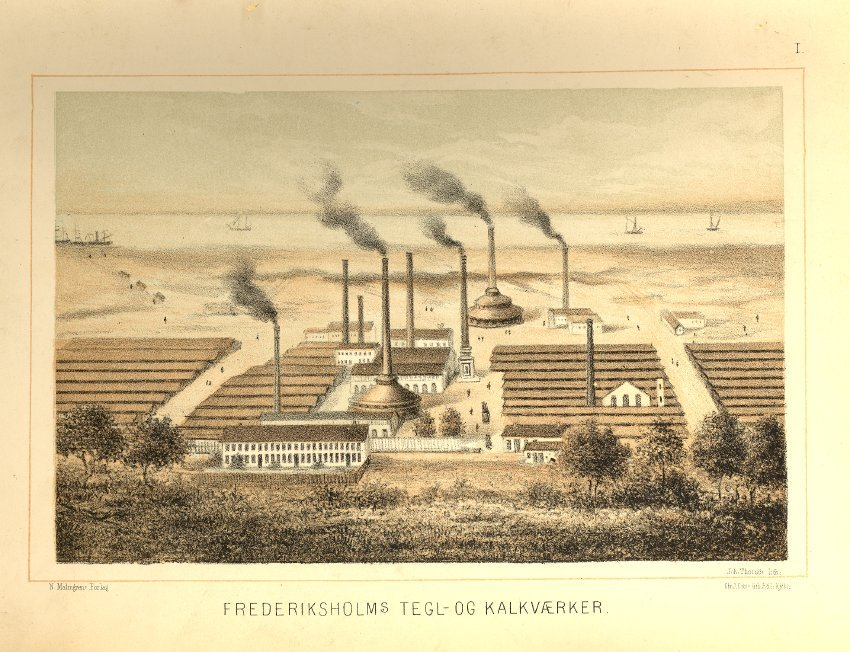
Frederiksholm Brickworks.

Frederiksholm Brickworks (Danish: Frederiksholms Teglværk) was a brickyard in the Kongens Enghave district of Copenhagen, Denmark. It was founded in 1871 and closed in 1918. One of its old clay pits was later converted into the Teglværkshavnen harbour bason. Its former main building was converted into an orphanage. It is the oldest surviving building in the Kongens Enghave district of Copenhagen.

== History ==
In 1795, Kongens Enghave was divided into 22 estates and sold to wealthy citizens from Copenhagen. Frederiksholm was the largest of these properties.

In the late 1860s, Frederiksholm was acquired by the brothers Vilhelm and Julius Køhler. They had made a fortune on the construction of apartment buildings in the new districts outside Copenhagen's old fortifications (Vesterbro, Nørrebro, Østerbro). This had made them aware of the economic potential in having a large brickworks close to Copenhagen.

The brickyard opened in 1871. In 1873, it was converted into a limited company (aktieselskab). Denmark's largest ring oven was constructed in 1874. In 1875, Julius Køhler left the company to focus on his work as a master mason and developer. Vilhelm Køhler served as managing director of the company until his death in 1902. In the years around 1900, Frederiksholm Brickworks employed around 500 workers. The estate covered around 100 hectares of land of which around 20 hectares was reclaimed land along Kalvebod Beach. The large building complex comprised housing for around 150 workers and stabling for 80 horses. Many of the workers were seasonal workers from Sweden. The worker's housing was therefore known as Svenskerlejren ((The Swedish Camp). Bilhelm Høhler resided in Frederiksholm's old main building during the summer months.

After Vilhelm køhler's death in 1902, he was succeeded by his son Oscar Jøhler. The brickworks closed in 1918. The land was subsequently redeveloped. The olf main building was converted into an orphanage.
