= Arkitema Architects =

Architectural Firm

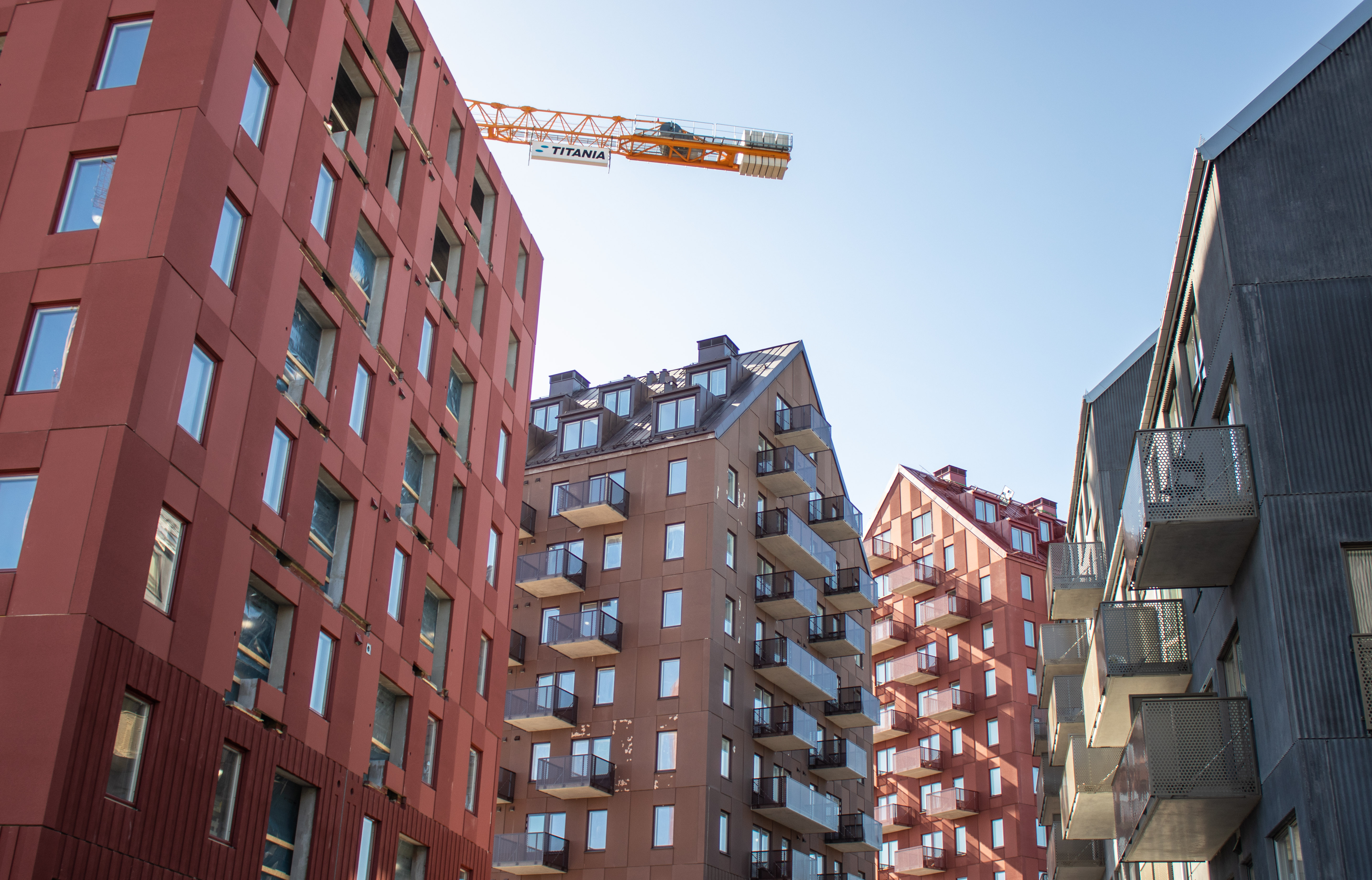
- Residential project (Tingstorvet in Alby, Sweden 2018)

Practice information
- Founded: 1969
- Location: Aarhus, Denmark

Significant works and honors
- Buildings: Kobbertårnet, Bellahøj Swim Stadion, Sluseholmen Canal District, Mikado House, VIA University College Campus Aarhus C

Arkitema Architects is a Danish architectural firm headquartered in Aarhus, with branch offices in Copenhagen, Malmö, Stockholm and Oslo. Arkitema Architects was founded in 1969 in Aarhus, and nowadays has about 400 employees with its main activity in Scandinavia.

Arkitema Architects is owned by Danish engineering company Cowi.

== History ==
The firm was founded in 1969 as Arkitektgruppen Aarhus by five students from the Aarhus School of Architecture after they won a competition for the design of an expansion of Køge Town Hall. They were Helge Tindal, Ole Nielsson, Michael Harrebæk, Eriling Stadager and Lars Due. Today Arkitema Architects has 14 partners.

In 1990, Arkitektgruppen Aarhus won the Nykredit Architecture Prize. In 2003 the firm changed its name to Arkitema Architects and in 2004 it merged with AA Arkitekter to be able to expand internationally.

In 2011, as part of its continued efforts to grow on the Scandinavian market, Arkitema Architects acquired majority ownership of Swedish Dot Arkitekter. In 2015 Arkitema Architects opened an office in Oslo, Norway.

In late 2018, Danish consultant and engineering company Cowi bought Arkitema Architects.

== Partnership ==
Arkitema Architects includes an urban design department (Arkitema Urban Design) and a consulting department (Arkitema Consulting). The company has teamed up with skilled people from several disciplines, including the fields of engineering, sustainability, management and construction.

As of 1 January 2018, Arkitema had the following partners:

Senior partners: Jørgen Bach, Peter Hartmann Berg, Wilhelm Berner-Nielsen, Thomas Birkkjær, Thomas Carstens, Glenn Elmbæk, Per Fischer, Ola Göransson, Dorthe Keis, Kim Risager, Poul Schülein, Anne Guri Grimsby og Aasmund Bjørnstad.

Partners: Anders Halgren, Kristina Peters, Mette Julie Skibsholt, Håkan Sandhagen og Søren Haugsted.

Associated partners: Mette Baarup, Eric Engström, Viktor Ahnfelt, Emil Carstens, Birgitte Gade Ernst, Carsten Jensen, Heidi Hjort Thuesen.

== Selected projects ==
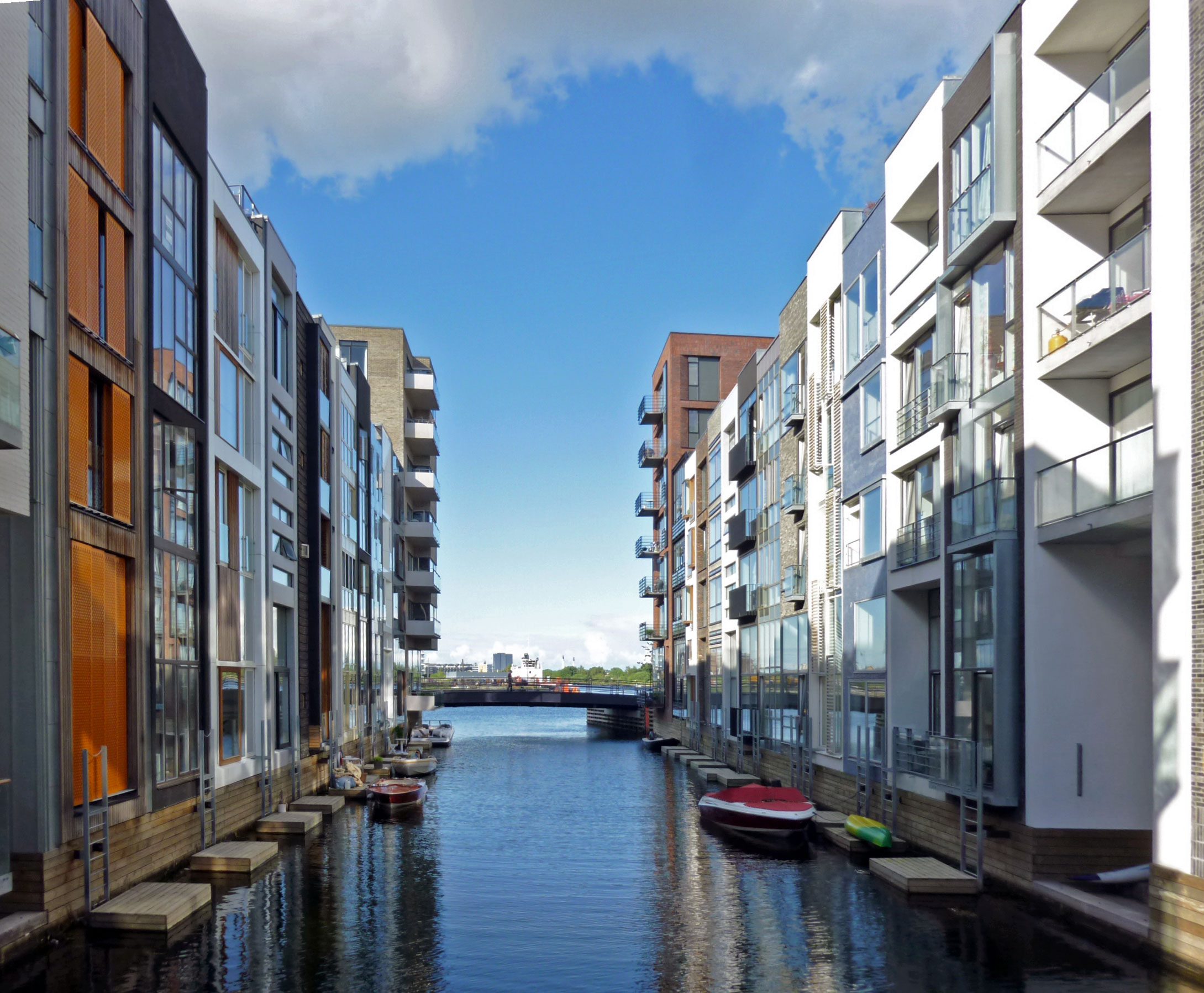
Sluseholmen canal buildings, Copenhagen (2009)

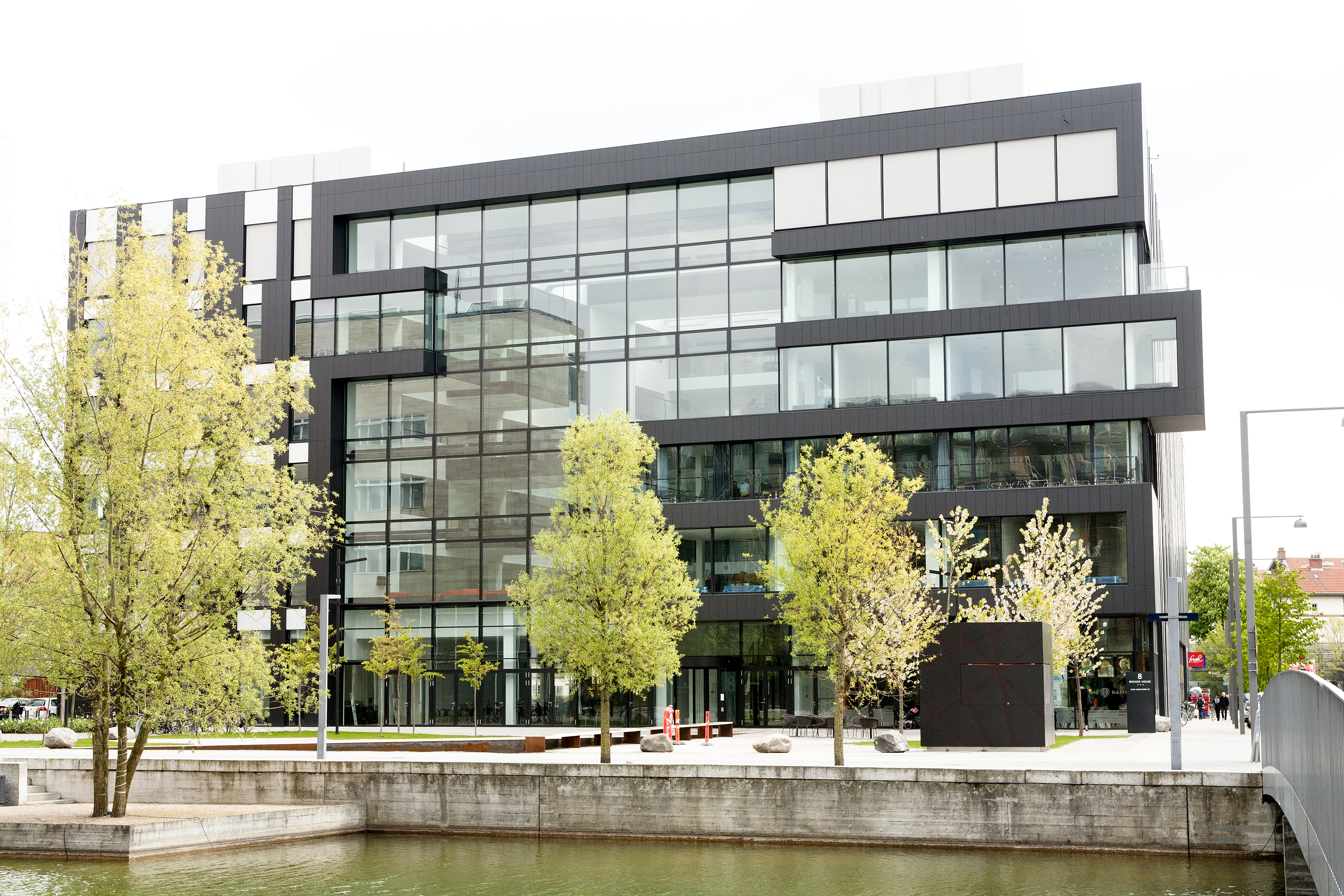
Mikado House in Ørestad, Copenhagen (2010)

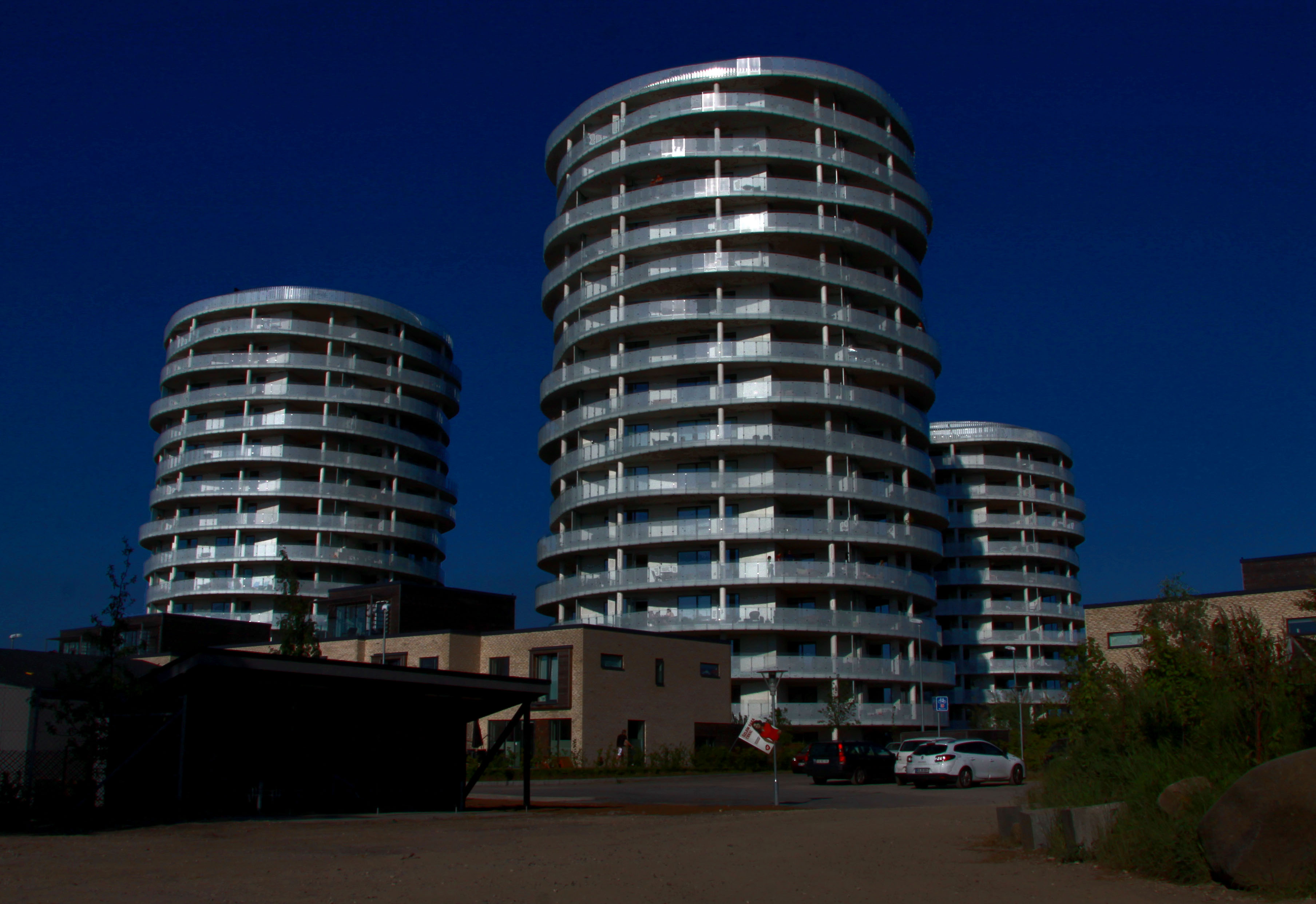
Tårnene, Copenhagen (2014)

Arkitema has designed a broad range of architectural projects, from minor expansions and renovations to large redevelopment, infrastructural, residential and urban design projects. Some of the most notable and representative projects from Arkitema includes the following:

=== Completed ===
- Køge Town Hall, Køge (1976) - Expansion of an old listed building
- Vamdrup Rådhus, Vamdrup (1981) - Town Hall
- Håndværkerparken, Aarhus (1981) - Postmodern lowrise residential quarter
- Police station, Helsingør (1991)
- Arosgården, Aarhus (1993) - Postmodern office building
- Fåborg Swim Stadium, Fåborg (1996)
- Enhjørningens Gård, Christianshavn, Copenhagen (2001) - Apartment block
- Hellerup School, Hellerup (2002) - Public school
- Danish Crown, Horsens (2002) - Slaugtherhouse
- Kobbertårnet, Amerika Plads, Copenhagen (2004) - High-rise office building
- Mary's, Vejle (2008) - Shopping arcade (closed)
- Bellahøj Swim Stadium, Copenhagen (2009) - Renovation and landscape designs
- Sluseholmen Canal District, Copenhagen (2009) - Apartment blocks (redevelopment)
- Mikado House, Ørestad, Copenhagen (2010) - Mixed use (offices and shops)
- CeresByen, Aarhus (2013) - Urban design of a new neighbourhood
- Aarhus City Tower, Aarhus (2014) - High-rise hotel
- VIA University College Campus Aarhus C, Aarhus (2015) - Educational institution

=== In progress ===
- Østfold Hospital, Østfold, Norway (u/c)
- Thor highrise, Randers, Denmark
- Bolig+, Aalborg, Denmark
- Vibeeng School, Faxe, Denmark
- Bindesbøll Byen, Aarhus, Denmark (from 2019) - New city borough (redevelopment)
- Oksenøya, Oslo, Norway (from 2019) - New city borough
