= Aarhus City Tower =

Coordinates: 56°09′27.2″N 10°11′34.3″E

- Aarhus City Tower
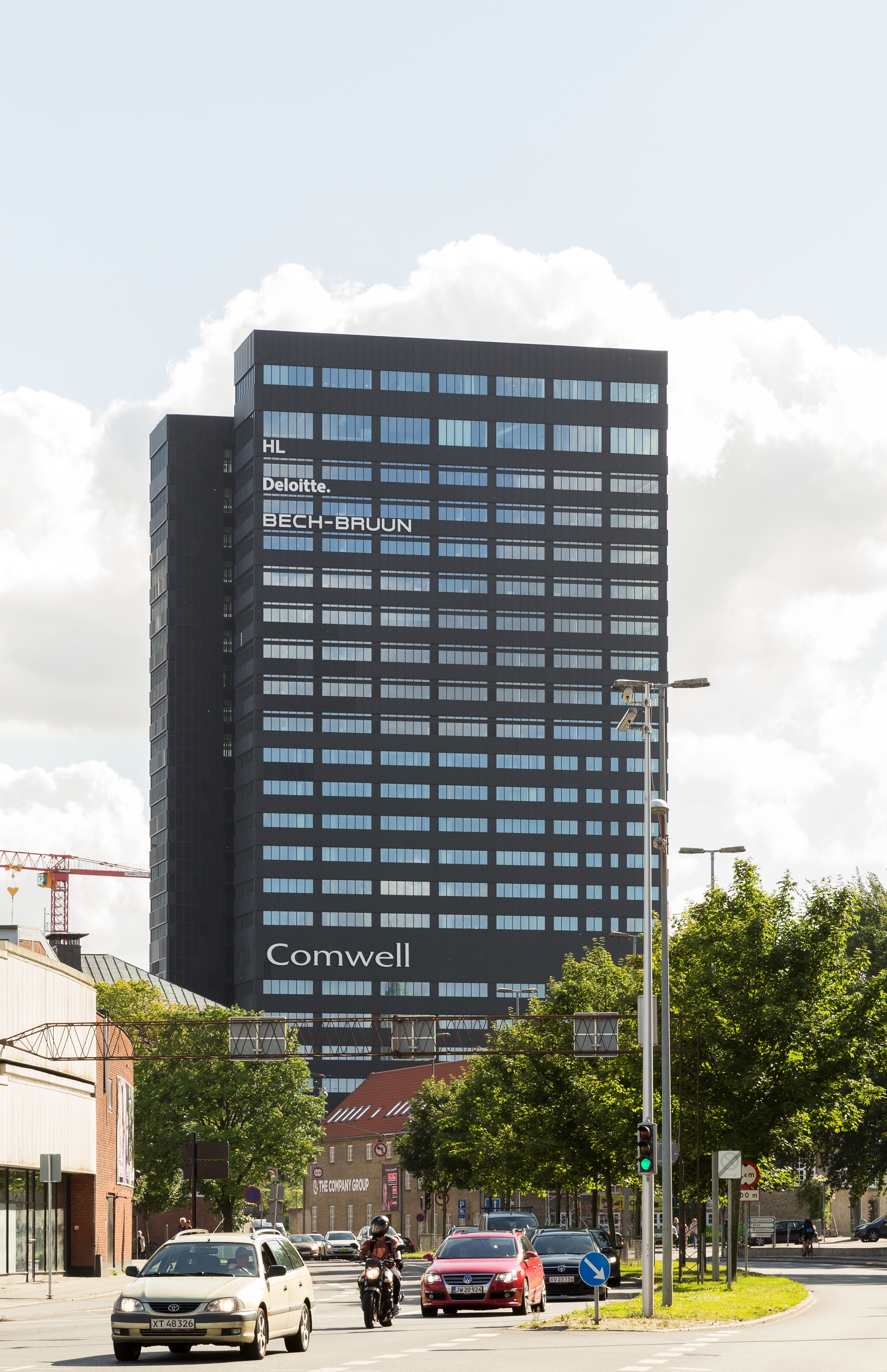
- Aarhus City Tower
- Interactive map of the Aarhus City Tower area

General information
- Location: Aarhus, Denmark
- Completed: 2014

Height
- Height: 94 meters

Design and construction
- Architect: arkitema

Aarhus City Tower (formerly HL Huset) is a building on Værkmestergade in Aarhus, Denmark, and it is one of the tallest buildings in both the city and Denmark at large. At 94 meters it is the second tallest building in Aarhus after Aarhus Cathedral and, as of 2016, it is the fourth tallest building in Denmark. Aarhus City Tower is used as a Comwell hotel, offices and for conferences. Aarhus City Tower was built by the Danish businessman Hans Lorenzen through the contractor KPC with Rambøll as the engineer and Arkitema as the architect. The building is 25.000m² spread across 25 floors with an additional 13.000m² subterranean parking garage. It is the tallest building constructed in Aarhus since the 1930s when the cathedral got its 96-meter-tall (315 ft) spire. The other floors has been rented by Bech-Bruun, Deloitte and the Danish hotel chain Comwell. The Comwell hotel has 240 rooms and conference facilities for 1000 people.

== Architecture ==
Construction was completed in the summer of 2014. It is shaped as two towers connected by a transparent, glass covered space. The north tower is shifted relative to the south tower and is one floor taller. The project was financed by the businessman Hans Lorenzen who invested 600 million Danish krone in it and has taken the top floor of the north tower as his personal home.

== Gallery ==
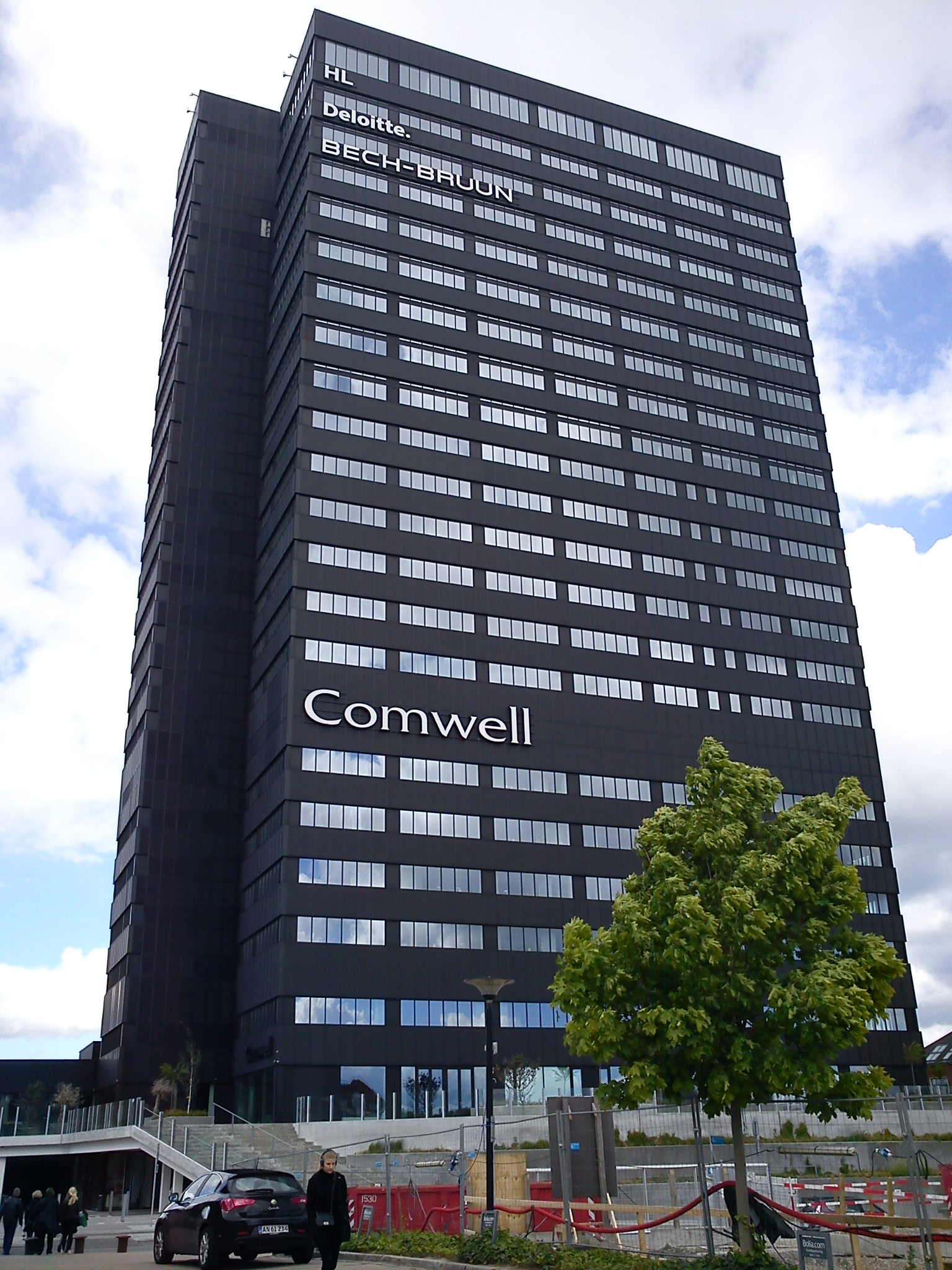

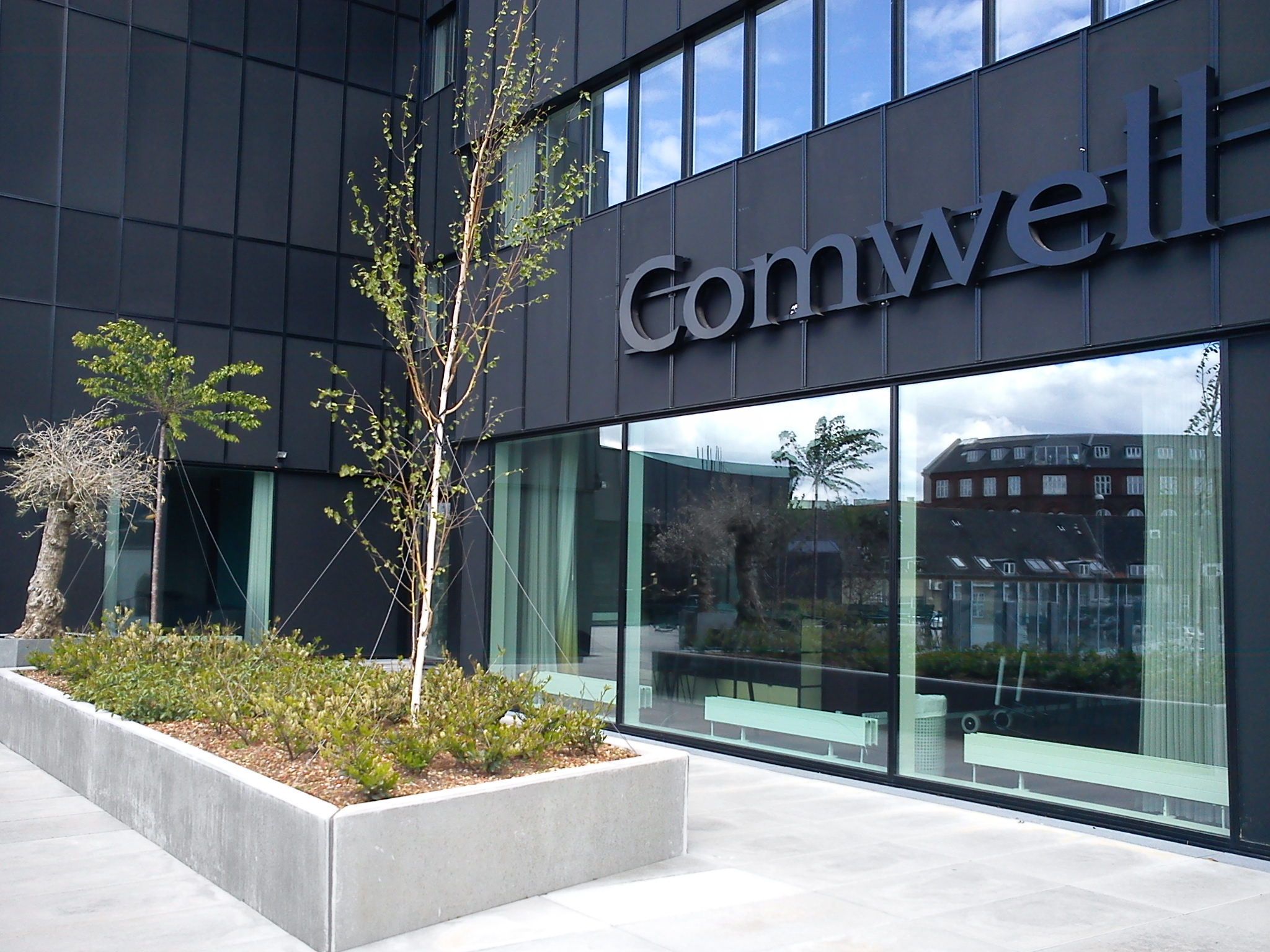

== See also ==
- Architecture of Aarhus
- List of tallest buildings in Denmark
