= Bech-Bruun =

Danish law firm

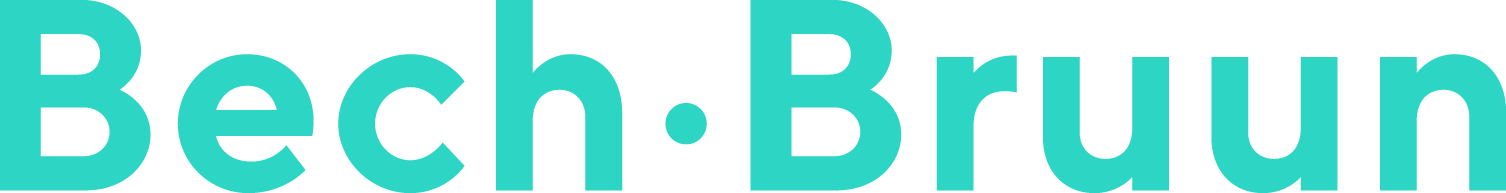
- Type: Partnership
- Industry: Law
- Founded: 2001
- Headquarters: Copenhagen, Denmark
- Key people: Claus Aagaard Nielsen (Chair of the Board); Steen Rode (Chief Executive Partner)
- Revenue: € 125.36 million
- Number of employees: ≈ 595 (2023)
- Website: bechbruun.com

Bech-Bruun is a Danish law firm with offices in Copenhagen and Aarhus. As of 2023, the firm has 64 partners and almost 600 employees. It is described as one of the "Big Four" in the Danish market for legal services.

== History ==
Bech-Bruun traces its history back to 1872 when it was established as "Bech-Bruun I/S" but in 2001, after numerous mergers, it changed its name to "Bech-Bruun Dragsted Advokatfirma I/S", finally becoming "Bech-Bruun" in 2005.

In 2012, the company merged with Philip Advokatfirma, cementing its position as Denmark's second-largest law firm. The firm deals mainly with business clients.

After having won a public tender in February 2017, Bech-Bruun submitted a study report in the so-called dividend tax case, concerning false claims for Danish dividend withholding tax refunds, which is believed to have cost the Danish state 12.7 billion DKK. In November 2018, in the context of a police investigation, it was revealed that two of Bech-Bruun’s partners in 2014-2015 had advised one of the largest culprits in the dividend tax case, the North Channel Bank. Bech-Bruun was subsequently sued by the Danish tax authorities in tort and on 20 November 2023 the Danish Supreme Court found in favour of the tax authorities and ordered Bech-Bruun to pay a total amount of approx. 1/2 billion DKK (including interest) in damages. In a press release issued by Bech-Bruun on 20 November 2023, the firm stated that the Supreme Court's ruling came as a surprise, but that the damages would be covered by the firm's professional indemnity insurance.

== Location ==
Bech-Bruun has its head office at Langelinie in Copenhagen. The Aarhus office is located at Vor Frue Kirkeplads but will move into a new high-rise in 2014. In 2024, Bech-Bruun's Copenhagen branch will move to a newly built domicile in the new neighbourhood of Nordø.

== Assessment ==
In the Legal 500 listing, Bech-Bruun is rated as a first tier firm in Denmark in the areas of employment, energy, environment, information technology, insolvency, media and entertainment, mergers and acquisitions, real estate and construction, shipping and transport, and telecommunications. The IFLR1000 listing of the world's leading financial law firms rates Bech-Bruun Tier 1 for restructuring and insolvency and Tier 2 for banking and finance, and mergers and acquisitions.
