= Sjoerd Soeters =

Dutch architect (born 1947)

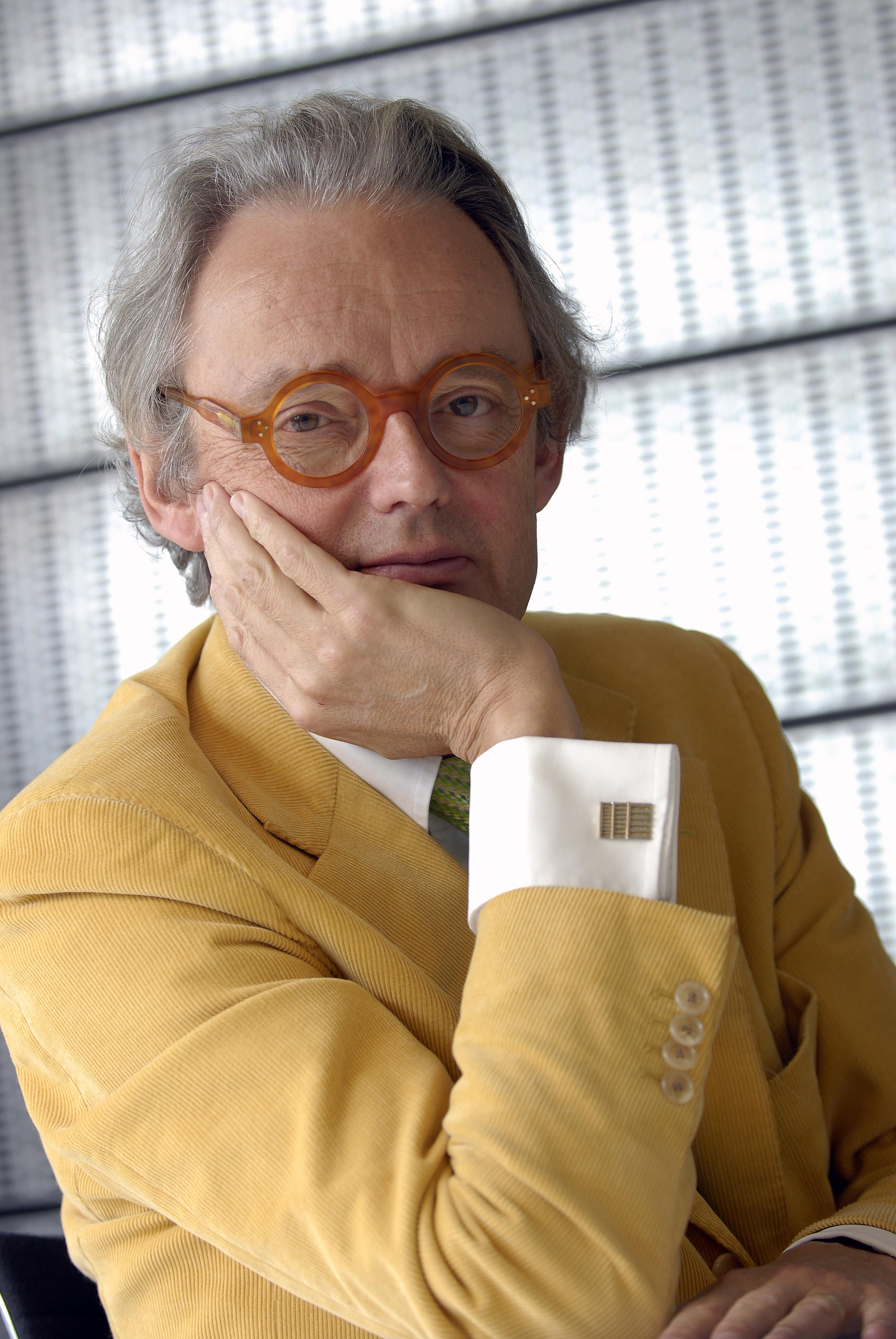
Sjoerd Soeters

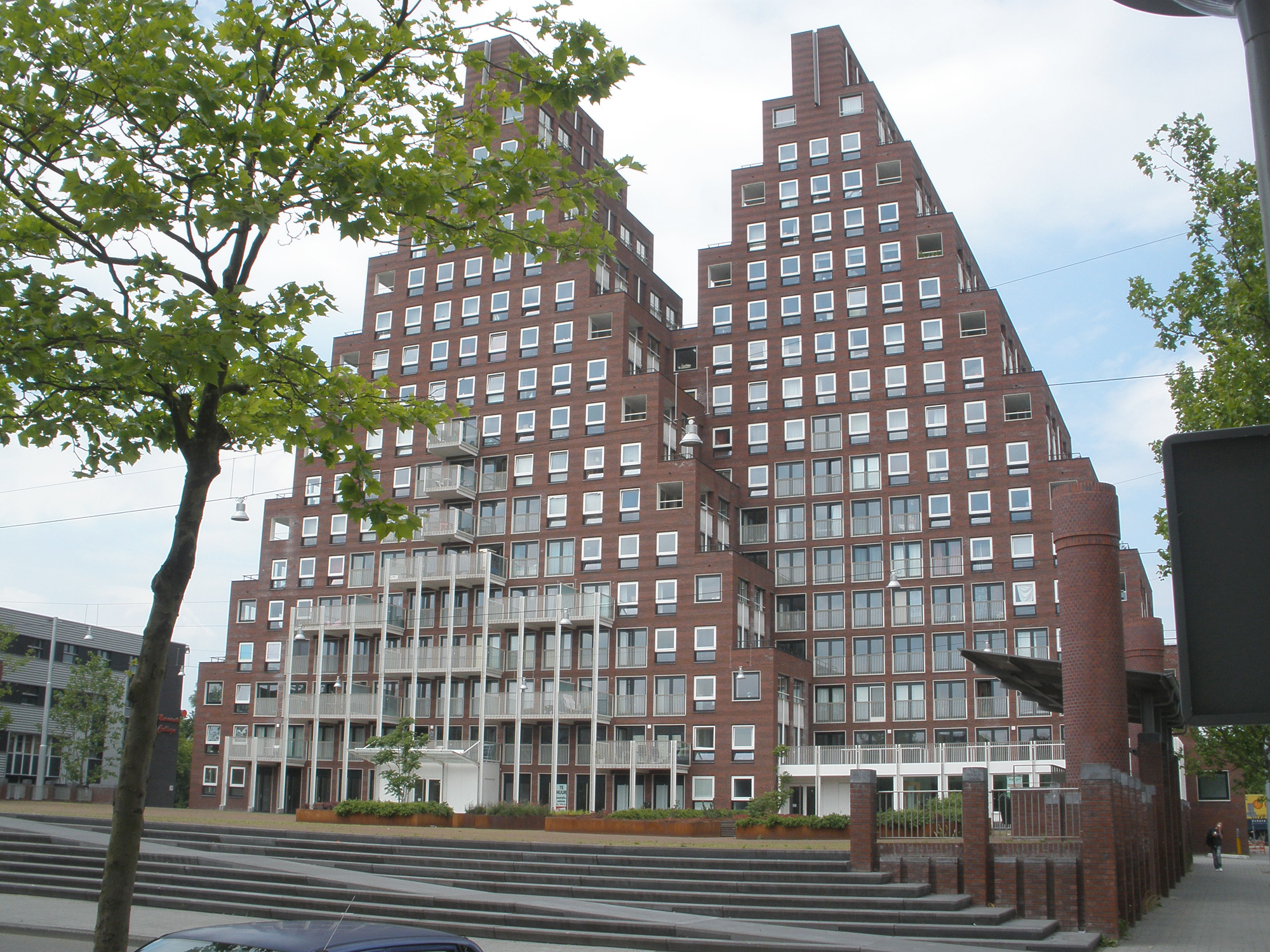
The Pyramids complex in Amsterdam designed by Sjoerd Soeters

Sjoerd Soeters (born 2 August 1947 in Nes) is a well-known postmodern Dutch architect. Among other projects, he is known for his work on Amsterdam's Java Island and Houthaven, Copenhagen's Sluseholmen, the apartment complex "The Pyramids" (De Piramides), and for the redevelopment of Zaandam.
