= Valby Langgade =

Street in Copenhagen, Denmark

Coordinates: 55.6659°N 12.5087°E

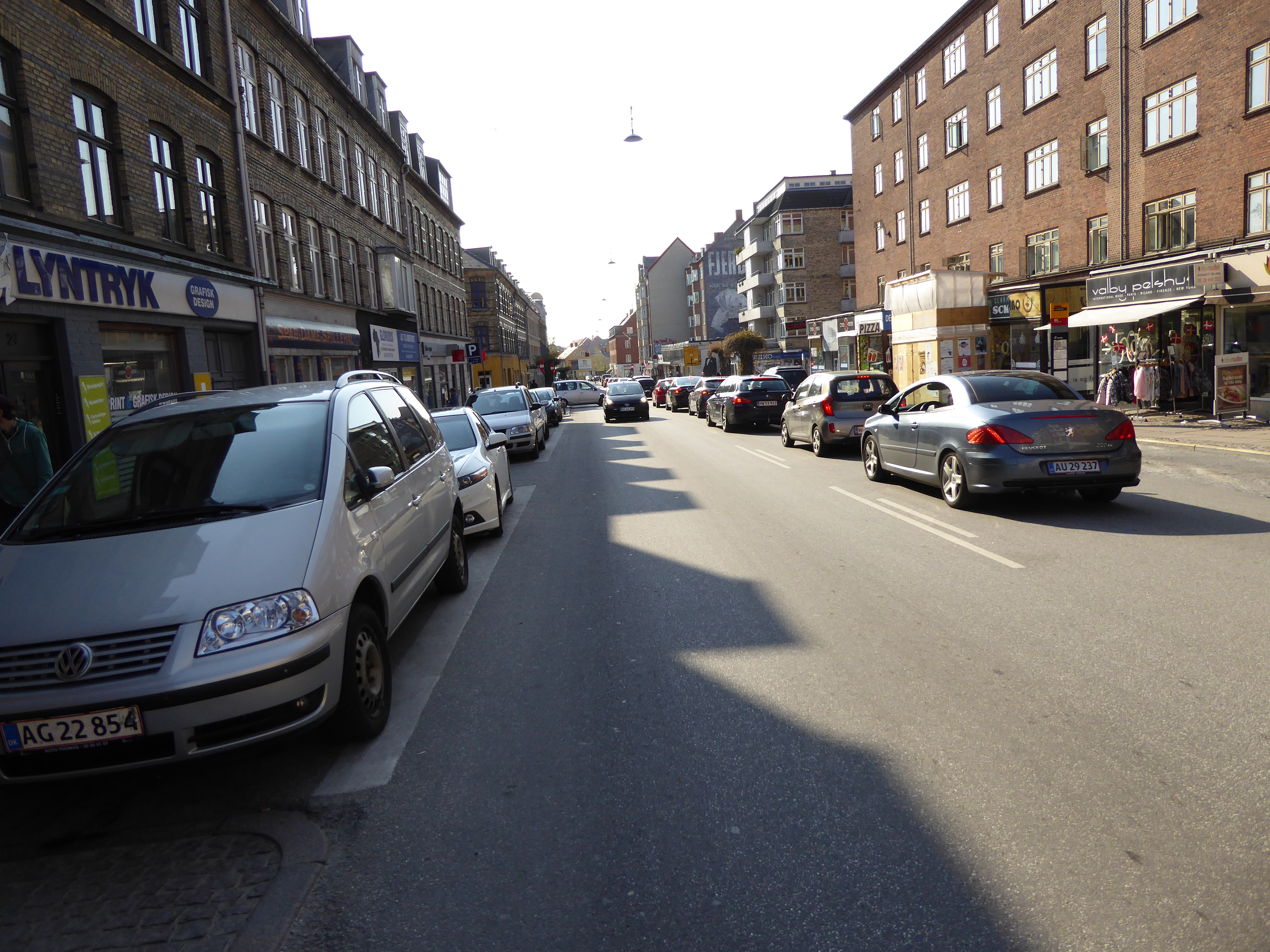
Bülowsvej 22: One of the old villas located on the east side of the street

Valby Langgade is one of the main streets of the Valby district of Copenhagen, Denmark. The c. 3.2 km long street runs from the southern end of Pile Allé and the Carlsberg neighbourhood in the east to Roskildevej at Damhus Lake in the west. The square and side street Valby Tingsted was the centre of the original village of Valby.

== History ==
The street is part of the old main road between Copenhagen's Western Gate and Roskilde. The road made a detour by way of the village of Valby to avoid the steepest part of Valby Hill. Today's side street Skolegade was the first part of the road to Køge. Frederiksberg Palace was built on the top of the hill in the 1700s. The gardens of the new royal summer retreat reached all the way to Valby Langgade.

The new and more direct Roskilde Road which went through the royal gardens of Frederiksberg Palace, bypassing Valby, was inaugurated in 1776.

In the 1770s, Valby was transformed from village to suburb and the road changed even more after Valby became part of Copenhagen Municipality in 1901. Apartment buildings with five and six stories sprang up, and the Norden porcelain factory was established on the south side of the road a little to the west of the old village centre in 1916. It later became part of Bing & Grøndahl.

== Neighborhoods and developments ==
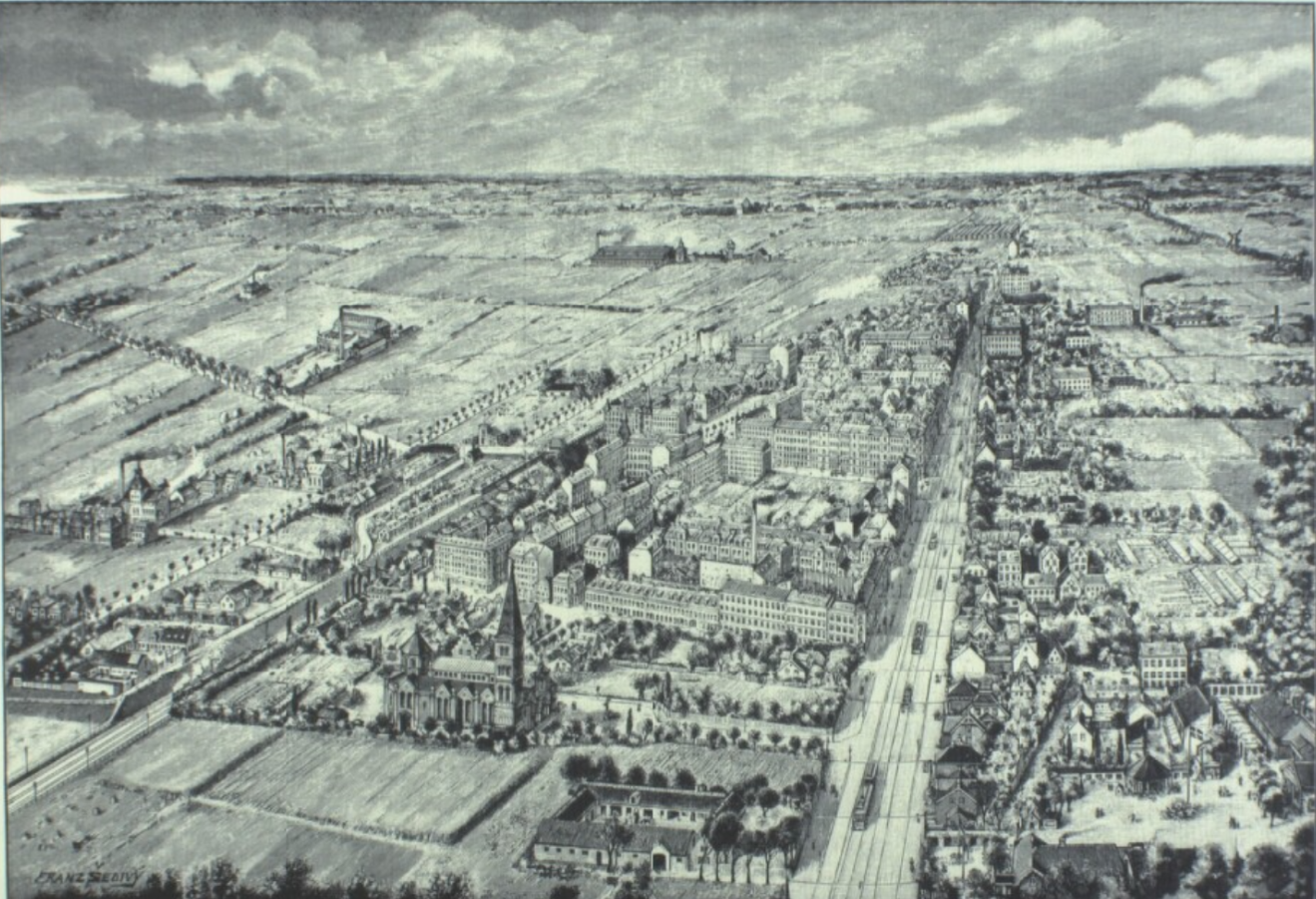
Valby Langgade, with the Gesis Church seen in a drawing from c. 1900

The apartment complex Viaadukten (No. 127-41), located just after the railway viaduct from which it takes its name, was designed by Arthur Wittmaack in 1920. Frederik Wagner designed the Famgården housing complex (No. 226-254), constructed in 1927–28, and Valbo and Langhuset (Valby Langgade 239-65/ Vestervang 8A-B), which were built in 1931.

The White Houses (Danish: Den Hvide By) is a development of building society houses from 1893 designed by Christian Mandrup-Poulsen for Valby Workers' Building Society. It consists of 77 double houses which originally contained two apartments in each house and four single houses with two apartments in each house. The development is located on Valby Langgade and the streets Søndre Allé, Nordre Allé and Østre Allé.

Akacieparken is a public housing estate with 394 apartments which was completed on a former industrial site in 1995. It was designed by Hvidt & Mølgaard.

== Notable buildings and residents ==
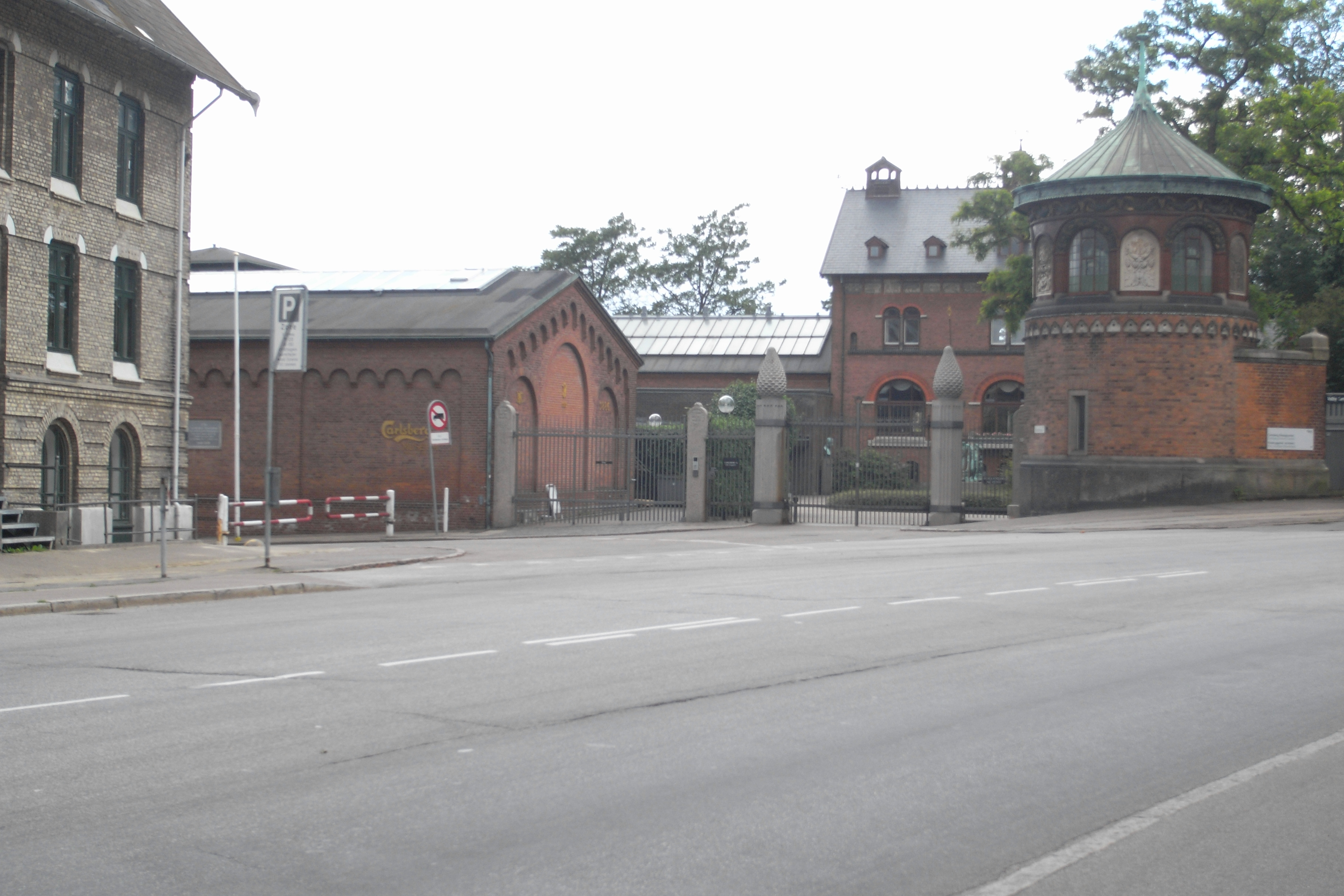
The entrance to Carl Jacobsen House at the site where Pile Allé turns into Valby Langgade

The Carl Jacobsen House (Valby Langgade 1) on the corner with Ny Carlsberg Vej is from the 1890s and is the former home of Carl Jacobsen. It was designed by Hack Kampmann and is attached to the former Carlsberg Museum which was later replaced by Ny Carlsberg Glyptotek and is now used as a conference venue. Carlsberg Group is building a new global headquarters which will span Gamle Carlsbergvej on an adjacent site.

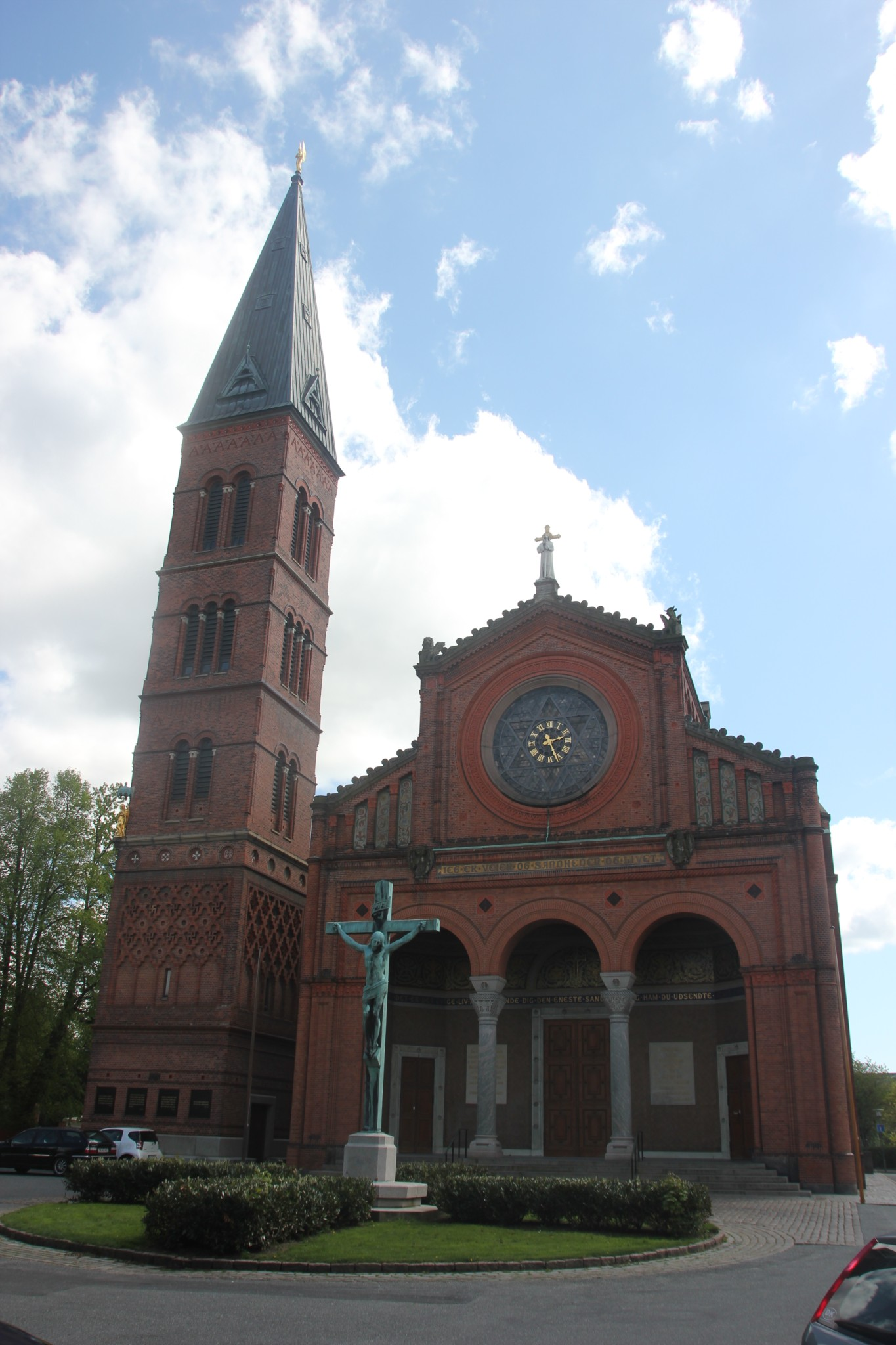
The Jesus Church

Carl Jacobsen was also responsible for the construction of the Jesus Church located a little further to the west, just off Valby Langgade. It dates from the 1890s and was designed by Vilhelm Dahlerup, who also designed several of the most iconic Carlsberg buildings. The church was built as a mausoleum for the Jacobsen family.

Between the brewery and the church, opposite Søndermarken, is an area of single family detached homes with many large villas from the 1910s and 1920s. The house at Valby Langgade 7A (1934) was designed by Thomas Havning and received the Art Academy's Annual Medal. No. 19, located next to the entrance to the Jesus Church, is from 1920 and was designed by Henning Hansen. It now houses the Danish YMCA (KFUM and KFUK). A number of houses located on both sides of Bjerregaardsvej have been merged into am eclectic headquarters for the company Edlund, a provider of IT solutions for the insurance industry. One of them is the National Romantic former home of the painter Frans Swartz. The former home of Aller Media founder Carl Aller is also located in the area.

The square and street Valby Tingsted is the historic centre of what is now known as Old Valby. The low house row at Valby Langgade No. 56 – 66 dates from the 19th century when Valby was still a village located outside Copenhagen. The oldest building in the area is a so-called rytterskole (cavalry school) from 1722, although it has seen many alterations, which now houses Valby Library (Annexstræde 2). The old Valby Forge is located at No. 55. The building at Valby Tingsted 3 is the former Valby Børneasyl (Valby Orphanage) from 1874. Valby Langgade No. 68-68A is the earliest example of the five- and six-story buildings that were built after the merger with Copenhagen.

The shopping centre Spinderiet, located on both sides of Annexstræde, is partly based in the former buildings of De Danske Bomuldsspinderier. The factory buildings from 1905–07 were converted into a mixed-use development by the architectural firm Entasis between 2004 and 2007. Valby School (Ved Ovnhallen 6), a public primary school, is based in the former buildings of the Norden Porcelain Factory.

== Public art ==
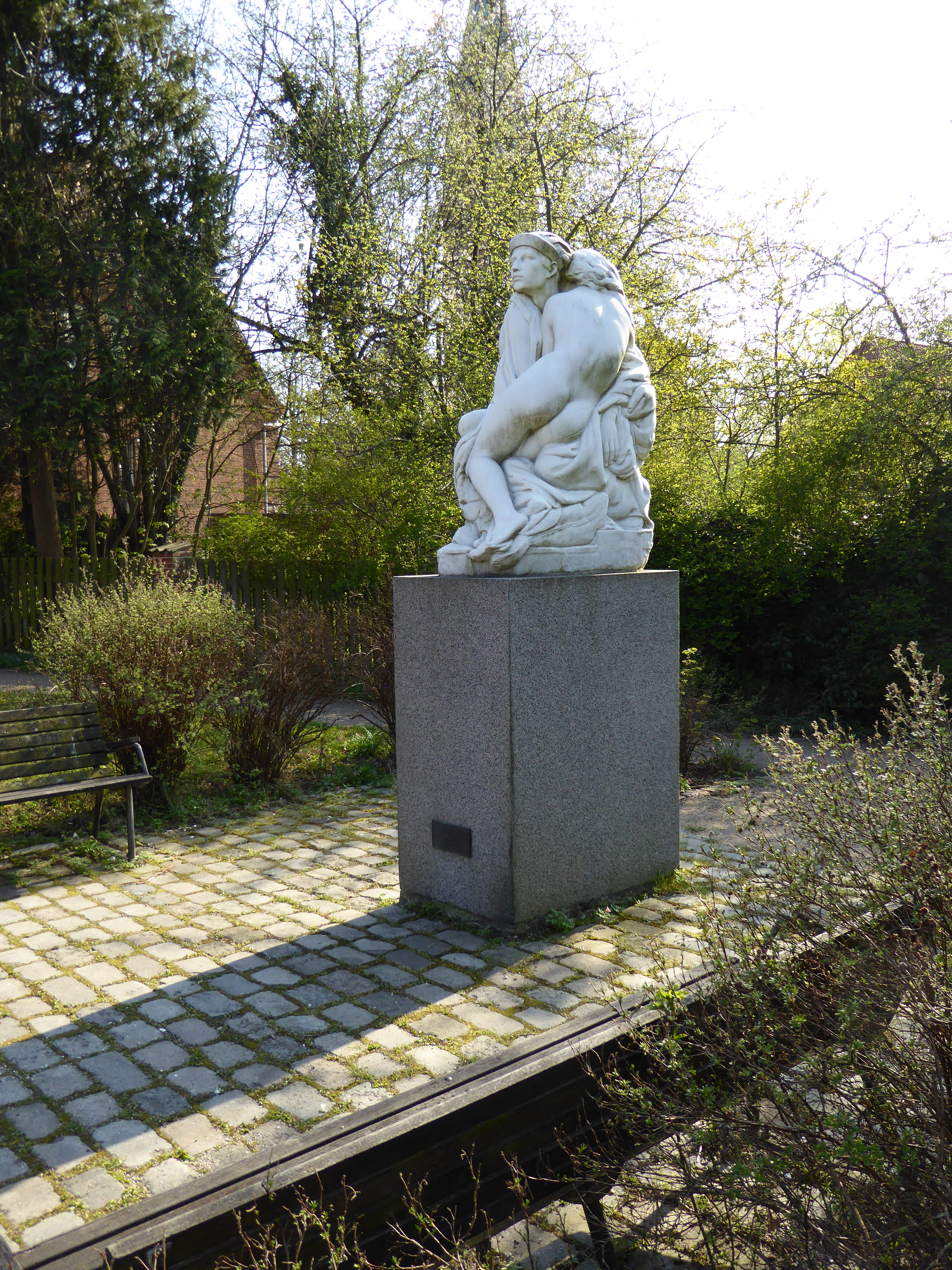
Marble sculpture by Anders Bundgaard

In a small green space at the corner of Valby Langgade and Skovbogårds Allé stands a marble sculpture by Anders Bundgaard entitled And Day Dawns with its Thousand Demands (Og Dagen runder, Med sine tusinde Krav). It was installed in 1937 by Copenhagen Municipality.

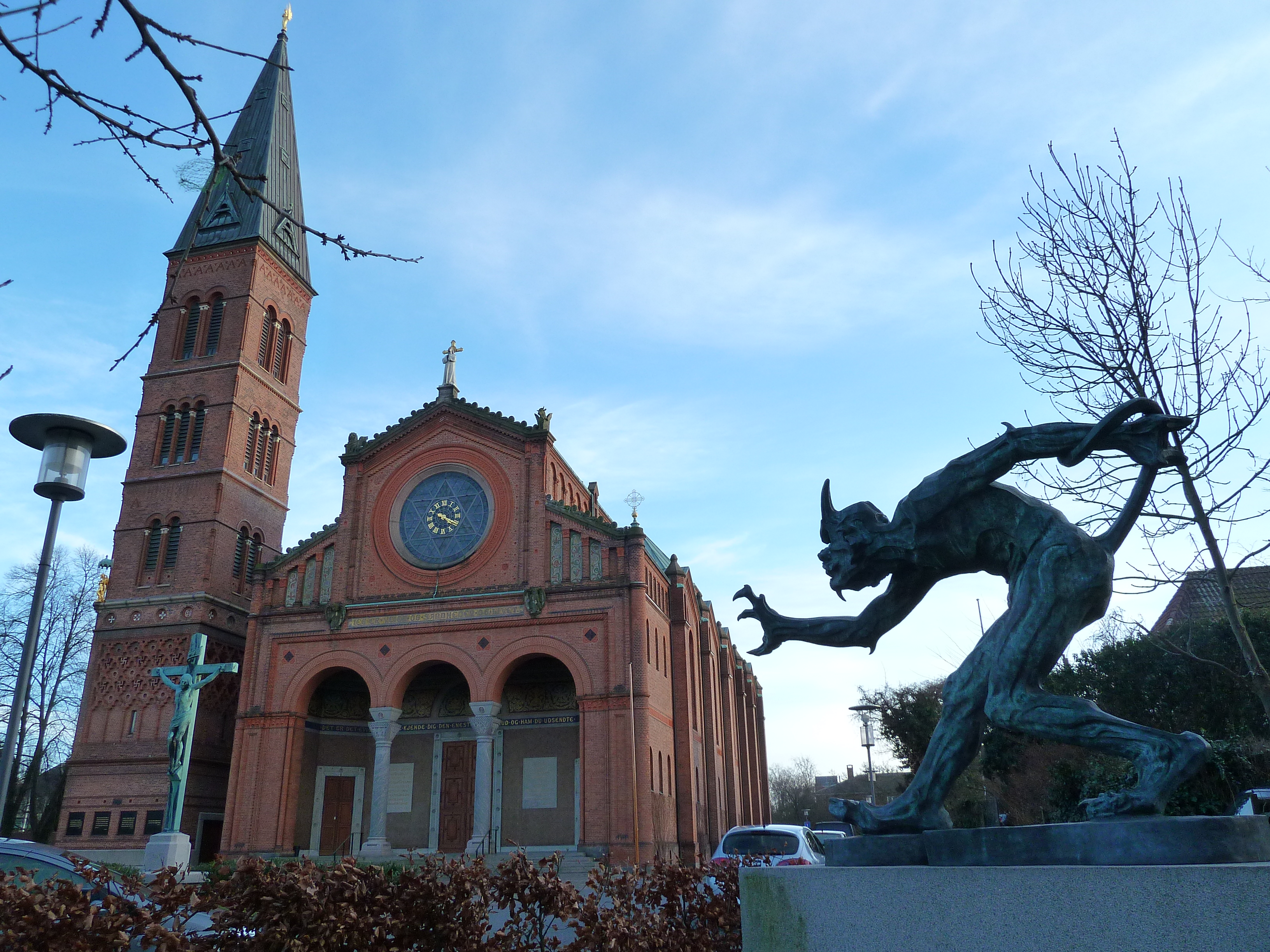
The Troll

In a circular flowerbed in front of the Jesus Church stands a crucifix designed by the sculptor Jens Adolf Jerichau. It replaced a copy of Michelangelo's sculpture Moses from the church San Pietro in Vincoli in Rome that was transferred to the Carlsberg Glyptoteque. Adjacent to the crucifix but just outside the church's perimeter, stands the sculpture Troll that smells Christian blood depicting a fierce-looking troll reaching out for the crucifix. As the tableau proved too controversial for the parish, it was quickly moved to the Glyptoteque garden. In 2002, the church tried to recover the sculpture, but the Glyptoteque would not part with it. A copy was therefore made and placed just in front of the church in its proper place. Hanne Varming's sculpture Woman with Dogs (Konen med Hundene) was installed on Valby Tingsted on 7 May 2013.

On the gable of Valby Langgade 132–36, just west of Valby Langgade station and facing Herman Bangs Plads, is a poem by Søren Ulrik Thomsen in neon lettering. It was created in collaboration with Rasmus Koch and installed in 2014.

== Transport ==
Langgade railway station is located on the Frederikssund radial of Copenhagen's S-train network. It is served by the C trains. Ålholm railway station on Ålholm Plads at the western end of the street is located on the Ring Line and is served by the F trains. Carlsberg railway station which opened in July 2016 is located close to the beginning of the street.

== Cultural references ==
Valby Langgade 72 is used as a location in the 1971 Olsen-banden film The Olsen Gang in Jutland.

== See also ==
- Carl Jacobsens Vej
- Vigerslev Allé
