= Valby =

District of Copenhagen

- District of Copenhagen
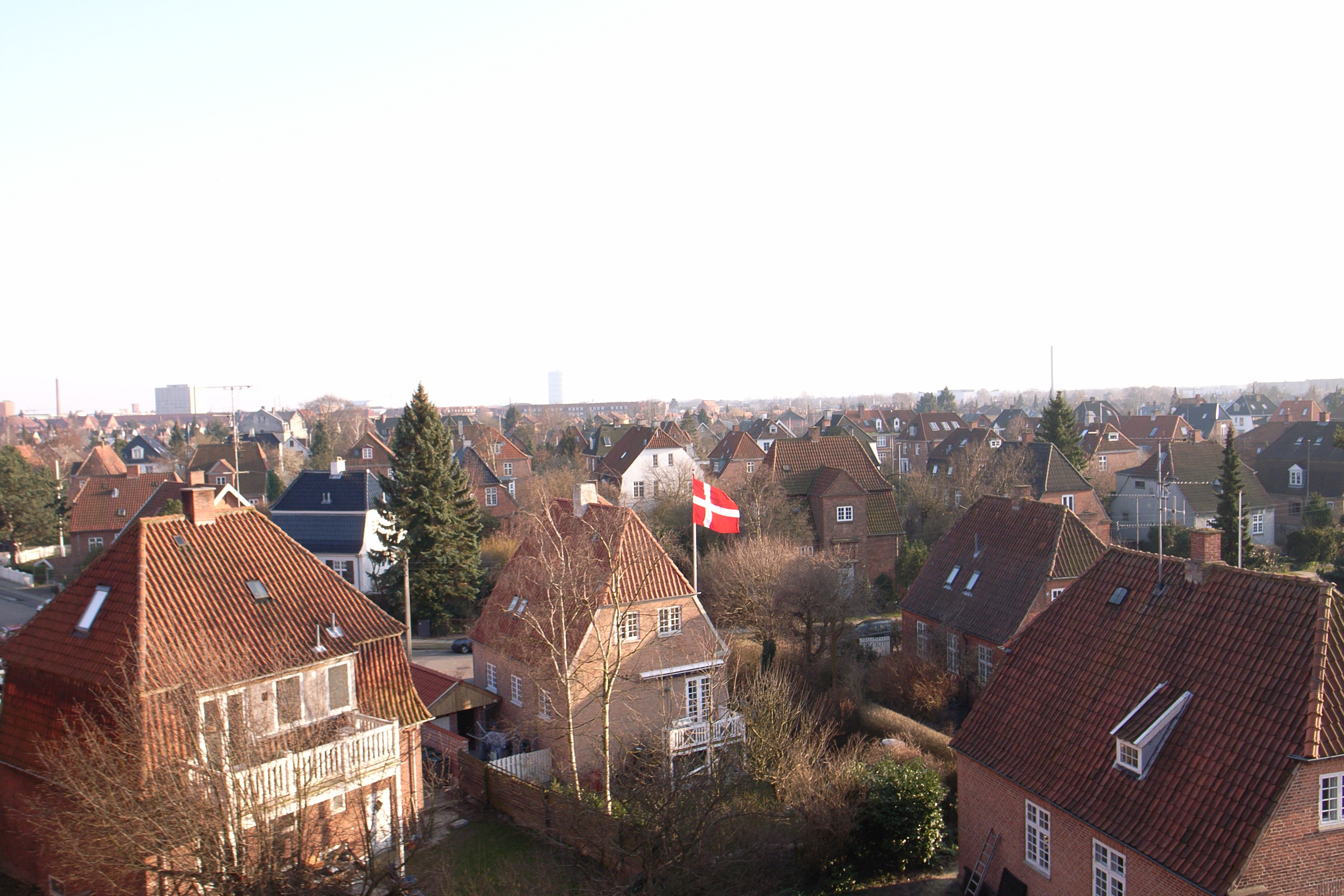
- Single family detached homes south of Valby Langgade
- Interactive map of Valby
- Country: Denmark
- Region: Capital Region of Denmark
- Municipality: Copenhagen Municipality
- Postal code: 2500

Valby ([vælpyˀ]) is one of the 10 official districts of Copenhagen Municipality, Denmark. It is in the southwestern corner of Copenhagen Municipality, and has a mixture of different types of housing. This includes apartment blocks, terraced housing, areas with single-family houses and allotments, plus the remaining part of the old Valby village, around which the district has formed, intermingled with past and present industrial sites.

Valby Hill marks the boundary between Valby and the more central and urban neighbouring Vesterbro district. The expression "west of Valby Hill" is in Danish often used as a metonym for "the provinces" or "outside Copenhagen". Separated from the rest of Copenhagen by Vestre Cemetery, Denmark's largest cemetery, towards Vesterbro/Kongens Enghave and Søndermarken-Frederiksberg Gardens towards Frederiksberg, the Carlsberg brewery site, and areas of low density, Valby retains a certain air of 'independence', or isolation, even today. With the progressing redevelopment of the Carlsberg area into a new lively, high-density neighbourhood, this is likely to change. Other former industrial sites are also under redevelopment and Valby is today one of the districts in Copenhagen with the fastest growing population.

== Geography ==
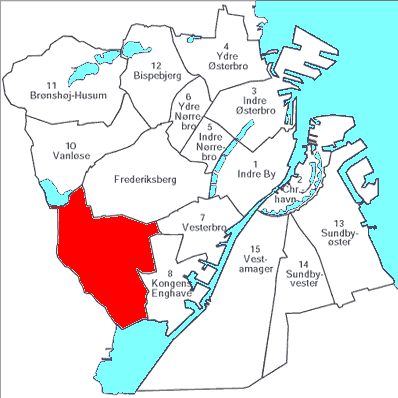
Location of Valby within Copenhagen

Valby covers an area of 9,23 km^{2} and has a population of 66.435, giving a population density of 7.197 per km^{2}. The district is bounded by Kongens Enghave and Vesterbro to the east, Frederiksberg to the north, Vanløse to the north-east and Hvidovre Municipality to the west, while Kalvebod Beach, the shallow-watered area just south of Copenhagen Harbour, separates it from the island of Amager to the south.

The most distinctive geographical features of the district are Valby Hill in its north-eastern corner and Harrestrup Å which marks its western boundary. Valby also borders on Damhus Lake in its extreme north-western corner.

== History ==
=== Origins ===
The Danshøj tumulus, along with many other archeological finds in the area, provides evidence that the Valby area has been inhabited since ancient times. Modern Valby has developed around the two villages of Valby and Vigerslev. The first recorded mention of the name Valby is from 1186, as Walbu, but the history of both settlements probably goes back considerably longer. Valby means "village/house on the plain". In the early Middle Ages both villages came under Utterslev, a Crown estate which included most of the area around Havn, the small market town which later became Copenhagen.

In 1167, Valdemar I granted both Havn and the Utterslev estate to the Bishop's Seat of Roskilde but in 1417 the villages came under the Crown once again when King Eric VII made Copenhagen a royal possession.

=== 16th and 17th century ===
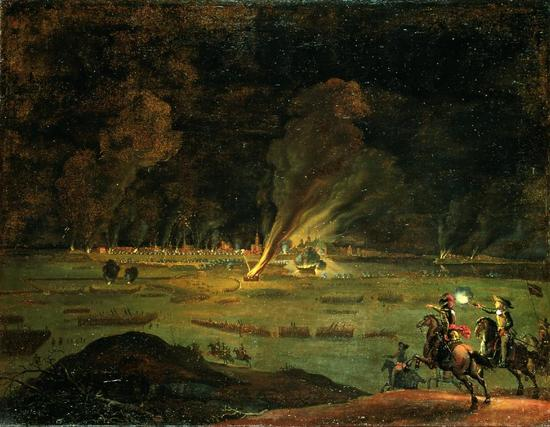
Daniel Vertangen: The Assault on Copenhagen seen from Valby Hill

Both during the civil war leading up to the Reformation (1533–1536) and during the Assault on Copenhagen in the Second Northern War, Valby was faced with almost complete destruction (1658–60), leading to deep poverty for the communities.

In 1682, Valby had 13 farms and 25 houses with no more land than a modest garden. The produce from this intensely cultivated area was, in fierce competition with the Amager farmers, sold on the market at Amagertorv in Copenhagen, where King Christian IV had granted the Valby farmers trading privileges.

At the time, the Valby community did not have its own church but instead, since 1628, belonged to Hvidovre Parish. In 1675, Hvidovre Church was extended with a Valby nave, both to bring symmetry into the design and to accommodate a wish among the citizens of Valby not to mingle with the Hvidovre farmers.

=== 18th century ===
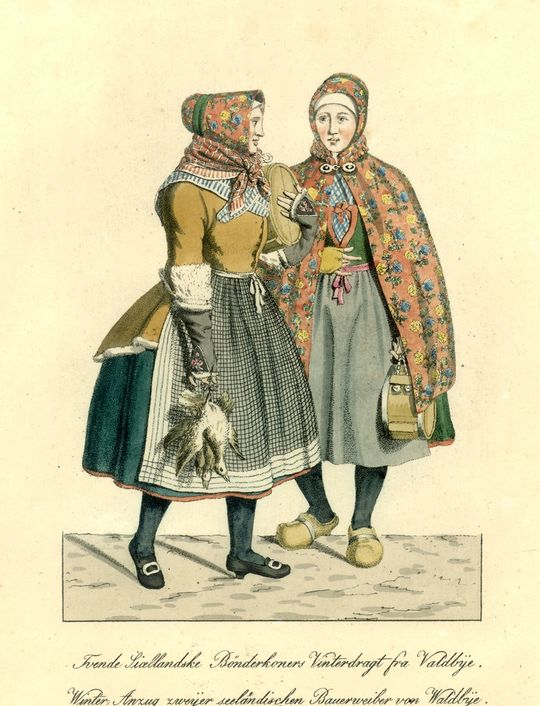
Valby women at Gammeltorv c. 1800, engraving by Gerhard Ludvig Lahde

In the 17th century, the road to Roskilde was taken through Valby and an inn opened. The first holder of the license was Hans Pedersen Bladt, a skillful merchant who was elected mayor of Copenhagen in 1675.

Valby also profited from the proximity of Frederiksberg Palace which was constructed from 1699 to 1703 atop Valby Hill as a new summer residence for King Frederick IV. The royal presence in the area brought along more activity in the village. It is said that Queen Marie Sophie, consort of King Frederick VI, often rode through Valby, handing out candy to the children.

In 1721, the king granted the community new trading privileges and a Rytterskole, a precursor of the Danish public school, was built the following year. Valby became particularly associated with raising poultry which the Valby women sold beside the Caritas Well on Gammeltorv in Copenhagen. The trade took place on Wednesdays and Saturdays, which were market days, until 1857.

=== Leisure destination and the first station ===
In 1776, the road to Roskilde was given a new course, a direct continuation of Vesterbrogade across Valby Hill, with the effect that it bypassed Valby to the detriment of the inn and other businesses.

Instead Valby began to develop into an area where members of the bourgeoisie took up summer residency, a practice which spread from adjoining Frederiksberg. One of the first to arrive in Valby proper was the actor James Price who spent his first summer there in 1795, shortly after his arrival in Denmark. He was followed by other members of the bourgeoisie.

When the first railway out of Copenhagen opened in 1847, a 30 km railway line to Roskilde, it had an intermediate station slightly east of where Valby railway station lies today. The station was originally meant to serve mostly leisure trips to nearby Frederiksberg; it had a booming traffic in the railway's first years, which however dwindled as the novelty wore off. The station was closed in 1864 when the second main station in Copenhagen opened and the railway was rerouted through Frederiksberg railway station instead.

=== Arrival of Carlsberg ===
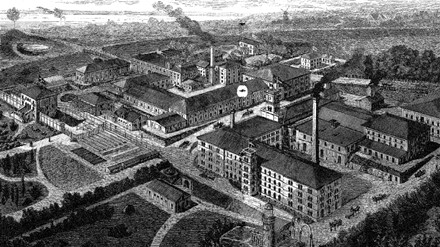
Carlsberg, c. 1883

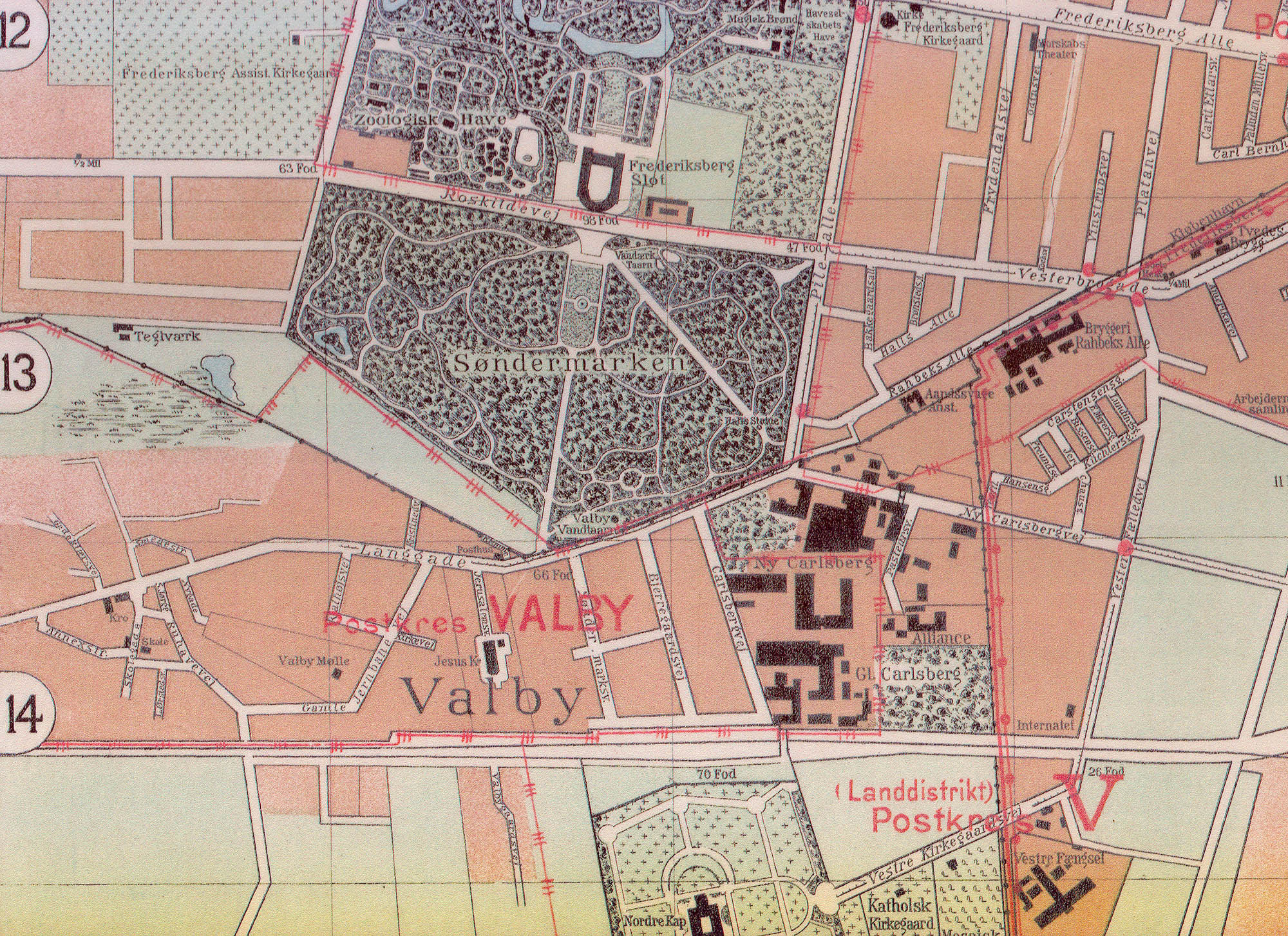
Map detail showing Valby in 1896

During the construction of the new railway, when the tracks were dug through Valby Hill, a natural spring was discovered. This attracted the brew master J. C. Jacobsen to the site and he founded his Carlsberg Brewery in 1847 on the eastern slopes of the hill. In 1882, Carl Jacobsen, J. C. Jacobsen's son, opened his own brewery at a neighbouring site after a controversy with his father. Over the following decades both breweries grew and were later merged.

Carl Jacobsen also became the driving force behind Valby's first church, the large Jesus Church, which he financed with money he inherited from his father. The new church was consecrated on 15 November 1891 but it remained under Hvidovre Parish for another decade.

=== 20th century ===
In 1901, the Valby area was transferred to Copenhagen Municipality and became increasingly urbanized, with both new residential areas and industry. Ole Olsen established the Nordisk Film film studios in 1906. The following year the Danish Cotton Factories opened their Valby Spinning Mill in central Valby. Other companies established in the area early in the century were Carl Aller's Aller Press and C.F. Rich & Sønner, a manufacturer of coffee substitutes. F L Smidth & Co relocated its activities to a huge site in central Valby in 1956.

== Neighborhoods ==
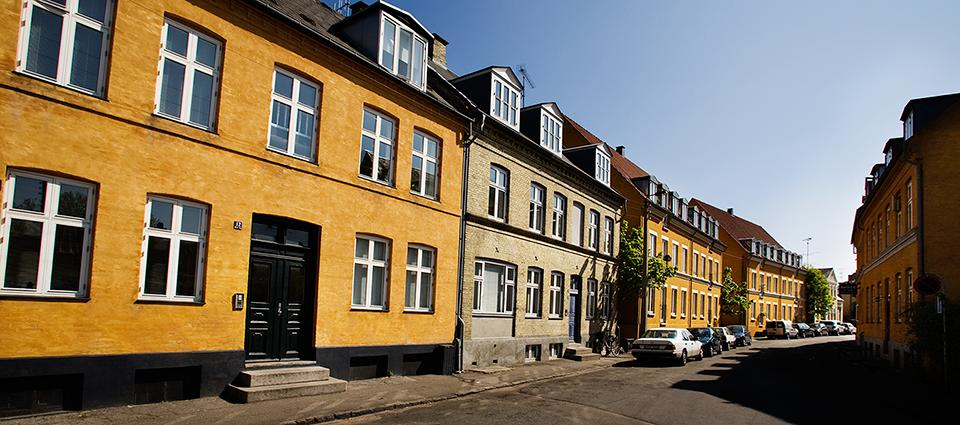
Houses on Smedestræde in Old Valby dating from the 1880s when Valby was transformed from a village to a suburb

The remains of Old Valby are located in the northern part of the district on Valby Langgade, the old road to Roskilde, which today extends from Carlsberg, as the continuation of Pile Allé, and runs west along the municipal border with Frederiksberg until it finally joins the new Roskildevej at Damhus Lake.

=== City centre ===
The centre of modern-day Valby is the area around Toftegårds Plads which was refurbished in 2011. New facilities on the square include ball cages, a climbing wall made out of glass and a mobile stage. Valby Cultural Centre, Valby railway station and Spinderiet shopping centre are all located next to the square, the latter with direct access to the station platforms. Two major arteries connect to the square. Vigerslev Allé extends west along the railway tracks from Enghavevej, at the border between Vesterbro and Kongens Enghave, and passes Toftegårds Plads before turning into Allingevej at the intersection with Hvidovrevej further west. Gammel Køge Landevej extends south and forms part of the secondary route 151.

=== White Houses ===
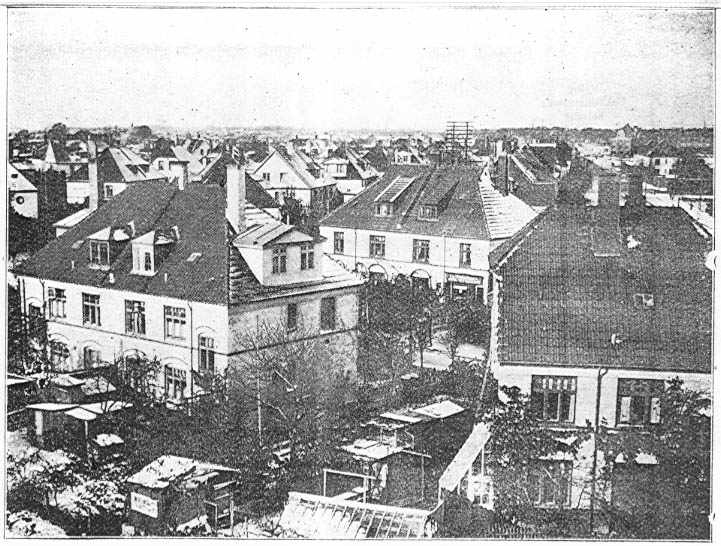
The White Houses viewed from Valby Langgade, 1930.

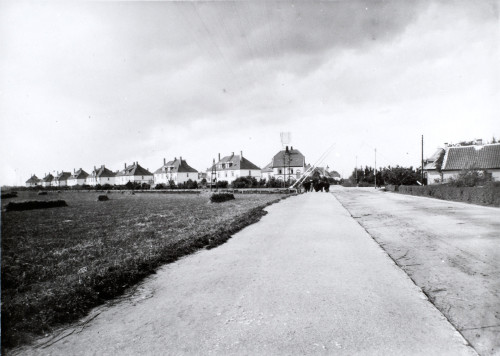
The White Houses viewed from Valby Langgade, 1909.

The White Houses in Valby (Danish: Den Hvide By i Valby), also known as Trekanten (lit. "The Triangle"), is one of several developments of building society houses in the Valby district of Copenhagen, Denmark and are located on the south side of Valby Langgade and the streets Søndre Allé, Nordre Allé and Østre Allé. They are similar to another development of white houses in Frederiksberg.

Valby Arbejderes Byggeforening (English: Valby Workers' Building Society) was founded on 17 May 1898 and quickly acquired an approximately five-hectare, triangular site from a local farmer for DKK 47,000. The 34-year-old architect Christian Mandrup-Poulsen was commissioned to design the development and the foundation stone for the first house was set on 26 November 1899. All of the development's original houses were then built between 1899 and 1903.

Mandrup-Poulsen's plan created three tree-lined avenues—Søndre Allé, Nordre Allé and Østre Allé—which form a large "A" off the south side of Valby Langgade. The development consists of a total of 81 houses of which 77 are double houses and four are single houses. Each house contained originally two apartments, one for the owner and one for a tenant. Mandrup-Poulsen created seven different house types but all were white with red tile roofs and green window frames and fences. Most have details in red brick.

== Government ==
The Danish Maritime Authority and the Danish Maritime Accident Investigation Board had their head offices in Valby before moving to Korsør.

== Amenities ==
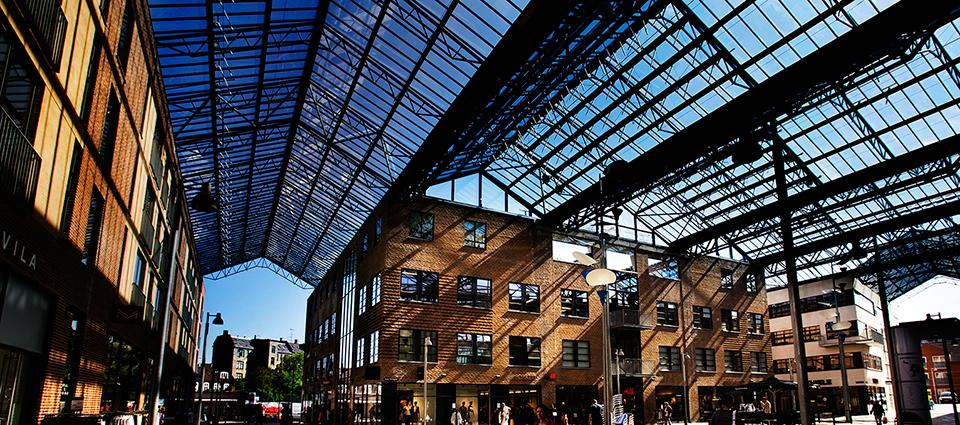
The Spinning Mill, now a mixed use development

Located off Gammel Køge Landevej, Valby Sports Park contains a multi-purpose stadium which is mainly used for football. A new aquatics centre is currently under construction and will open on February 2+12.

The major green spaces in the district are Valby Park, the largest park in Copenhagen, and Vigerslev Park which runs along Harrestrup Å and the western boundary of the district, from Gammel Køge Landevej in the south to Roskildevej at the Damhus Lake with the Damhus Meadow in the north. The Carlsberg area also contains two historic gardens one of which is now open to the public.

=== Future development ===
Some major plans for the Valby district include:

- Carlsberg: A masterplan for the redevelopment of the Carlsberg area has been made by the architectural firm Entasis.
- Grøntorvet: There are plans to redevelop Grøntorvet, Copenhagen's vegetable wholesale market, following a move of the current market activities to the new and larger Copenhagen Markets in Høje Taastrup in 2013. After that there are plans to redevelop the 30 ha area into a new dense neighbourhood. Juul & Frost and Dorte Mandrup Architects have made a masterplan for the area. A pamphlet about the plans can be seen here.
- Harrestrup Å: Copenhagen Municipality, in collaboration with some of the neighbouring municipalities, have launched a project for the ecological restoration of the natural environment of Harrestrup Å and the creation of a sandy beach along Valby's shoreline at Valbyparken. It is expected to cost more than DKK 500,000,000, making it the most expensive such restoration project in Denmark.
- Infrastructure: A new lightrail line through Valby is currently under consideration. Atkins gas was commissioned to make a preliminary report which was published in 2011. The proposal involves a line from Enghave Plads through the Carlsberg and along Valby Langgade to Hvidovre Hospital. More information about the project can be found here (in Danish).

== Sports ==
Boldklubben Frem (also known as Frem, BK Frem or BK Frem Copenhagen) is a popular football club based in Valby-Sydhavnen. Frem plays its home games at Valby Idrætspark. Since its foundation in 1886, Frem has won the Danish Championships six times and the Danish Cup twice. Frem fans are especially known for unconditional love and support.

== Transport ==
=== Rail transport ===
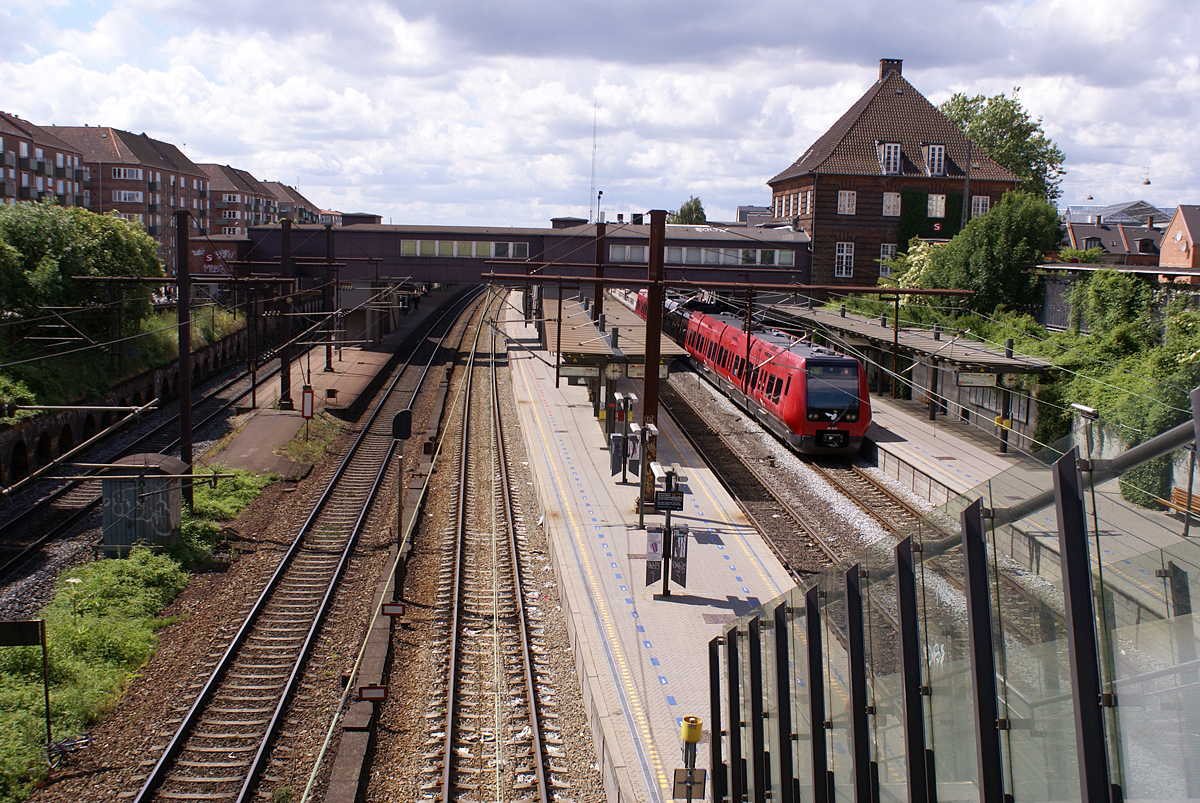
Valby station

Valby is well served by S-trains. Valby station is centrally located next to Toftegårds Plads. It is located where the Tåstrup and Frederikssund radials diverge, and is served by trains on either radial. Some regional and intercity trains also stop at Valby, mainly to provide transfers to the Frederikssund S-trains. Langgade station near Valby's eastern border with Kongens Enghave is also located on the Frederikssund line. Copenhagen South railway station is becoming a major hub which serves as an interchange station between the Køge radial, the ring line which connects the station to Hellerup station north of Copenhagen through the suburbs, and the M4 metro line. Danshøj station serves mainly as an interchange station between B trains (on the Tåstrup radial) and F trains on the ring line. Other stations in Valby serving the ring line are Ålholm station and Vigerslev Allé station.

== Cultural references ==
The 1989 Swedish-Danish drama film The Miracle in Valby takes place in Valby. Also, in the Olsen-banden films, the eponymous gang lives in Valby.

== Notable people ==
- Morten Duncan Rasmussen (born 1985), footballer, was born in Valby
- Duke Jordan retired here after his extensive solo career

== Gallery ==
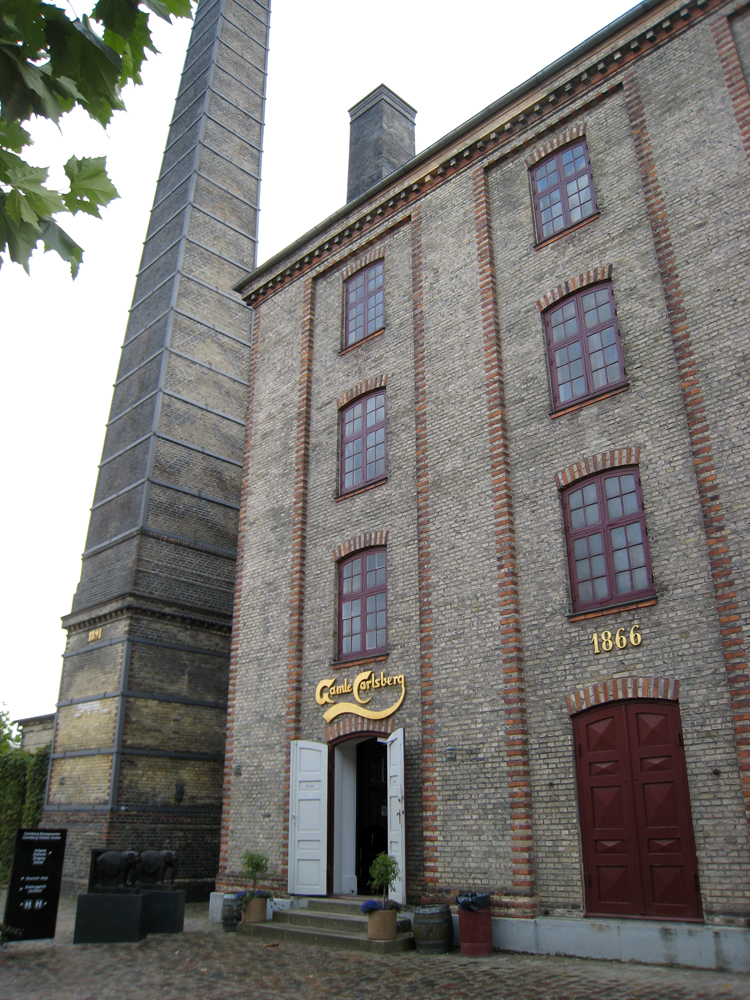
Old Carlsberg

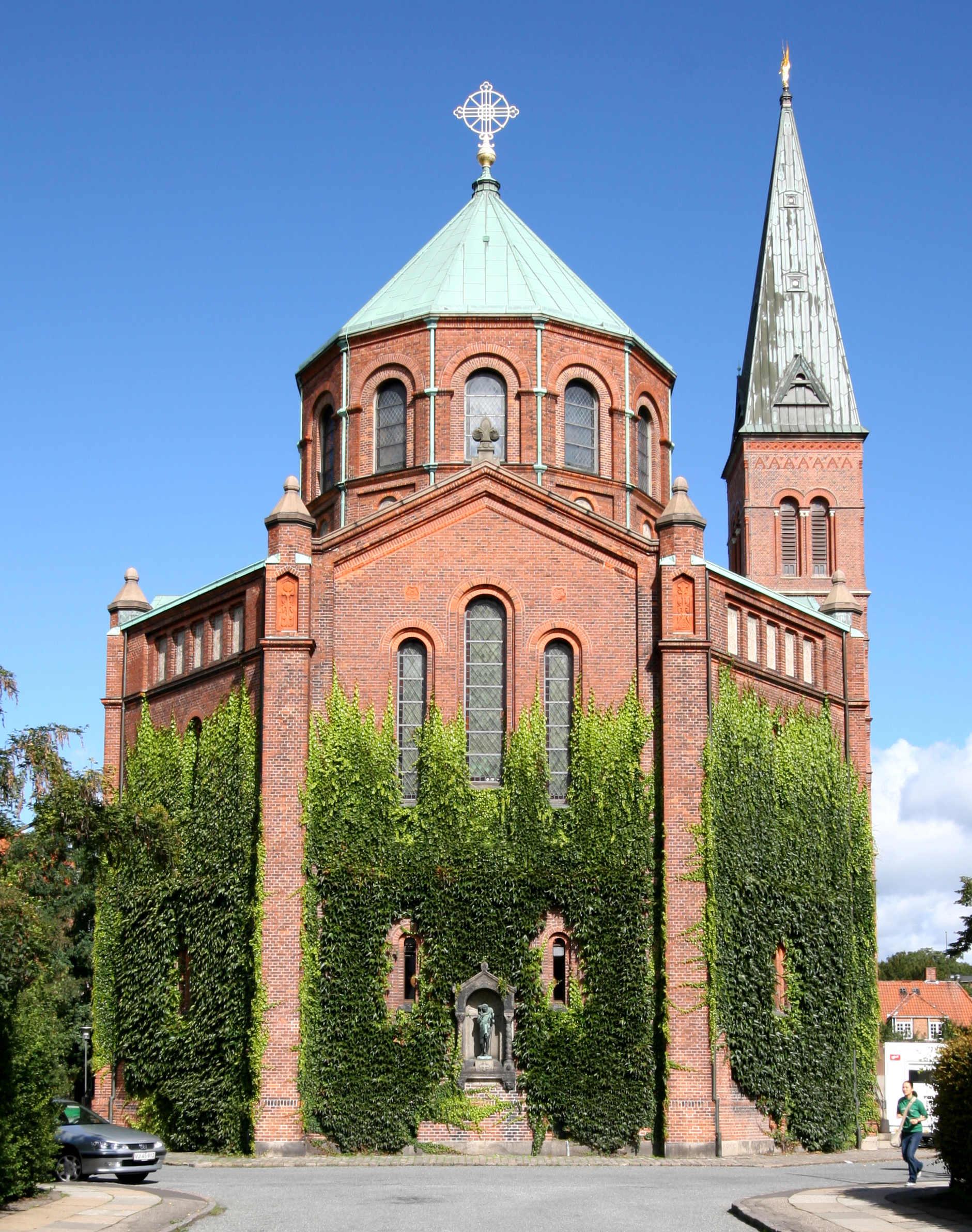
The Jesus Church, rear side

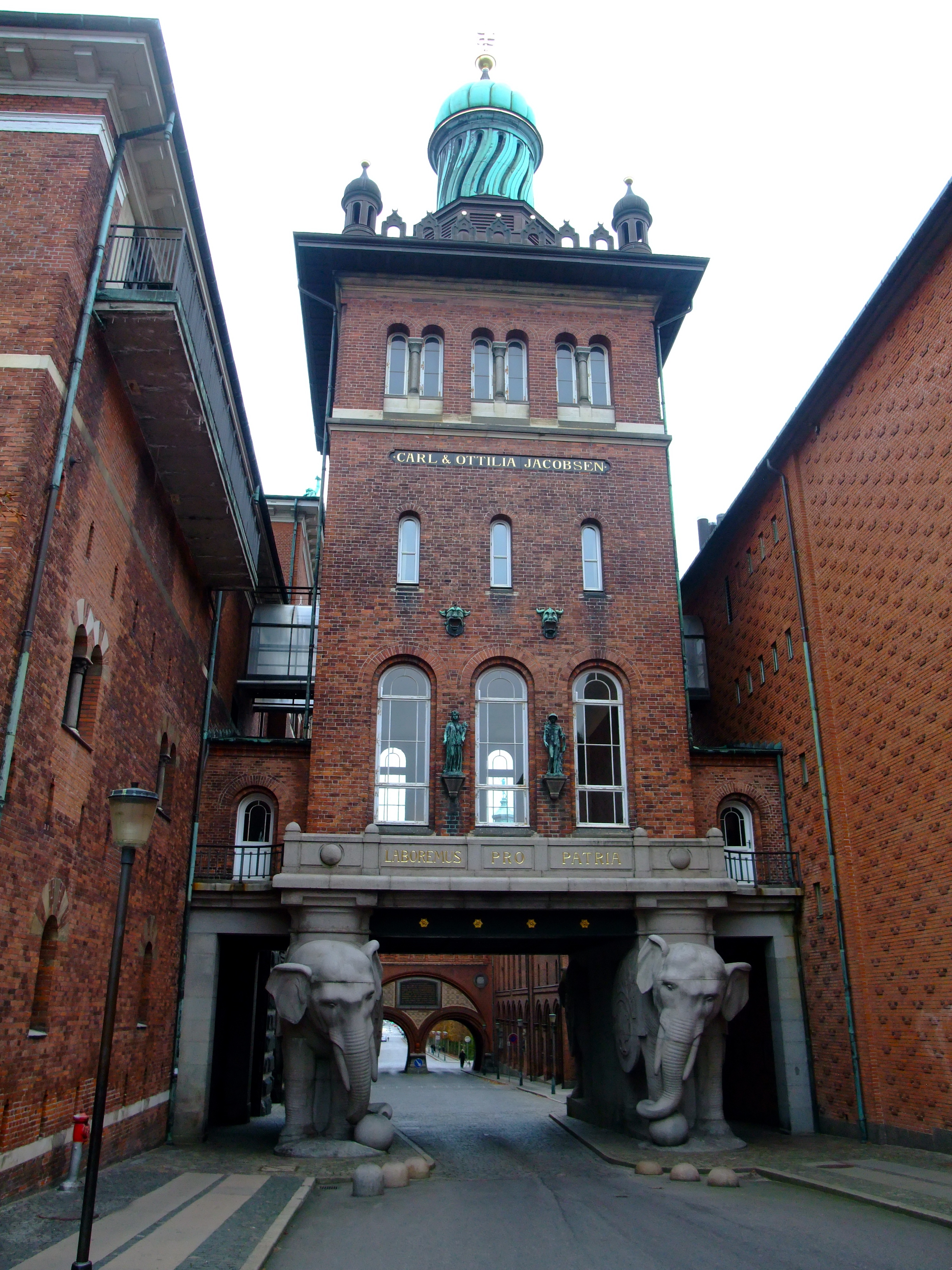
The Elephant Gate, the entrance to the Ny Carlsberg complex from the Valby side

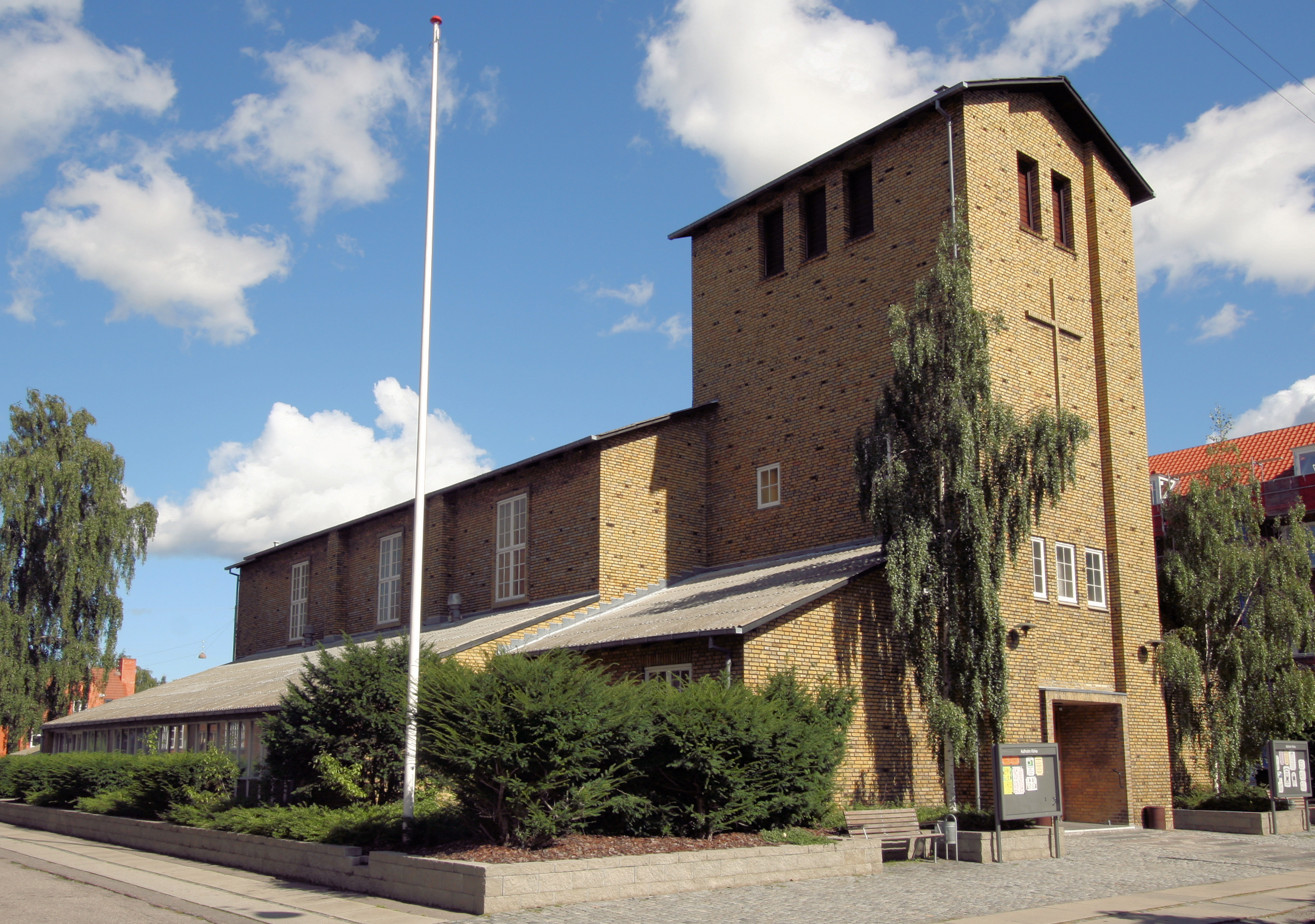
Aalholm Church, built in 1938

== See also ==
- Lyset
