= Jesus Church, Copenhagen =

Jesus Church
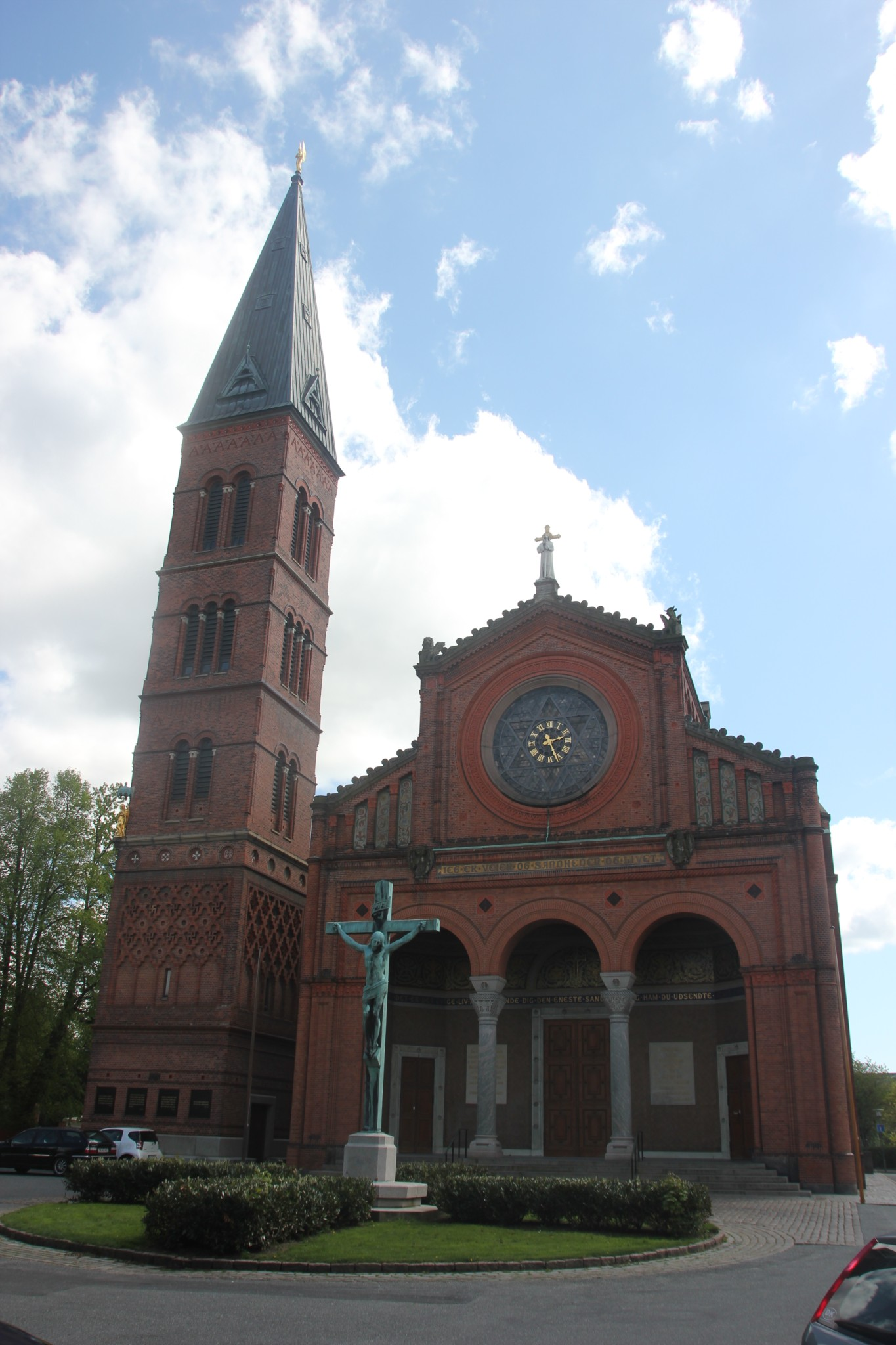
- Jesus Church seen from across the street
- Jesus Church
- 55°39′55″N 12°31′19.5″E
- Location: Kirkevænget 5b 2500, Valby, Copenhagen
- Country: Denmark
- Denomination: Church of Denmark

History
- Status: Church

Architecture
- Architect: Vilhelm Dahlerup
- Style: Historicism
- Completed: 1895

Specifications
- Length: 50 m
- Width: 17.5
- Height: 52 m (campanile)
- Materials: Brick

Administration
- Archdiocese: Diocese of Copenhagen

The Jesus Church (Danish: Jesuskirken) is a church situated just off Valby Langgade in the Valby district of Copenhagen, Denmark. It was commissioned by second-generation Carlsberg brewer Carl Jacobsen and designed by Vilhelm Dahlerup. Noted for its extensive ornamentation and artwork, it is considered to be one of the country's most idiosyncratic and unconventional examples of church architecture. The church was built as a mausoleum for Carl Jacobsen and his family and is located close to their former house as well as the former Carlsberg brewery site. Their sarcophagi lie in the crypt. Throughout the church, there are ornaments and inscriptions associated with the family.

== History ==
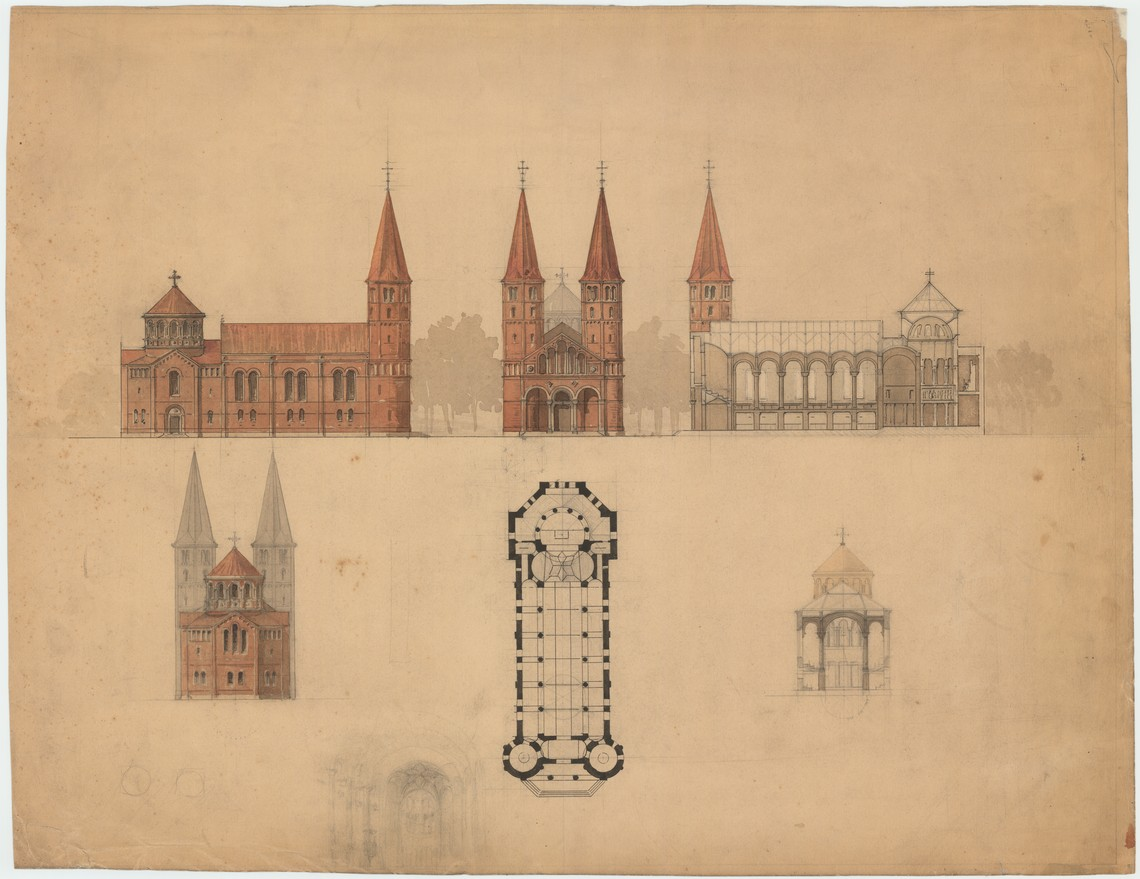
Non-final design proposal with two towers

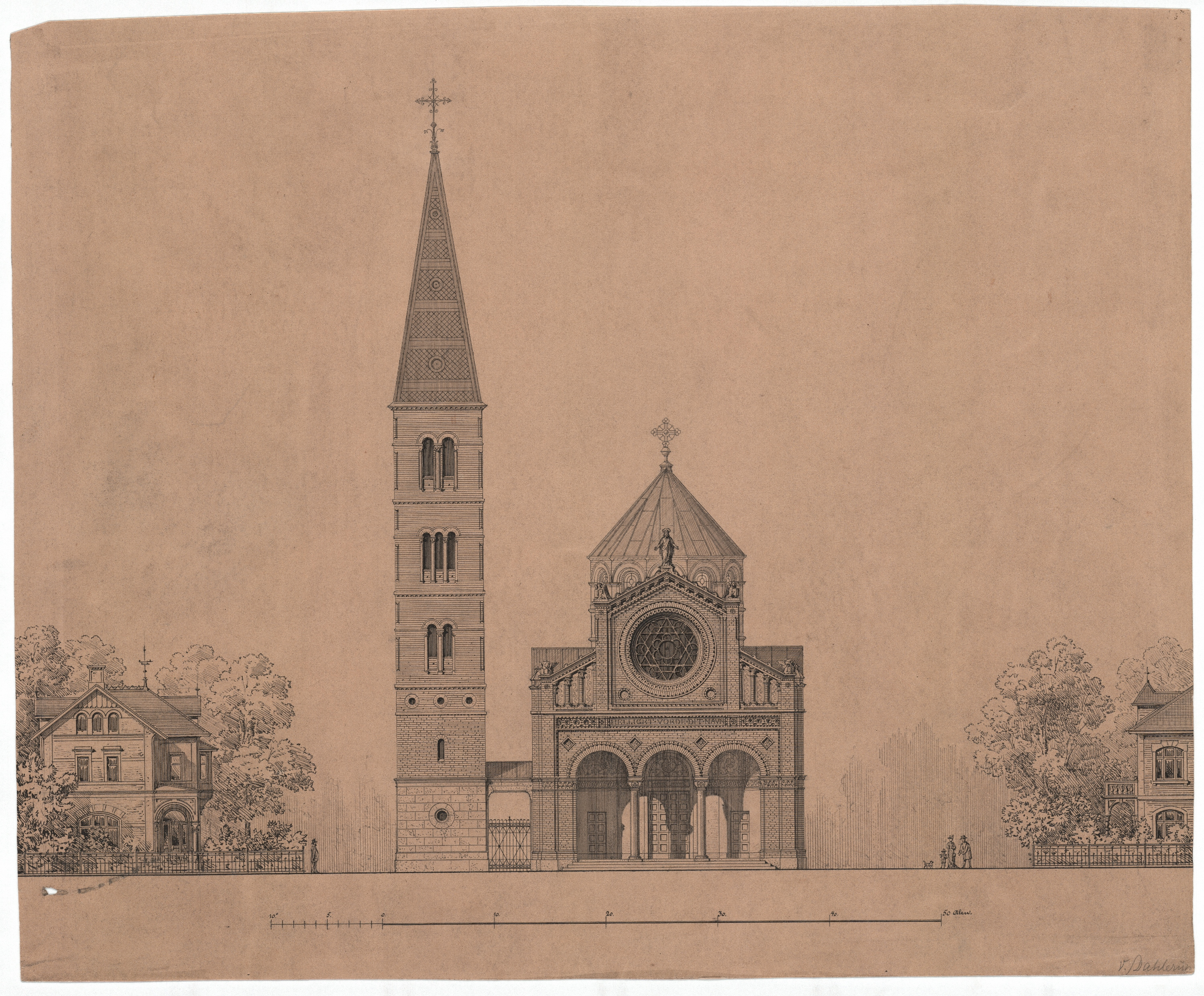
One of Dahlerup's renderings

Jacobsen's father, J. C. Jacobsen, had decided to bequeath Gammel Carlsberg to the Carlsberg Foundation. On his death, Carl Jacobsen received a sum of 1,000,000 Danish kroner. In 1883, he and his wife Ottilia decided to divide the money into four equal amounts, creating four "Ny Carlsberg Grants". The first of these was the "Ny Carlsberg Church Grant" that was to fund the creation of a new church in Valby within 10 years.

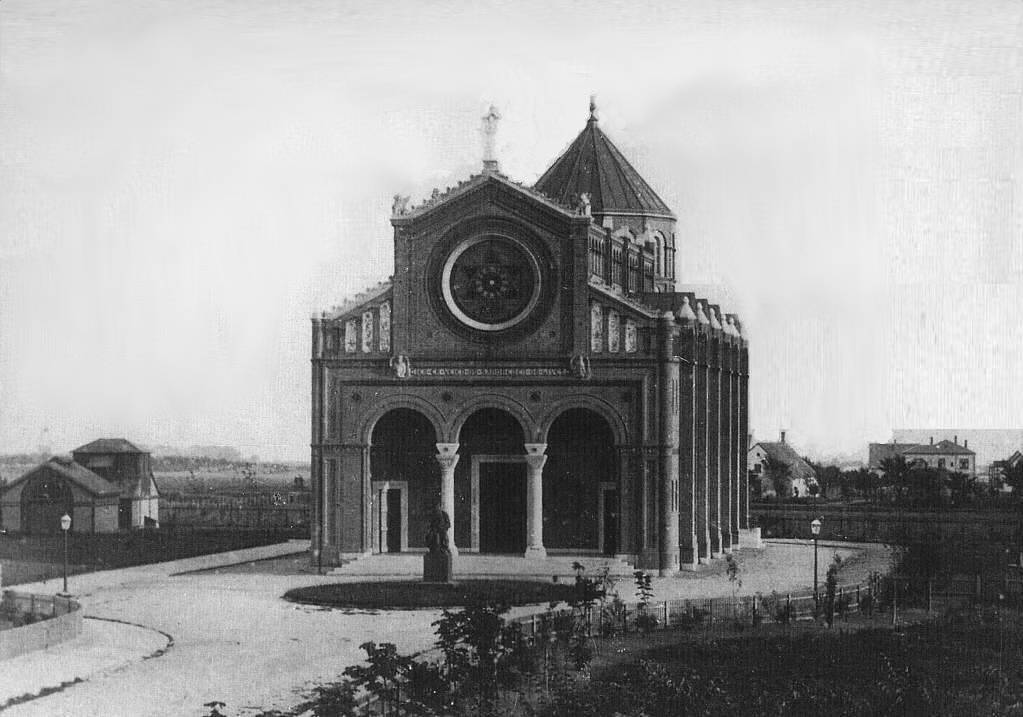
Drawing of the church from before the campenile was built

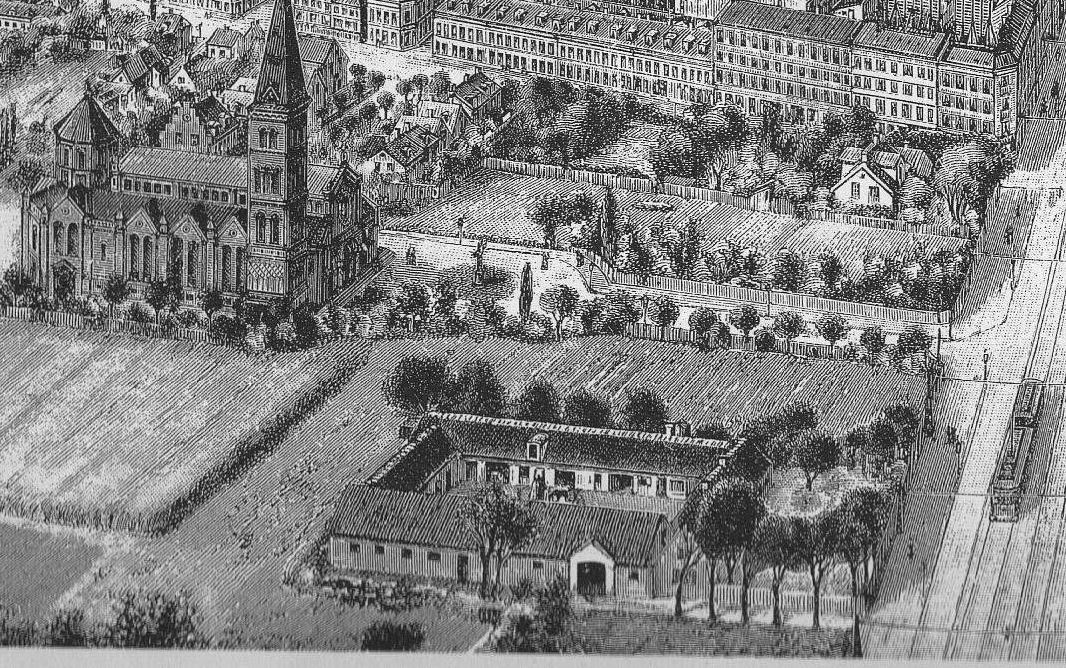
The church in 1909

Jacobsen had already acquired the land in 1879 and in 1882 he assigned Vilhelm Dahlerup to the project. He requested a church which would "surpass all other churches in Copenhagen in beauty", specifying that it should be in the style of early Christian basilica architecture as seen in Italy and France.

The sum proved inadequate but, thinking more about art than money, Carl Jacobsen continued the project regardless. On completion of the work, the costs had exceeded the original budget fourfold.

Construction of the church was begun in 1884 and it was consecrated on 15 November 1891. However, the campanile was not added until 1894–95 as a birthday present from his mother.

== The building ==
The church's designer, Vilhelm Dahlerup, certainly the leading Danish architect of the period, is remembered for his historistic style whereby he created new buildings on the basis of older, classical examples. There were, however, rather precise instructions on how the Jesus Church should be designed. In particular, Jacobsen provided Dahlerup with a number of photographs of the old churches and artwork in Ravenna, Italy, as an example of the ornate style he wished to see copied in Copenhagen. Dahlerup was also inspired by Notre-Dame la Grande in Poitiers, France, and by the synagogue in Toledo, Spain.

The church is indeed designed in the classic style of an early basilica with a campanile or detached bell tower. For the Danish Lutheran community, its style and rich ornamentation were rather unconventional, prompting a fair amount of criticism at the time. At one point, Carl Jacobsen was described by his own priest as a freethinker, unready to follow the trends and the dogma of the day.

== Exterior ==
Unusually, the church is oriented along a north–south axis with the altar at the southern end. It is built as a basilica with a triangular chancel, topped by a nonagonal dome with a pyramidal spire. The campanile tower stands close to the north-east corner of the church.

The main facade is dominated by three large arches, resting on two heavy granite columns with characteristic twin capitals leading into the portico. Above the arches, the pediment has intricate ornamentation. In the corners are the four Evangelists' symbols: Mathew's angel to the lower left, Mark's lion on the upper left, John's eagle on the upper right, Luke's ox on the lower and at the very top in the centre, a naked Jesus leaning against a cross. The centre of the pediment boasts a rose window, the largest of its kind in Denmark, composed of cathedral glass in yellow, red and green nuances supported by cames of lead. It has a diameter of 4.5 meters.

Measuring 1.7 meters in diameter, the cast bronze clock face weighs 261 kg. The surrounding star made up of two triangles is made of massive wrought iron bars, weighing 900 kg.

The rear southern side of the church boasts two columns and an arch with carved symbols of the Zodiac. It rests on the heads of the Green Man and the Horned God. The top of the arch bears a cross with an opposite pentagram representing the "Brewer Star", a favoured Carlsberg Breweries symbol. This side of the building also features a niche with a cast bronze sculpture of the Good Shepherd.

== Interior ==
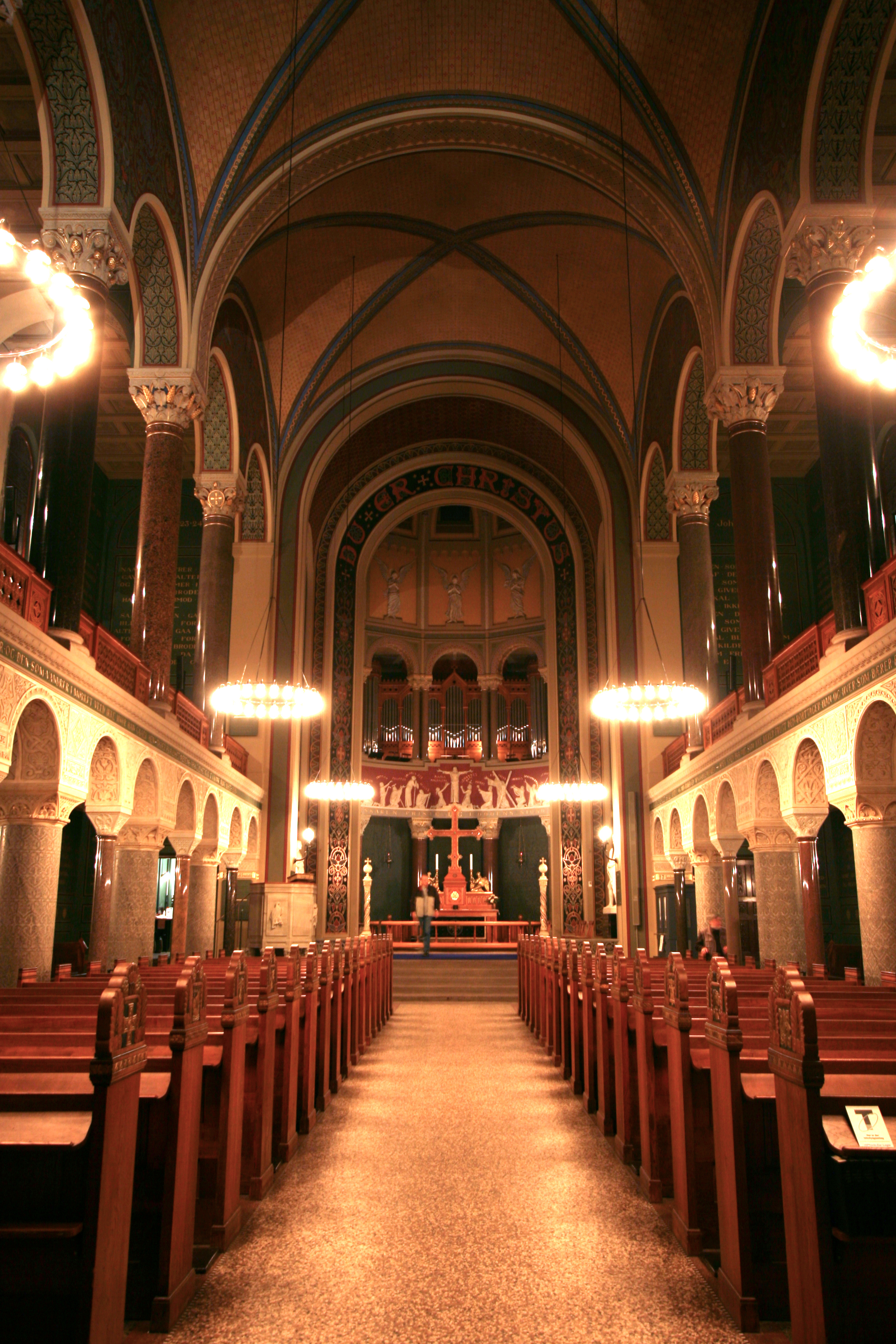
The interior

The nave is flanked by two aisles with galleries borne by eleven pillars on each side. The arches above the galleries are supported by five pillars. The windows behind the galleries are decorated with glass paintings designed by C. N. Overgaard.

The altar features a pentagram. Under the ceiling in the altar chamber runs a frieze depicting inter alia Godfrey of Bouillon and other Templar symbols as well as John the Baptist and Mary Magdalene at the feet of the cross of the crucified Jesus. The church also contains 12 glass mosaics, one of which depicts a horned Moses. The most conspicuous statement in the church is the inscription "You are Christ" painted on the arch leading into the altar chamber.

The chancel is divided into three tiers. The columns rising from the ground bear a gallery with a frieze by Stephan Sinding, Christ among the church's martyrs, fathers and reformers, while windows and sculpted angels decorate the dome above.

On the gallery stands the organ built by the famous French organbuilder Aristide Cavaillé-Coll. The font, designed by Jerichau, is in the shape of a shell. Water trickles into it down a cliff, between the angels of Faith and Hope.

The chancel also contains a memorial to the Jacobsen family, The Angels of Life and Death, the work of Pietro Tenerani based on a sketch by Thorvaldsen. There is also a memorial plaque in the chancel for Jacobsen and his wife Ottilia.

The pulpit, a replacement designed by Mogens Bøggild, was installed in 1934.

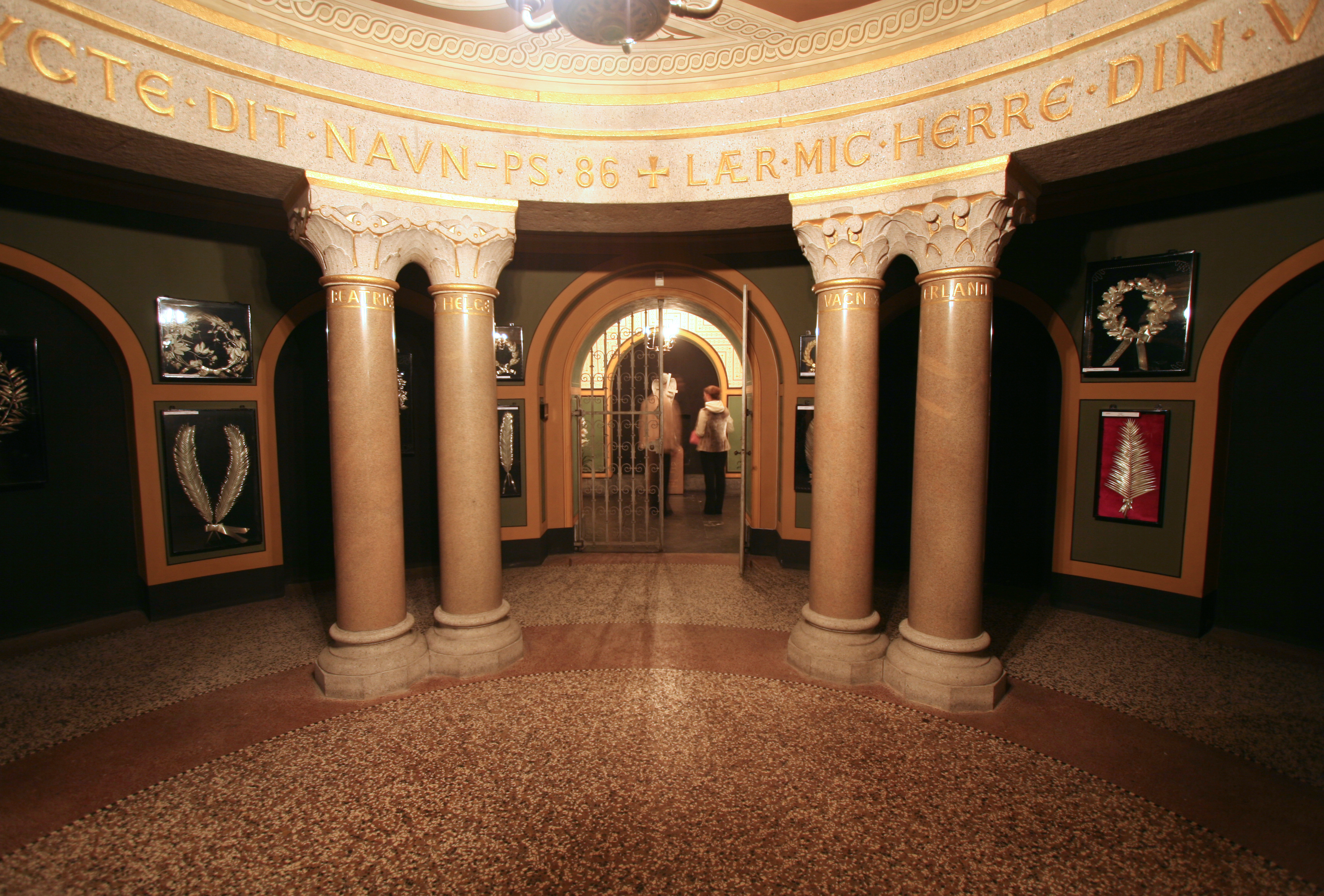
The crypt

== The crypt ==
The church was built as a mausoleum for Carl Jacobsen and his family. In the crypt below the church stand the family's Sarcophages. The campanile also commemorates the Jacobsen family. The four bells in the belfry are each named after one of Carl's four children who died in infancy: Alf, Beatrice, Thorvald and Erland.

== The crucifix and the troll ==
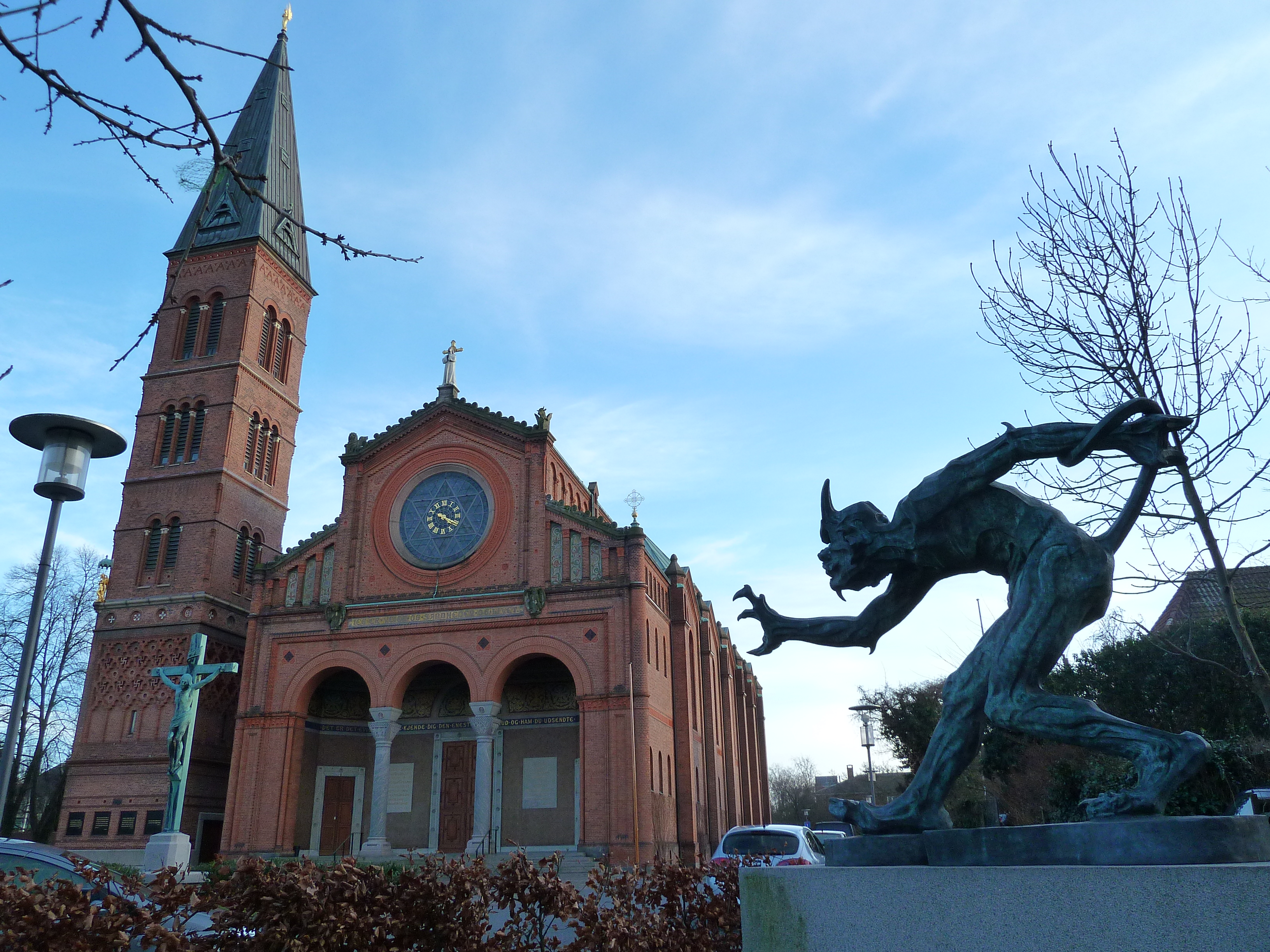
The Troll

The circular flowerbed in front of the church bears Jerichau's crucifix. It replaces a copy of Michelangelo's sculpture Moses from the church San Pietro in Vincoli in Rome that was transferred to the Carlsberg Glyptoteque. Adjacent to the crucifix but just outside the church's perimeter, Jacobsen placed the sculpture Troll that smells Christian blood depicting a fierce-looking troll reaching out for the crucifix. As the tableau proved too controversial for the parish, it was quickly moved to the Glyptoteque garden. In 2002, the church tried to recover the sculpture, but the Glyptoteque would not part with it. A copy was therefore made and placed just in front of the church in its proper place.

== Cultural references ==
- Børge (Jes Holtsø) and Fie (Lene Brøndum) are married in the Jesus Church in the 1978 Olsen-banden film The Olsen Gang Sees Red (1:34:23).
- The Jesus Church is also used as a location in the 1989 film Retfærdighedens rytter.
- The interior of the church is used as location for a funeral in an episode of the DR television series Borgen.

== Gallery ==
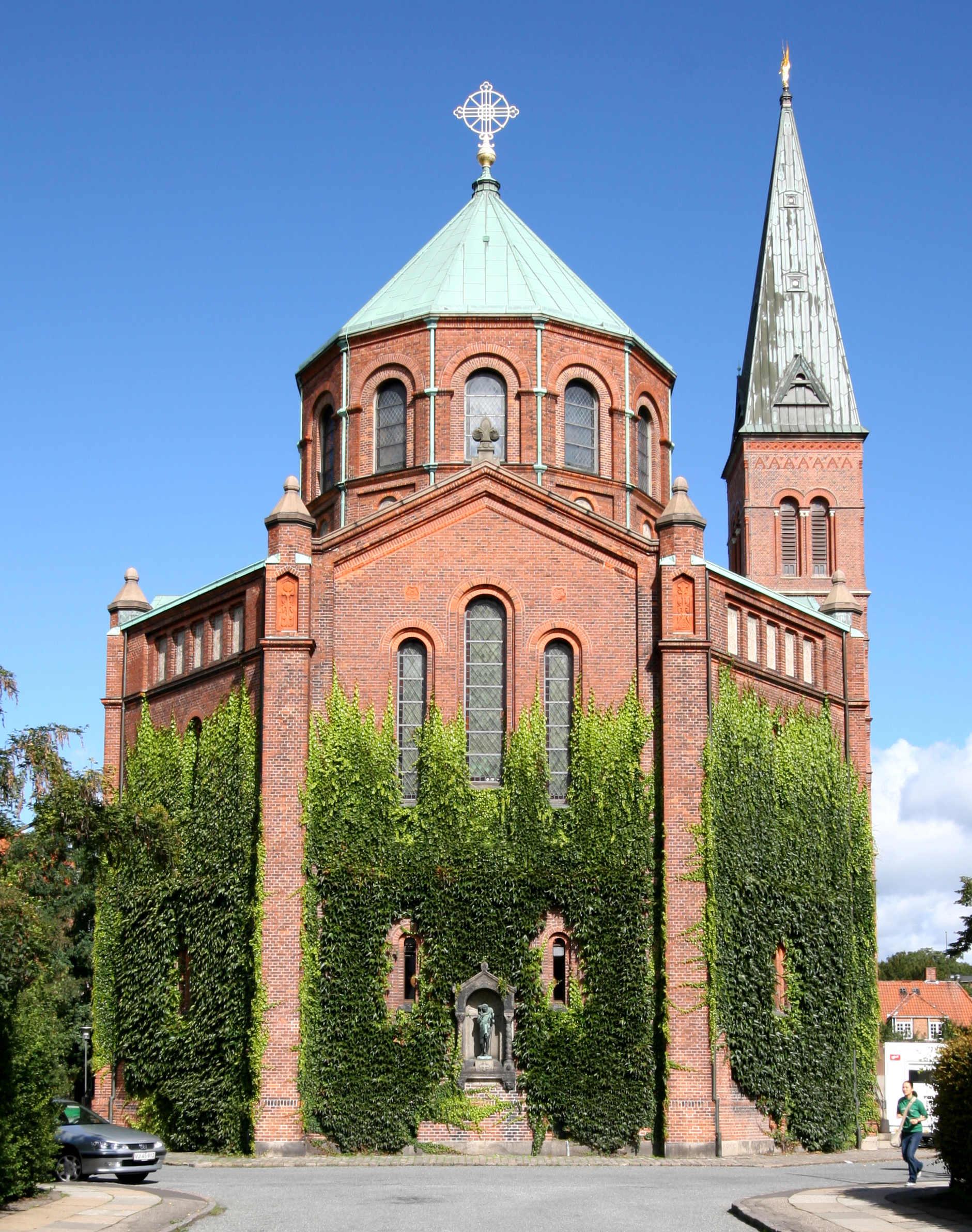
The church from the south

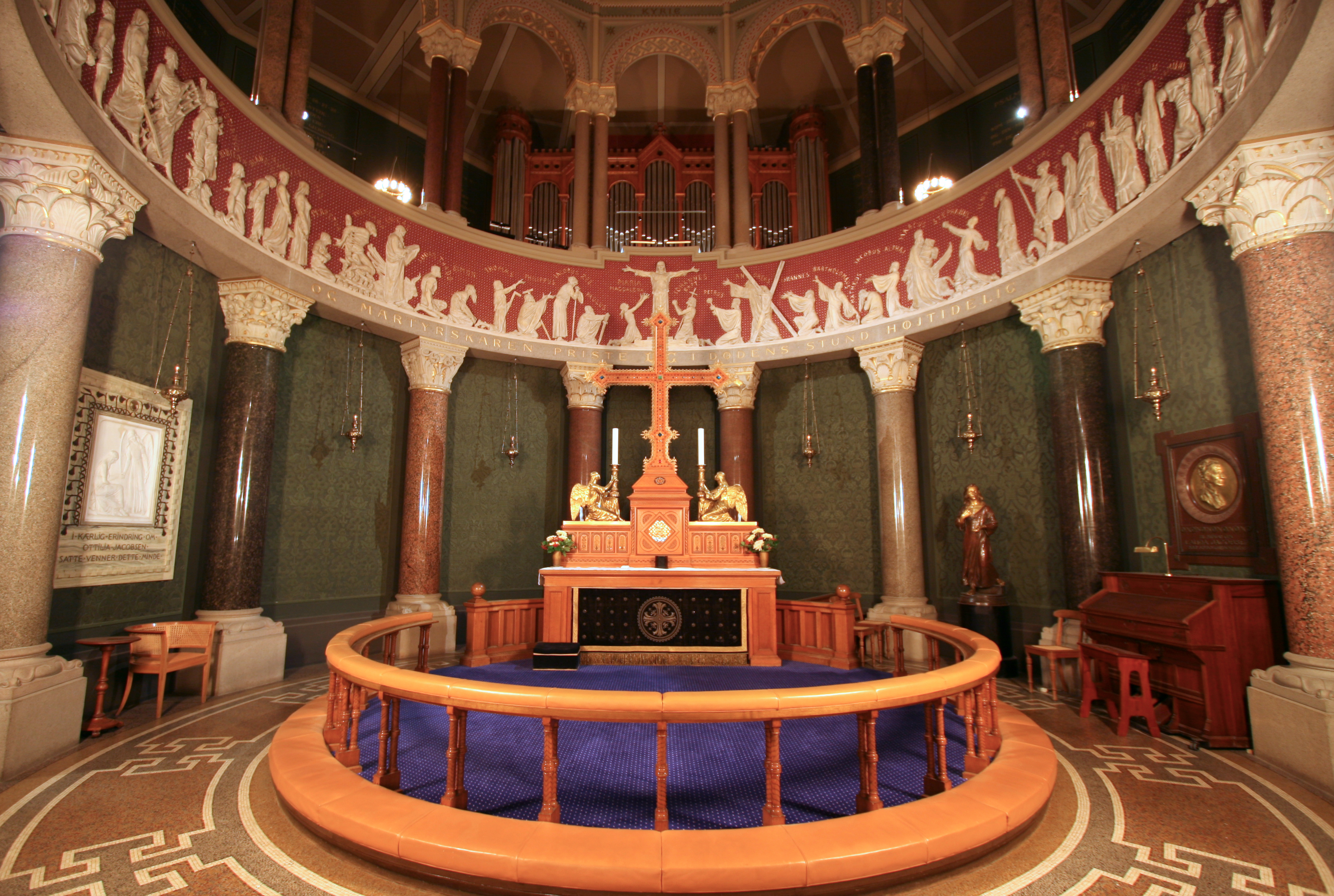
The chancel below the dome

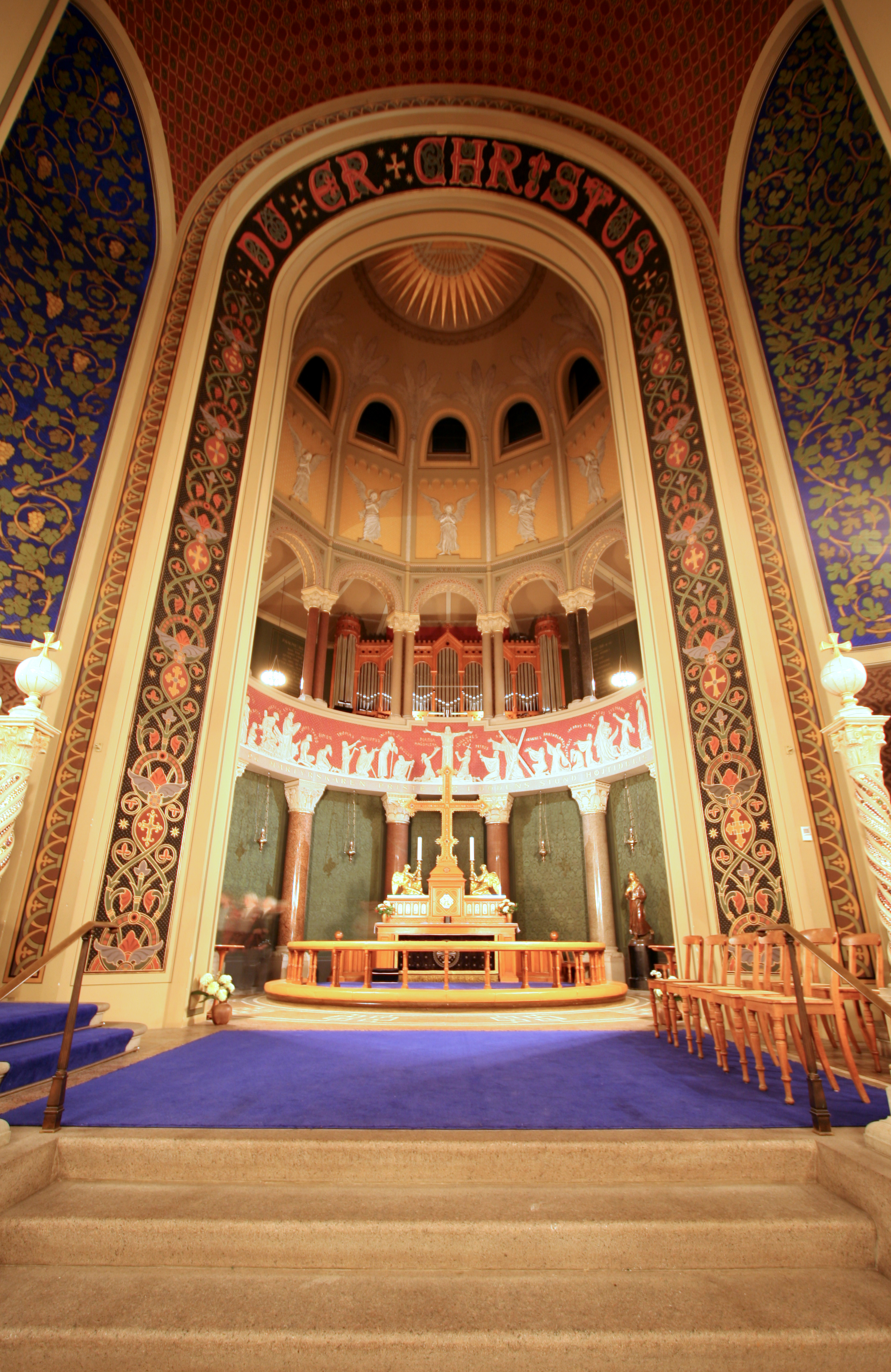
The chancel arch

== See also ==
- Carlsberg District
