= J. C. Jacobsen =

Danish industrialist and philanthropist (1811–1887)

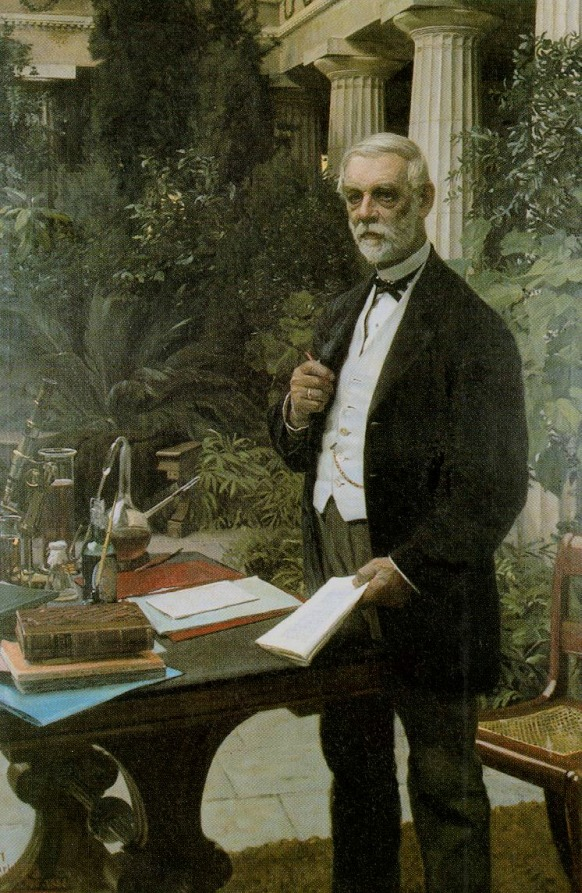
- Portrait by August Jerndorff
- Born: 2 September 1811; Copenhagen, Denmark–Norway
- Died: 30 April 1887 (aged 75); Rome, Kingdom of Italy
- Resting place: The crypt, Jesus Church
- Occupations: Brewer and industrialist
- Known for: As founder of Carlsberg

Jacob Christian Jacobsen (2 September 1811 – 30 April 1887) was a Danish industrialist and philanthropist best known for founding the brewery Carlsberg.

== Biography ==
He had no formal academic or scientific training (although he had attended some lectures by Hans Christian Ørsted). In the 1840s, he had come to realise that production of beer, which had until then been done in numerous small breweries, now had to be based on the scientific method in order to be industrialized.

Starting in 1847, he established his brewery Carlsberg in Valby on the outskirts of Copenhagen, on a site where it has remained since. He named the brewery after his son, Carl Jacobsen. Being extremely vigorous in the pursuit of producing high quality beer, he founded the Carlsberg Laboratory in 1875.

He took much interest in public affairs and supported the National Liberal Party – becoming gradually more conservative – both as a Member of Parliament for some periods between 1854 and 1871 and as a strong supporter of the Danish defense. He served on the Copenhagen City Council from 1843 to 1857. Moreover he was a well-known patron of the arts. After the fire of Frederiksborg Palace in 1859, he funded the reconstruction efforts.

In 1876, Jacobsen founded the Carlsberg Foundation (Carlsbergfondet) which he endowed with a controlling stake in Carlsberg, due to family tensions. A bitter conflict with his son Carl led to the latter's foundation of the Ny Carlsberg (New Carlsberg) Brewery 1882. A reconciliation was however obtained in 1886.

His son Carl Jacobsen collected one of the largest private art collections during his time. It is now housed in the Ny Carlsberg Glyptotek, a museum founded by him in Copenhagen.

== Personal life ==
Jacobsen was married to Laura Cathrine Holst (1819–1911) and was the father of Carl Jacobsen (1842–1919). In 1879, he became an honorary doctor of the University of Copenhagen Faculty of Science and in 1884 he was bestowed Commander 1st class of the Order of the Dannebrog, a Danish order of chivalry.

== See also ==
- Carlsberg Breweries
- Carlsberg Laboratory
- Carlsberg Foundation
- Carlsberg (district)

== Literature ==
- Glamann, Kristof (1991). Jacobsen of Carlsberg. Brewer and Philanthropist. Copenhagen: Gyldendal. ISBN 9788700067936. OCLC 25333676.
