= Entasis (company) =

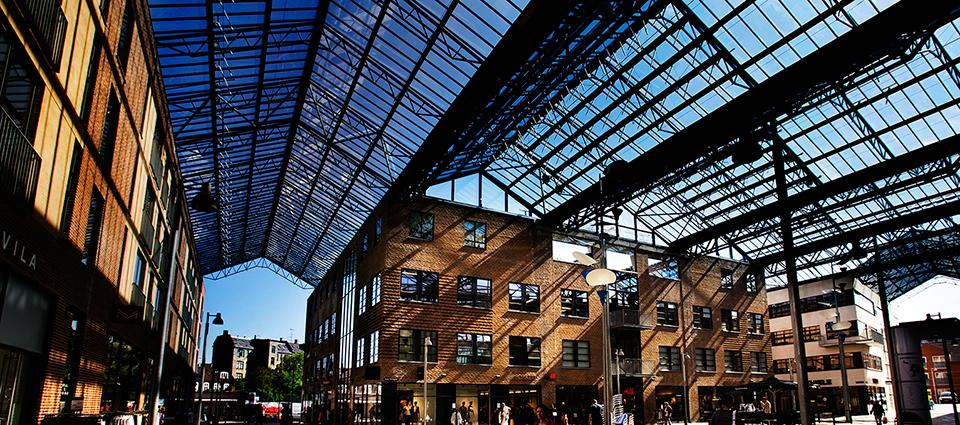
- The Spinning Mill in Copenhagen

Practice information
- Key architects: Christian Cold; Signe Cold
- Founded: 1996
- Location: Copenhagen, Denmark

Significant works and honors
- Buildings: Spinderiet (1997)
- Projects: Carlsberg masterplan

Entasis is a Danish architecture firm based in Copenhagen. It takens its name from the Greek word for tension.

== History ==
Entasis was founded by Christian and Signe Cold in 1996. Their first building, a new main entrance for Copenhagen Zoo, was awarded the AIA Prize 'Best Building in Europe 1998'.

In 2007 the firm won the open international competition for the redevelopment of the former Carlsberg brewery site in Copenhagen, with a proposal which, in reaction to Modernist planning, relied on dense, Medieval town centres for inspiration. An emphasis on physical density and the human scale are characteristic of their work. The same trend is seen in their entry for the Søtorvet competition in Silkeborg which they won in 2010.

== Selected projects ==
- Main entrance, Copenhagen Zoo, Copenhagen (1998)
- Kildeskovshallen, Gentofte, Copenhagen (2000)
- Svanemøllen auditorium building, Danish Defense Academy, Copenhagen (2000)
- 124 houses, Trekroner, Denmark (2002)
- Parish Council building, Riga, Latvia (2003)
- Emaljehaven housing, 2004
- 50+ housing, Ørestad, Copenhagen (2005)
- Carlsberg masterplan, Copenhagen (2007)
- Spinderiet, Valby, Copenhagen (2007)
- Søtorvet masterplan, Silkeborg, Denmark (2010)

== Awards ==
- 1998 AIA Prize for Copenhagen Zoo main entrance
- 2006 Eckersberg Medal
- 2009 WAF Award (Future projects: Masterplanning category) for Carlsberg masterplan
- 2009 Nykredit Architecture Prize
