= Carlsberg Foundation =

Danish not-for-profit organization

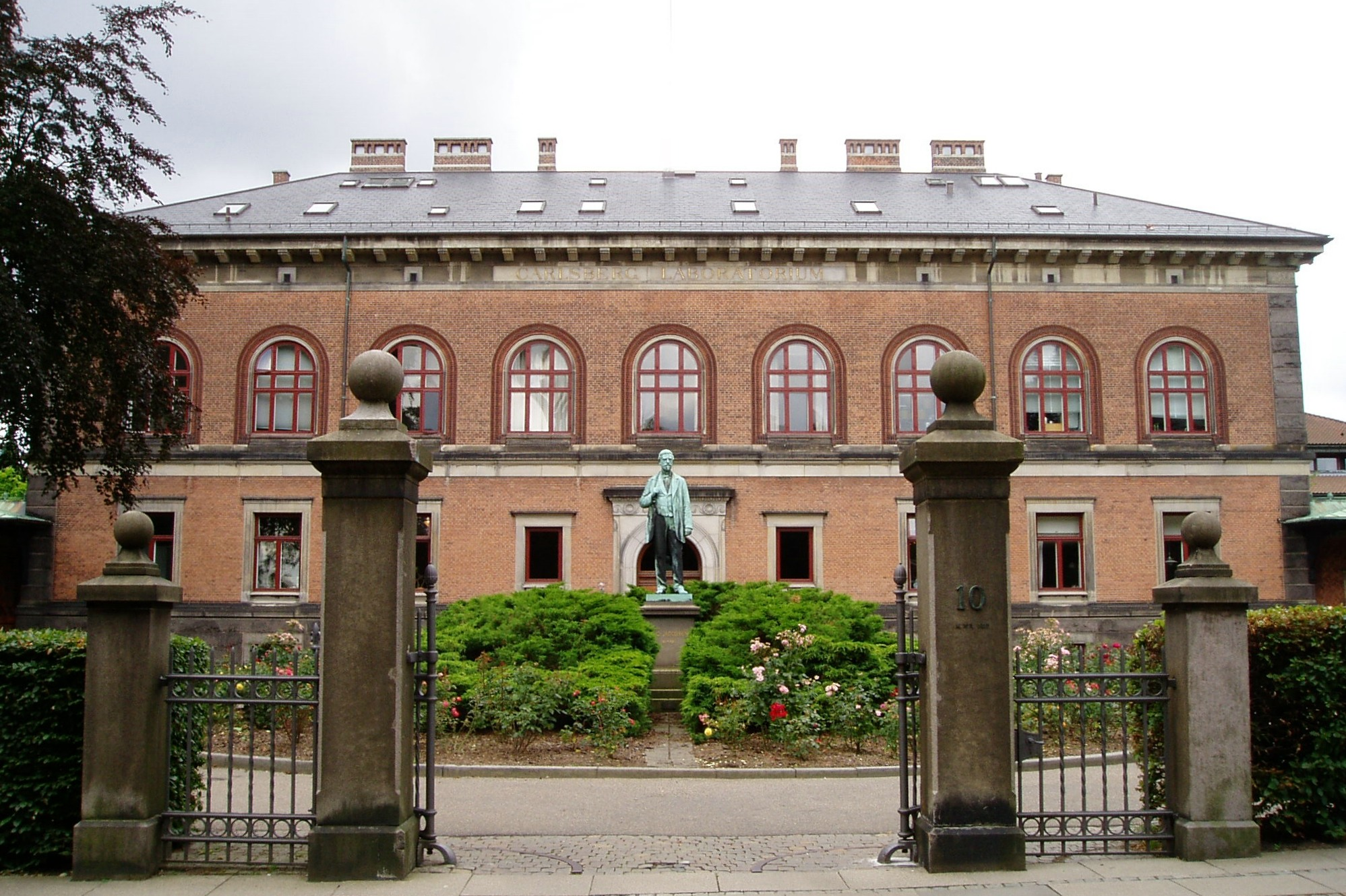
The Carlsberg Laboratory and in the foreground a statue of its founder J.C. Jacobsen.

Carlsberg Foundation (Danish: Carlsbergfondet) is a Danish not-for-profit organization that was founded by J. C. Jacobsen in 1876, by allocating some of his shares in the Carlsberg Brewery to fund and operate the Carlsberg Laboratory and the Museum of National History at Frederiksborg Palace. The foundation has since expanded to fund scientific research, and via the Tuborg Foundation to fund social works.

== History ==
The foundation was started to run Carlsberg Laboratory. To finance its works the foundation received a portion of shares in Carlsberg Brewery. J.C. Jacobsen's wish was to create a foundation with firm obligations to the natural sciences and direct responsibility for the running of a corporate enterprise. In 1878 the foundation started to manage and fund the Museum of National History at Frederiksborg Palace. In 1887 after the death of J. C. Jacobsen the foundation inherited the remaining shares in the brewery. In 1902 Carl Jacobsen (J. C. Jacobsen's son) started the "New Carlsberg Foundation" to run his brewery, New Carlsberg. When the old and new Brewery merged, the obligations of New Carlsberg Foundation were added to those of the Carlsberg foundation, including the management and funding of Ny Carlsberg Glyptotek. In 1931 the foundation started a Scholarship programme named after J. C. Jacobsen. The foundation sponsored the Danish excavation of Tell Shemshara in Iraq in 1957. In 1991 the foundation took over the responsibilities of the "Tuborg Foundation", after Carlsberg acquired Tuborg brewery in 1970.

== Relations to Carlsberg Brewery ==
In 1887 at the death of J. C. Jacobsen the foundation inherited the remaining shares in Carlsberg Brewery, the testament stated that the foundation shall always at least own 51% of the brewery. In May 2007 the Danish Foundation Oversight Authority approved that the interpretation of the rules to mean that the foundation should own at least 25% of the capital assets of the brewery and 51% of the voting shares. The shares in Carlsberg are divided into two classes, where the A-class has twenty votes per share and the B-class has two votes per share.

As of 31 December 2024 it owned 29.63% of the share capital the Carlsberg Group and controlled 77.25% of the voting power.

== See also ==
- 5890 Carlsberg, an asteroid named in honour of the foundation on the occasion of the 150 years anniversary of J.C. Jacobsen's visit to Munich.
- Carlsberg Fjord, named after the foundation by Arctic explorer Georg Carl Amdrup in 1898–1900.
- Carlsbergfondet Land, named at the time of the 1912–13 Danish Expedition to Queen Louise Land led by J.P. Koch.
- Carlsberg Meridian Telescope, the first automated meridian instrument, funded by the foundation and operational from 1984 to 2013
- Carlsberg Ridge, subsea canyon in the Indian Ocean, discovered by the second Dana expedition (1928-32), funded by the foundation.
