= De Danske Bomuldsspinderier =

Danish textile mill company

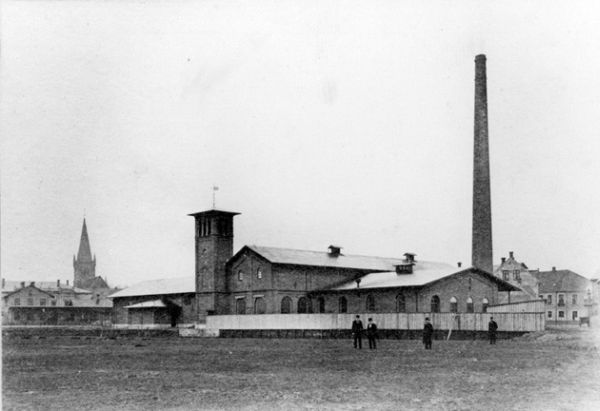
Vejle Cotton Mill in 1892

De Danske Bomuldsspinderier (English: The Danish Cotton Mills) is a defunct Danish company which operated textile mills in Vejle, Jutland, and Valby, Copenhagen. Production stopped in 2000 and both production sites have since been redeveloped.

== History ==
The company traced its history back to 1892 when Marius Windfeld-Hansen founded Vejle Cotton Mill in Vejle, Denmark. In 1901, the company was merged with Vejle Cotton Factory, also in Vejle, and the Mogensen Mill in Odense. In 1906, it changed its name to Danish Cotton Mills and the following year the production site in Odense was closed and replaced with a modern cotton mill in Valby, then a suburb of Copenhagen. The new mill was designed by Alfred Thomsen and constructed from 1906 to 1907.

By the 1950s, the production of cotton was no longer as profitable in Denmark and the Valby plant eventually closed. In 1978, the company was sold to the businessman Jan Bonde Nielsen and after his bankruptcy in 1980 it survived as a division in the Copenhagen-based textiles company B.W. Wernerfelt-Hansen. The production site in Vejle closed in 2000 as the last Danish cotton mill.

== The Danish Cotton Mills sites today ==
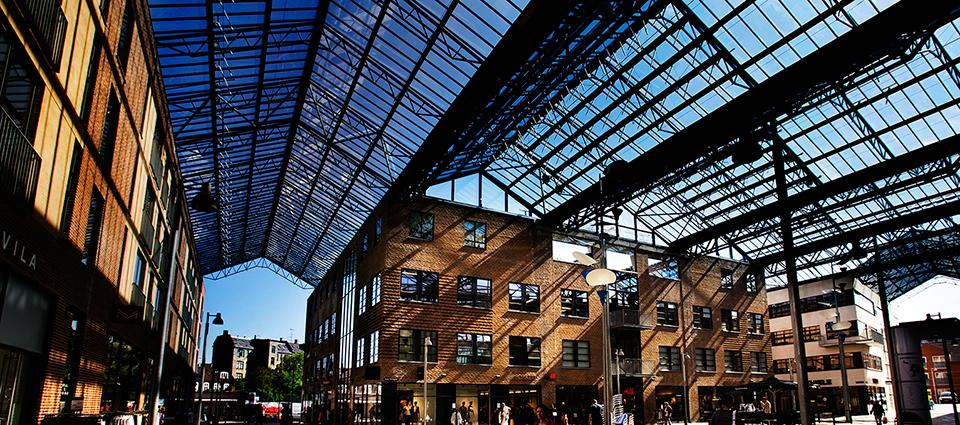
Spinderiet in Valby, Copenhagen

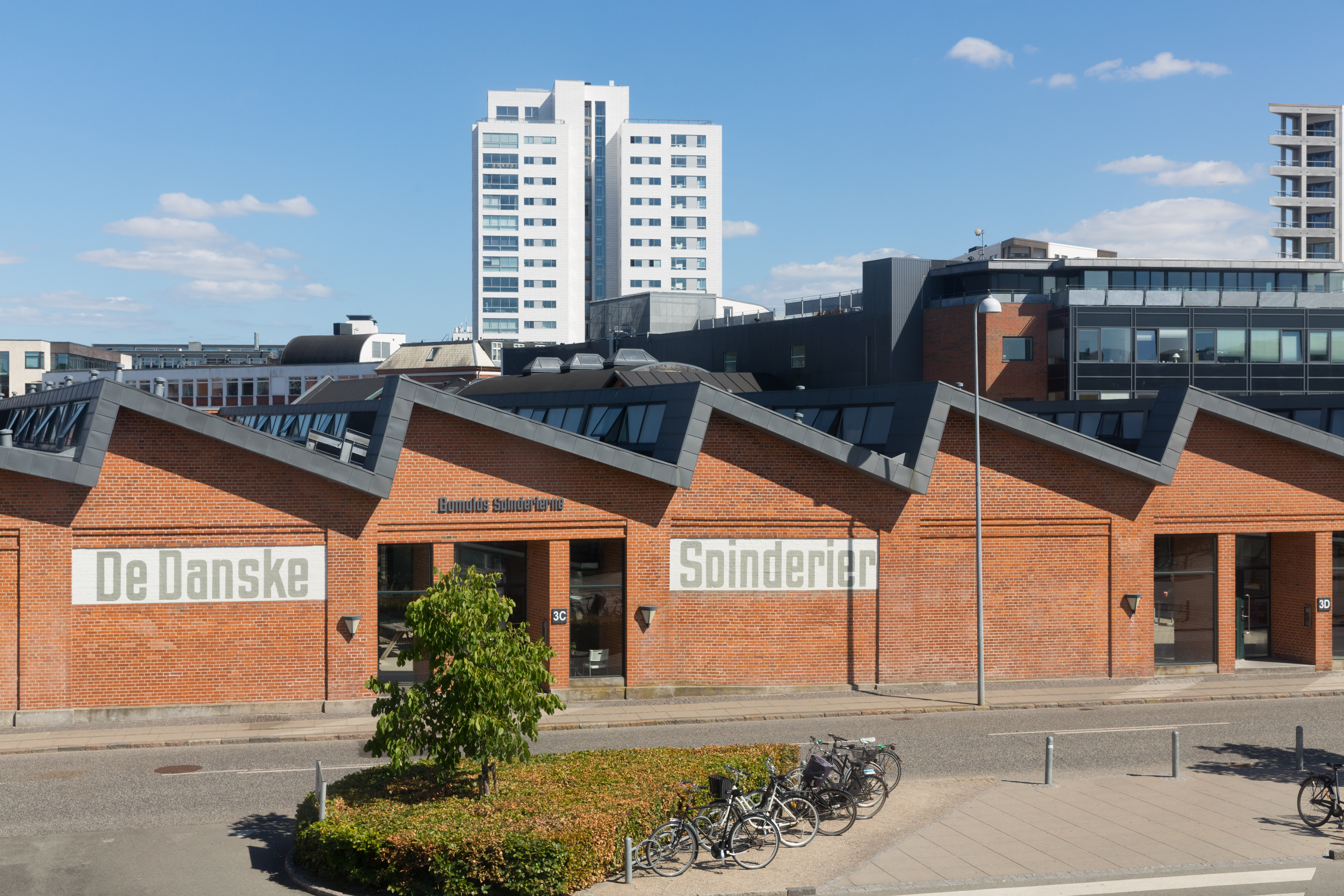
The redeveloped site in Vejle.

Both of the former production sites of the company have been redeveloped. The Valby site has been converted into Spinderiet, a mixed-use development inaugurated in 2007 which combines a shopping centre, office space and apartments. The factory in Vejle has also been redeveloped and now houses various cultural institutions and companies.
