= Carl Jacobsen =

Danish brewer, art collector and philanthropist

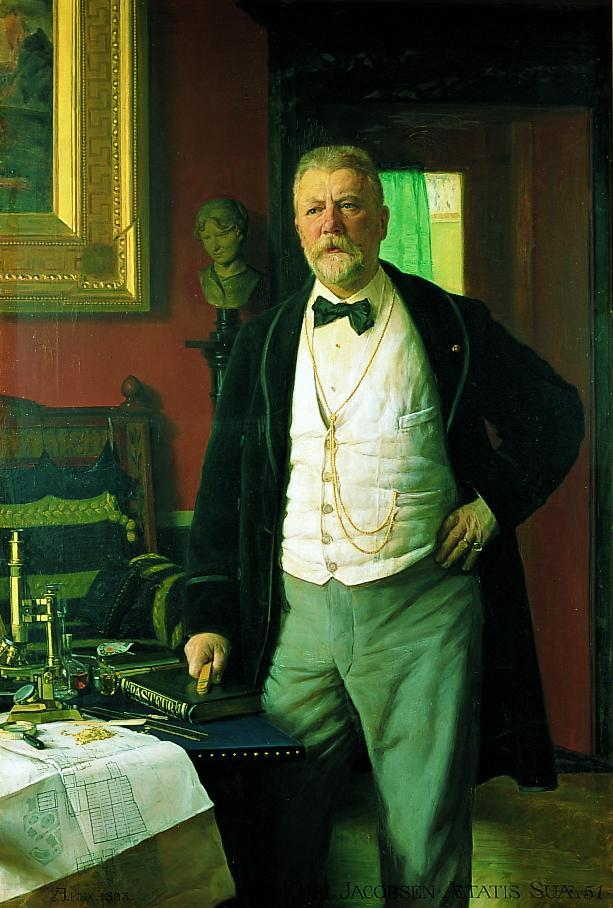
- Carl Jacobsen painted by August Jerndorff (1893)
- Born: Carl Christian Hillmann Jacobsen; 2 March 1842; Copenhagen, Denmark
- Died: 11 January 1914 (aged 71); Frederiksberg, Denmark
- Resting place: Jesus Church, Copenhagen
- Father: J. C. Jacobsen

Carl Christian Hillman Jacobsen (2 March 1842 – 11 January 1914) was a Danish brewer, art collector and philanthropist. Though often preoccupied with his cultural interests, Jacobsen was a shrewd and visionary businessman and initiated the transition of the brewery Carlsberg from a local Copenhagen brewery to the multinational conglomerate that it is today.

== Background ==
Carl Jacobsen was born in Copenhagen, Denmark. He was the son of J. C. Jacobsen (1811-1887), who founded the brewery Carlsberg. After 1861, he became a student from the Borgerdyd School in Christianshavn. From 1866, he conducted a four year study trip to the leading breweries abroad.

== Career ==
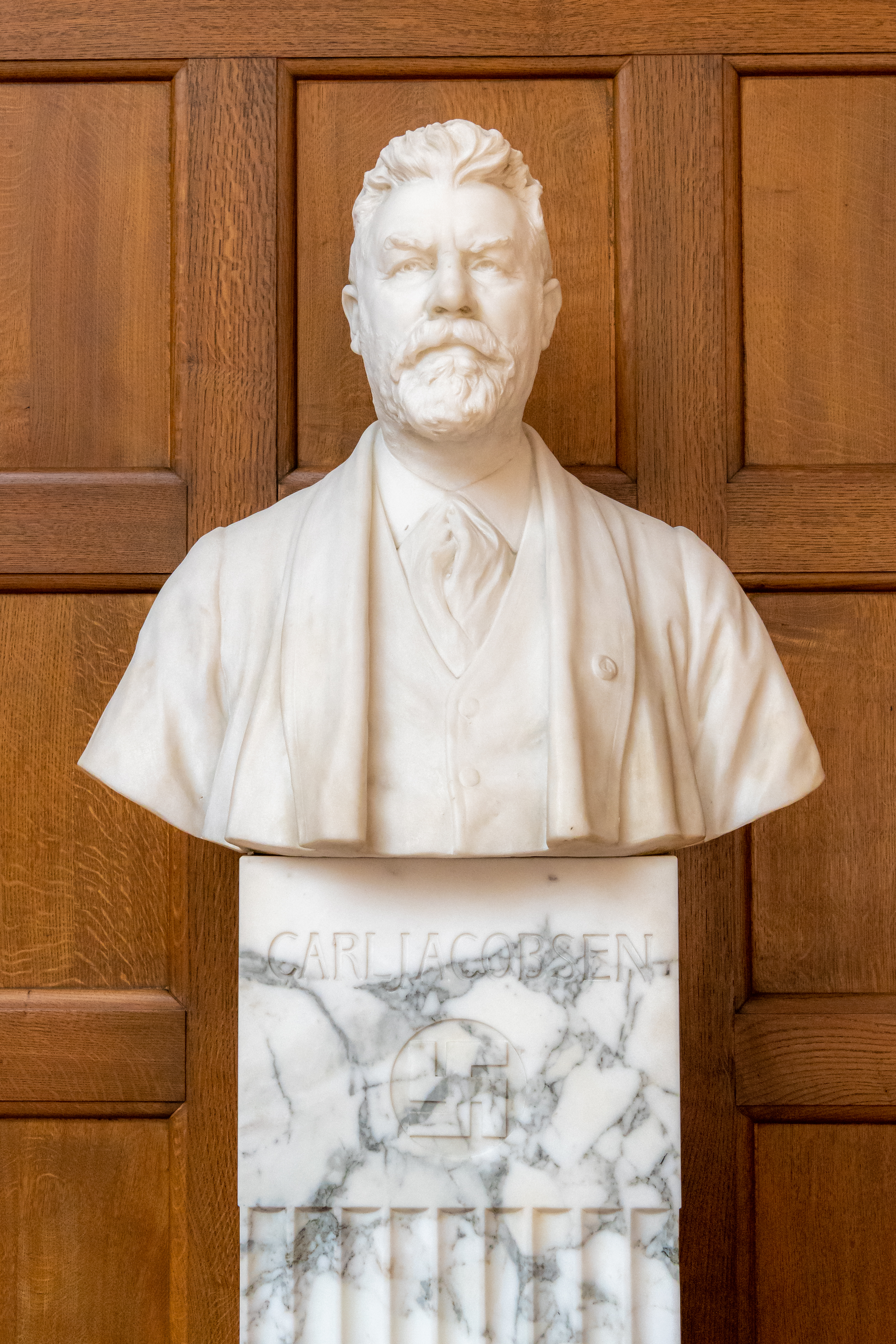
Bust of Carl Jacobsen in Copenhagen City Hall

Jacobsen worked for his father but partly because of his conflicts between them, he founded his own brewery in 1882. It was first named Valby Brewery but upon his father's approval changed its name to Ny Carlsberg (English: New Carlsberg), while his father's enterprise at the same occasion changed its name to Gammel Carlsberg (English: Old Carlsberg). At his father's death, Carl Jacobsen did not at once obtain the leading post of the old brewery. Instead his father left it to the Carlsberg Foundation (Carlsbergfondet) which he had founded in 1876. In 1906 the two Carlsberg breweries merged and Carl Jacobsen was CEO of Carlsberg. As a "sole ruler" he carried on his father’s work.

== Artistic interest and philanthropy ==
Carl Jacobsen did not share his father's political commitment, though like him he was an eager cultural enthusiast known for his interest in Greek and classical art and his engagement led to the founding of the Ny Carlsberg Glyptotek in 1897, an art museum mainly based upon his Antique collections still regarded as one of the most important Danish art museums.

Carl Jacobsen's interest in the arts is also demonstrated by his brewery. He employed the leading Danish architects of the time, mainly Vilhelm Dahlerup, and the buildings were designed with great care to detail as seen in the Winding Chimney.

Often taking part in discussions of architecture of Copenhagen, he paid for the restoration of several churches and public buildings and was also behind the 1913 sculpture The Little Mermaid.

== Personal life ==
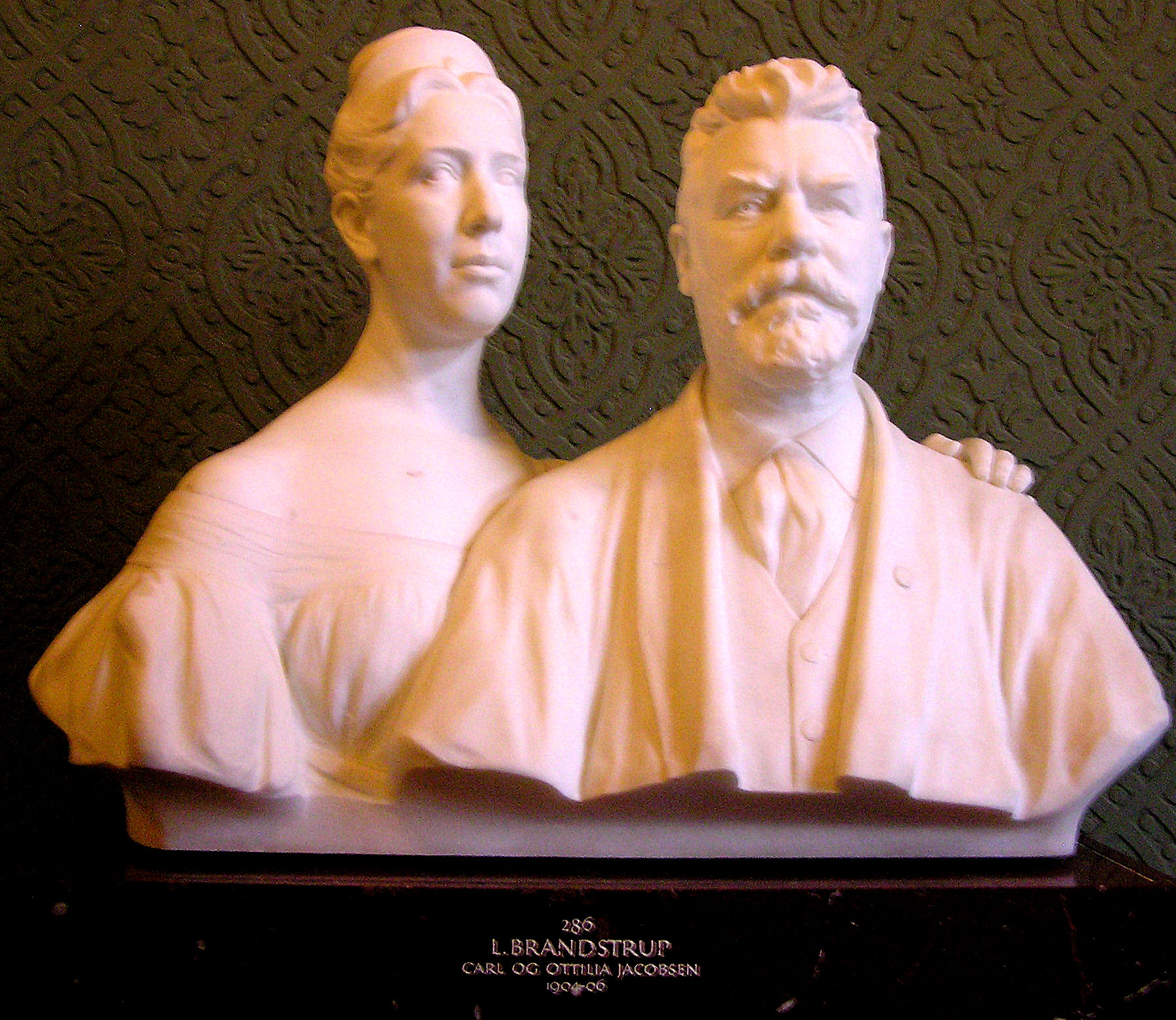
Carl Jacobsen and wife Ottilia at the Ny Carlsberg Glyptotek

Jacobsen met his wife Ottilia Marie Jacobsen née Stegmann (3 October 1854 – 20 July 1903) during a business trip to Edinburgh, Scotland. They were married in Copenhagen on 24 September 1874. Ottilia was the daughter of the Danish grain merchant Lorents Konrad Carl Stegmann (a.k.a. Conrad Stegmann) and Margrethe Louise Marie née Brummer. She was almost as famous as Jacobsen within the contemporary arts community in Denmark. They were the parents of nine children born between 1875 and 1890.

Jacobsen became an extraordinary member of the Royal Danish Academy of Fine Arts (1897), honorary member of the Société des artistes français (1909), member (associé) of the Académie des Beaux-Arts (1913), Knight of the Order of the Dannebrog (1888), Dannebrogsmand (1891), Commander of the 2nd degree (1897) and of 1st degree 1906 and received the Grand Cross (1912). Carl Jacobsen died 11 January 1914 and was buried in the family mausoleum at Jesus Church, Copenhagen.

== See also ==
- Carlsberg (district)
- Carl Jacobsen House
