= Spinderiet =

Shopping centre in Copenhagen, Denmark

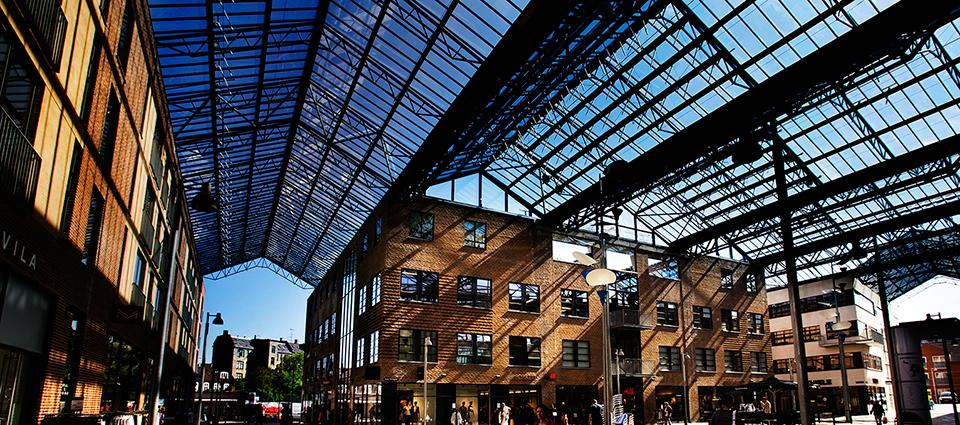
- Spinderiet, the glass roof
- Location: Valby, Copenhagen, Denmark
- Coordinates: 55°39′54″N 12°30′38″E
- Opened: 15 November 2007
- Developer: TK Development
- Architect: Alfred Thomsen (old); AK83 Arkitekter (adaptation and new)
- Num. of stores: 50
- Floor area: 19,000 m^{2} (200,000 sq ft)
- Floors: 4
- Parking: Multi-story car park (500 spaces)
- Website: spinderiet.dk

Spinderiet (lit. 'The Spinning Mill') is a shopping centre located next to Valby station in the Valby district of Copenhagen, Denmark. Inaugurated in 2008, it incorporates the converted buildings of a cotton mill from 1907. The mixed use development also contains office space and apartments.

== History ==
=== The cotton mill ===
The converted cotton mill was originally built from 1905 to 1907 by Danish Cotton Factories, a now defunct company which traced its history back to 1892 when Marius Windfeld-Hansen founded Vejle Cotton Mill in Vejle. In 1901 the company was merged with Vejle Cotton Factory, also in Vejle, and the Mogensen Mill in Odense. In 1906 it changed its name to the Danish Cotton Mills. The following year, the production site in Odense was closed, replaced by the new cotton mill in Valby which was constructed from 1906 to 1907 to the design of Alfred Thomsen.

=== Later history ===
By the late 1950s, production of cotton was no longer a profitable business in Valby and the factory closed in the early 1980s. The buildings were taken over by local craftsmen, two chocolate manufacturers and a retail shop.

In the early 2000s it was decided to redevelop the site. In 2004 the plans were unanimously approved by the Copenhagen City Council. The architectural practice AK83 Arkitekter was charged with the assignment, and the shopping centre was inaugurated on 15 November 2007. The architecture was praised for a modern overhaul of the old cotton mill.

== Spinderiet today ==
The development consists of the old industrial buildings, now adapted, and five new buildings. It combines a traditional, indoor shopping centre and a street level, outdoor shopping street, partly covered by a glass canopy and opening onto a large central space.

Apart from the retail area, the development also includes 4,000 m^{2} (43,000 sq ft) of office space and 12,500 m^{2} (135,000 sq ft) of apartments (mixed condominiums and flats).
