= Brolæggerstræde 5 =

Listed building in Copenhagen

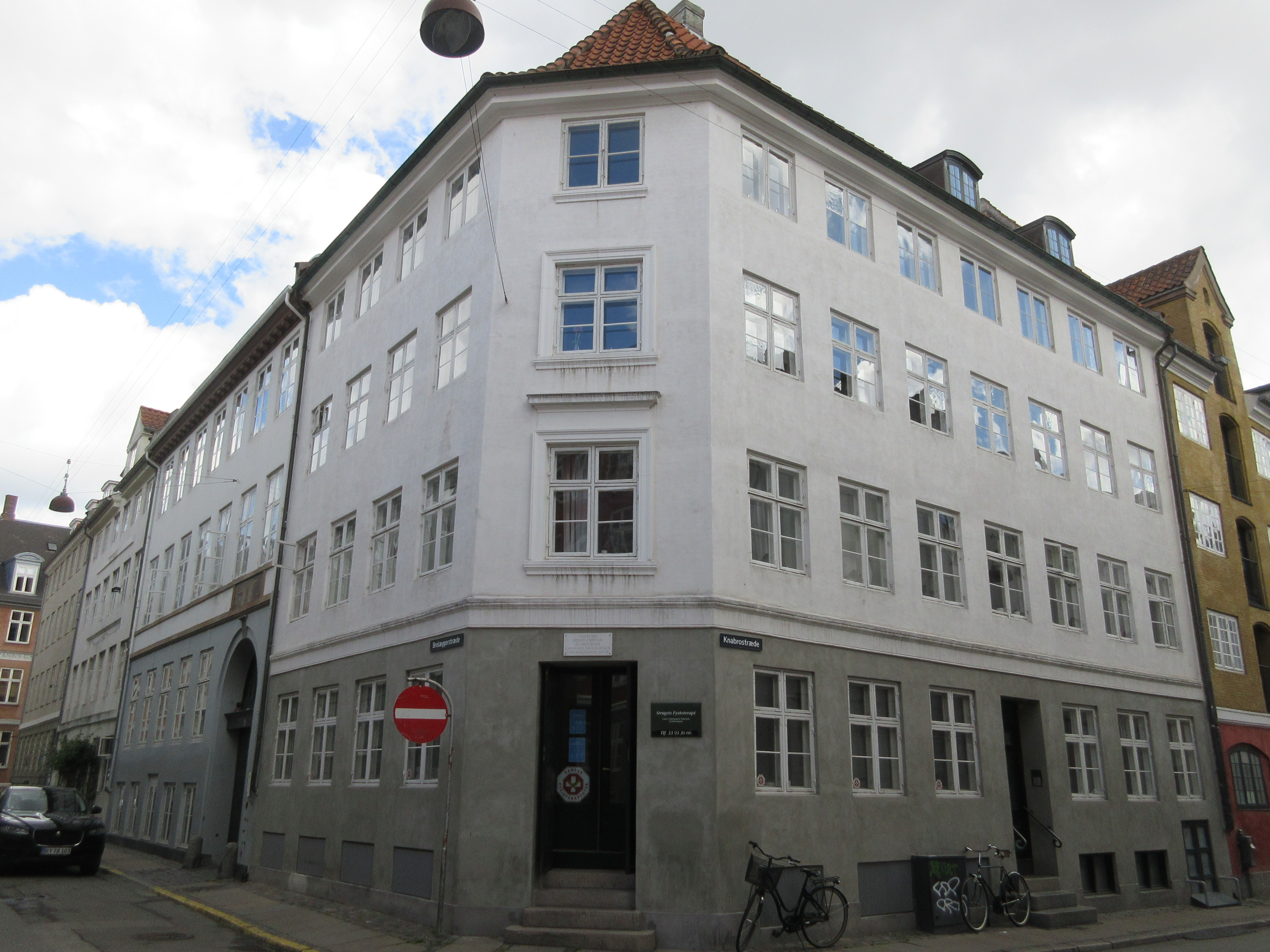
- Interactive map of the Brolæggerstræde 5 area

General information
- Location: Copenhagen. Denmark, Denmark
- Coordinates: 55°40′39.72″N 12°34′30.04″E
- Completed: 1796-1799

Brolæggerstræde, also known as J. C. Jacobsens Bryggergård, was the location of Carlsberg-founder J. C. Jacobsen's first brewery in Copenhagen, Denmark. He kept the property after inaugurating his new Carlsberg Brewery in Valby in 1847 and building an extravagant new home next to it in 1854. A commemorative plaque above the gate commemorates that J. C. Jacobsen's son Carl Jacobsen was born in the building in 1842 and that J. C. Jacobsen undertook his first experiments with the brewing of lager beer on the site in 1838.

The property comprises a five-storey brewery building in the courtyard as well as a four-storey apartment building and a former warehouse around the corner at Knabrostræde 11–13. The entire complex was constructed as part of the rebuilding of the city following the Copenhagen Fire of 1795. It was listed on the Danish registry of protected buildings and places in 1945. The property is now owned by the Carlsberg Foundation and the Ny Carlsberg Foundation is based in the brewery building in the courtyard.

Other notable former residents include the writer Thomas Christopher Bruun, composer Friedrich Ludwig Æmilius Kunzen, theologian Jens Møller and architect Johan Daniel Herholdt.

The adjacent corner building Knabrostræde 9 was also listed in 1045 and is also owned by the Carlsberg Foundation. A commemorative plaque on the chamfered corner commemoraties that J. C. Jacobsen was born in the building in 1811.

== History ==
=== 18th century ===
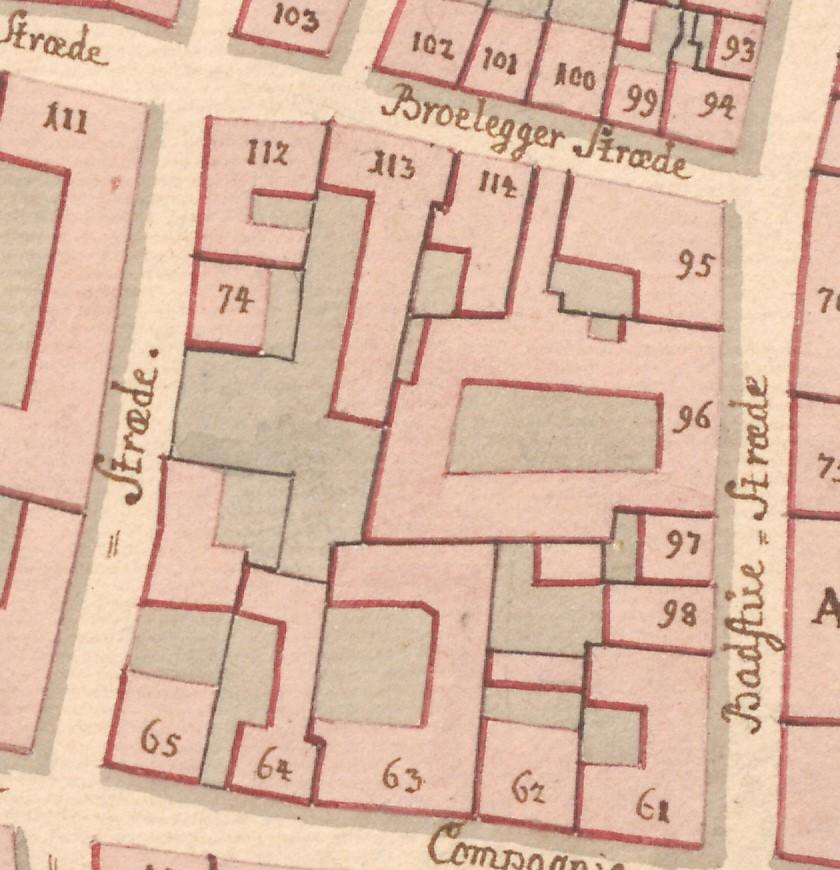
No.112, No. 113 and No. 74 seen in a detail from Christian Gedde's map of Snaren's Quarter, 1757

The site was formerly made up of a number of smaller properties. The corner property was listed in Copenhagen's first cadastre of 1689 as No. 131 in Snaren's Quarter. It was owned by vinegar manufacturer Niels Pedersen at that time. The property was listed in the new cadastre of 1756 as No. 112 in Snaren's Quarter. It was owned by grocer (urtekræmmer) Nikolaj Christensen at that time. The adjacent property in Brolæggerstræde was as No. 113 owned by brewer Lorentz Jensen Smidt. Schmidt's property had previously been part of two properties, listed in the old cadastre of 1689 as No. 76 and No. 132. The adjacent property in Knabrostræde was listed in the new cadastre of 1756 as No. 74 and belonged to carpenter Ole Hansen Lund. His property was the result of the merger of the old No. 85 and No. 86.

No. 113 belonged to brewer Nicolaj Rindom at the time of the 1787 census. He lived there with his second wife Anne Catrine Hallers, their two children (aged one and 10), one brewery worker (bryggersvend), one brewer's apprentice (bryggerknægt), one caretaker, two maids and the lodger Franz Hvass (senior clerk in Rentekammeret).

No. 112 belonged to grocer (urtekræmmer) Johan Casse, a son of brewer and soap manufacturer in Christianshavn Peter Casse.Casse's property was home to two households at the 1787 census. Casse resided in the building with his wife Juliane Birgitte Bredstrup, a grocer (urtekræmmersvend, employee), two grocer's apprentices, a coachman, three maids and the lodger B. Limpricht (merchant from the Danish West Indies). Gertra, Israels Asche Una's widow, resided in the building with her sister-in-law Caroline Wolf (née Una), Wolf's nine-year-old sonJoseph Wolf and Wolf's maid.

No. 74 was home to 10 residents in three households at the 1787 census. Jørgen Rasch, a tailor, resided in the building with his wife Maren Mads Datter. Thomas Kisbye, a clerk employed by undertaker Møller, resided in the building with two maids. Thomas Nielsen, a flour merchant, resided in the building with his wife Anne Lars Datter and one maid.

=== Nicolai Rindum and the new building ===
The three properties were all destroyed in the Copenhagen Fire of 1795, together with most of the other buildings in the area. The new building at No. 113 was constructed for Rindum in 1796–1797. He had also pyrchased No. 74 (before or after the fire) and used it for the construction of two storage buildings. The present corner building was constructed by Ernst Burmeister in 1799–1800.

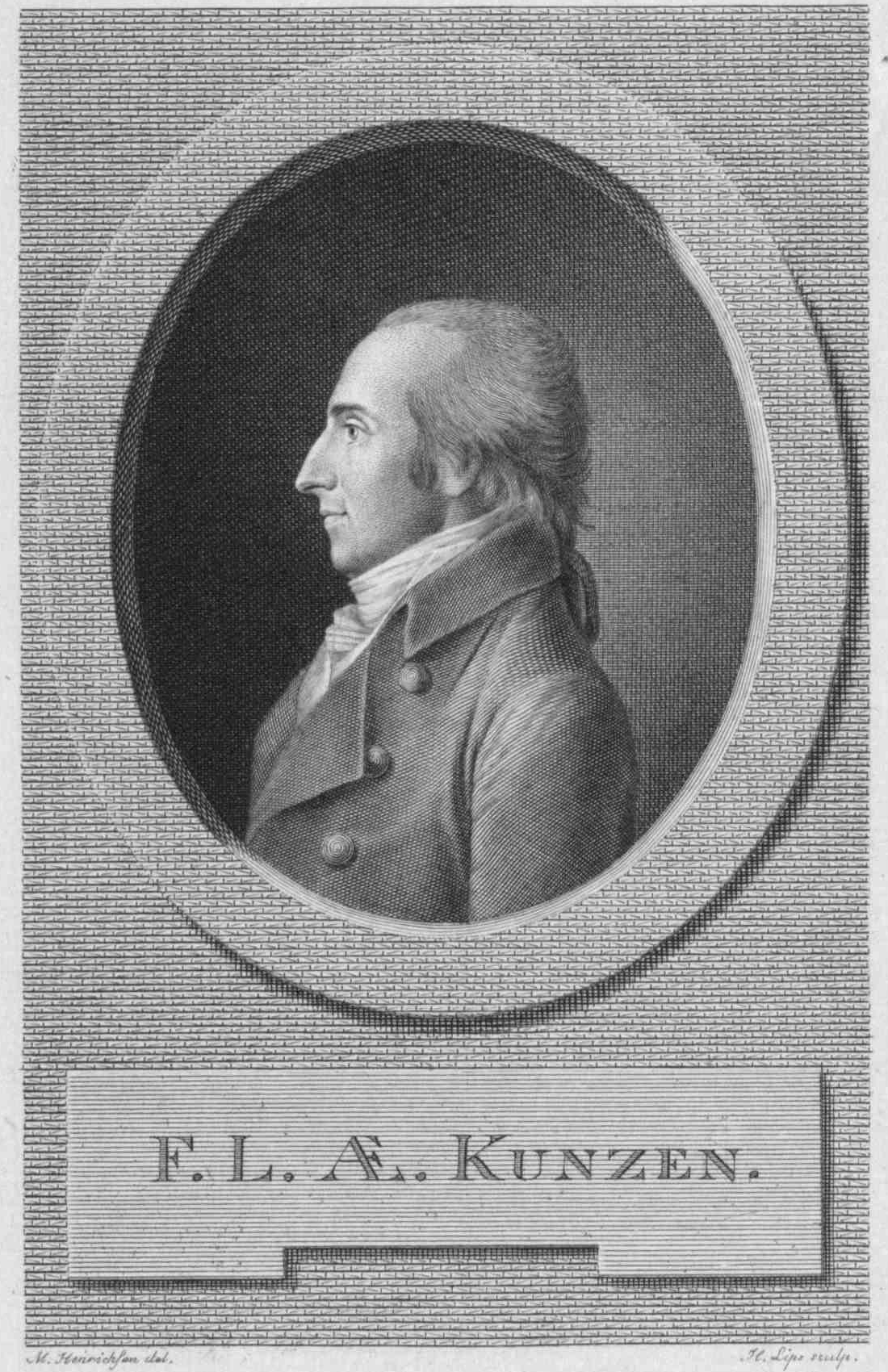
Friedrich Ludwig Aemilius Kunzen

No. 113 was home to 25 residents in four households at the 1801 census. Nicolai Rindum resided in the building with his wife, their 15-year-old daughter Cathrine Rindum, the wife's six-year-old niece Sophie Diderichsen, a maid, a female cook, a brewery worker, a brewer's apprentice and a caretaker. Peder Christensen Langebeck, a grocer/butcher (spækhøker), resided in the basement with his wife Kirstine Marie Kansler, their three children (aged nine to 11) and one maid. Friedrich Ludwig Æmilius Kunzen, musical director of the Royal Danish Orchestra, resided in the building with his wife Johanna Margaretha Antonetta Zuccarini (1766-1842), their two sons (aged one and three) and two maids. Thomas Christopher Bruun, a lecturer and writer, resided in the building with his wife Sophie Elisabeth Thorup, their 14-year-old son Carl Julius Bruun and one maid. No. residents were recorded at No. 74 in 1801.

No. 112 was home to 43 residents in 10 households at the 1801 census. Temperentia Uttendahl (née Hiort), a widow, resided in the building with her two children (aged eight and 12), her younger half sister Lorentze Soelberg and one maid. Falck Marcus Valentin /1765-1852), a merchant (grosserer), resided in the building with his wife Amalia Cohen (1765–1818), their five children (aged one to 18, the eldest from the wife's first marriage) and one maid. Hans Severin Holten, Prince Christian Frederik's tutor in the natural sciences, resided in the building with his wife Juliane Marie Holten, their two-year-old daughter Margrethe Cathrine Holten and one maid. Peter Martin Voigt, a clerk, resided in the building with his wife Elisabeth Voigt, their one-year-old son Carl Anton Voigt, their five-year-old foster daughter Lovise Augusta Gehrtz and one maid. Peter Wilhelm Izeling (possibly Iselin), a forskærer, resided in the building with his wife Marie Dorthea Kiefner and one maid. Marthe Moses, a Jewish widow, resided in the building with her five children (aged six to 16) and the lodger Johanne Salomon (widow). Lorentz Juhl, a merchant, resided in the building with his wife Karen Kirstine Hansen and the wife's sister Elsebeth Margrethe Hansen. Jeppe Jeppesen Steenberg, a cook employed by the Danish Asiatic Company, resided in the building with his wife Marie Elisabeth Steenberg and their five-year-old son Jacob Jeppesen Steenberg. Christiane Møller, the wife's miother, was also a resident of the building. Inglatze Erleweil, a brcik-layer, resided in the basement with his wife Teresia Lutz, their two-year-old son Johan Sebastian Erleweil and one lodger (carpenter).

The old No. 113 was listed in the new cadaste of 1806 as No. 76 in Snaren's Quarter and belonged to Eindum's widow at that time. The old No. 74 was listed as No. 115 and was also still owned by Rindum's widow. The old No. 112 was listed in the new cadastre of 1806 as No. 75 in Snaren's Quarter. The property was owned by Ludvig Caus at that time.

The theologian Jens Møller (1779-1833) resided in one of the apartments from 1812 to 1826. He had just been appointed as professor at the University of Copenhagen and became a Doctor of Theology in 1816.

=== Chresten Jacobsen ===
On 20 February 1826, No. 76/115 was sold at auction to Chresten Jacobsen (1663-1838). He paid 23,240 rigsdaler for No. 76 and another 9,555 rigsdaler for No. 64. On 10 June 1826, he was granted citizenship as a real brewer in Copenhagen (as opposed to tenant brewer, acquired in 1817).

Jacobsen had leased Gyldenfeldt's Brewery on the other side of Knabrostræde from around 1911. On 24 October 1810, he had married Caroline Frederikke Schelbeck (1787-1844). Their first home together was an apartment in the corner building, No. 75. Their son H. C. Jacobsen was born in the building on 2 September 1811. Jacobsen immediately embarked on modernizing the expanding and modernizing the operations.

=== J. C. Jacobsen ===
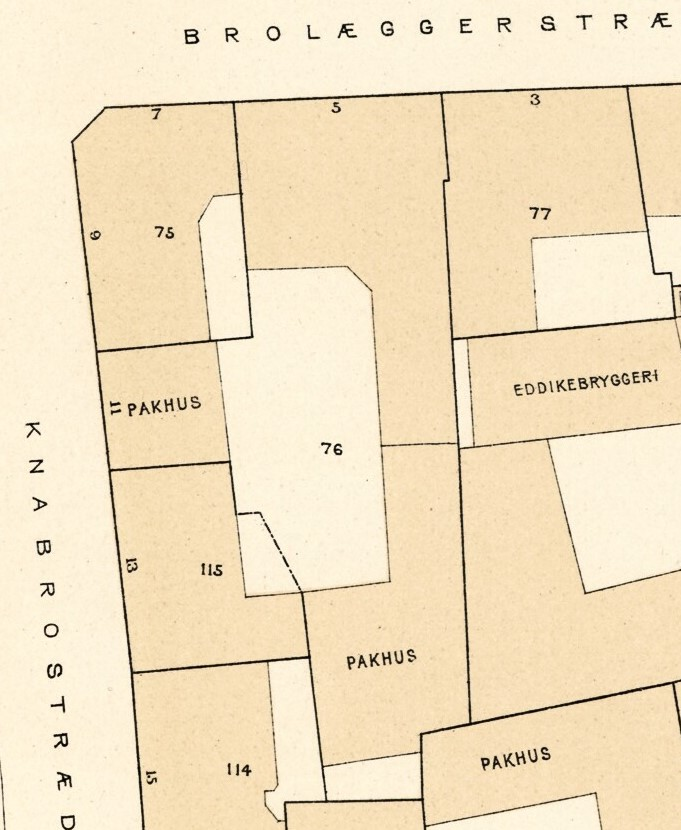
The three properties with the new cadastral numbers, seen in a detail from Berggreen's block plan of Snaren's Quarter

The brewery was after Chresten Jacobsen's death in 1835 continued by his widow with their son J. C. Jacobsen as tenant brewer. In 1840, he became the owner of the property.

No. 76 was only home to 12 residents at the 1840 census. Jacob Christian Jacobsen resided on the ground floor with his wife Laura Cathinka født Holst, one male servant and one maid. Caroline Frederikke Jacobsen, his mother, resided on the second floor with the lodger Ludvig Philip Wassard and one maid. Carl Frederik Knusen, a secretary in the Gen. Tolds. og Commerce Collegium with title of kammerråd, resided on the first floor with his wife Wilhelmine Dorothea (née Dahlin) and one maid. Jens Olsen, a barkeeper, resided in the basement with his wife Ane Sophie Olsen.

No. 115 was home to 26 residents at the 1840 census. Peter Løvgreen, a master shoemaker, resided on the ground floor with his wife Cathrine Marie Løvgren, their 10-year-old daughter, one shoemaker (employee) and two shoemaker's spprentices. Christen Christensen, a brewery worker, resided on the first floor with his wife Johanne Christensen and two widow lodgers. Guldbrand Olsen Sandholdt, a customs official, resided on the second floor with his wife Ane Sandholdt and two of their children (aged 33 and 34). Søren Andersen, a courier in the Department of Foreign Affairs, resided on the second floor with his wife Sophie Christine Andersen and their 11-year-old daughter. Ellen Thilesen, a widow employed with needlework, resided on the third floor with her three children (aged one to four) and one lodger. Charles Antoine Villaume, a language teacher, resided on the third floor with his wife Christine født Munck and their three children (aged 19 to 23).

The corner building No. 75 was home to another 42 residents at the 1840 census. Rasmus Hansen, a master shoemaker, resided on the ground floor with his wife Susanne Torbach, warehouse manager Andreas Arrebo Iversen and one maid. Poul Møller, a flour merchant and baker, resided on the ground floor with his wife Marie Munck, their two children (aged 13 and 15) and his sister Christine Møller. Anna Cathrine Hein, widow of a lieutenant-colonel, resided on the first floor with her four children (aged 12 to 26) and one maid. Hanne Krarup (née Hansen, widow of a flour merchant), resided on the first floor with her three children (aged three to eight) and one lodger (clock maker). Anders Nielsen, a policeman, resided on the second floor to the right with his wife Ane Marie Nielsenand one lodger (law student). Four unmarried women (aged 18 to 39) employed with needlework shared the second-floor apartment to the left. Cecilia Waldgreen, a woman employed with needlework and washing, resided on the third floor to the right with her two children (aged four and 14) and one lodger. Johan Christian Smit, a joiner, resided on the third floor to the left with his wife Charlothe Louise Smit, their two children (aged one and four) and two lodgers.

Carl Jacobsen was born in the building in 1842. The military officer and politician Anton Frederik Tscherning resided in one of the apartments from 1842 to 1847. He was a personal friend of J. C. Jacobsen.

Jacobsen had already started to experiment with the brewing of lager beer in 1939. He used a former gunpowder depot in the city's Northern City Gate for storing the beer.

In search of better water supplies and more space, Jacobsen decided to construct a new brewery in Valby. Construction of the new brewery started in January 1847 and the first batch of beer was brewed on 10 November 1847. In 1853, he constructed a villa for his own use next to the brewery.

=== August Vogelius and the 1860 census ===
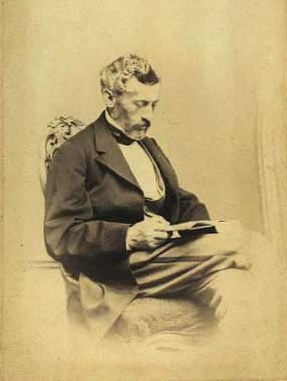
August Vogelius

In 1857, August Vogelius leased Jacobsen's small beer brewery in Brolæggerstræde. Vogelius was a relative of Jacobsen's wife Laura. He had already worked for the past six years at Carlsberg Brewery. The buildings were again too small and outdated to compete with Rabeshave and Tvedes Bryggeri, which had opened outside the city. Vogelius therefore ended up starting his own brewery at Tabneks Allé with Jørgen Christian Hauberg as a silent partner under the name A. Vogelius' Bryggeri (A. Vogelius' brewery). Jacobsen assisted Vogelius in the planning of the new brewery on Rahbejs Allé. The buildings were designed by Jens Eckersberg. The brewery started operating on 14 August 1861.

The architect Johan Daniel Herholdt was among the residents of the building in the from 1856 to 1859. His next home was a villa constructed to his own design at Ewaldsgade 9.

No. 76 (Brolæggerstræde 5) was home to 25 residents at the 1860 census. August Wogelius resided on the second floor with his wife Jens Christensen and the brewery workerer Jens Nielsen. Otto Dantzen, a bookkeeper, resided on the second floor with his wife Elisa Dantzen, their eight children (aged three to 17) and two maids. Viggo Collstrup, a doctor at the Royal Ingeneering Corps, resided on the first floor with his wife Hanne Collstrup, their foster daughter Petrea Hansen and one maid. Nicoline Severine Tage, widow of a General War Commissioner, resided on the ground floor with one maid. Jens Olsen, a barkeeper, resided in the basement with his wife Ole Jensen Worm and two male servants.

No. 75 (Knabrostræde 9) was home to another 29 residents at the 1860 census. Lars Hansen, a flour merchant (widower), resided on the ground floor with his wife Ane Cathrine and their two children (aged eight and 10). Thomas Christian Teil, a retired justitsråd, resided on the first floor to the left with his housekeeper Ane Jensen. Cark Rejnholdt Jensen, a surveyor, resided on the first floor to the right with his wife Wilhelmine Mathilde and their one-year-old daughter. Lars Jørgensen, a royal lackey, resided on the second floor to the left with his wife Anna Christine. Rasmus Carl Lund, a widower with means, resided on the second floor to the right with his son Carl Knud Lund and his housekeeper Johanne Jørgensen. Berent Kruse, a bookbinder, resided on the third floor to the left with his wife Johanne Jensine, their seven-year-old son and one lodger. Jochum Melchior, a customs assistant, resided on the third floor to the right with his wife Anne Dorothea and their 19-year-old daughter Adolphine Theodora. Jens Jensen, a servant, resided in the basement to the left with his wife Anne Severine and their two daughters (aged nine and 12). Jens Jensen, a workman, resided in the basement to the right with his daughter Emilie.

No. 115 (Knabrostræde 13) was home to 24 residents at the 1860 census. Johan Peter Conradsen, a bookseller, resided on the ground floor with his wife Elisabeth Kirstine (née Damkjer) and their five children (aged 11 to 28). Poul Henriksen, a brewery worker (bryggerkarl), resided on the first floor with his wife Caroline (née Herlin) and their two children (aged 13 and 14). Thrine Levy, a widow, resided on the second floor with her 30-year-old daughter Gurli Levy and her 15-year-old grandson Emil Hertz. Ludvig Thorin, a policeman, resided on the second floor to the right with his wife Marie Cathrine (née Aagesen) and their 20-year-old foster daughter Oline Christiane Andersen. Christopher Thaader Arenberg, a master tailor, resided on the third floor to the left with his wife Kirstine (née Madsen) and their two children (aged two and five). Rasmus Nielsen, a courier at City Hall, resided on the third floor to the right with his wife Margrethe Sophie (née Madsen) and their 17-year-old daughter.

=== Later history ===
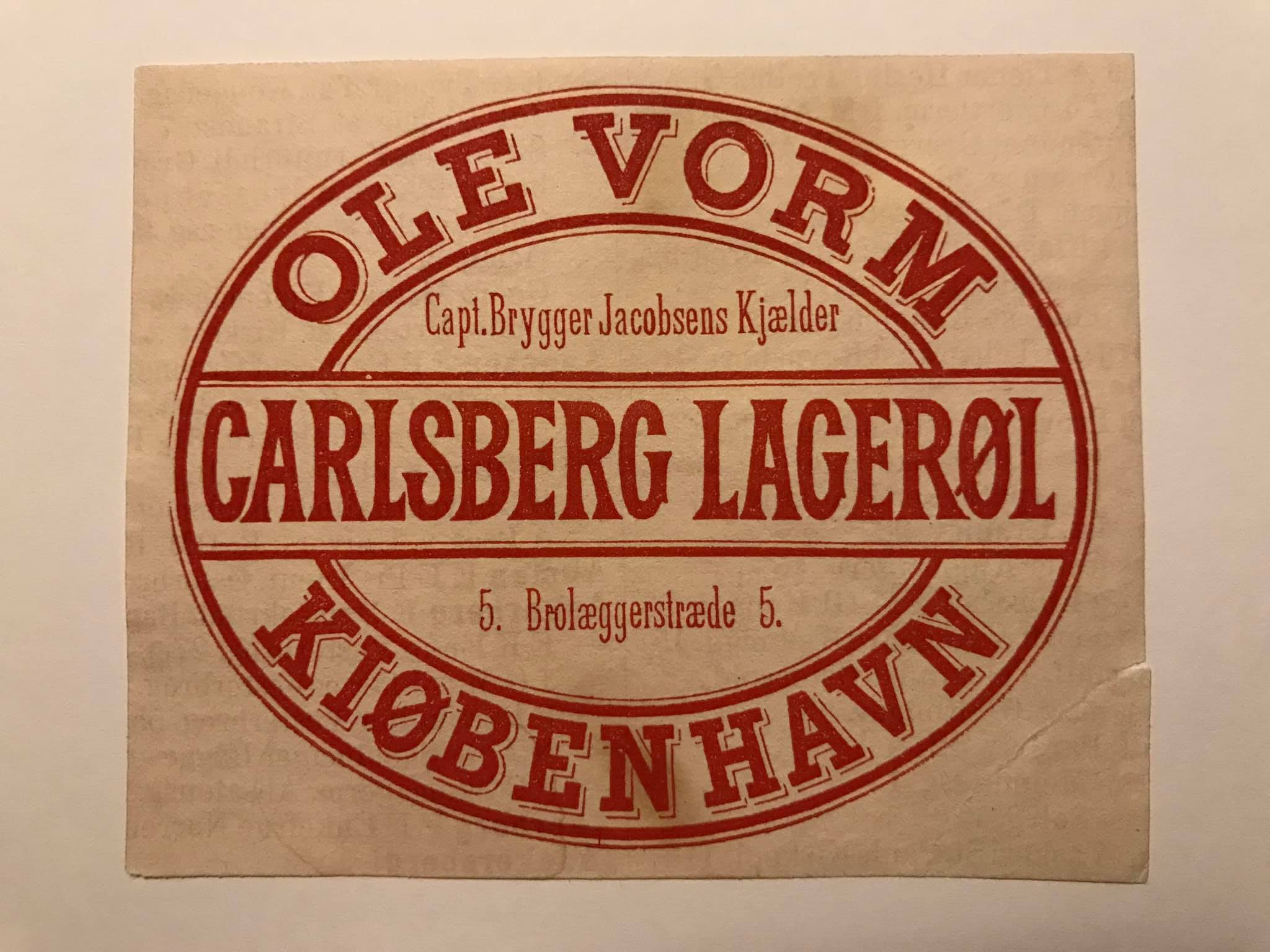
A Gamle Carlsberg beer label with "Ole Vorm" and "Brolæggerstræde 5" printed on the label

J. Olsen operated a beer shop in "Captain Jacobsen's basement". In 1871, it was taken over by his nephew Ole Vorm. He had worked for the uncle for the past 18 years. The shop was after his death on 11 May 1895 continued by his widow and son as "Ole Vorm's Eftf" ("Ole Vorm's Successor") until c. 1907.

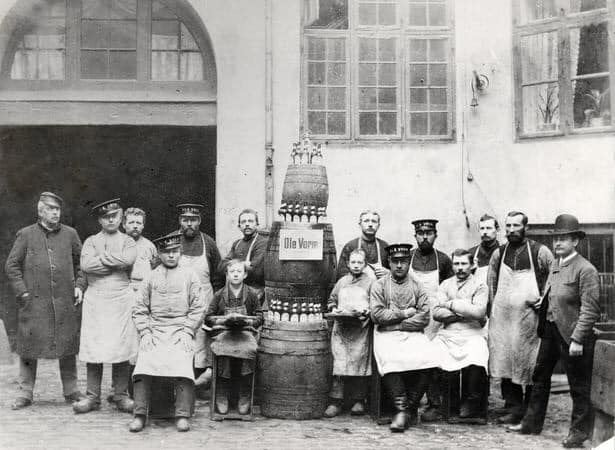
Ole Vorm's staff, photographed in the yard in 1894

Brolæggerstræde 5–7 was home to just 10 residents at the 1906 census. Jacobine Helene Gottlieb (née Holst, 1830–1913), a daughter of Carl Jacobsen's uncle Lauritz Daniel Christian Holst, resided on the ground floor with two maids. Her husband Harald Gottlieb (1818-1868) had died in 1868. Otto Wolff, an engineer and managing director (6 April 1858-), resided on the first floor. Barbra Christiane Holm (1817-1914), widow of merchant (grosserer) Peter Christian Holm (1918-1895), resided on the second floor with her daughter Alma Henriette Holm and the relative Kate Edith Holm (porcelain painter). Karen Marie Brunniche, a cleaning lady, resided in the garret with her son Hans Gustav Bertel Brunniche.

In 1913 Carl Jacobsen presented the building complex to the Carlsberg Foundation.

The complex was listed on the Danish registry of protected buildings and places in 1945. In 1950-1951, Viggo Steen Møller (1897-1990) undertook a comprehensive restoration of the buildings. The renovation received an award from the City of Copenhagen in 1952. In 1973-1975, Vilhelm Wohlert (1920-2007) was charged with adapting the former brewhouse for use as a new home for the Nt Carlsberg Foundation. The project received an award from the City of Copenhagen in 1976.

== Architecture ==
=== Brolæggerstræde 5 ===
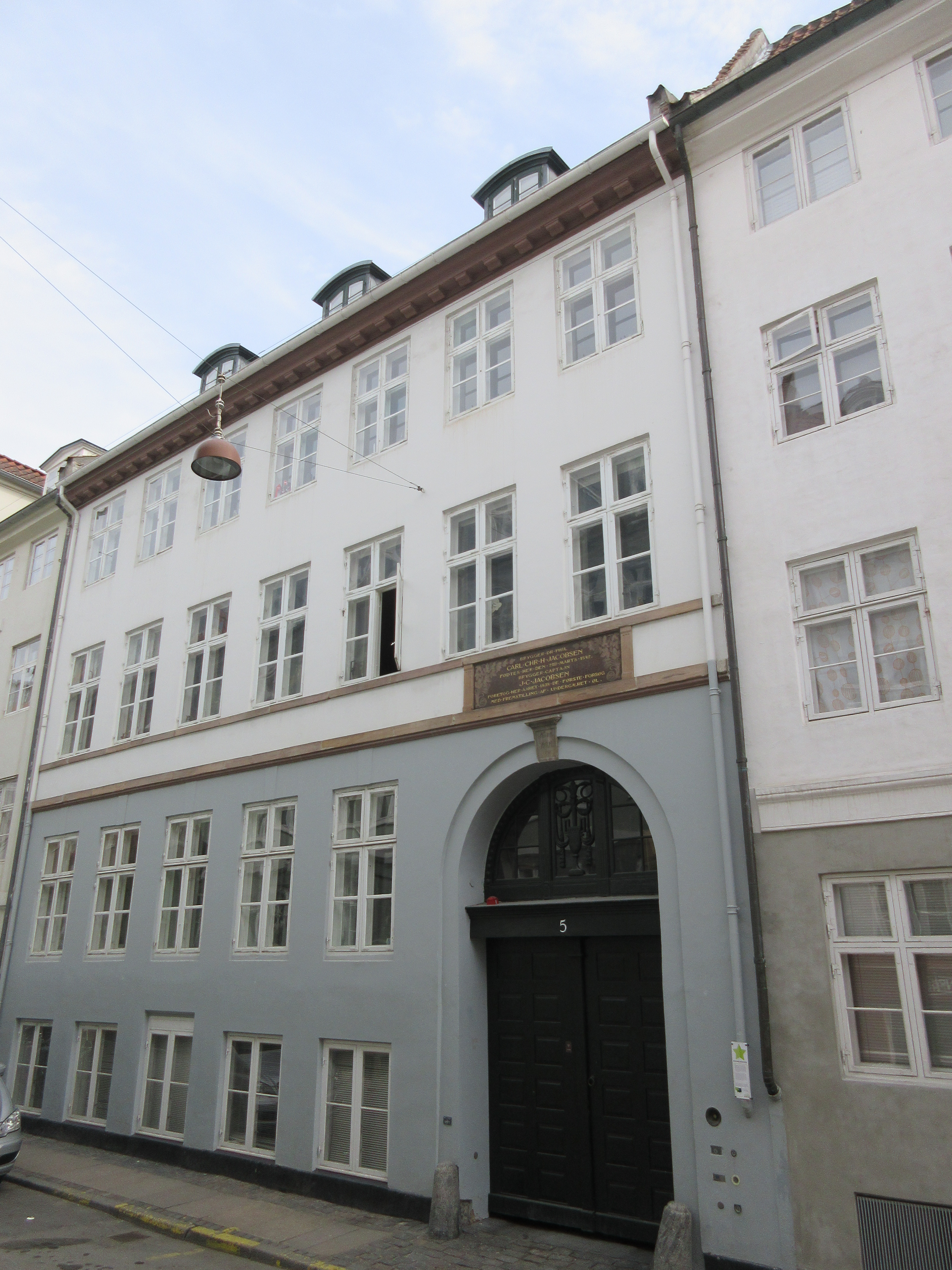
Brolæggerstræde 5 seen from the street

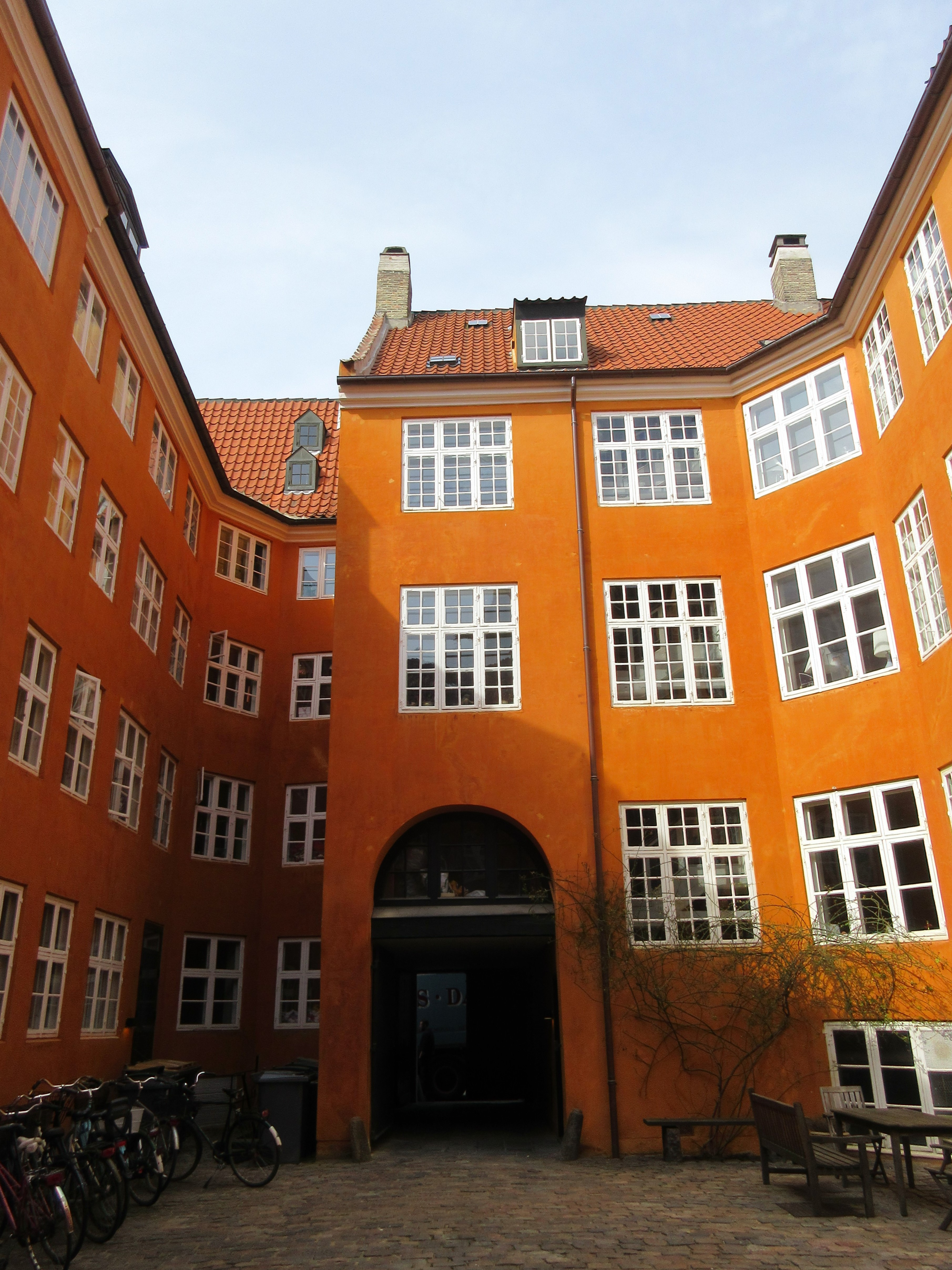
The building seen from the courtyard

Brolæggerstræde 5 is constructed with three storeys over a walk-out basement. The seven-bays-wide facade is finished with a belt course above the ground floor, a sill course below the first-floor windows and a modillioned cornice. It is plastered and painted in a blueish-grey colour on the ground floor and white on the upper floors. An arched gateway is located in the two bays furthest to the right. The keystone features the old cadastral number (No. 113) as well as the year of construction (1797). Above the gate is a stone plaque, with an inscription in gold lettering, commemorating that Carl Jacobsen was born in the building in 1942 and that J. C. Jacobsen undertook his first experiments with the brewing of lager beer (undergæret øl) in the building in 1838. The now bricked-up basement entrance was originally topped by a hood mould supported by corbels. Access to the main staircase of the building is via a door in the gateway. The pitched red tile roof features five dormer windows towards the street. A six-bays-long side wing extends from the rear side of the building along one side of the central courtyard. It is integrated with the front wing via a canted corner bay. All the facades facing the courtyard are finished with iron vitriol yellow lime mortar.

=== Knabrostræde 11–13 ===
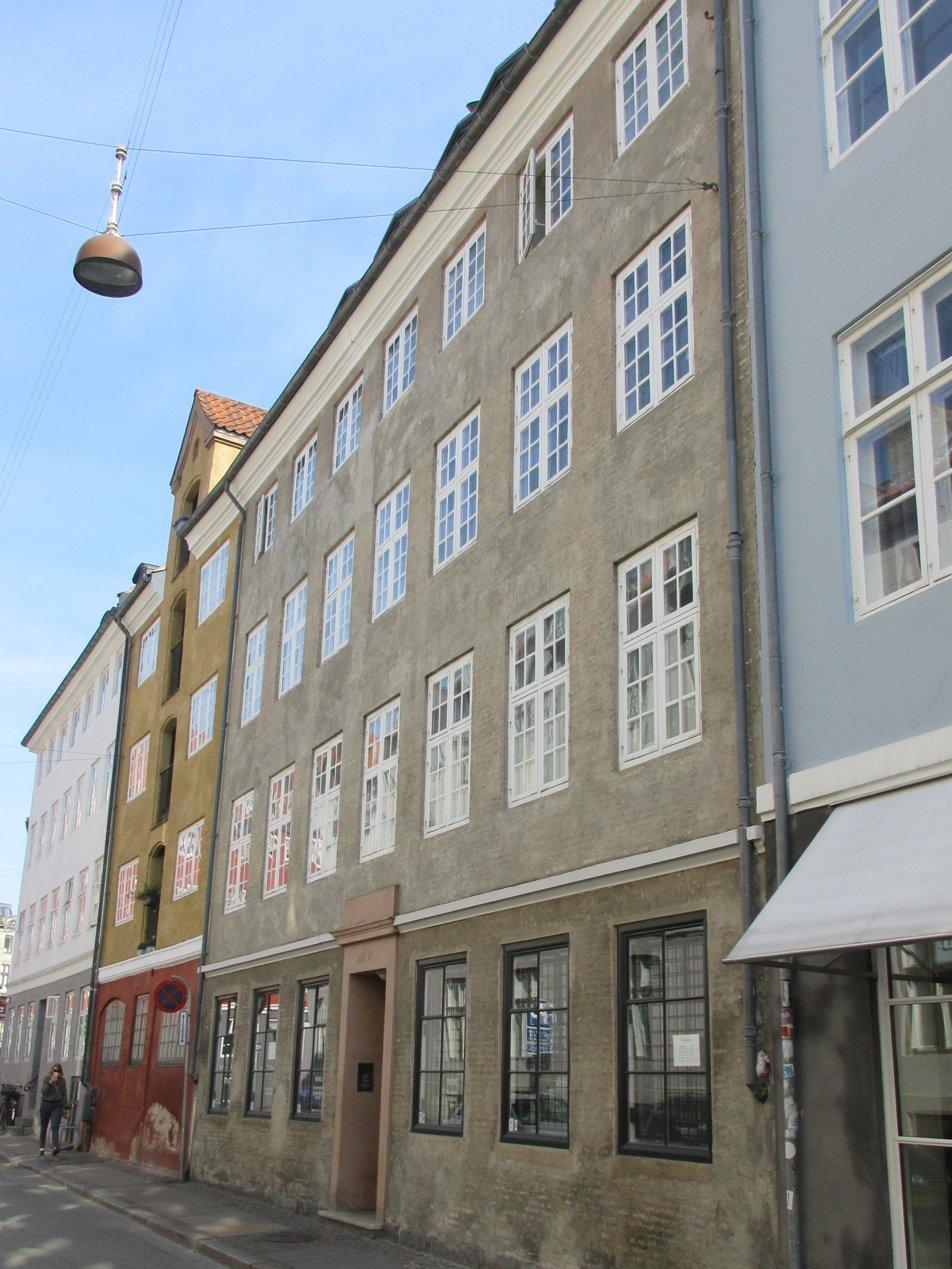
Brolæggerstræde 13

Knabrostræde 13 is a seven-bays-wide and four storeys tall former storage building with a shop premises on the ground floor. The facade is rendered in a pale grey colour, with white painted window frames. It is finished with a white-painted belt course above the ground floor and a broad modillioned cornice. The main entrance in the centre of the facade is accented with a portal painted in the same colour as sandstone. The pitched red tile roof features four dormer windows. The rear side of the building (in the courtyard) is crowned by a two-bay gabled wall dormer.

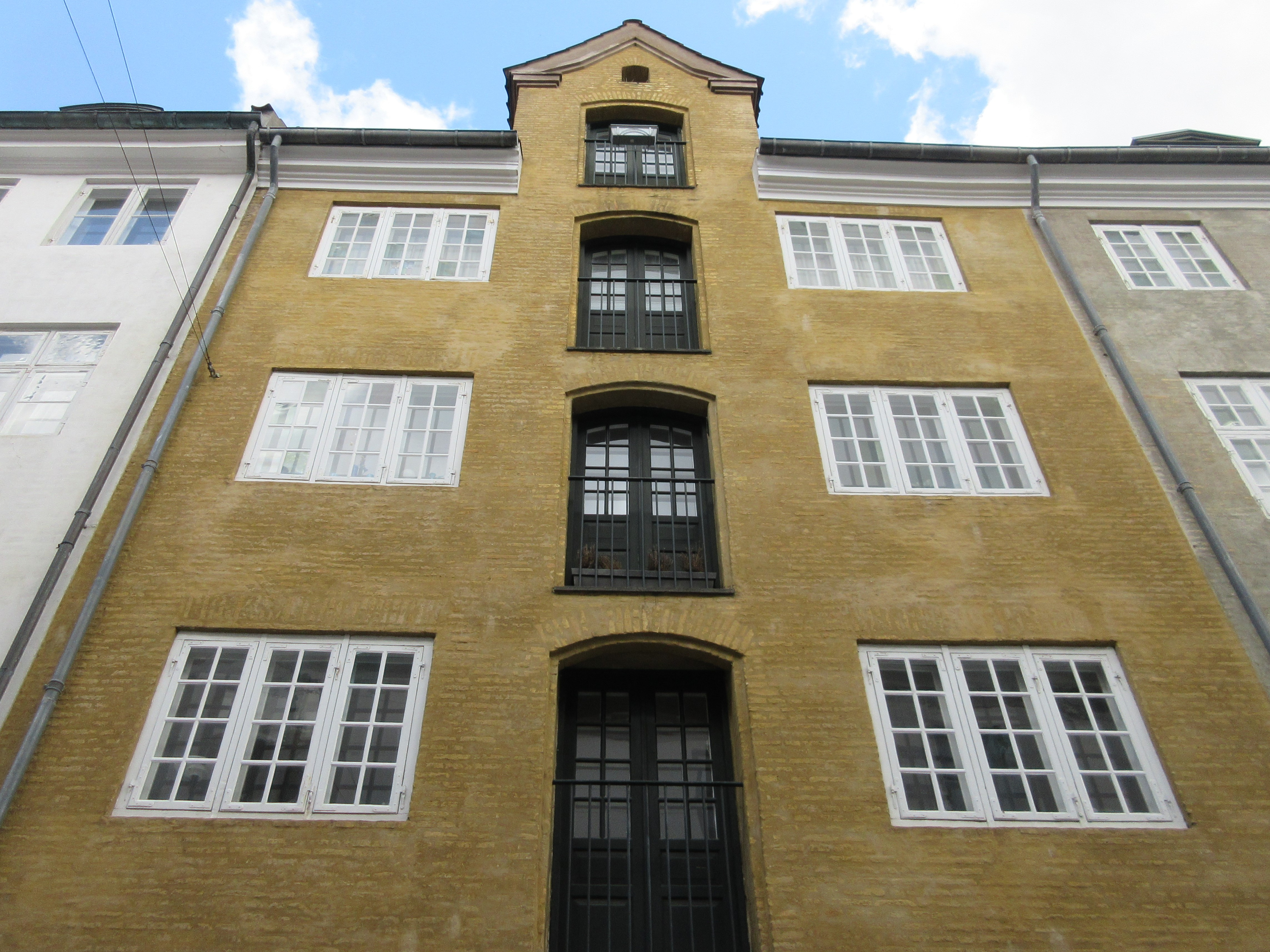
Knabrostræde 11

Knabrostræde 11 is a just three bays wide four-storey former warehouse. The gabled wall dormer with cornice returns was added in the 1820s. The facade is painted red on the ground floor and in a yellowish colour on the upper floors. The ground-floor window frames are painted in a dark colour while the window frames on the upper floors are white-painted. The ground floor was originally used for stabling of horses but has now been converted into garage space. The central openings on the upper floors have now been glazed and are fronted by French balconies.

The interior of Knabrostræde 11 and Knabrostræde 13 was merged into a single apartment on each floor when the buildings were renovated in 1952. A new staircase was also installed in the building.

=== Lnabrostræde 11–13 ===
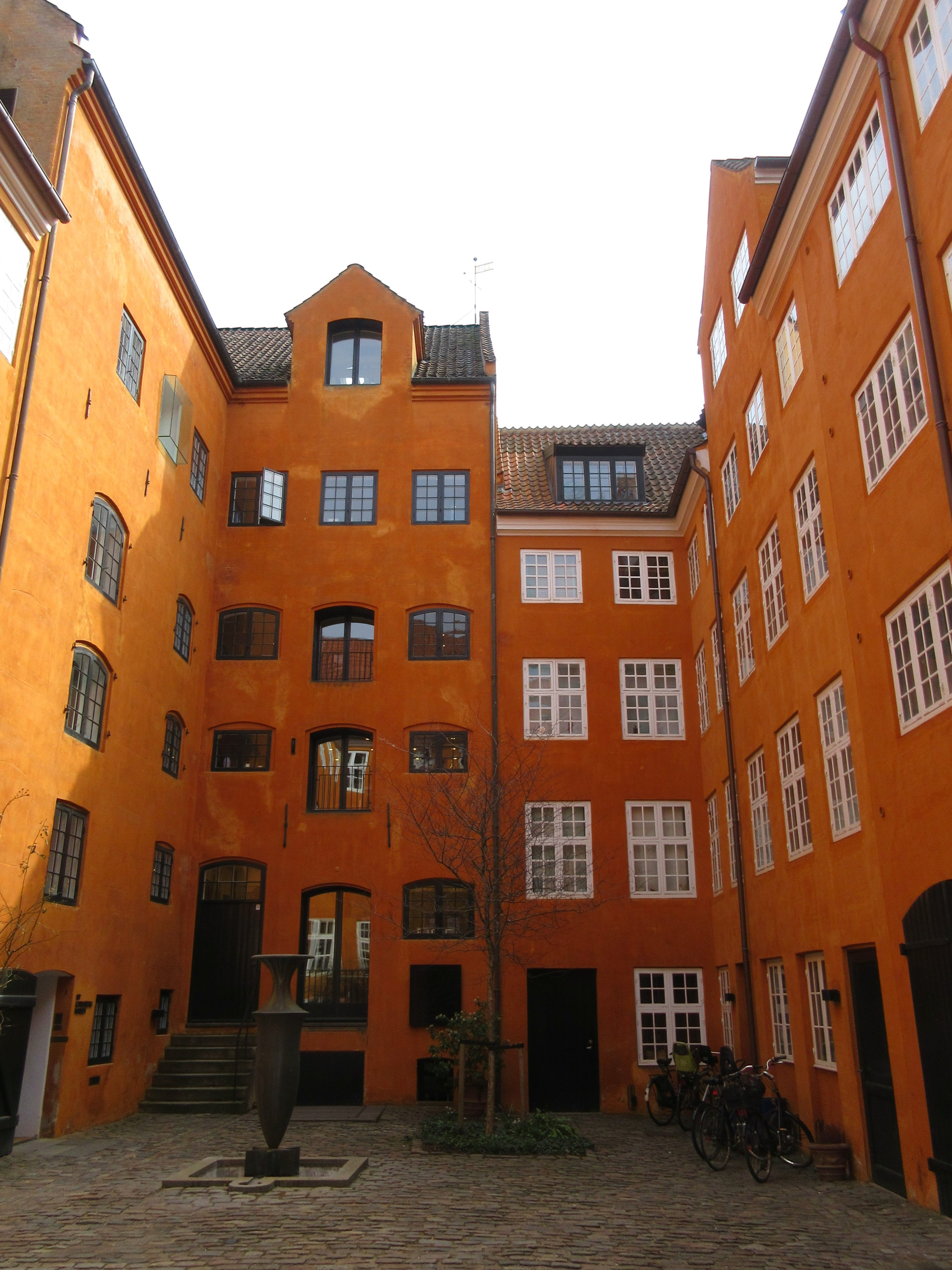
The brewery building and the side wing of Knabrostræde 13 (right)

The former brewery building is located at the other end of the rectangular courtyard. It was originally a three-storey building but was heightened with two storeys by Chresten Jacobsen in the late 1820s. A gabled wall dormer with a pulley beam was added some time between 1867 and 1886. The central openings are now glazed and fronted by French balconies. It is attached to the side wing of Knabrostræde 13 as well as to the side wing of Brolæggerstræde via a just two bays wide, five-storey connector. A narrow light well separates the building from Knabrostræde 15 (behind the side wing of Knabrostræde 13, cf. the plan drawing above). This side of the building features a number of wall anchors. It has a red tile roof.

=== Knabrostræde 9 ===
Knabrostræde 9 is constructed with four storeys over a walk-out basement. It has a seven-bays-long facade towards Knabrostræde, a four-bays-long facade towards Brolæggerstræde and a chamfered corner. The latter was dictated for all corner buildings by Jørgen Henrich Rawert's and Peter Meyn's guidelines for the rebuilding of the city after the fire so that the fire department's long ladder companies could navigate the streets more easily.

== Today ==
The complex is owned by the Carlsberg Foundation. The Carlsberg Foundation is based at H. C. Andersens Boulavard 35 but the affiliated Ny Carlsberg Foundation is based in the former brewery building in the courtyard. Most of the other buildings are let out as residential apartments.

== Gallery ==
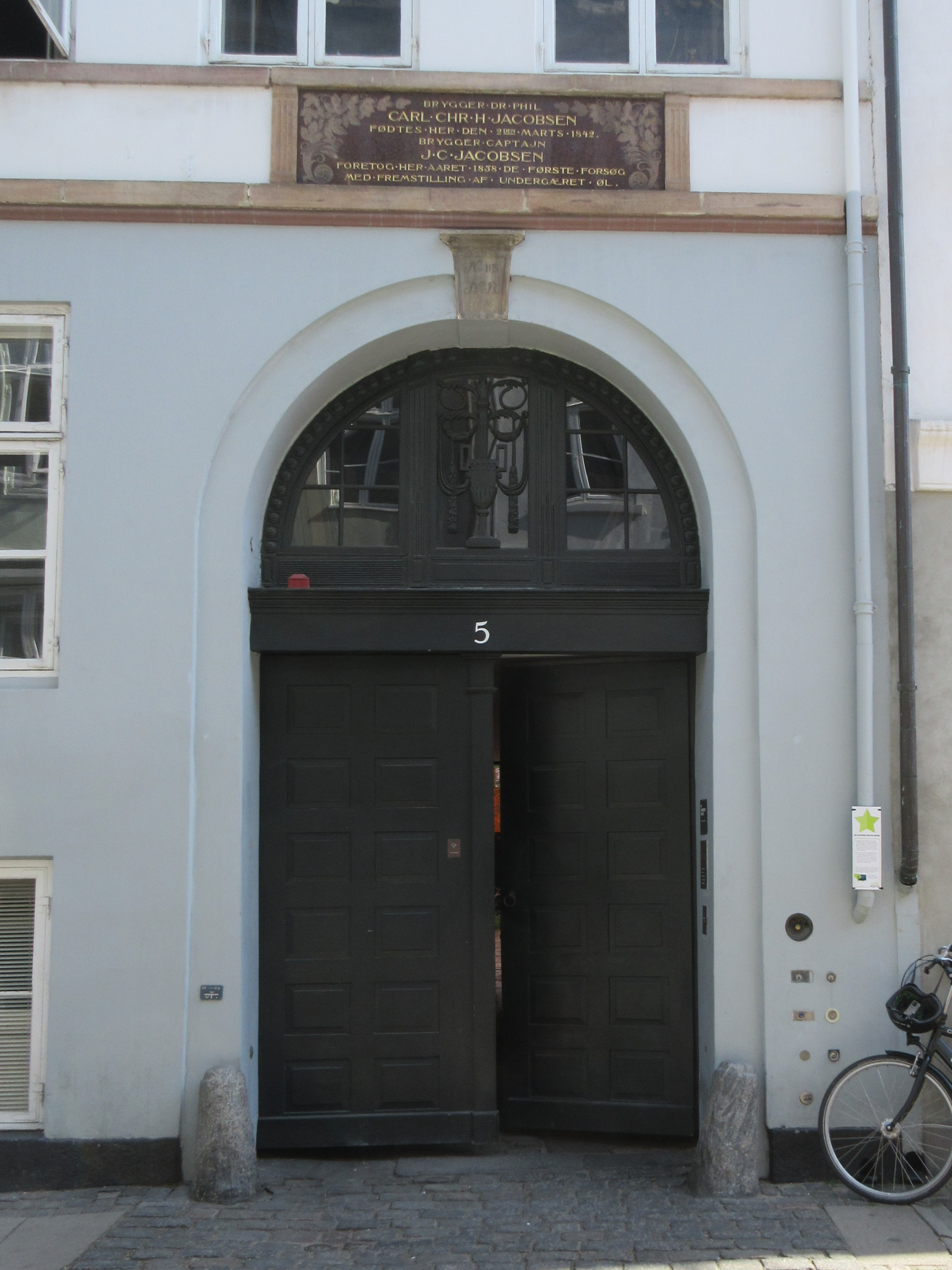
The gate at Brolæggerstræder 5

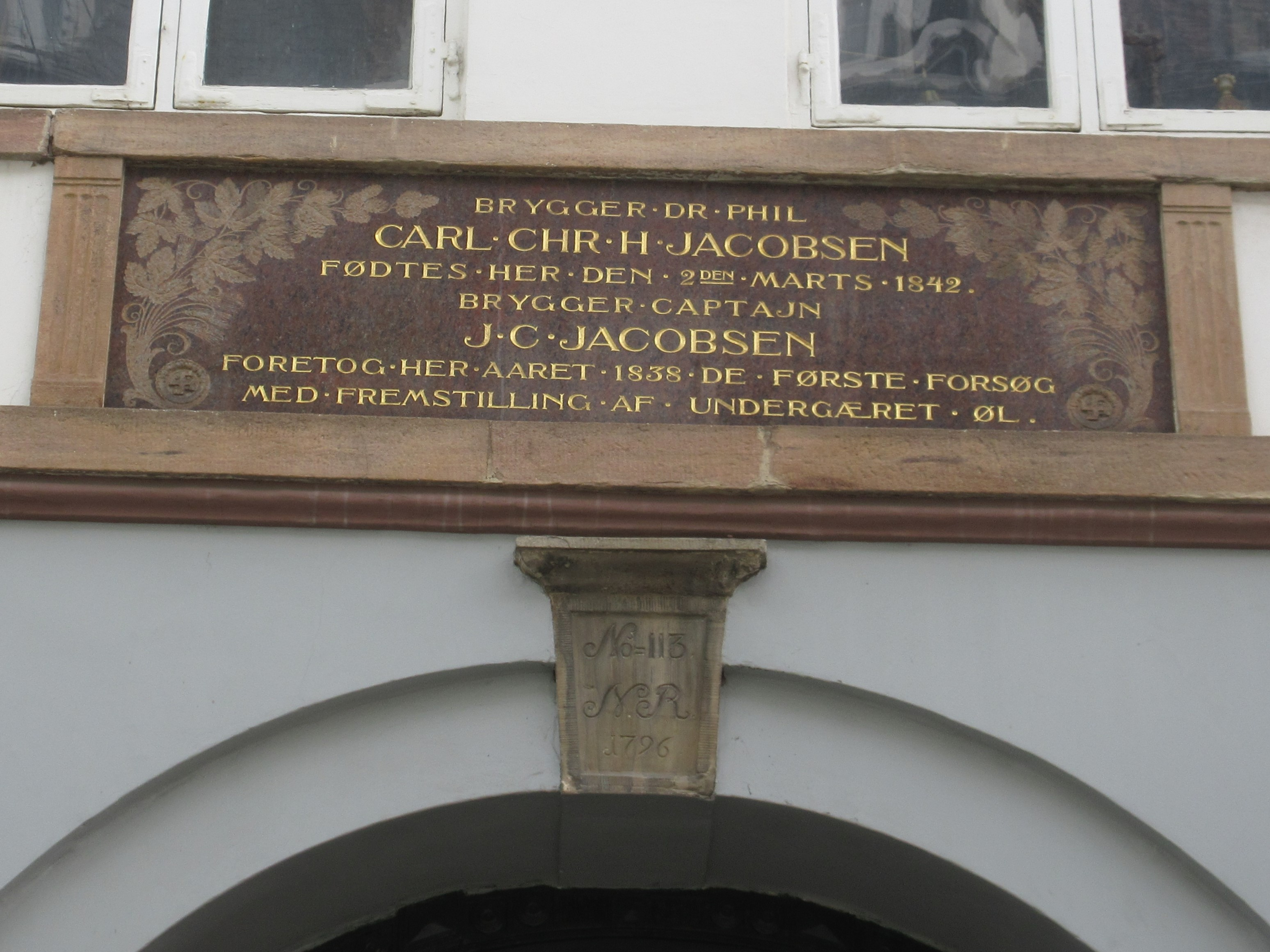
Commemorative plaque above the gate at No. 5

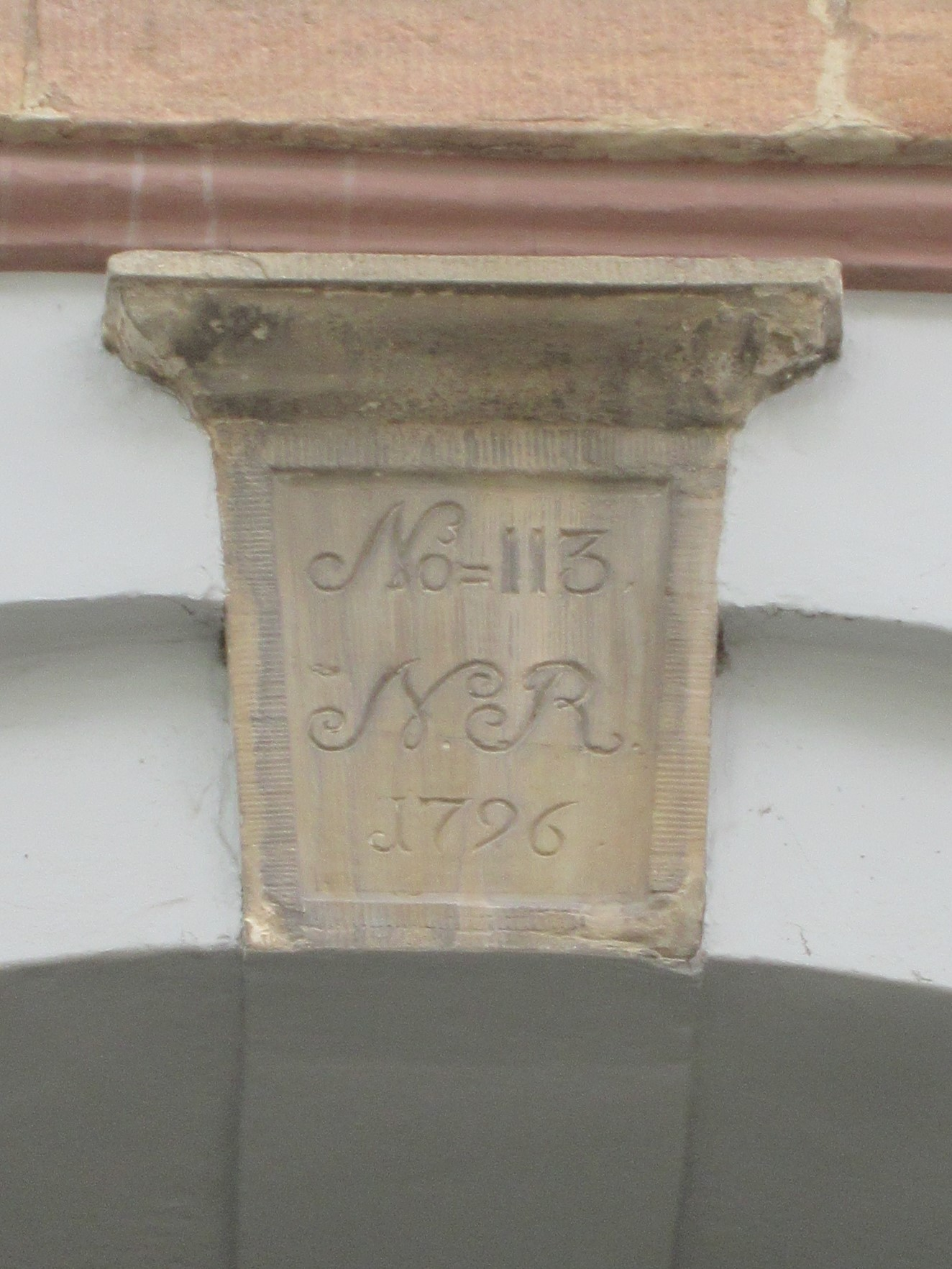
The keystone above the gate with the old and new cadastrel numbers No. 113 No. 79

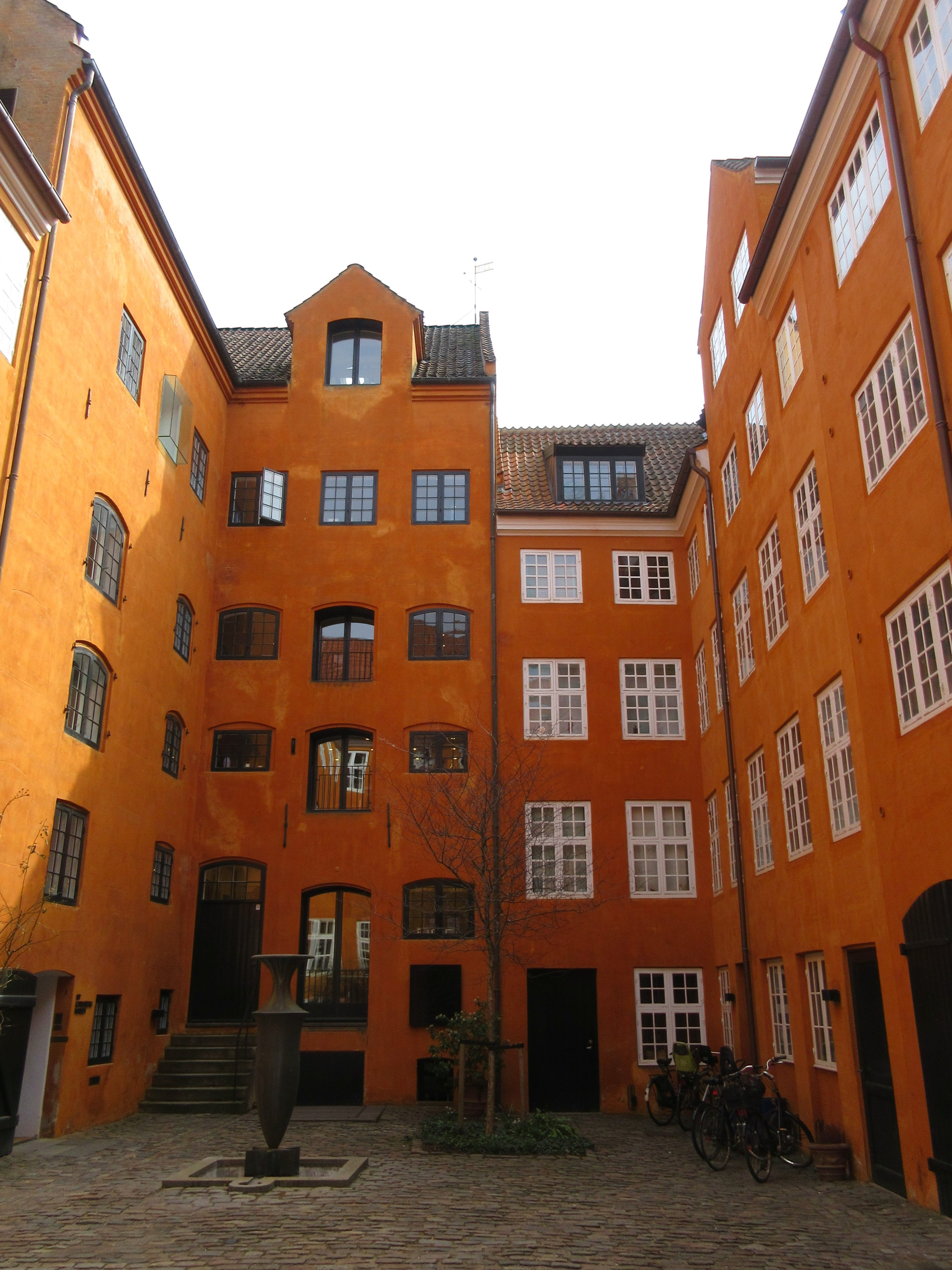
The yard
