= Rahbeks Allé Brewery =

Brewery in Copenhagen

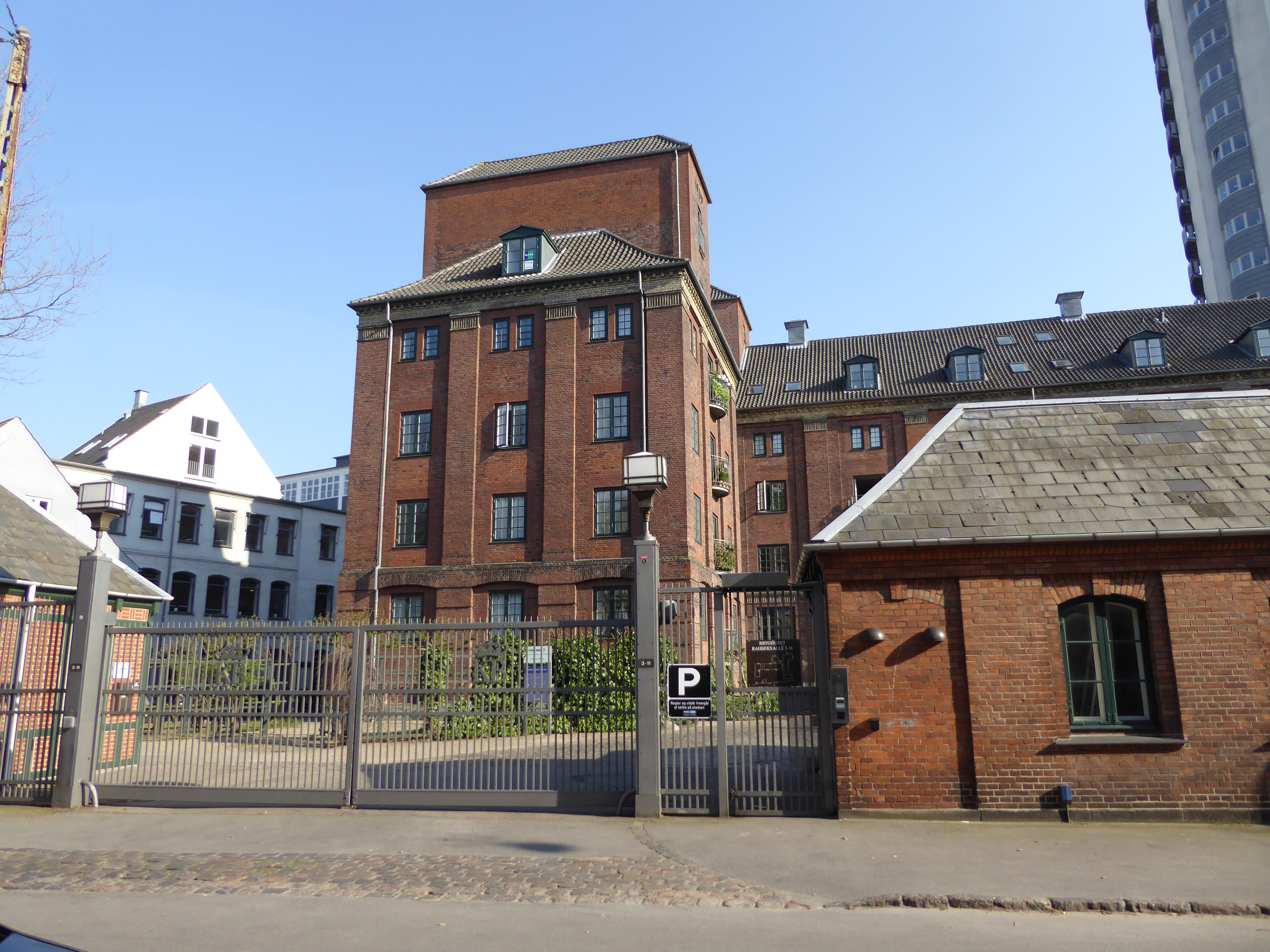
- Interactive map of the Rahbeks Allé Brewery area

General information
- Architectural style: Neoclassical
- Location: Copenhagen, Denmark
- Coordinates: 55°40′10.7″N 12°32′13.37″E
- Completed: 1861

Design and construction
- Architect: Jens Eckersberg

Rahbeks Allé Brewery (Danish:Bryggeriet i Rahbeks Allé) is a former brewery at Rahbeks Allé in Copenhagen, Denmark. The brewery was founded in 1860 and merged with several other breweries under the name De Forenede Bryggerier in 1890. From 1923 it operated under the name Kongens Bryghus and the site was decommissioned when De Forenede Bryggerier was acquired by Carlsberg Group in 1969. The buildings—a group of red brick buildings from 1860-61 by Jens Eckersberg and a tall, round silo from 1857 designed by Tyge Hvass—have been converted into apartments.

== History ==
=== A. Vogelius's brewery ===
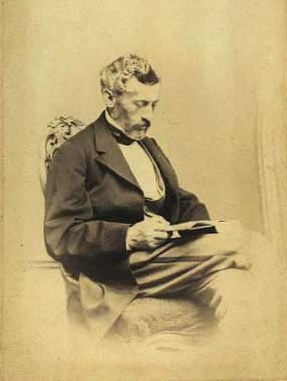
August Vogelius

The brewery was established in 1860 by Peter August Vogelius with Jørgen Christian Hauberg as a silent partner under the name A. Vogelius 's Bryggeri (A. Vogelius 's brewery).

Vogelius was a relative of Carlsberg-founder J. C. Jacobsen's wife Laura. He had worked for six years at Carlsberg Brewery and most recently from 1857 leased Jacobsen's small beer brewery at Brolæggerstræde 5 but the buildings were too small and outdated to compete with Rabeshave and Tvedes Bryggeri which had opened outside the city. Jacobsen assisted Vogelius in the planning of the new brewery on Rahbejs Allé. The buildings were designed by Jens Eckersberg. The brewery started operating on 14 August 1861. It bought a neighbouring piece of land in 1863 and was expanded in 1864.

=== Rahbeks Allé Brewery ===
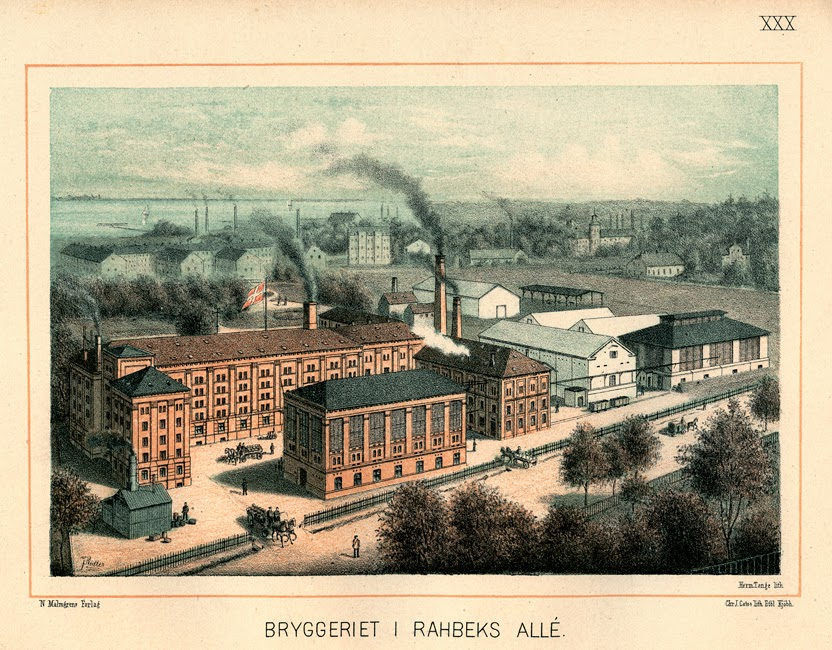
Rahbæks Allé Brewery

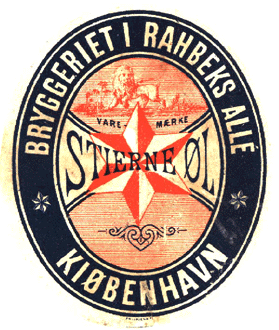
A label from the 1880s

The brewery was expanded and modernized in 1873-74. Vogelius and Hauberg sold the brewery to a consortium to provide the necessary capital for the project. Vogelius remained one of the owners but the day-to-day management was left in the hands of a brewer from Svanholm Brewery. Vogelius was once again managing director in 1880-87. He was succeeded by William Haurowitz, who came from a position as managing director of the largest brewery in Trondheim, Norway.

The brewery was in 1888 one of 10 breweries included in Danmarks Industrielle Etablissementer I-III, an illustrated work with descriptions of 107 Danish industrial enterprises published by N. Malmgren and his widow in 1878-1889.

=== Kongens Bryghus ===
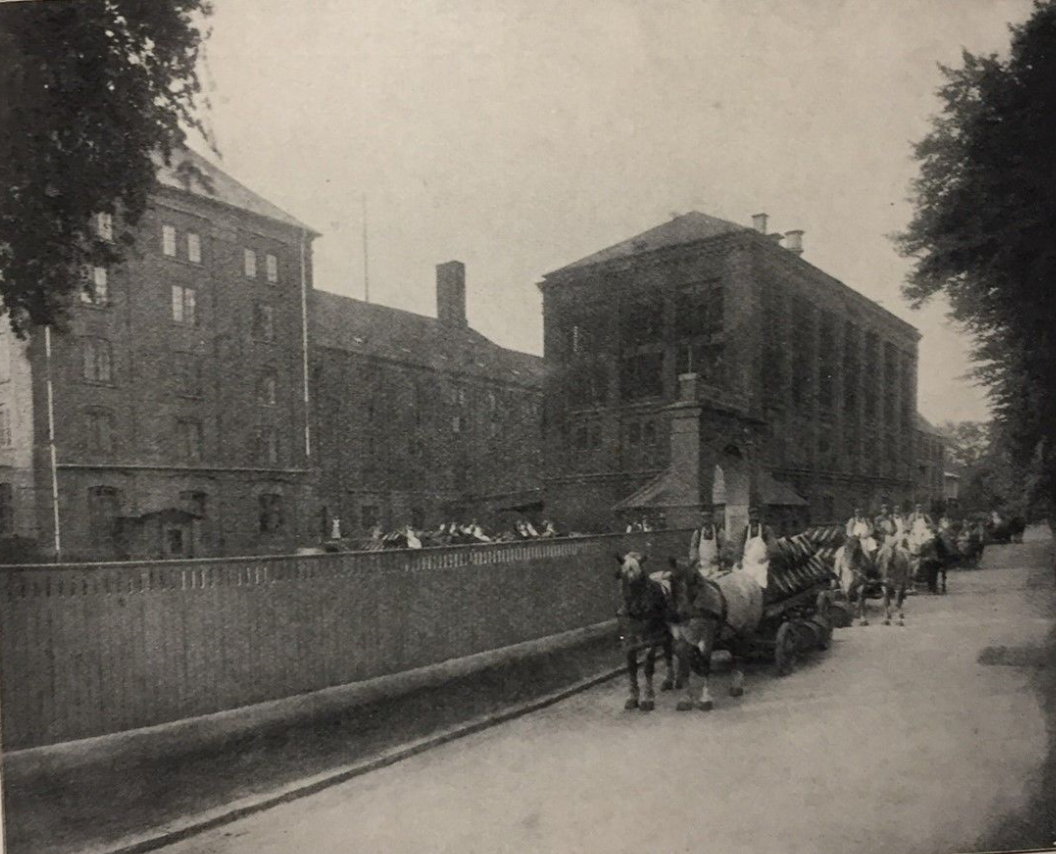
The brewery in 1900

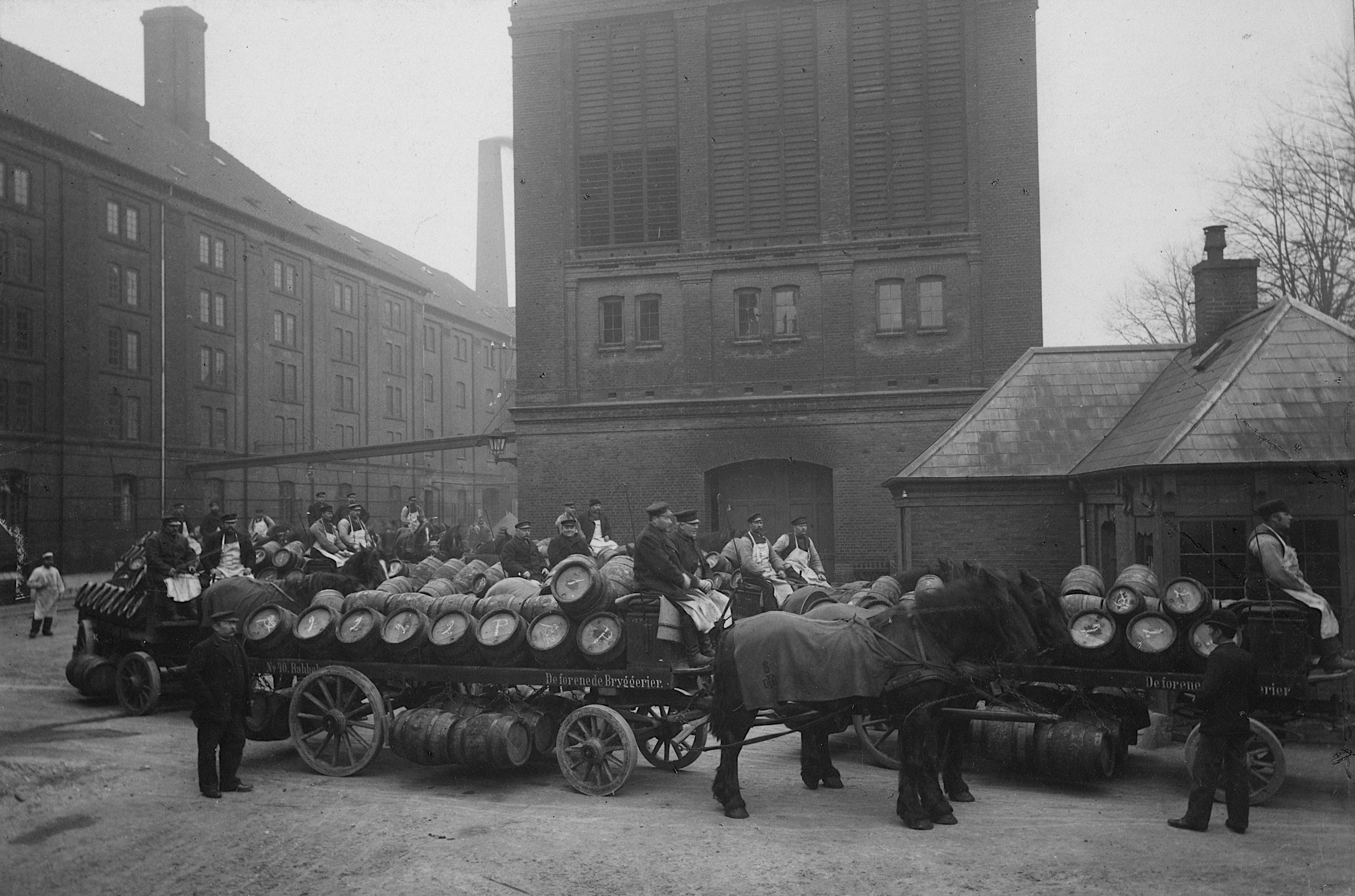
Rahbek Allé Brewert photographed by Frederik Riise.

The brewery was in 1890 merged with several other breweries under the name De Forenede Bryggerier. The other breweries were Kongens Bryghus and Marstrands Bryggerier, Tvedes Bryggeri on Vesterbrogade, Alliance in Valby, Bryggeriet Kastrup on Amager and the three Frederiksberg breweries Svanholm, Ny Bryghus and Frederiksberg Bryggeri. The brewery on Rahbeks Allé was from 1902 exclusively used for brewing of small beer and skibsøl. It was expanded in 1909 and again in 1913.

Rahbeks Allé and Kroneølbryggeriet was from 1923 operated under the name Kongens Brughus but was still part of De Forenede Bryggerier. A tall round silo was constructed in 1957. The brewery site was decommissioned when De Forenede Bryggerier was merged into Carlsberg in 1969. The buildings were for a while used by Carlsberg for stabling of horses, storage space and an educational centre.

== Today ==
The buildings were, in 1994-97, converted into apartments. They are set in a small garden. The red brick buildings from 1860-61 have previously been used as grain silo, horse stable, malt house and warehouse. They have now been converted into 85 apartments. The 21-story silo from 1957 contains 38 apartments.
