= Langebrogade 8 =

Historic building in Copenhagen, Denmark

- Højbro Plads 6
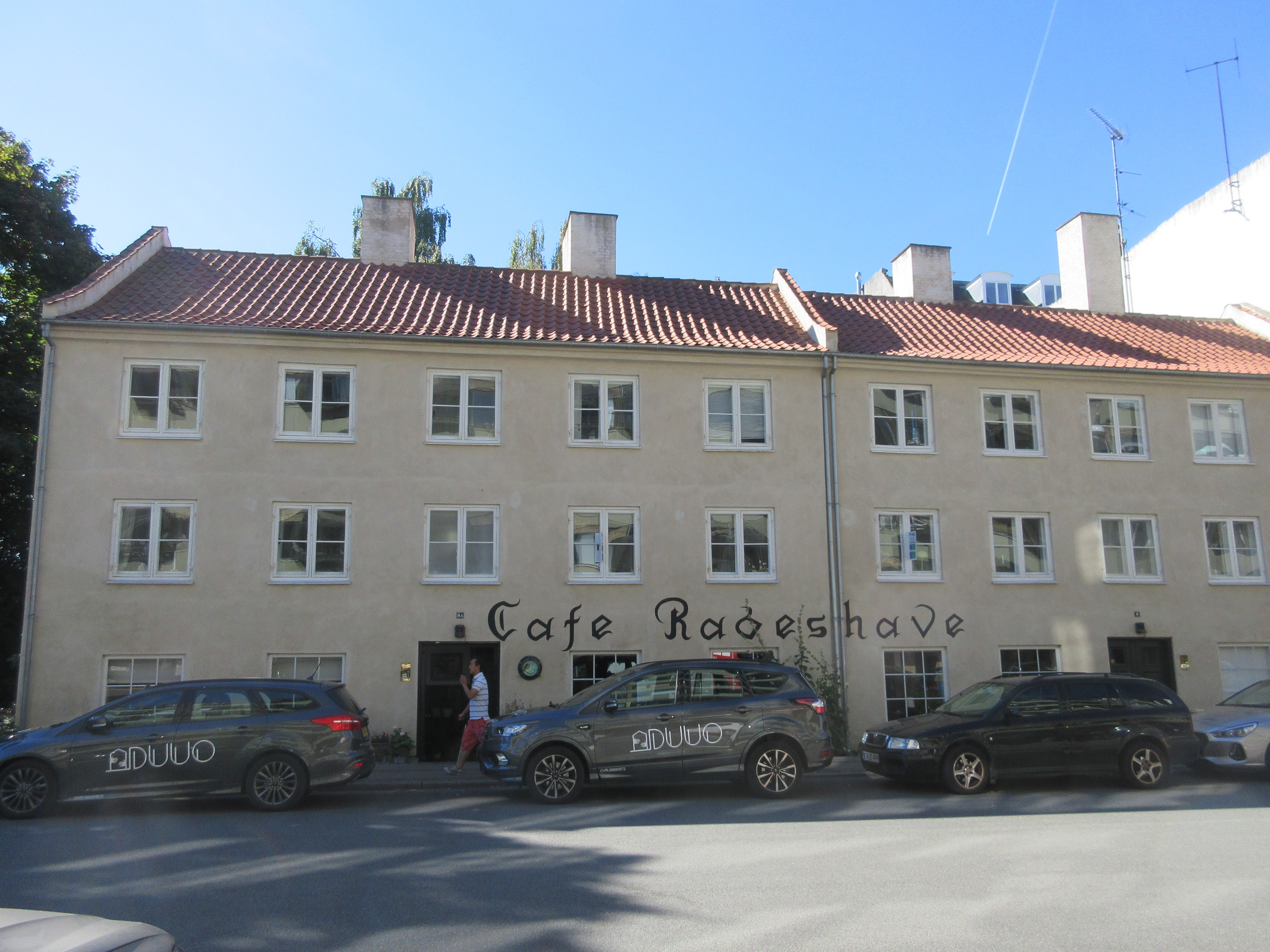
- Langebrogade 8 in 2022.
- Interactive map of the Langebrogade 8 area

General information
- Location: Copenhagen, Denmark
- Coordinates: 55°40′12.58″N 12°35′10.07″E
- Completed: 1802 to 1814

Langebrogade 8–8A, formerly part of the adjacent Rabeshave Brewery site in Enhjørningens Bastion (now Langebrogade 6–8), is an early 19th century double house situated on Langebrogade, opposite Applebys Plads. in the Christianshavn neighborhood of central Copenhagen, Denmark. It was listed in the Danish registry of protected buildings and places in 1988. The former Rabeshave Brewery owes its name to Peter Rabe Holm, a wine merchant who established a small beer brewery on the site in the late 18th century. In the 1850s, it was replaced by a modern, industrial brewery by brewer Christian Ditlev Friedel (1817–1882) and Frederik Marcus Knuth. In 1891, Rabeshave Brewery merged with 11 other breweries as De Forenede Bryggerier. In 1907–19, J. Wiedemann constructed a sausage factory on the site. These buildings have now been converted into a multi-tenant office complex (Langebrogade 6). A restaurant named Rabes Have ("Rabe's Garden") is still located in the basement of the listed building at No. 8A. The industrial building complex at No. 6 is not part of the heritage listing but registered with "high preservation value" (høj bevaringsværdighed).

== History ==
=== 18th century ===
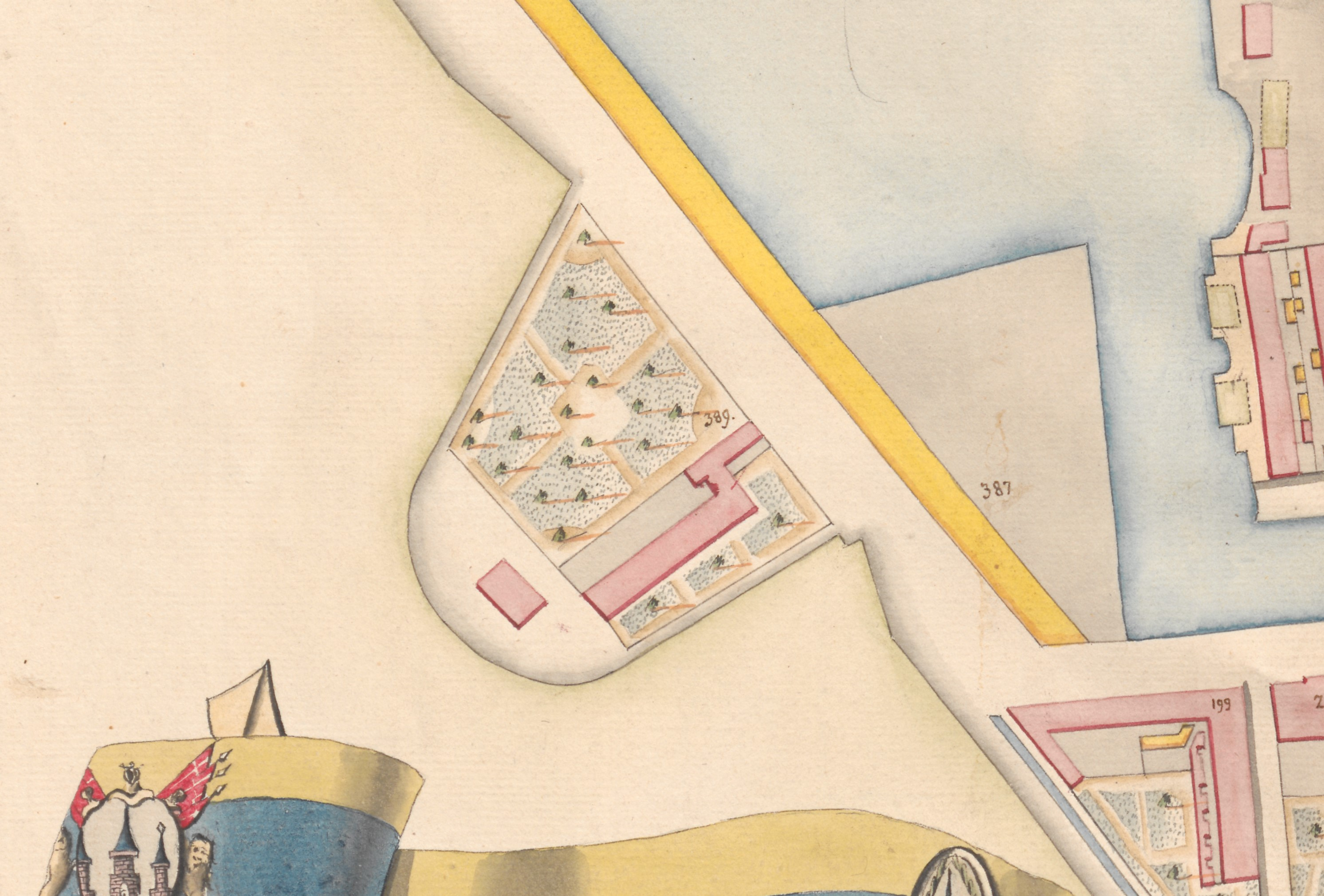
No. 389 seen on a detail from Christian Gedde's map of Christianshavn Quarter, 1757.

Enhjørningens Bastion was constructed in 1668–1670. A smock mill was constructed on the bastion by Hans Nielsen and Lorents Krøyer in 1683. It was used as an oil mill. At the foot of the bastion was a combined distillery and tavern frequented by the many Dutch farmers from Amager who came to Copenhagen on market days to sell their produce in Amagertorv. The site was listed in Copenhagen's first cadastre of 1689 as No. 251 in Christianshavn Quarter. It was still jointly owned by judge Hans Nielsen and Lorenz Krejer at that time. Nielsenm's share of the windmill was later acquired by Peter Råben. The pol mill was destroyed by fire in 1714. Krøyer and Raaben responded by purchasing another windmill constructed by Peder Hansen Quist on Sophie Hedevig's Bastion in 1687.

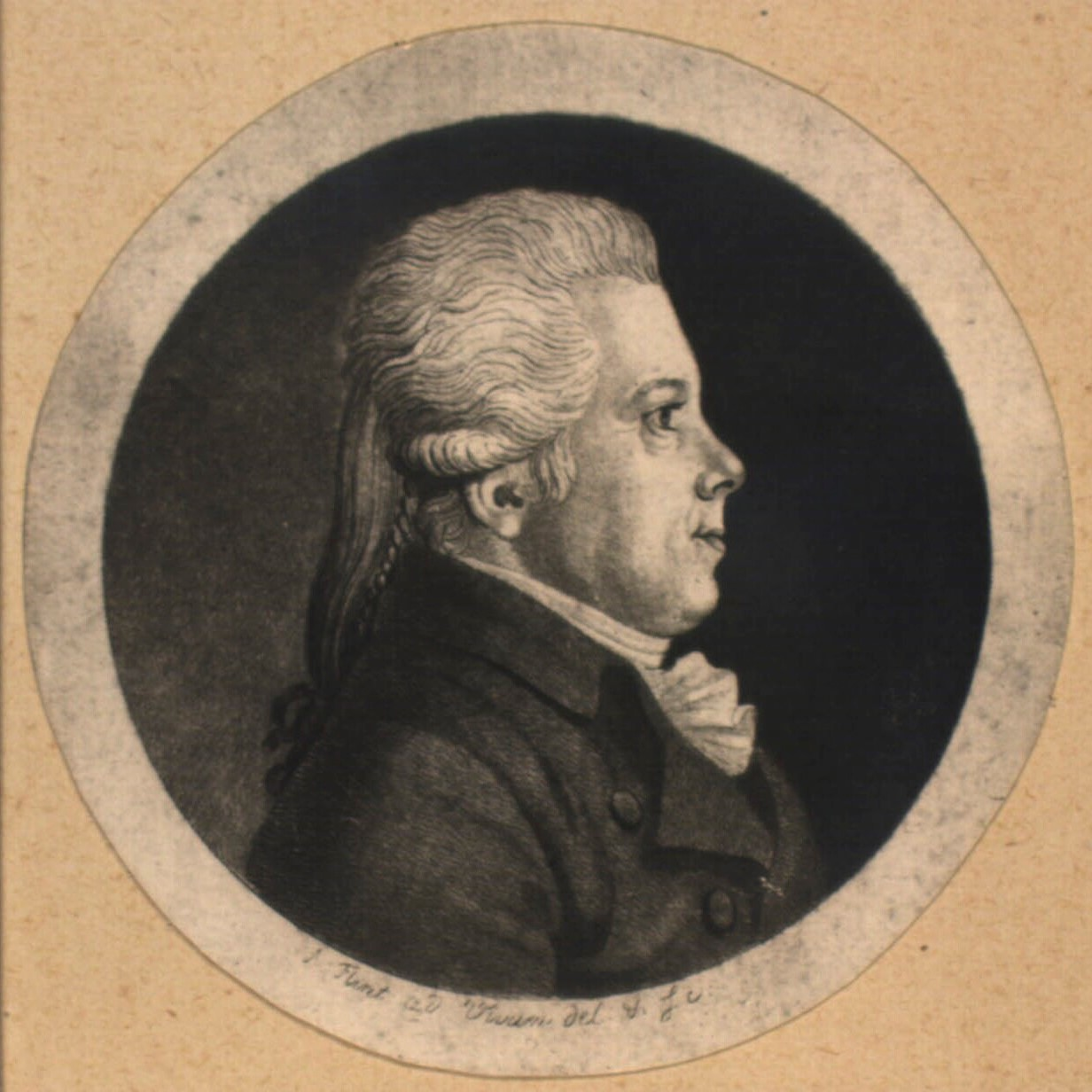
Peter Rabeholm..

The property in Enhjørningens Bastion was listed in the new cadastre of 1756 as No. 389 and was still described as a fire site owned by justitsråd Krøyer at that time.

The property was later acquired by wine merchant Peder Rabe Rabeholm. He established a small beer brewery in the grounds. He resided in the Cort Adeler House in Strandgade.

The property was listed in the new cadastre of 1806 as No. 203. It was owned by Ingeborg Seiling at that time. She was the widow of merchant and ship-owner Johannes Seiling. They had resided in Skouboegade (No. 30, Frimand's Quarter) at the time of the 1787 census.

The double house at what is now Langebrogade 8-8A was constructed in 1802 and 1814.

=== Rabeshave Brewery ===
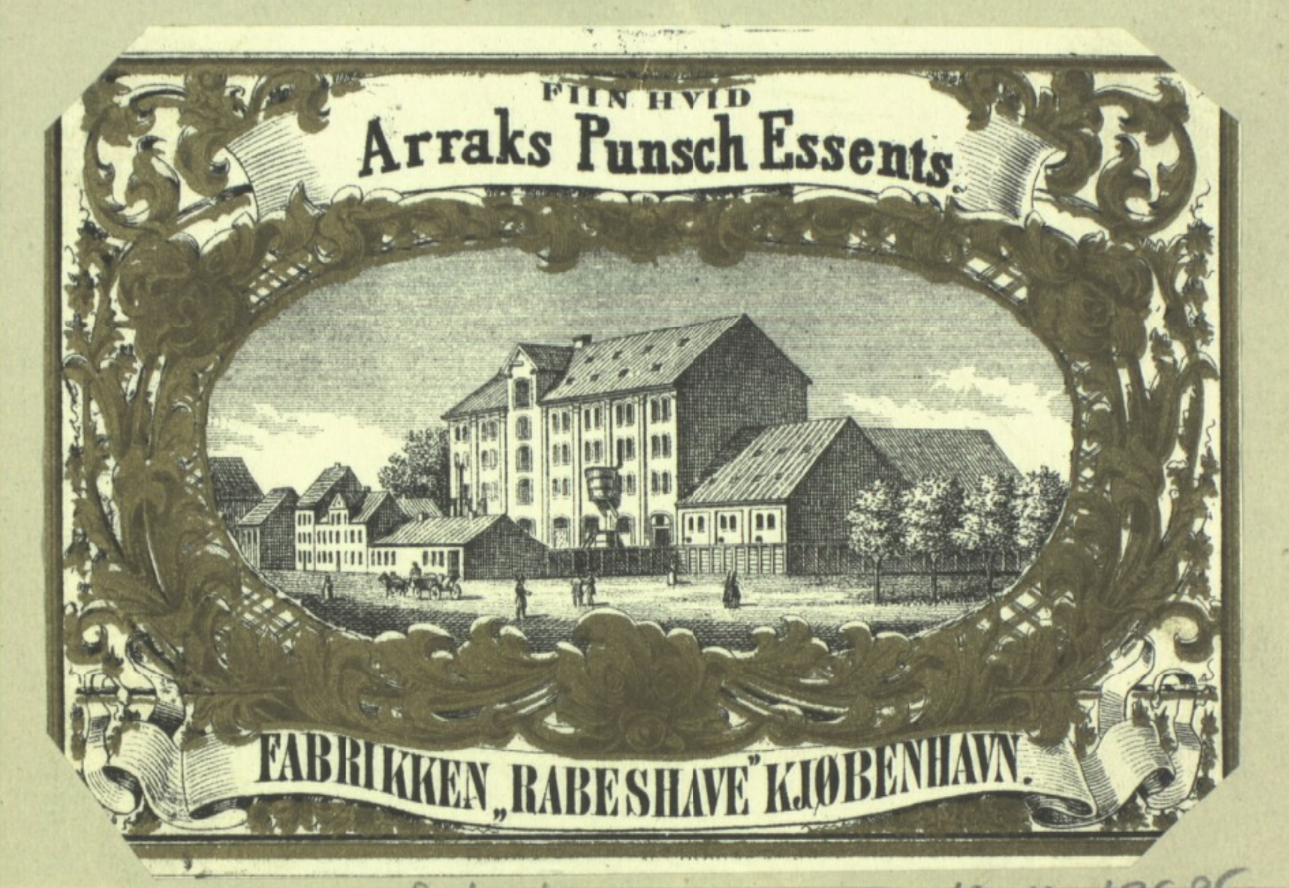
Advert for Rabeshave.

In 1851, No. 203 was divided into two separate properties. No. 203B (now Langebrogade 6) was used for the construction of a modern industrial brewery by Christian Ditlev Friedel (1817–1882)). Back in 1845, he had established a brewery in Glostrup. His new brewery in Langebrogade was one of the most modern in the city. It was a four-storey building complex and was powered by steam engines.The count and former Minister of Foreign Affairs Frederik Marcus Knuth owned the adjacent property. In 1862, Friedel sold both his breweries to Knuth for 100,000 rigsdaler as part of a sale-and-lease back scheme. As part of the arrangement, Friedel would lease the two breweries from Knuth on a 20-year lease with an annual rent of 12,000 rigsdaler. A storage facility in Valby was also part of the agreement.

By 1855, Rabeshave Brewery had 55 employees. Its annual production value amounted to 50,000 rigsdaler from the beer production and another 40,000 rigsdaler from spirits production. Friedel's brewery had four employees and an annual production value of 8,000 rigsdaler. In comparison, Carlsberg had 14 employees and an annual production value of 55,000 rigsdaler. Friedel and his wife Mette had five children. The family moved from Glostrup to Christianshavn shortly after the opening of the new brewery.

In 185, Knuth was also involved in the establishment of the Sødring & Co. mineral water factory in partnership with Christopher Hansen Sødring (1822–1881). Knut contributed with the needed premises in Rabeshave in Christianshavn as well as up to 6,000 Danish rigsdaler in funding for the necessary materials and installationswhile Sødring according to their contract would be responsible for the daily operations of the enterprise.

The brewery was left in an uncertain situation when Fridel emigrated to America in 1855. It was subsequently sold to Knud Christian Hansen, one of Friedel's employees. Ge initially purchased the brewery in Glostrup from Knuth's heirs for 18,000 rigsdaler. The transaction was financed through he loan from Knuth's widow and Friedel's two daughters. In 1860, Hansen and Frederik Vilhelm Schytte went on to buy Rabeshave for 80,000 rigsdaler. Hansen owned 1/3 of the venture while Schytte owned the remaining 2/3 of it.

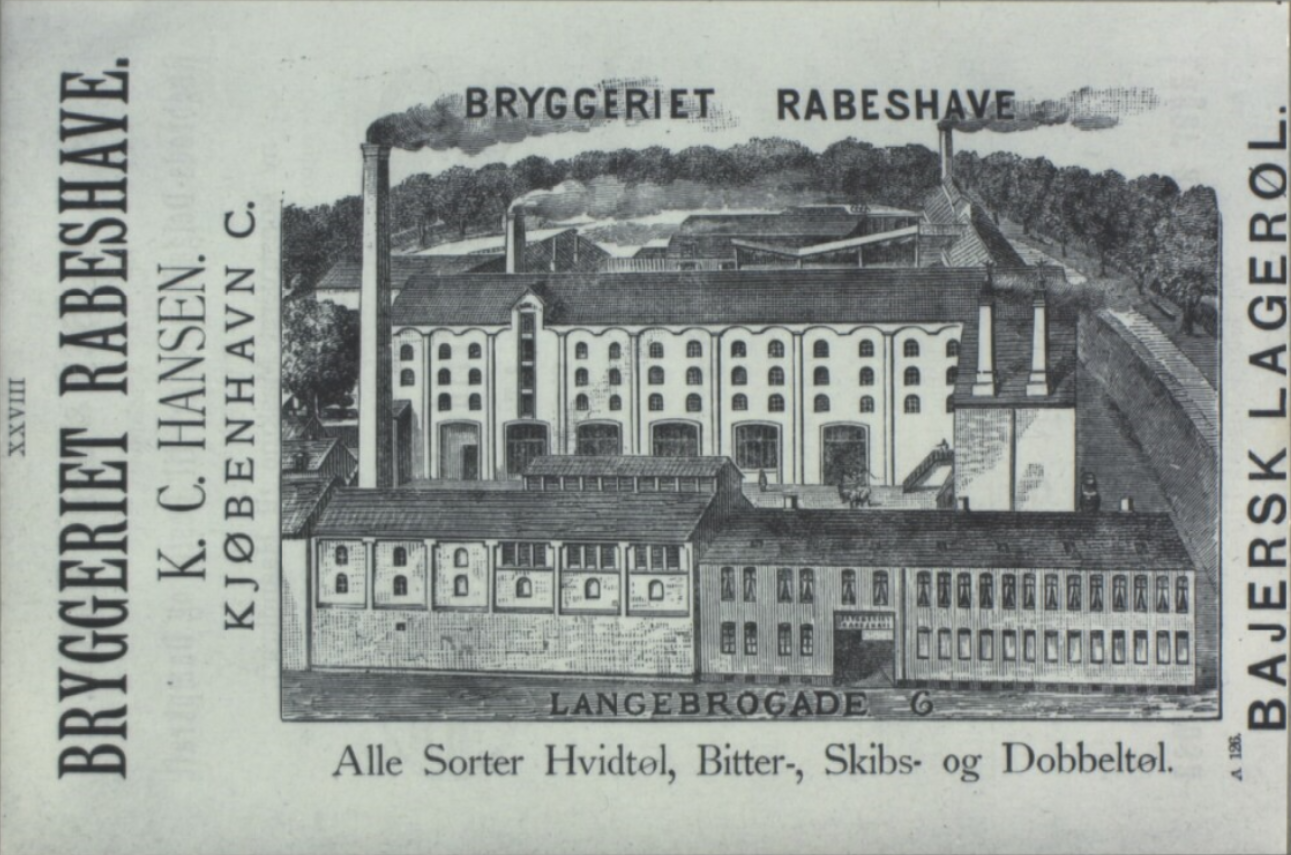
Advert for Rabeshave from the Nordic Exhibition of 1888.

From 1870 to 1879, Søren Anton van der Aa Kühle served as manager of Rabeshave Brewery. In 1870, K. C. Hansen moved from Glostrup yo Rabeshave. One year later he was married to Otine Vilhelmine Marie Olsen68. They had four children: Axel, Knud, Elisabeth Marie and Astrid (1879-). In around 1880 the family moved back to Glostrup. K. c. Hansen was one of the largest landowners in Glostrup as well as the owner of Ballerup Inn and property in Copenhagen. In partnership with Schytte he purchased Tavnsborg in Nørrebro. They converted it into a theatre with the actor Ferdinand Schmidt as artistic director, renaming it Nørrebros Theater.

In 1885, K. C. Hansen bourght Schytte's share of the brewery. The family then moved back to Raveshave, where they remained until K.C. Hansen's death in 1892. In 1891, Rabeshave merged with 11 other breweries under the name De Forenede Bryggerier. The production of beer at Rabeshave continued until 1904.

=== J. Wiedemann and Steff ===
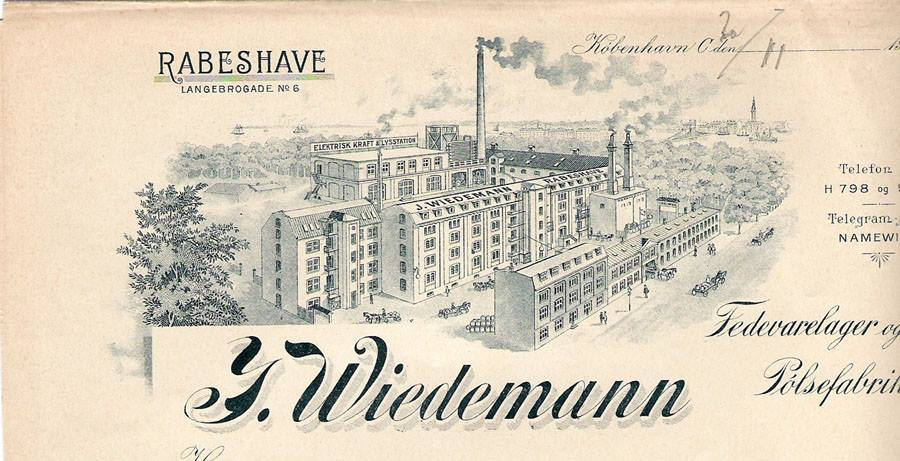
Advert for Rabeshave.

In 1905–07, J. Wiedemann constructed a new sausage factory on the site. The company was founded as an ordinary høker shop in Vognmagergade (No. 16) on 21 October 1876 by Andreas Johannes Wiedemann 1853–1926). In 1893, he established a sausage factory at Sankt Gertruds Stræde 5. In 1900, it was moved to larger premises at Nørregade 35. It was this sausage factory that was now moved to Langebrogade.

Wiedemann's sausages were sold from a fleet of sausage carts. His daughter Hedvig (Hedvig Wiedemann Høstl) studied painting under Gustav Vermehren. She married the painter Oluf Høst in 1013. Her wealthy father rented a house for them in Dragær.

Eiedemann's company was after his death in 1927 continued by his son Knud Johannes Wiedemann (1885-).

== Architecture ==
The 10-bays-long building is constructed in brick with three storeys over a walk-out basement. The two main entrances are located in the third and seventh bay. The widows ha ve cast iron sills. The pitched red tile roof is pierced by four robust brick chimneys.

== Today ==
Restant Rabes Have in the bas3ement of No. 8A is a traditional Danish lunch restaurant. The building contains two times two residential apartments on each of the upper floors.

== Gallery ==
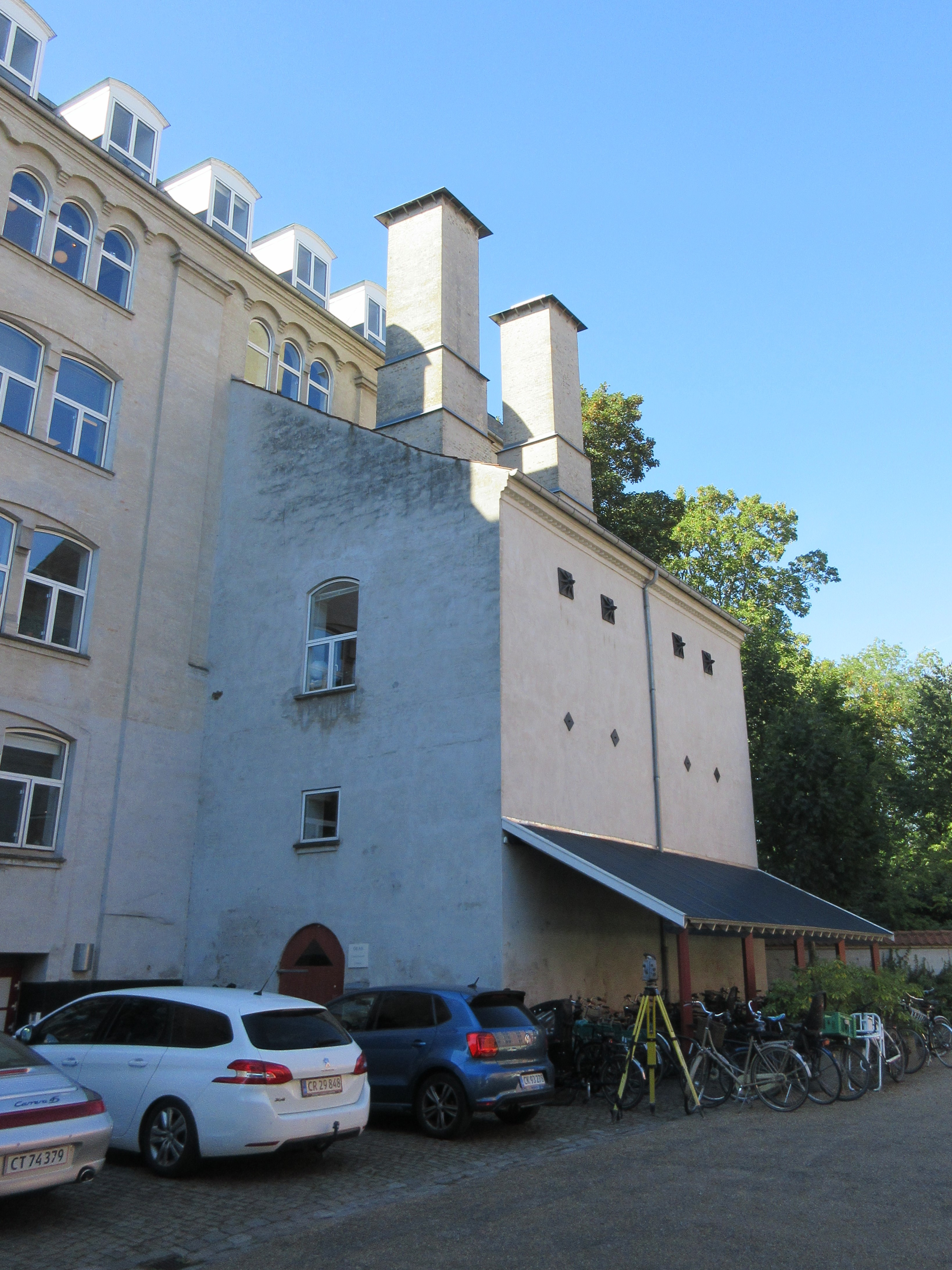
Langebrogade 6

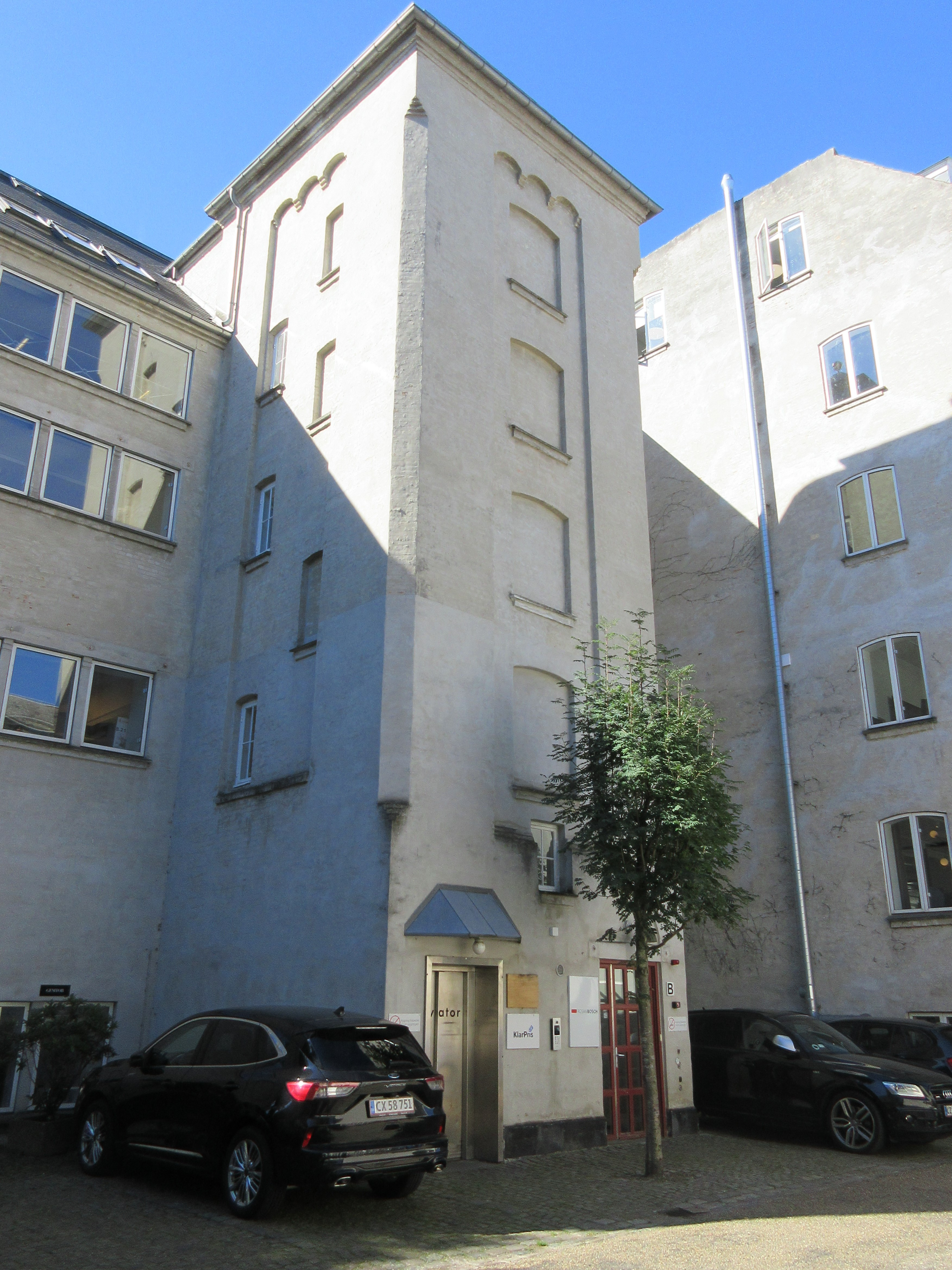
Æangebrogade 6

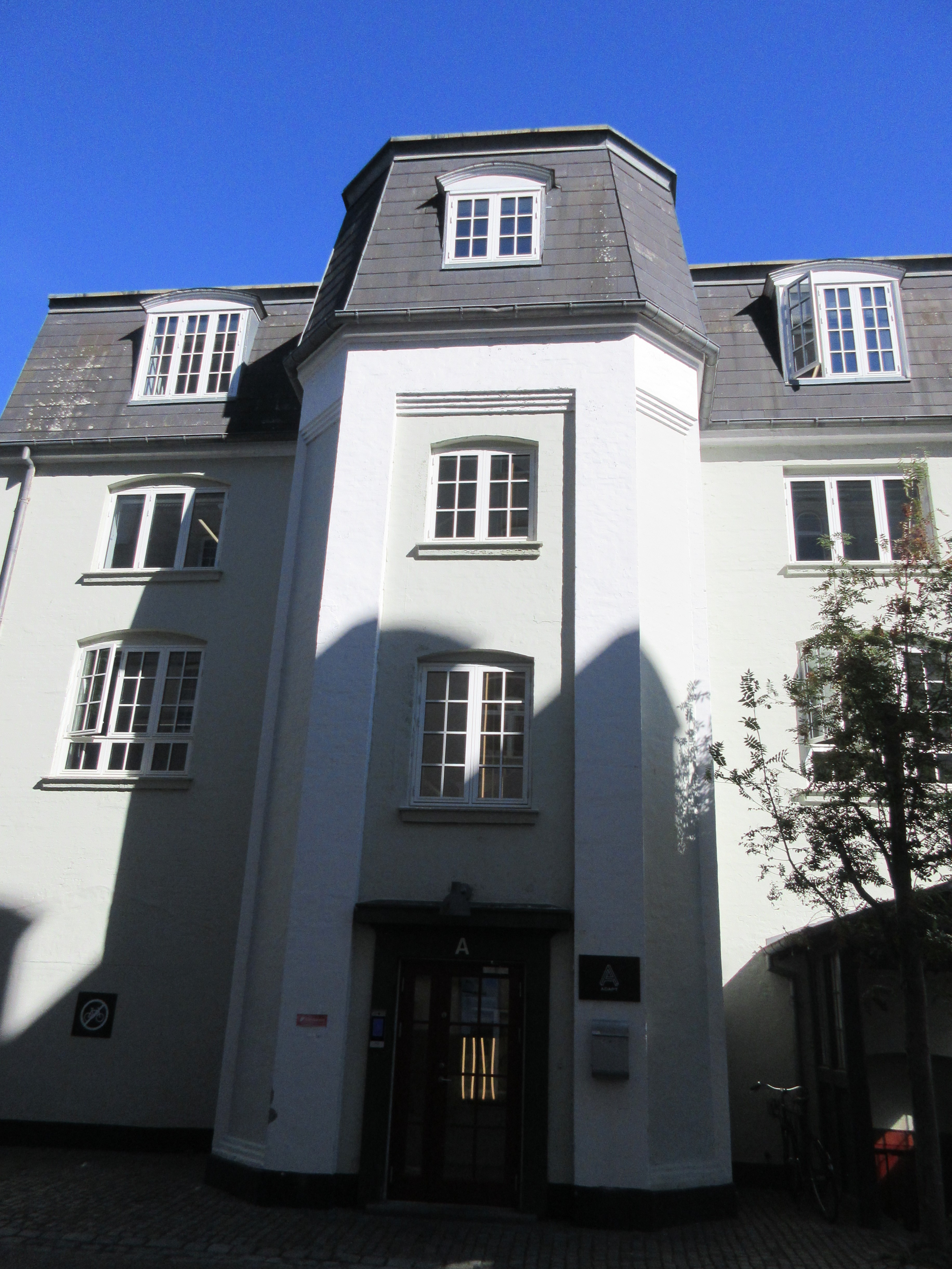
Langebrogade 6

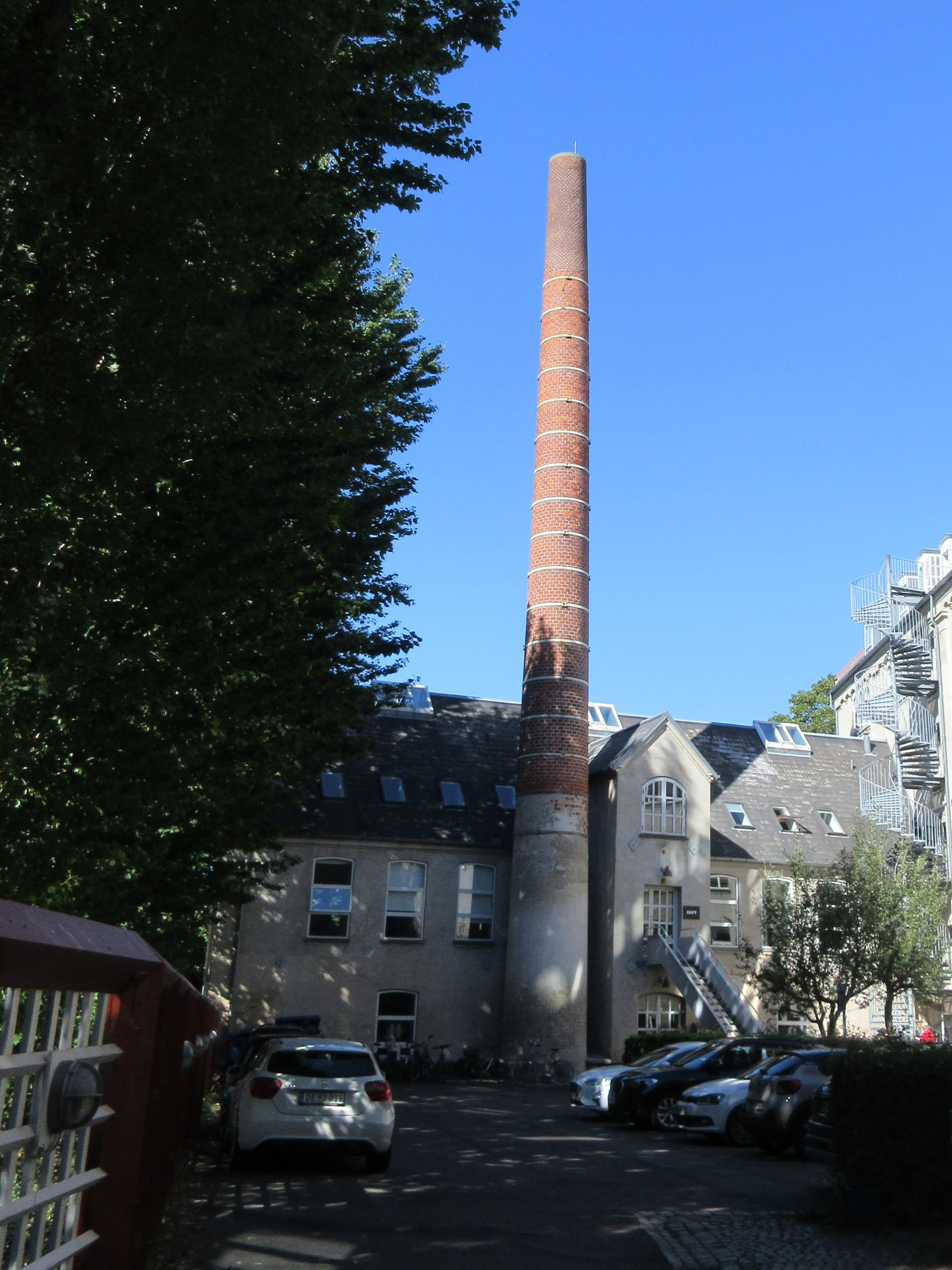
Langebrogade 6

== See also ==
- Rahbeks Allé Brewery
