= Tvedes Bryggeri =

Brewery in Copenhagen, Denmark

Coordinates: 55°40′14″N 12°32′30″E

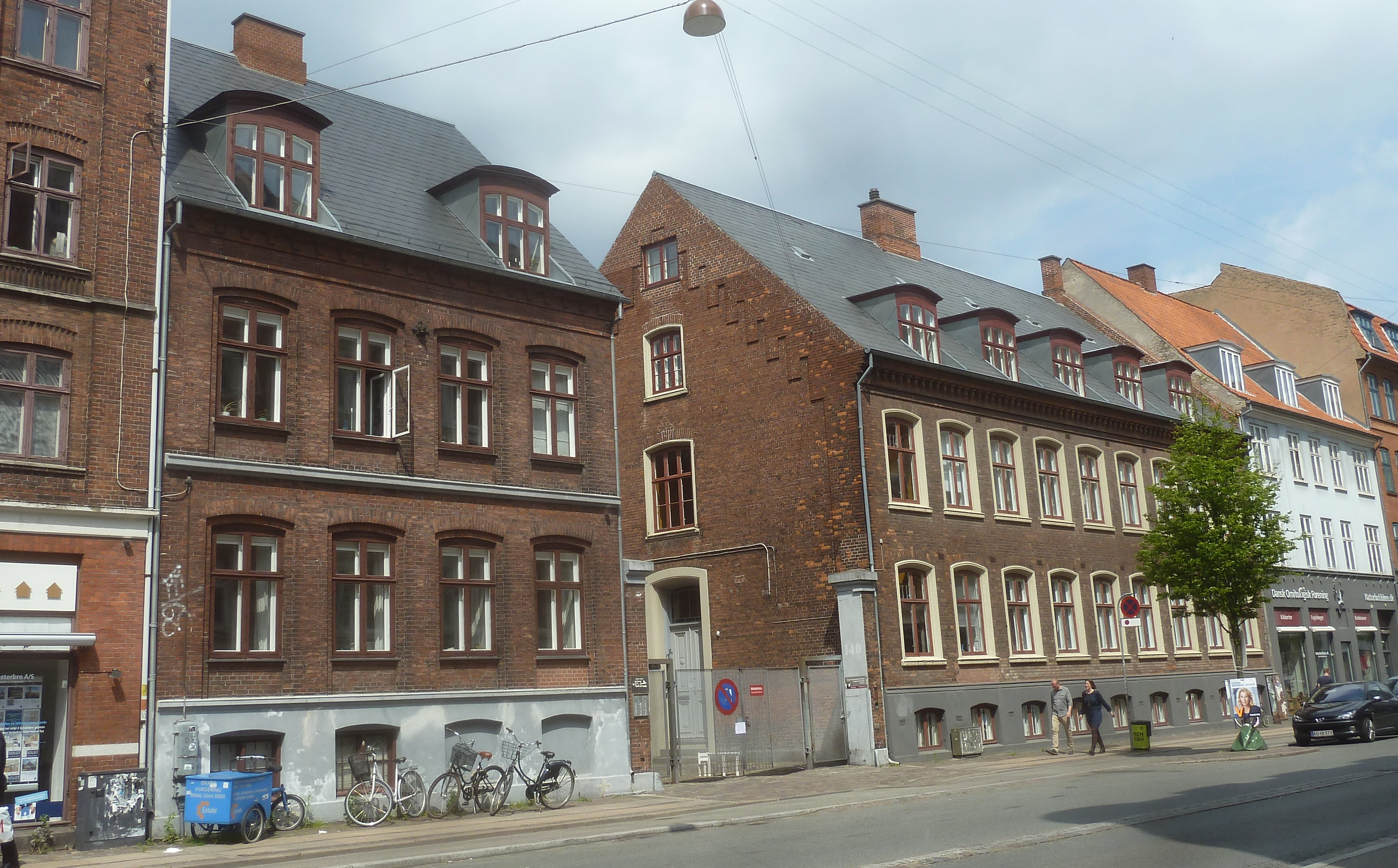
Tvede's Brewery today

Tvedes Bryggeri (Danish: Tvede's Brewery) was a brewery on Vesterbrogade in Copenhagen, Denmark. Founded by Hans Jørgen Tvede in 1852, it became the largest Nordic producer of small beer in the 1880s prior to its merger with several other breweries under the name De Forenede Bryggerier (United Breweries) in 1891. Its buildings were converted into apartments in the 1990s. The two buildings that front the street (No. 140 and 152) are heritage listed.

== History ==
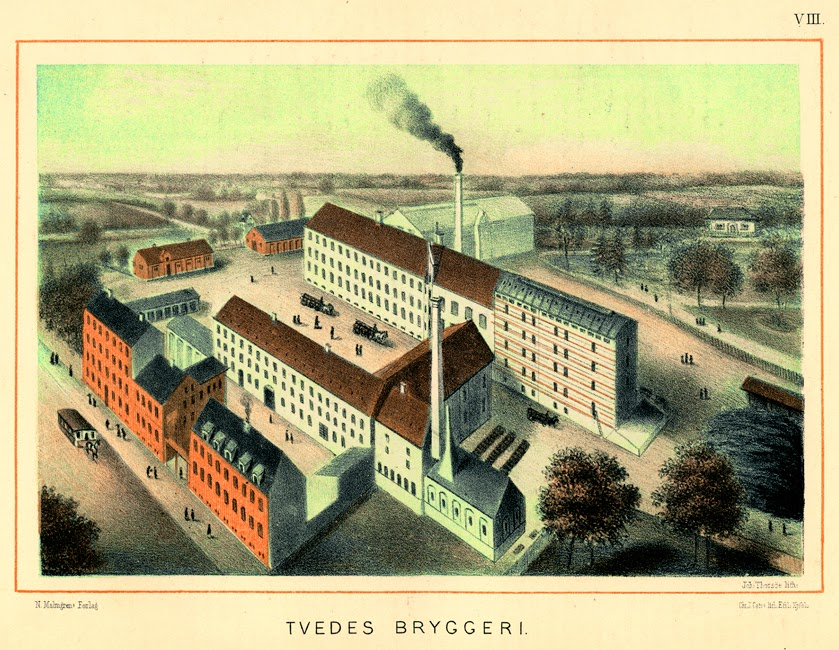
Tvede's Brewery in c. 1888, illustration from Danmarks industrielle Etablissementer

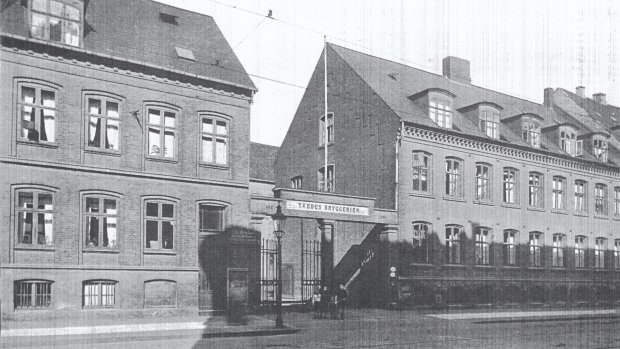
Tvede's Brewery viewed from Vesterbrogade in about 1920Kastellet

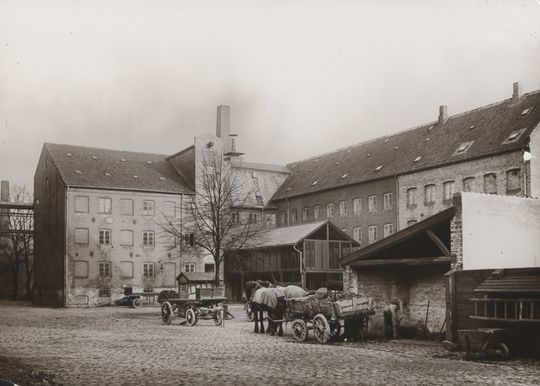
The courtyard at Tvede's Brewert in the 1910s

Hans Jørgen Tvede (1815-1878) was a builder of profession but his grandfather had owned a distillery on Gråbrødretorv and his father managed a brewery in Grønnegade. Tvede had also experience with brewing of beer from Ørholm Mølle, which he had rented for some ten years before acquiring a lot on Vesterbrogade in Copenhagen in 1851 to set up a new brewery. The first beer was produced the following year. The enterprise was an immediate success and he soon acquired more land on both sides of his brewery.

Im 1868, Tvede took his son-in-law J. H. Bruhn (1847-) as a partner. In 1872 and 1877, Tvede's sons Jørgen Christian Tvede (1850-1909) Peter Valdemar Tvede (1856-) were also made partners. 

After Tvede's death in 1878, Tvede's Brewery was continued with his two sons and son-in-law as management. In the 1880s, it became the largest producer of small beer in Scandinavia.

The introduction of a tax on beer in 1881 put the Danish beer market under pressure. Instigated by Carl Frederik Tietgen, Tvedes Bryggeri merged with several other breweries in Copenhagen to form De Forende Bryggerier (The United Breweries). Both Jørgen Christian Tvede and Jørgen Henrik Bruhn served on the board of the new company until 1905. The production site on Vesterbrogade remained in use until 1899 when production of small beer moved to nearby Rahbæks Allé.

== Today ==
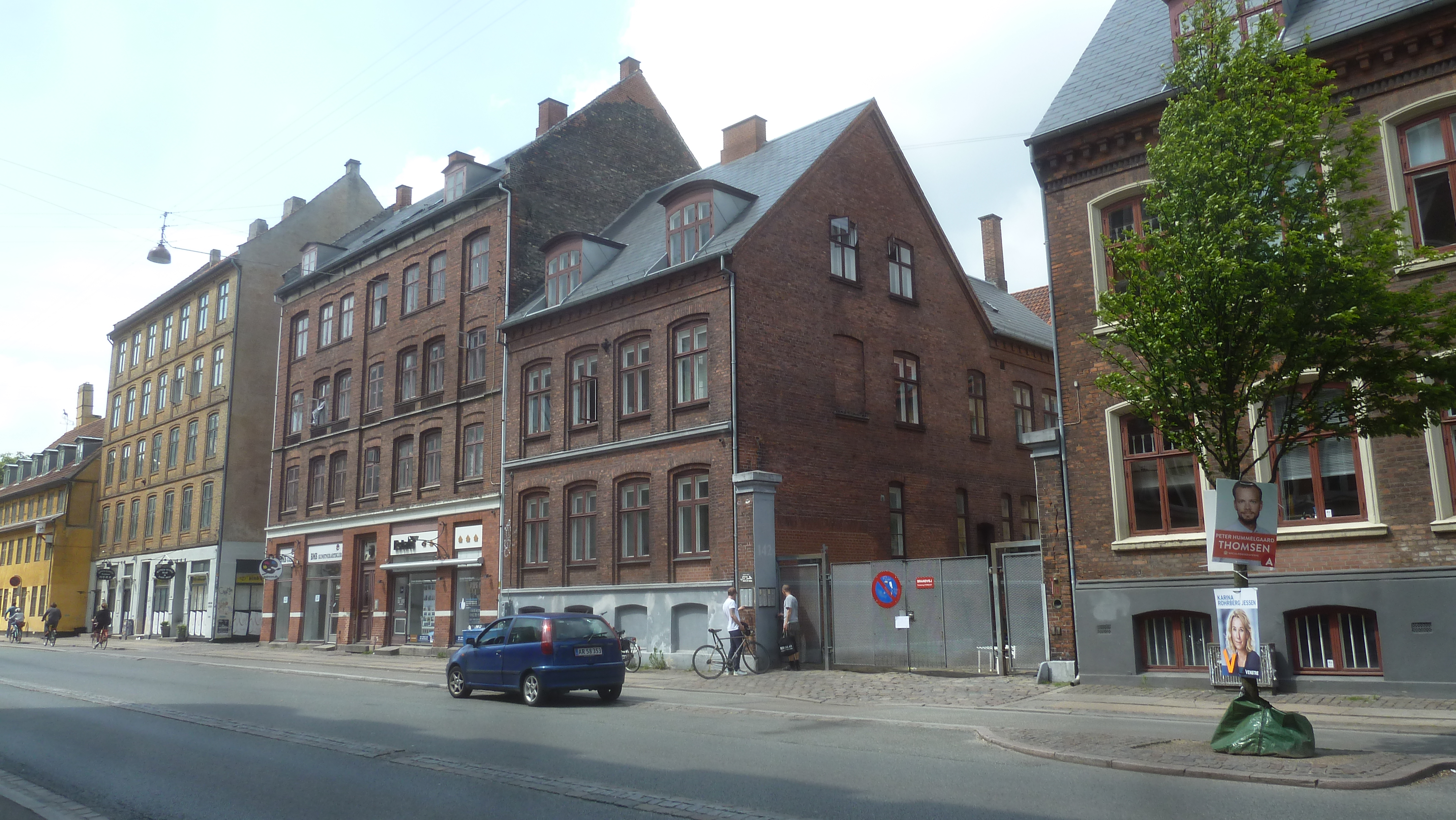
Tvede's Brewery today

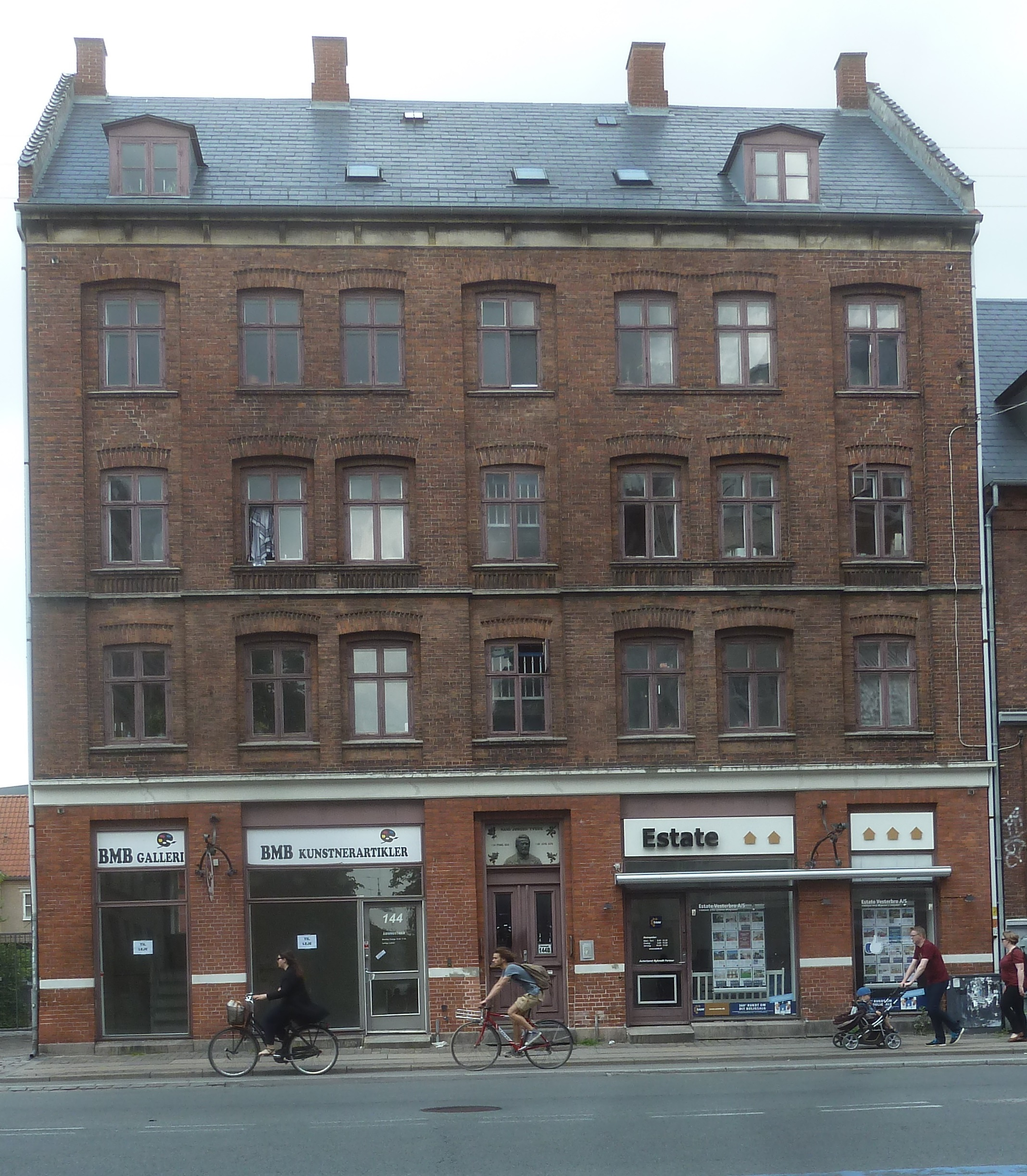
Christen Vestbergs og Jørgen Tvedes Stiftelse

The two buildings on Vesterbrogade were listed in 1980. Built in 1862, Tvede lived in No. 142. No. 140 has a rear wing which was built in 1884 to a design by Christian Laurits Thuren. The architect Kristian Isager was responsible for the conversion of the buildings into apartments in 1992–93. The buildings were at that point owned by Dyrlægernes og Agronomernes Pensionskasser but converted into an andelsboligforening in 2005.

The production buildings on the rear are not listed but are registered as "worthy of preservation" (bevaringsværdige). About half of the brewery was originally located on the other side of Vester Fælledvej (in Frederiksberg Municipality). This part of the buildings has been demolished.

== Christen Vestbergs og Jørgen Tvedes Stiftelse ==
In the cellar of his brewery, Hans Jørgen Tvede opened the Vesterbro Samaritan where people in need could get a meal. On 10 August 1878, Hans Jørgen Tvede and his wife Birgitte Frederikke Tvede née Vestberg founded Christen Vestbergs og Jørgen Tvedes Stiftelse. A building with residences for men and women in need was completed at Vesterbrogade 144 in 1870. A plaque with a portrait relief above the door commemorates Tvede.

== See also ==
- Jens Levin Tvede
