= List of tallest buildings in Denmark =

This is a list of tallest buildings in Denmark. All buildings over 75 m (246 ft) are listed.

== Completed buildings ==
Was the tallest building in denmark upon completion

Rank	Name	Image	Year	Height	Location	Notes
1	Lighthouse		2022	142.6 m (468 ft)	Aarhus	Denmark's tallest completed building; 43 floors
2	Pasteurs Tower		2022	128 m (420 ft)	Copenhagen	The tallest building in Copenhagen; 37 floors
3	Herlev Hospital		1976	120 m (394 ft)	Herlev	Joint 26th tallest hospital in the world.
4	Christiansborg Palace		1928	106 m (348 ft)	Copenhagen	Home to the Danish parliament, Prime Minister's Office and the Supreme Court.
5	Copenhagen City Hall		1905	105.6 m (346 ft)	Copenhagen	
6	Domus Vista		1969	102 m (335 ft)	Frederiksberg	
7	Bohrs Tower		2016	100 m (328 ft)	Copenhagen	22 upper floors: Residential. Lower floors: Part of UCC Campus Carlsberg.
8	Nordbro		2019	99.9 m (328 ft)	Copenhagen	Residential building with 30 floors
9	Aarhus Cathedral		1300; 726 years ago	96 m (315 ft)	Aarhus	Cathedral in Aarhus. Tallest church in Denmark.
10=	St. Nicolas' Church		1591/1912	94 m (308 ft)	Copenhagen	Former church now used as an exhibition building.
10=	Aarhus City Tower		2010	94 m (308 ft)	Aarhus	Modernist-style building containing a hotel, offices and the owners apartment on the two top floors.
12=	Church of Our Saviour		1752; 274 years ago	91 m (299 ft)	Copenhagen	Used since its erection as a parish church.
12=	Avedøreværket		2001; 25 years ago	91 m (299 ft)	Copenhagen / Hammerholmen	Power Station.
12=	Church of the Holy Ghost		1409; 617 years ago	91 m (299 ft)	Copenhagen	Parish church.
14	Carlsberg Group Headquarters		1962/1997	88 m (289 ft)	Copenhagen	Tallest building in Copenhagen Municipality. Originally built as a silo, then later converted into offices. Was the international headquarters of Carlsberg Group. Demolished in 2021.
15	Radisson Blu Scandinavia Hotel		1973	86 m (282 ft)	Copenhagen	The tallest modern hotel in Denmark.
16=	Crowne Plaza Copenhagen Towers		2009	85 m (279 ft)	Copenhagen	When completed, contained the largest solar PV system in Scandinavia.
16=	Copenhagen Towers – North Tower		2015	85 m (279 ft)	Copenhagen	When completed, contained the largest solar PV system in Scandinavia.
18=	Frederik's Church		1894	80 m (262 ft)	Copenhagen	Construction started in the mid-18th century as part of Frederiksstaden but not completed until 1894 to a modified design
18=	Public		2002	80 m (262 ft)	Copenhagen	Former international headquarters of Ferring Pharmaceuticals.
20	St. Peter's Church		1757; 269 years ago	78 m (256 ft)	Copenhagen	Church for German congregation.
21=	AC Hotel Bella Sky Copenhagen Tower 1		2011	76.5 m (251 ft)	Copenhagen	One of two towers with an inclination of 15° in opposite directions. This means that each tower leans 20 metres from the base to the top.
21=	AC Hotel Bella Sky Tower 2		2011	76.5 m (251 ft)	Copenhagen	A sky bridge connects this tower to Tower 1 at the top floor.
23	Rigshospitalet		1970	75 m (246 ft)	Copenhagen	A helipad, along with an extended lift tower, were established on top of the main building in 2007, increasing the total height by 5 metres.
24=	Ceres Panorama		2016	75 m (246 ft)	Aarhus	Residential building in the CeresByen neighbourhood.
24=	Maersk Tower		2017	75 m (246 ft)	Copenhagen	

== Buildings under construction or proposed ==
Name	Year	Height	Location	Notes
Mindet 6	2027	145.35 m (477 ft)	Aarhus	41 floors
Sky Tower Hotel	Proposed	115 m (377 ft)	Aarhus	18 floors; expected to begin construction in 2022.
Sydhavnskvarteret Zone B	2024	112 m (367 ft)	Aarhus	Under construction in the redevelopment of Sydhavnskvarteret.
Postbyen Tower 1	2024	107 m (351 ft)	Copenhagen	29 floors.
Frederiks Plads (Tower F)	2025	101 m (331 ft)	Aarhus	Residential building in Indre By
Høffdings Tårn	2024	100 m (328 ft)	Copenhagen	Under construction in the Carlsberg district.
La Tour	2022	94 m (308 ft)	Aarhus	28 floors; under construction.
Postbyen Tower 2	2024	86 m (282 ft)	Copenhagen	15 floors.
Njalstårnet	2021	86 m (282 ft)	Copenhagen	Unfinished and currently abandoned due to building fraud
Vogelius Tårn	2022	80 m (262 ft)	Copenhagen	Under construction in the Carlsberg district.
Carls Tårn	2024	80 m (262 ft)	Copenhagen	Planned for construction in the Carlsberg district.
Beckmanns Tårn	2024	80 m (262 ft)	Copenhagen	Planned for construction in the Carlsberg district.
Dahlerups Tårn	2021	80 m (262 ft)	Copenhagen	23 floors; under construction in the Carlsberg district.
AU Arts and Business Building	2028	80 m (262 ft)	Aarhus	Building for the arts department of Aarhus University
INCUBA Next	2024	80 m (262 ft)	Aarhus	Highrise in Katrinebjerg.
Cactus Tower 1	2022	80 m (262 ft)	Copenhagen	18 floors. Under construction.
Sydhavnskvarteret Zone D	Approved	80 m (262 ft)	Aarhus	Approved for the redevelopment of Sydhavnskvarteret.
Hotel designed by Bjarke Ingels Group	2024	76 m (249 ft)	Aarhus	Approved for construction in Aarhus Ø.
TRÆ	2024	75 m (246 ft)	Aarhus	Under construction in the redevelopment of Sydhavnskvarteret.
Byporten	2022	75 m (246 ft)	Aarhus	Residential building in the Tilst suburb

== See also ==
- List of tallest buildings in Copenhagen
- List of tallest structures in Denmark
- List of tallest buildings in Scandinavia
- List of tallest buildings in Europe
- Tallest buildings in the world
