= List of tallest buildings in Copenhagen =

Skyline of Copenhagen Københavns skyline
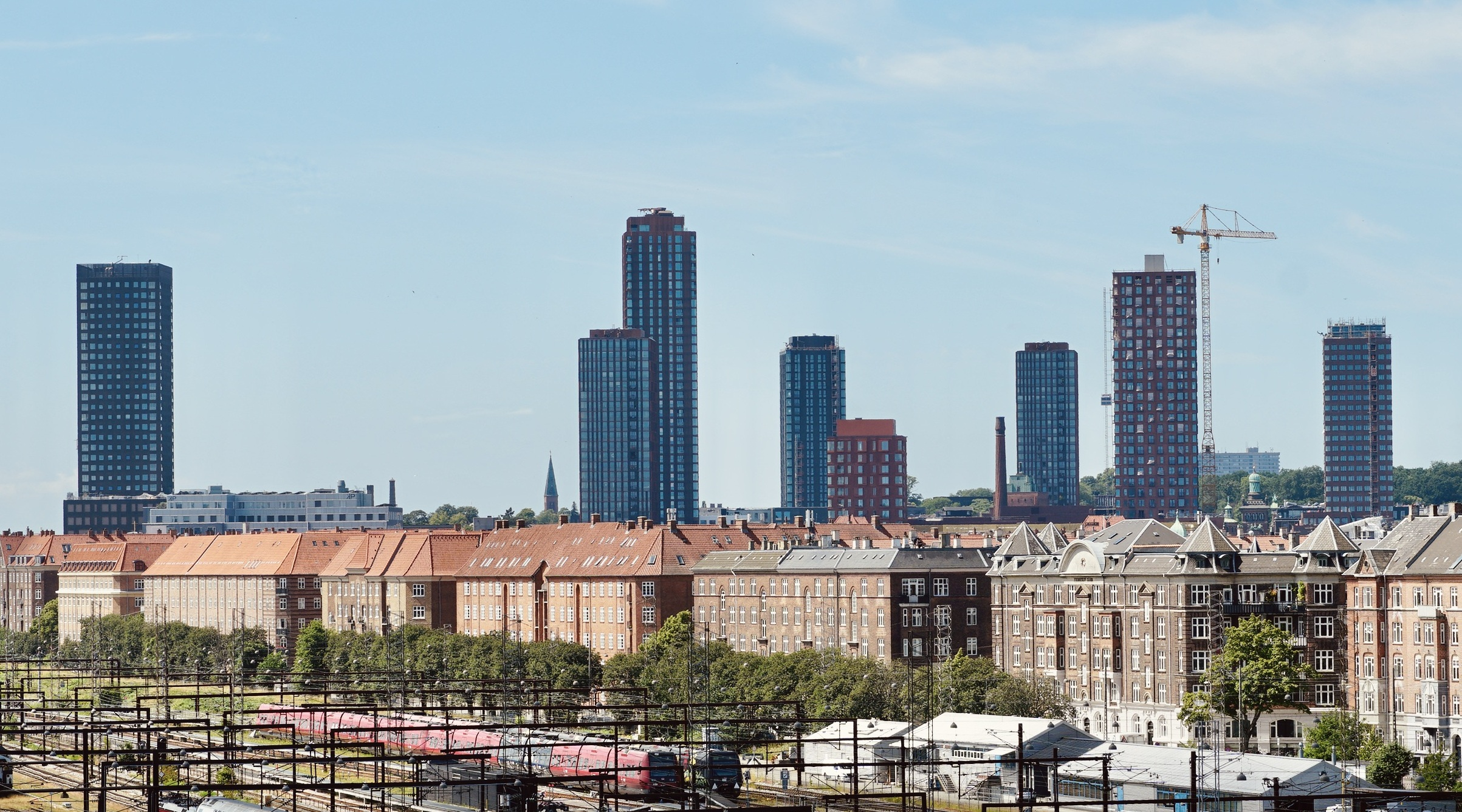
- High-rises in Carlsberg in 2024
- Tallest building: Pasteur's Tårn (2022)
- Tallest building height: 126.2 m (414 ft)

Number of tall buildings (2026)
- Taller than 75 m (246 ft): 16
- Taller than 100 m (328 ft): 4

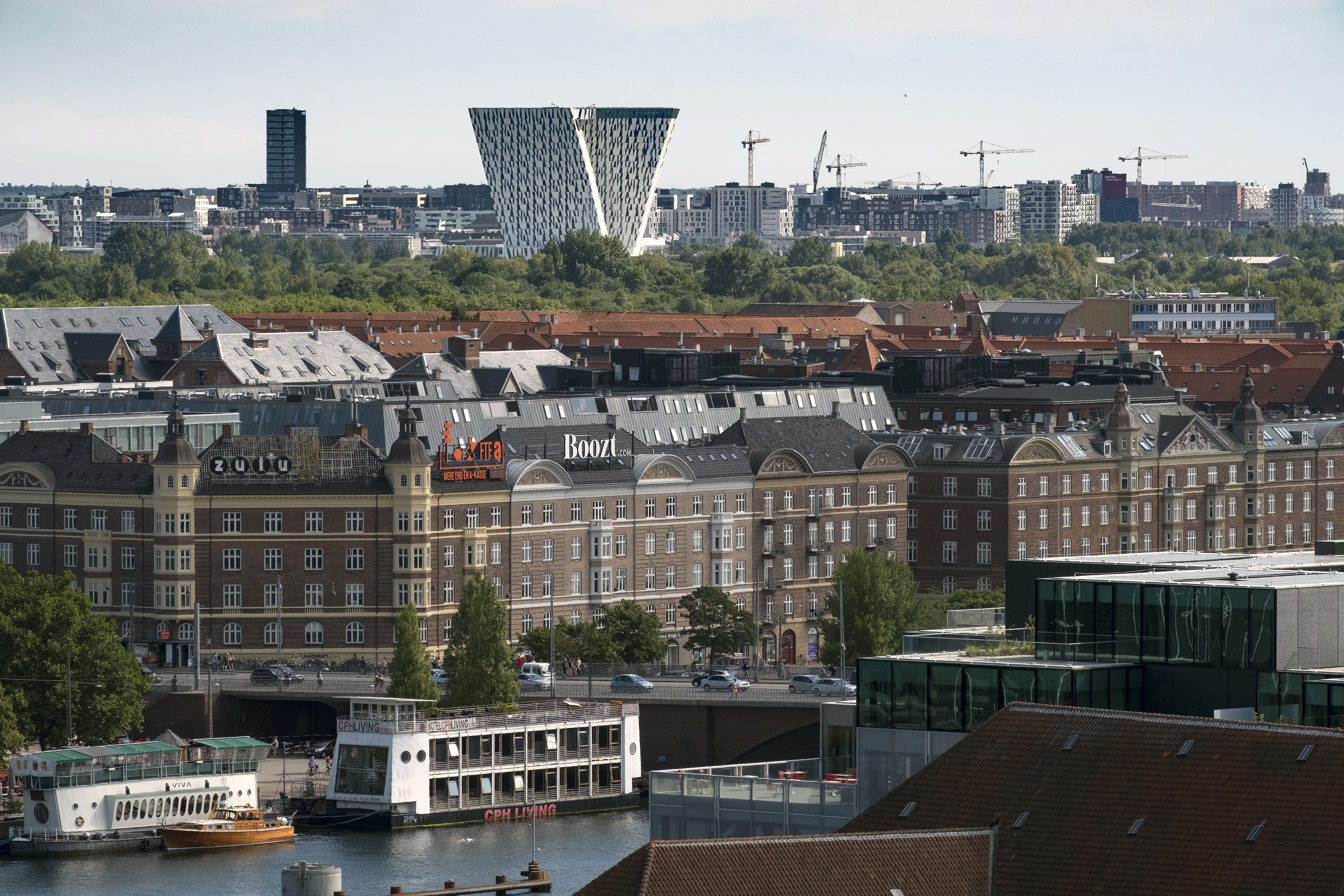
Skyline of Ørestad

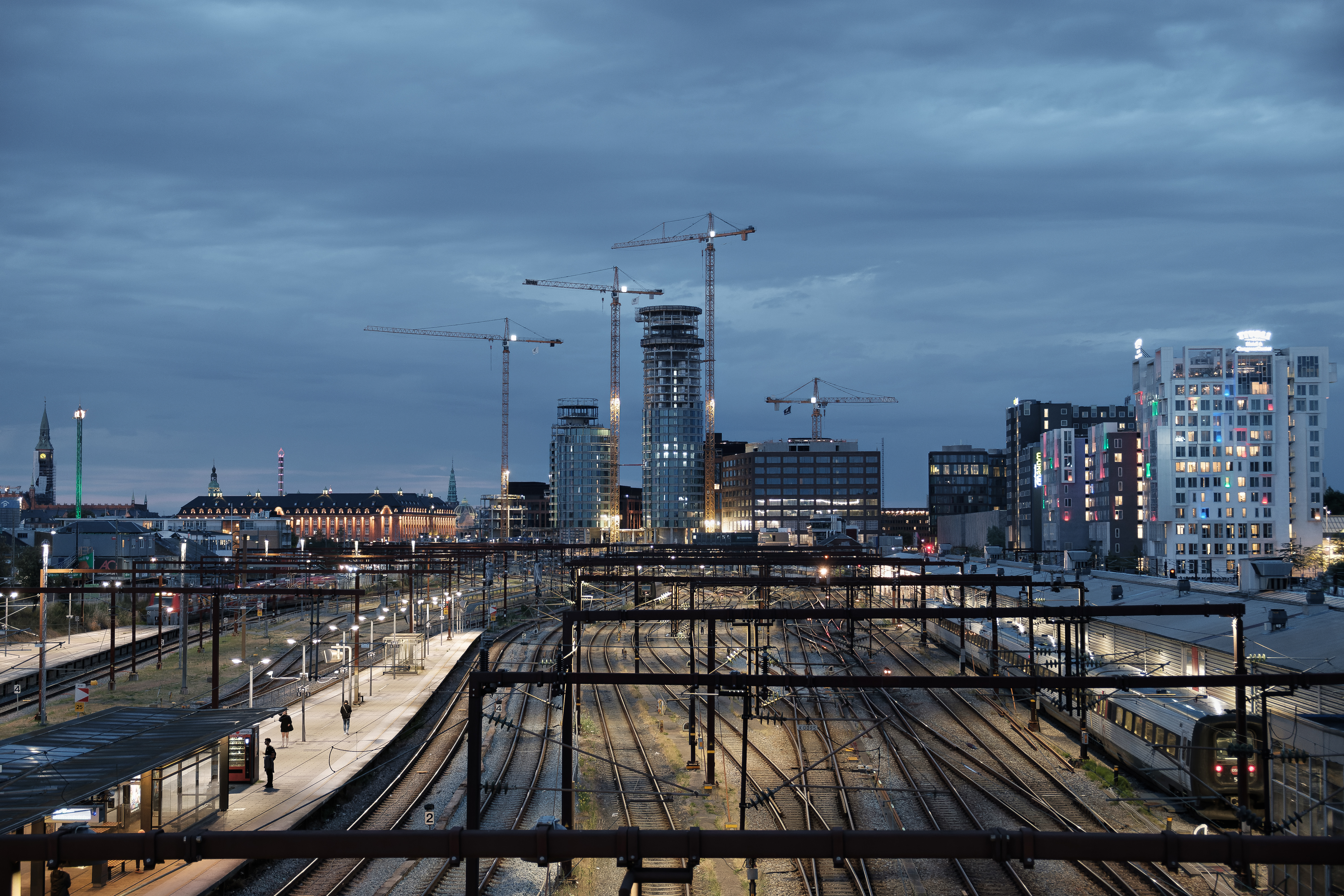
Construction on Postbyen at night in 2023

Copenhagen is the capital and most populous city of Denmark, with an urban area population of 1.4 million. Copenhagen is home to over a hundred high-rise structures, 16 of which stand taller than 75 metres (246 ft) as of 2026. Of those, four buildings reach a height of 100 m (328 ft). Since 2022, the tallest building in Copenhagen has been Pasteur's Tårn (Danish for Pasteur's Tower), a 126 m (414 ft) tall, 37-storey mixed-use building. Despite Copenhagen being the largest city in Denmark, Pasteur's Tårn is only the second tallest building in the country, after the 143 m (468 ft) Lighthouse in Aarhus.

The history of high-rise buildings in Copenhagen began after World War II, when a housing shortage and modernist ideas led to the construction of some of the first high-rises in Denmark. The Bellahøj Houses in Brønshøj, built in the early 1950s, became a symbol of post-war modernity. Consisting of 28 towers of up to 13 storeys, the complex applied the principle of building in height to free up green areas. The SAS Royal Hotel, built in 1960, is considered an icon of Danish modernism. Residential high-rises were built in the suburbs as part of large housing projects, such as Høje Gladsaxe and Brøndby Strand Parkerne. In addition, two buildings surpassing 100 m (328 ft) were built in the city's wider urban area: the 120 m (394 ft) tall Herlev Hospital in Herlev, and the 102 m (335 ft) tall Domus Vista in Frederiksberg.

The early 21st century has seen substantial growth in the number of tall buildings in Copenhagen, especially since the 2010s. The new area of Ørestad has been a site of notable high-rise development. There, the Copenhagen Towers project introduced two new high-rises, including a Crown Plaza hotel. The Bella Sky hotel, comprising two inclined towers connected on the roof, was completed in Ørestad in 2011. Most notable, however, was the redevelopment of the Carlsberg area in central Copenhagen after the closure of the Carlsberg brewery there in 2008. The area is planned to have nine high-rise buildings upon completion. Bohr's Tårn was completed there in 2016, becoming the tallest building in Copenhagen and the first to exceed 100 m (328 ft) in height. It was surpassed by Pasteur's Tårn in the same area in 2022. Another major development, Postbyen, features five cylindrical buildings and was constructed in the 2020s. The Kaktus Towers, featuring staggered balconies that resemble cacti, were completed in 2022.

While Carlsberg has emerged as Copenhagen's main cluster of tall buildings, high-rise construction has also spread to other industrial areas such as Nordhavn and Sydhavnen in the 2010s. There have been several cases of adaptive reuse in the city, such as the conversion of a former grain silo to an apartment building named The Silo and the similar conversion of Portland Towers in Nordhavn. Besides the city's high-rises, the tallest structures in Copenhagen include the towers of Christiansborg Palace and Copenhagen City Hall, both of which reach slightly over 100 m (328 ft) in height.

== History ==
Number of buildings by height in Copenhagen by the end of each year, based on the information in this article. This takes into account the conversion of Carlsberg Hovedkontor from a silo to a habitable building in 1997, and its later demolition in 2021. Click on the legend to toggle a specific height on or off. View chart definition.

== Map of tallest buildings ==
The map below shows the locations of buildings taller than 75 m (246 ft) in Copenhagen. Each marker is numbered by the building's height rank, and coloured by the decade of its completion.

Buildings taller than 75 m (246 ft) in Copenhagen.
- 1970s
- 1980s
- 1990s
- 2000s
- 2010s
- 2020s
1 Pasteur's Tårn
2 Postbyen Apartment Towers 1
3 Bohr's Tårn
4 Høffdings Tårn
5 Nordbro
6 Radisson SAS Scandinavia
7 Crowne Plaza
8 Edyn Postbyen Tower 1
9 Dahlerups Tårn
10 Vogelius Tårn
11 Copenhagen Tower North Tower
12 Public
13 Beckmanns Tårn
14 Bella Sky Tower 1
15 Bella Sky Tower 2
16 Maersk Tower

== Tallest buildings ==
This list ranks completed buildings in Copenhagen that stand at least 75 m (246 ft) tall as of 2026, based on standard height measurement. This includes spires and architectural details but does not include antenna masts. The “Year” column indicates the year of completion. Buildings tied in height are sorted by year of completion with earlier buildings ranked first, and then alphabetically. This list only includes buildings located within the Copenhagen municipality.

Was the tallest building in Copenhagen upon completion

Rank	Name	Image	Location	Height m (ft)	Floors	Year	Purpose	Notes
1	Pasteur's Tårn		55°39′55″N 12°32′01″E	126.2 (414)	37	2022	Mixed-use	Mixed-use residential and office building. Tallest building in Copenhagen since 2022. Tallest building completed in Copenhagen in the 2020s.
2	Postbyen Apartment Towers 1		55°40′09″N 12°34′05″E	106.5 (349)	29	2025	Residential	Part of the Postbyen complex.
3	Bohr's Tårn		55°39′50″N 12°32′07″E	105.8 (347)	30	2016	Mixed-use	Mixed-use residential, office, and educational building. Tallest building in Copenhagen from 2016 to 2022. Tallest building completed in Copenhagen in the 2010s. First building in Copenhagen to exceed 100 m (328 ft) in height. Named after Danish physicist Niels Bohr. The first eight floors are part of a larger complex that hosts the Campus Carlsberg for the University College of Copenhagen.
4	Høffdings Tårn		55°40′00″N 12°32′09″E	100 (328)	30	2024	Residential	
5	Nordbro		55°42′10″N 12°32′21″E	99.9 (328)	30	2019	Residential	
6	Radisson SAS Scandinavia		55°40′02″N 12°35′10″E	86 (282)	26	1973	Hotel	Tallest building in Copenhagen from 1973 to 1997, when the Carlsberg Hovedkontor was converted from a silo into a habitable building. Tallest building in Copenhagen completed in the 1970s.
7	Crowne Plaza		55°37′37″N 12°34′38″E	85 (279)	25	2009	Hotel	Part of the Copenhagen Towers complex.
8	Edyn Postbyen Tower 1		55°40′08″N 12°34′04″E	84.9 (279)	23	2025	Hotel	Part of the Postbyen complex.
9	Dahlerups Tårn		55°40′00″N 12°31′53″E	83.8 (275)	25	2021	Mixed-use	Mixed-use residential and office building. Named after Danish architect Vilhelm Dahlerup.
10	Vogelius Tårn		55°39′54″N 12°32′09″E	83.5 (274)	25	2022	Residential	
11	Copenhagen Tower North Tower		55°37′39″N 12°34′40″E	80.8 (265)	22	2015	Office	Also known as North Wing. Part of the Copenhagen Towers complex.
12	Public		55°37′45″N 12°34′49″E	80.2 (263)	20	2002	Office	Formerly known as Ferring International Center, Ferring Pharmaceuticals Headquarters, and Neroport. The tower served as an R&D centre for Ferring Pharmaceuticals until 2021, when it was sold to Genesta and rebranded to Public.
13	Beckmanns Tårn		55°40′02″N 12°32′05″E	80 (262)	22	2024	Residential	
14	Bella Sky Tower 1		55°38′22″N 12°34′43″E	76.5 (251)	24	2011	Hotel	A pair of tilted buildings with an inclination of 15° in opposite directions. Currently the AC Hotel Bella Sky Copenhagen, and formerly the Bella Sky Comwell Hotel.
15	Bella Sky Tower 2		55°38′21″N 12°34′40″E	76.5 (251)	24	2011	Hotel	A pair of tilted buildings with an inclination of 15° in opposite directions. Currently the AC Hotel Bella Sky Copenhagen, and formerly the Bella Sky Comwell Hotel.
16	Maersk Tower		55°41′35″N 12°33′48″E	75 (246)	16	2016	Education	Part of the University of Copenhagen, housing parts of the Faculty of Health and Medical Sciences. The façade is covered in 3,300 copper shutters, which creates a relief-like appearance.

== Tallest under construction or proposed ==
=== Under construction ===
The following table includes buildings under construction in Copenhagen that are planned to be at least 75 m (246 ft) tall as of 2026, based on standard height measurement. The “Year” column indicates the expected year of completion. Buildings that are on hold are not included.

Name	Height m (ft)	Floors	Year	Purpose	Notes
Bryggens Bastion Tower 1	99 (325)	31	2028	Residential	
Bryggens Bastion Tower 2	86 (282)	24	2028	Residential	Also known as Njals Tårn.

=== Proposed ===
The following table includes approved and proposed buildings in Copenhagen that are planned to be at least 75 m (246 ft) tall as of 2026, based on standard height measurement. The “Year” column indicates the expected year of completion. Buildings that are on hold are not included.

Name	Height m (ft)	Floors	Year	Purpose	Notes
Marmormolen/Langelinie Tower 1	120 (394)	36	–	Mixed-use	
Marmormolen/Langelinie Tower 2	80 (262)	20	–	Office	

== Tallest demolished ==
There has been one building that once stood taller than 75 m (246 ft) in Copenhagen and has since been demolished.

Name	Image	Height ft (m)	Floors	Year completed	Year demolished	Purpose	Notes
Carlsberg Hovedkontor		88 (289)	22	1997 (Note: The building was originally constructed as a silo in 1961. It was converted into a habitable building in 1997.)	2021	Office	The building was originally constructed as a silo in 1961. When the malting plant ceased production in 1994, the upper half of the silo and most of the malting plant building were adapted to house Carlsberg Group's administration and management. It thus served as the headquarters for the brewery from 1997 until the 2010s. The building was later demolished to make way for the redevelopment of the Carlsberg district. It was demolished floor-by-floor by Italian engineering contractor DESPE using a system known as TopDownWay.

== Timeline of tallest buildings ==
This lists buildings that once held the title of the tallest high-rise building in Copenhagen.

Name	Image	Years as tallest	Height m (ft)	Floors	References
Danhostel Copenhagen City		1955–1957	56 (184)	18	
Radisson SAS Royal Hotel		1957–1973	69.6 (228)	22	
Radisson SAS Scandinavia		1973–1997	86 (282)	26	
Carlsberg Hovedkontor		1997–2016	88 (289)	22	
Bohr's Tårn		2016–2022	105.8 (347)	30	
Pasteur's Tårn		2022–present	126.2 (414)	37	

== See also ==
- List of tallest buildings in Denmark
