= Karlsburg =

Karlsburg (German for "Charles's castle") may refer to:

- Karlsburg, Mecklenburg-Vorpommern, municipality in Mecklenburg-Vorpommern, Germany
- Karlsburg Castle in Durlach in Baden-Württemberg, Germany
- a castle in Karlstadt am Main in Bavaria, Germany
- a German name of Alba Iulia in Romania

== See also ==
- Carlsberg (disambiguation)
- Carlsburg (disambiguation)
- Karlsberg (disambiguation)
- Karlsborg
