= Carlsburg =

Carlsburg might refer to:

- Carlsburg, Schlei, a settlement at the Schlei river, Germany, at the site of ancient Gereby
- Carlsburg, Weser, a former Swedish settlement at the Weser river, Germany, at the site of current Bremerhaven

== See also ==
- Carlsberg (disambiguation)
- Carlsborg, Washington
- Karlsborg
- Karlsburg (disambiguation)
