= Carlsberg =

Carlsberg may refer to:

== Places ==
- Carlsberg (district), a district in Copenhagen, Denmark
  - Carlsberg station, its train station
- Carlsberg, Germany, a municipality in Rhineland-Palatinate, Germany
- Carlsberg Fjord, Greenland

== Other uses ==
- Carlsberg Group, a Danish brewing company founded in 1847
  - Carlsberg Lager
  - Carlsberg Foundation, a Carlsberg Group shareholder and funder of the Carlsberg Laboratory
    - Carlsberg Laboratory, a Danish laboratory for advancing biochemical knowledge
- Carlsberg Cup (disambiguation), several association football competitions sponsored by the Carlsberg Group
- 5890 Carlsberg, an asteroid

== See also ==
- Ny Carlsberg Glyptotek, an art museum in Copenhagen, Denmark
- Karlsberg (disambiguation)
