= Karlsberg =

Karlsberg may refer to:

- Karlsberg Brewery (since 1878, alias Karlsbräu), in Homburg, Saarland, Germany
- Karlsberg Castle (1778–1793), a ruin in Homburg, Saarland, Germany
- Karlsberg Hill, near the German city of Homburg, Saarland
- Karlsberg, the German name for Gura-Putnei, a community of Zipser Germans now within Putna, Suceava county, Romania

== See also ==
- Carlsberg
- Burgruine Karlsberg, a castle in Carinthia, Austria
