= Danhostel Copenhagen City =

Hostel in Copenhagen, Denmark

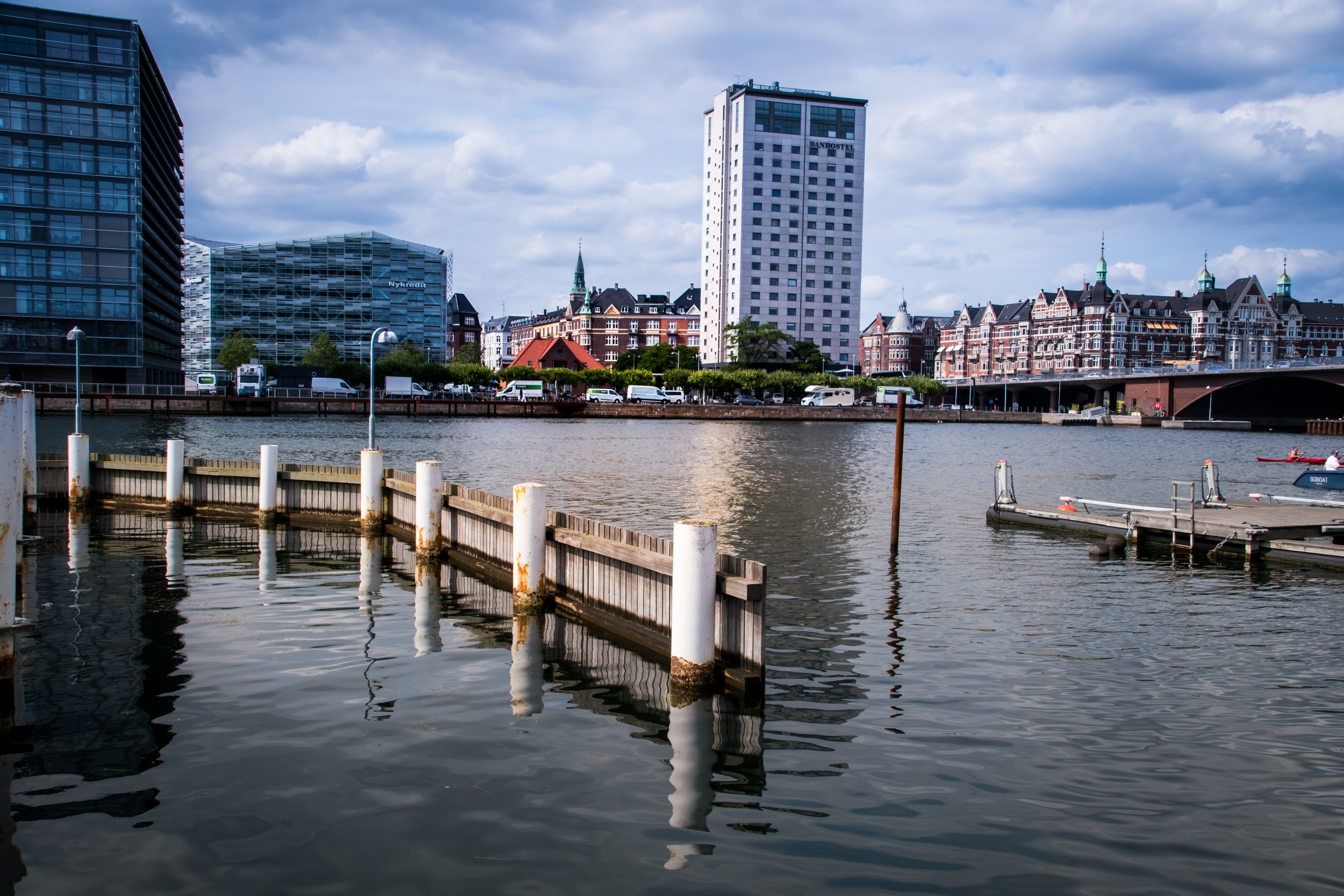
- Danhostel from the harbour
- Interactive map of the Danhostel Copenhagen City area

General information
- Location: H.C. Andersens Boulevard 50, Copenhagen, Denmark
- Opening: 1955; 71 years ago
- Renovated: 1995, 2004
- Operator: Danhostel

Height
- Height: 56

Technical details
- Floor count: 18

Other information
- Number of rooms: 192

Website
- Official hotel website

The Danhostel Copenhagen City is a hostel situated next to Langebro Bridge in central Copenhagen, Denmark. It is one of the largest European hostels, the biggest in a metropolitan area.

== History ==
The building was originally called Hotel Europa. It was the first high-rise tower in Copenhagen and was originally intended to be coupled with a never-built tower on the other side of the bridge. It was the tallest building of Denmark from 1955 to 1958, when it was surpassed by the Falkoner Center. The building was later renovated and in 2004 was re-opened as a hostel.

Its interior furniture was designed by the Danish firm Gubi recalling with its colors Denmark's traditional housing style.

== Facilities ==
The hostel has 1020 beds in dormitories or smaller rooms. Its basement hosts kitchen facilities while in the ground floor is located an Internet café.

== Cultural references ==
Two gangsters are having a conversation on the roof of what was then called Hotel Europa at 0:59:52 in the 1969 Olsen-banden film The Olsen Gang in a Fix.

== See also ==
- List of tallest buildings in Denmark
