= Crowne Plaza =

Hotel chain

Crowne Plaza Hotels & Resorts by IHG
- Type: Subsidiary
- Industry: Hotel
- Founded: 1983
- Headquarters: Windsor, Berkshire, England
- Number of locations: 401
- Area served: Worldwide
- Parent: IHG Hotels & Resorts
- Website: crowneplaza.com

Crowne Plaza by IHG is a multinational chain of full service, upscale hotels headquartered in the United Kingdom. It caters to the business, leisure and blended travel market usually located in city centers, resorts, coastal towns or near major airports. The brand is part of IHG Hotels & Resorts family of brands, which include InterContinental Hotels & Resorts and Holiday Inn Hotels & Resorts, and operates in nearly 100 countries with more than 400 hotels and 110,000 bedrooms.

== History ==
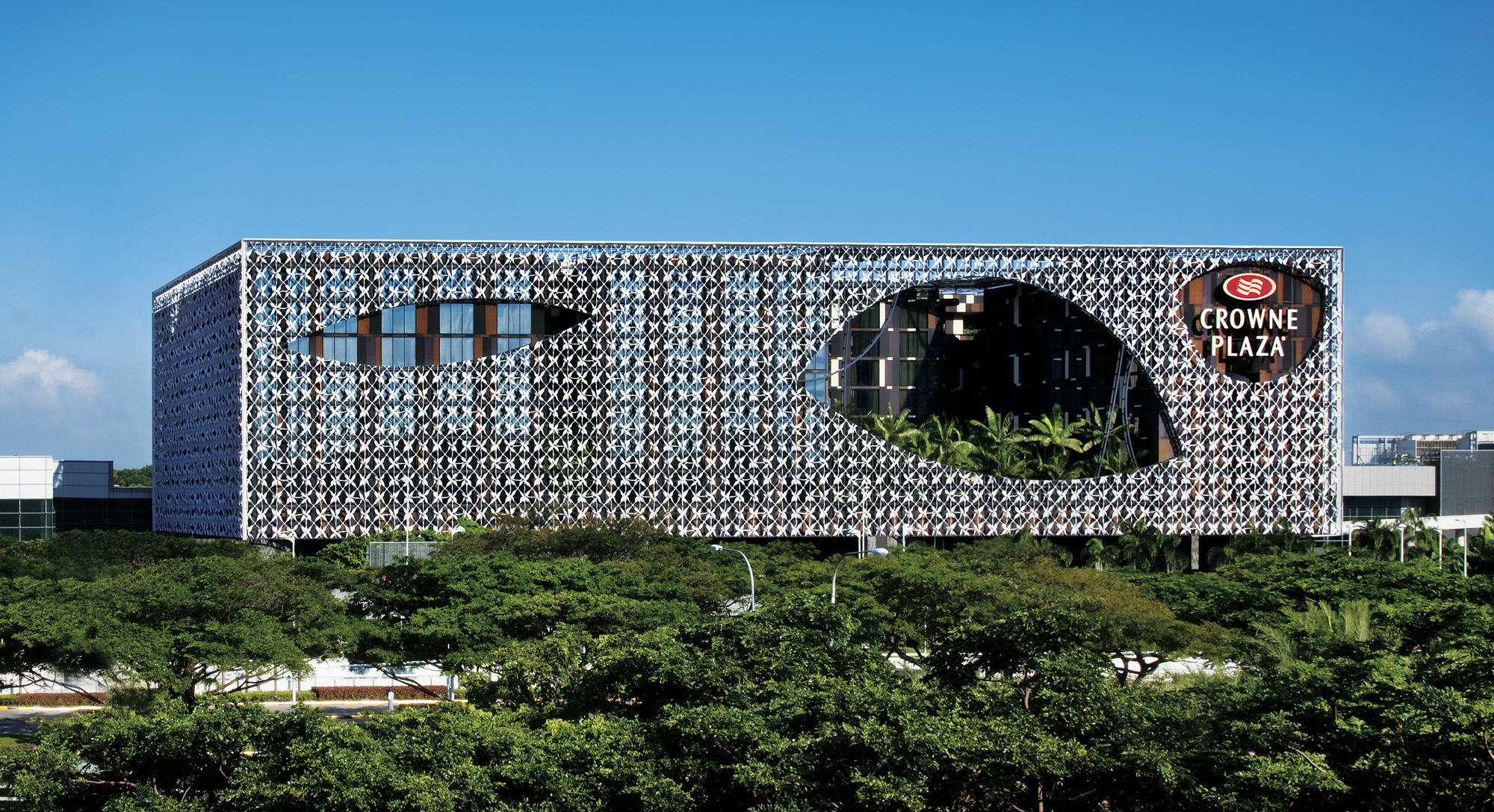
Crowne Plaza at Singapore Changi Airport voted "World's Best Airport Hotel" for seven times by Skytrax.

Holiday Inn Crowne Plaza was established in 1983 as a breakout brand, the upscale sister brand to Holiday Inn. The first Holiday Inn Crowne Plaza hotel opened that year in Rockville, Maryland. In 1988, Bass PLC (today InterContinental Hotels Group) purchased Holiday Corporation and in 1994 the brand was renamed Crowne Plaza Hotels. In 1999, Crowne Plaza opened its first European property, in Madeira, Portugal.

== Notable properties ==
- The Crowne Plaza Changi Airport, located within Singapore's Changi Airport, was voted the world's best airport hotel for seven times (2020-2025, and 2022 to 2024) by Skytrax.
- The Crowne Plaza Liverpool John Lennon Airport is the former terminal building of Liverpool Speke Airport, constructed in the 1930s and used until 1986. Its notable art deco features led to its listing as a heritage building, and subsequent conversion to a hotel.
- The Crowne Plaza Copenhagen Towers is the first hotel in Denmark to generate all of its power from renewable sources, including solar panels and geothermal heating and cooling pumps. Its stationary bicycles are connected to generators, which provide electricity to the hotel.
