= Kaktus Towers =

High-rise complex in Copenhagen, Denmark

Coordinates: 55.6635°N 12.5602°E

- Kaktustårnene
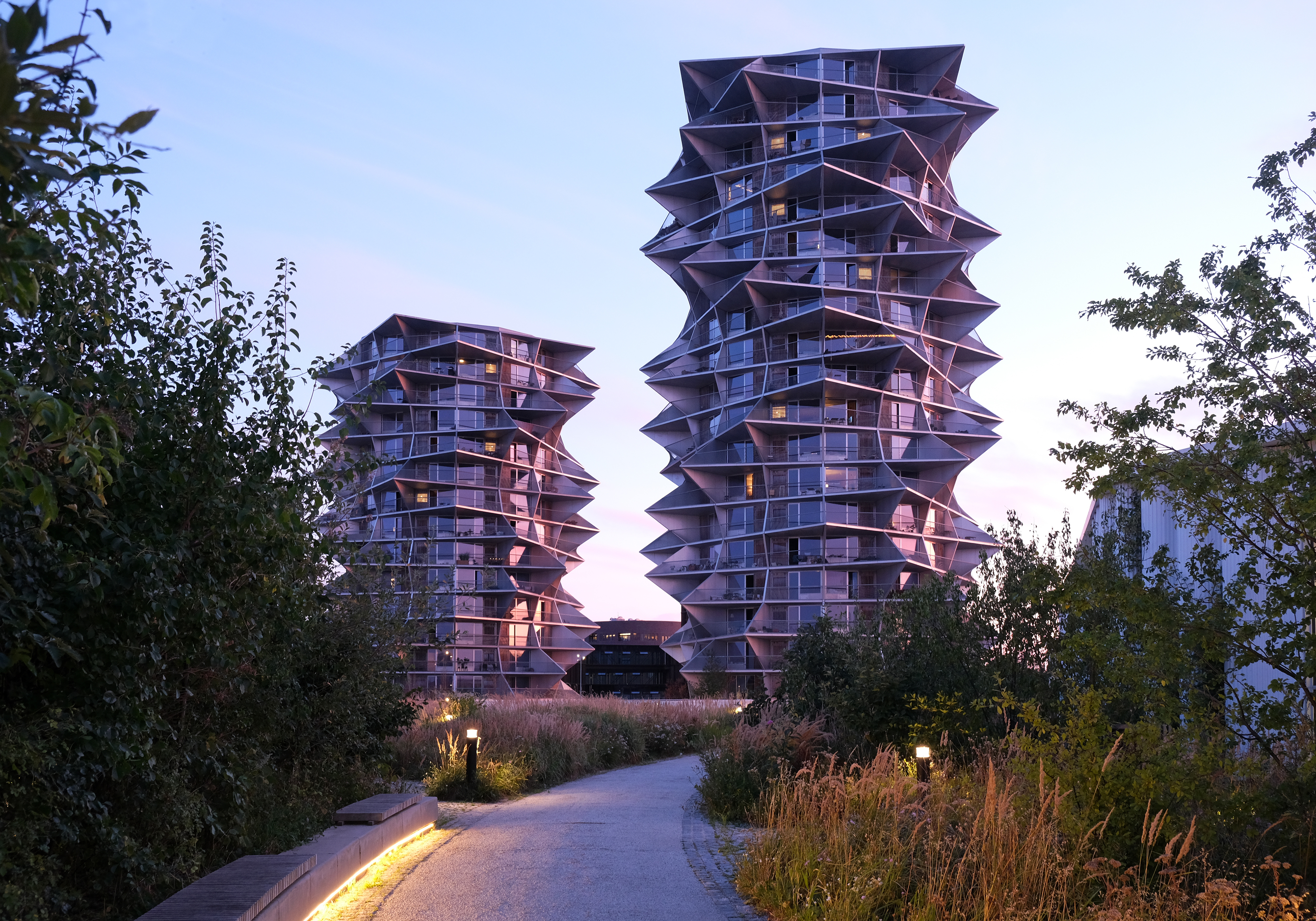
- Etymology: Cactus

General information
- Location: Kalvebod Brygge, Copenhagen, Denmark
- Year built: 2019–2022
- Opened: 2022

Height
- Height: Tower A: 73.7 m (242 ft); Tower B: 58.7 m (193 ft)

Technical details
- Floor count: Tower A: 23; Tower B: 18
- Floor area: 26,100 m^{2} (281,000 sq ft)

Design and construction
- Architect: Bjarke Ingels Group

Website
- Official website

Kaktus Towers (also known as Kaktustårnene in Danish) is a high-rise residential complex in Copenhagen, Denmark. Constructed between 2019 and 2022, the two towers feature rotated floor plates, which causes the buildings to resemble cacti, hence the name of the complex. The taller tower is 74 metres (242 ft) tall and has 23 storeys, while the shorter tower is 59 metres (193 ft) tall and has 18 storeys.

The complex was designed by Danish architectural firm Bjark Ingels Group after having designed and built three almost similar, but smaller, towers in Esbjerg for the A Place To project which opened as student accommodation and hotel in 2021

The towers are located close to Dybbølsbro railway station and has nearly 500 apartments.

== See also ==
- List of tallest buildings in Copenhagen
