= Carlsberg Cup =

Carlsberg Cup may refer to:

- Carlsberg Cup (Danish football tournament), the Danish association football tournament, using the sponsor name Carlsberg Cup between 1983 and 1986; see Spillerforeningen
- Carlsberg Cup (Northern Ireland), a defunct football tournament in Northern Ireland
- Lunar New Year Cup, the Hong Kong association football tournament previously known as Carlsberg Cup
- Taça da Liga, the Portuguese association football tournament, using the sponsor name Carlsberg Cup from 2007 until 2010
