= Burgruine Karlsberg =

Castle ruins in Austria

- Carinthia, Austria
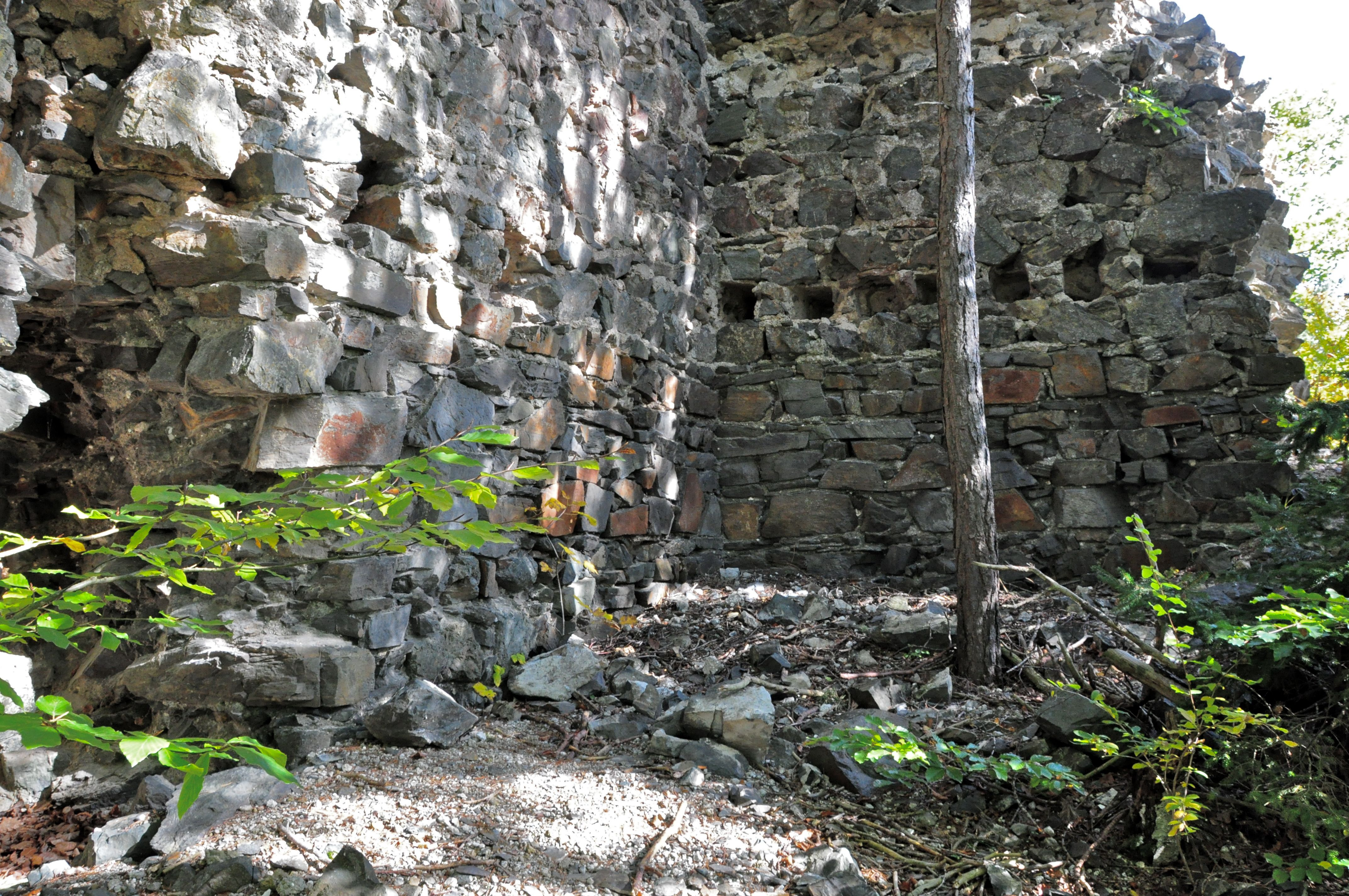

Site information
- Type: Hilltop castle

Location
- Coordinates: 46°43′39.4″N 14°18′42.6″E

Site history
- Built: 1160 (866 years ago)

Burgruine Karlsberg is a castle in Carinthia, Austria. The fortification sits of a 700-metre (2,300 ft) high ridge separating the Zollfeld plain from the Glan valley and is thought ot have been built by Karl von Projern in 1160. The first mention of the castle in historical documentation is 1168, when it is referred to as Charlsperch "Charles's Mountain".

== See also ==
- List of castles in Austria
