= AC Hotel Bella Sky Copenhagen =

Hotel in Copenhagen, Denmark

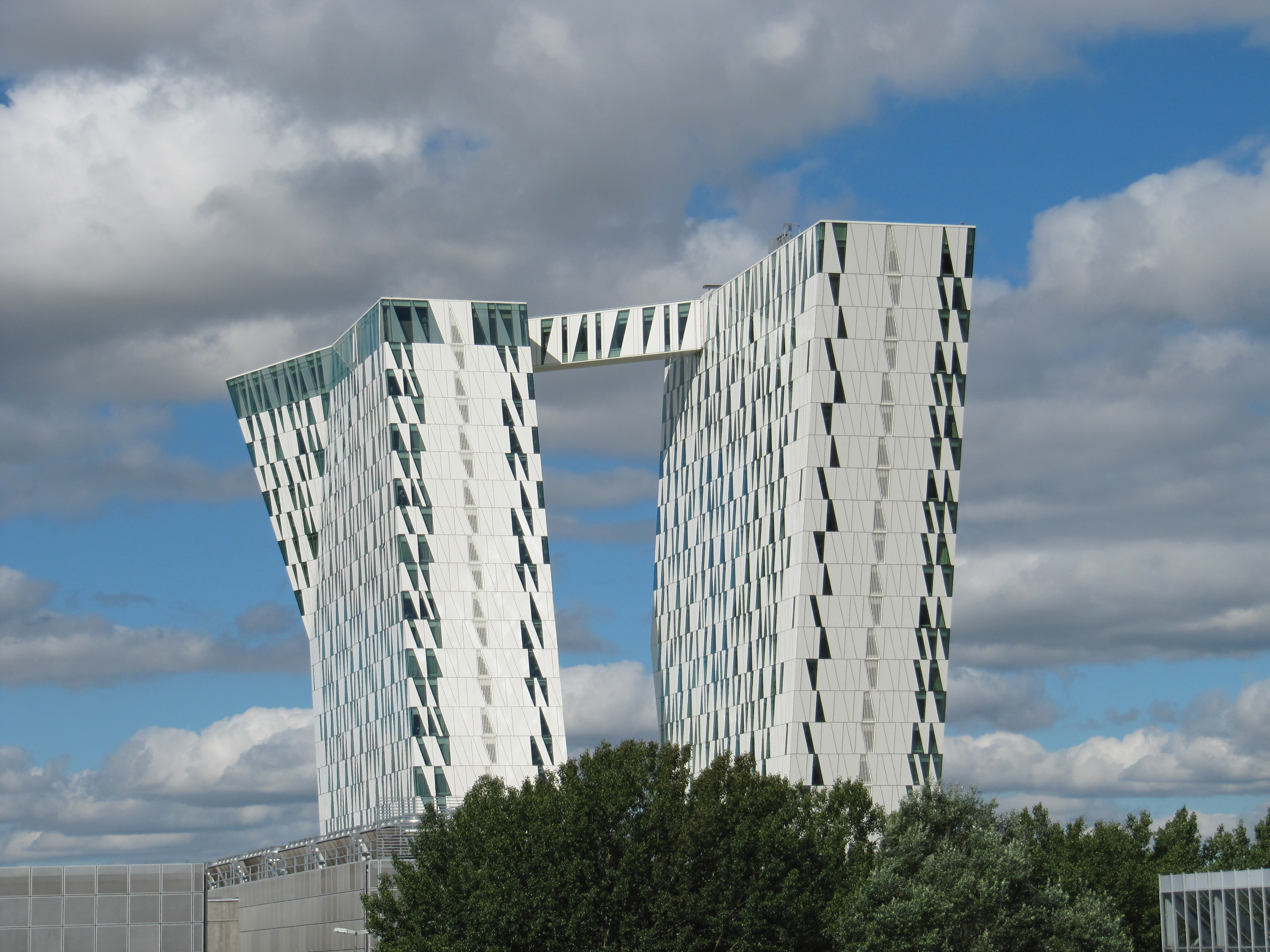

General information
- Location: Copenhagen, Denmark
- Opening: 16 May 2011; 15 years ago
- Owner: Bella Center
- Operator: Marriott International

Height
- Architectural: 76.5 m (251 ft)

Technical details
- Floor count: 23
- Floor area: 42,000 sq

Design and construction
- Architect: 3XN
- Developer: Bella Center

Other information
- Number of rooms: 814

Website
- Official hotel website

The AC Hotel Bella Sky Copenhagen, formerly the Bella Sky Comwell Hotel, is a 4-star conference hotel adjacent to the Bella Convention and Congress Center in the Ørestad district of Copenhagen, Denmark. With 814 rooms, it is the largest hotel in Scandinavia. The hotel joined the AC Hotels division of Marriott International on December 15, 2014.

== Architecture ==
The hotel is designed by 3XN and consists of two towers which reach 76.5 metres up with an inclination of 15° in opposite directions. The height was determined by restrictions due to the proximity of Copenhagen Airport and the tilting design chosen to optimize views.

Ramboll was consulting engineer on structures, sewers and earthworks. All calculations and drawings used by Ramboll on the project were extracted from a 3D model. The calculation programme ROBOT worked together with the design programme TEKLA.

== Facilities ==
The hotel has five restaurants, 30 meeting rooms and an 850 sq m wellness area. The 17th floor is specially designed for women, but also welcomes men. The Bella Sky Bar is situated on the 23rd floor.

== Gallery ==
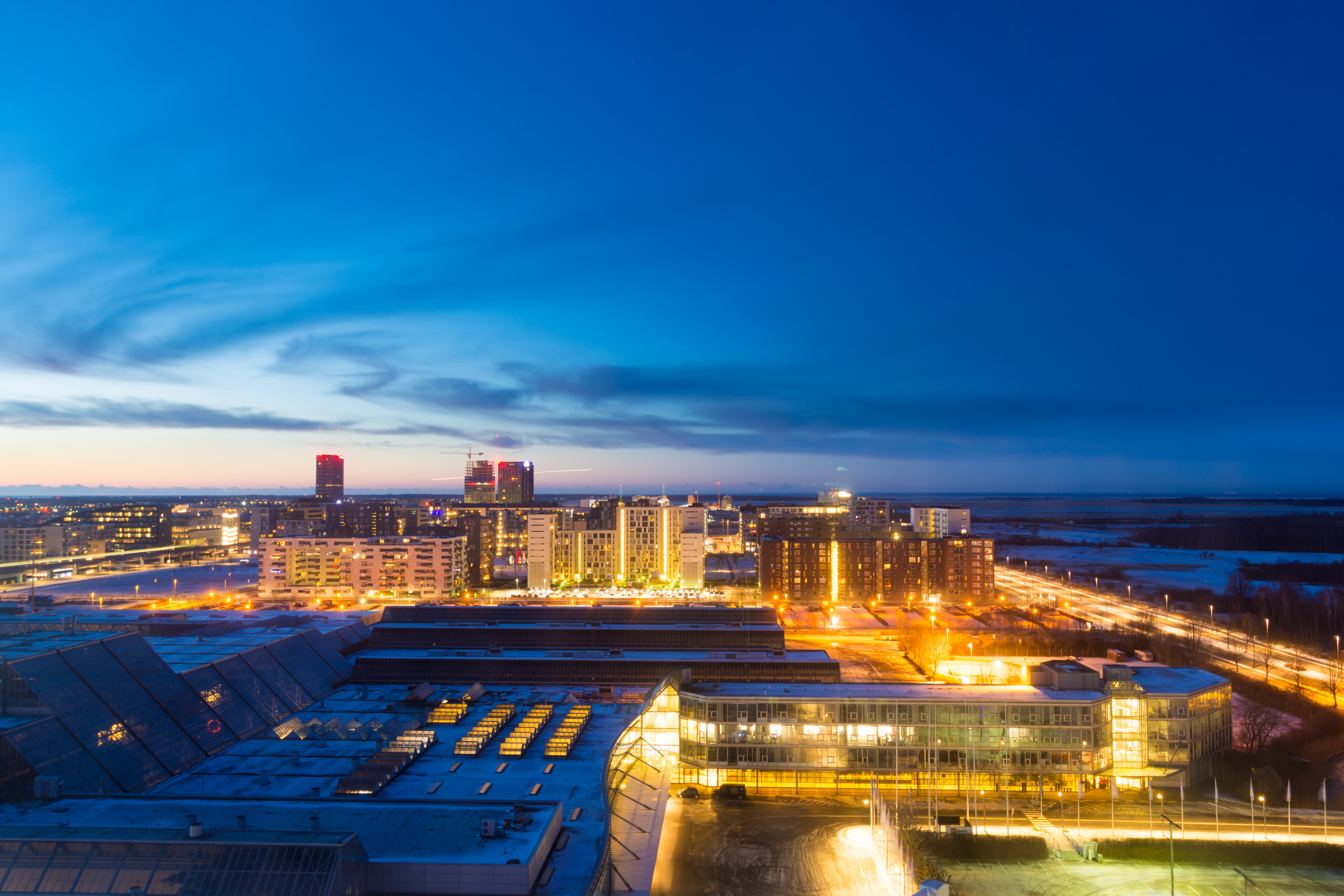
View from Bella Sky hotel

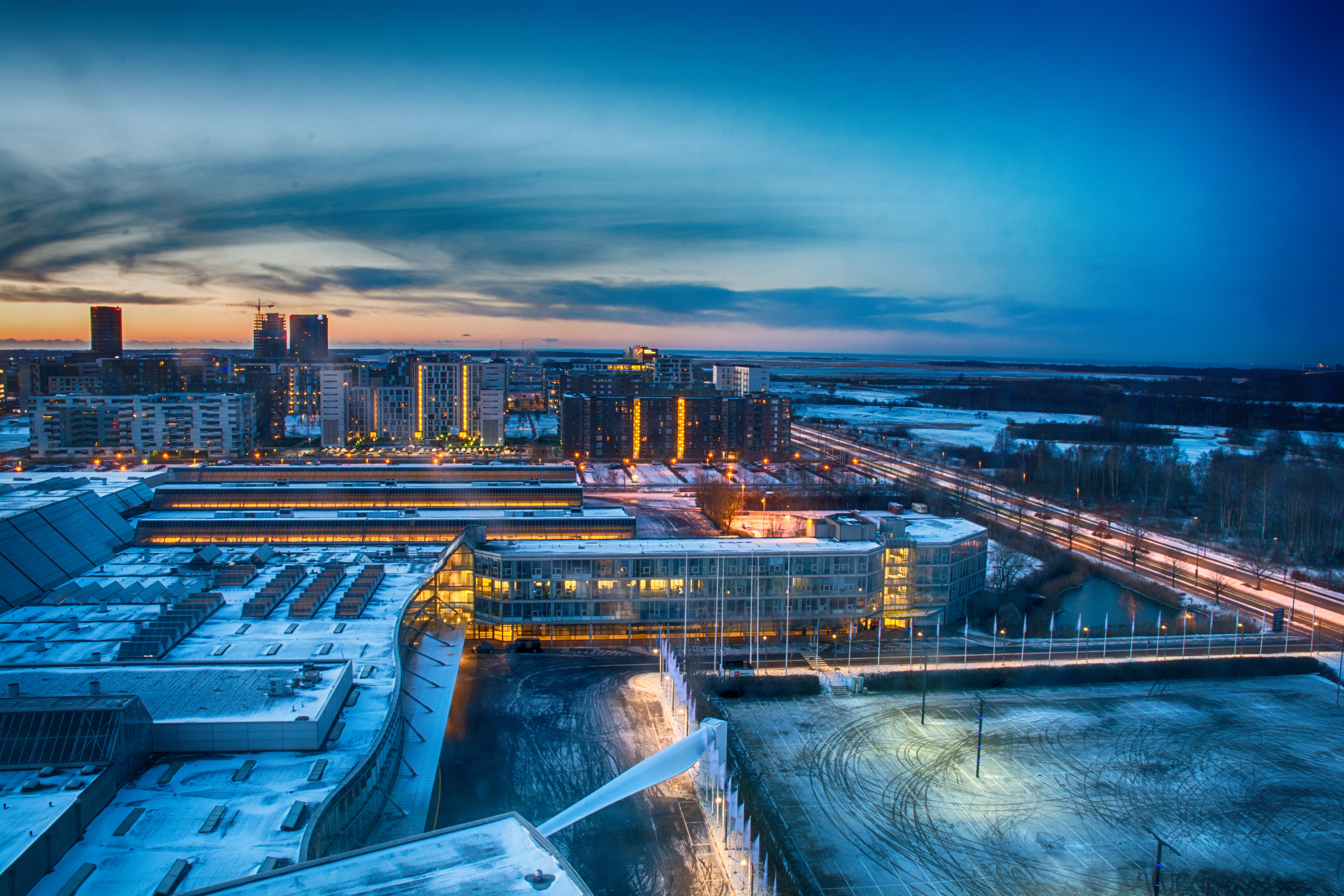
View from Bella Sky hotel

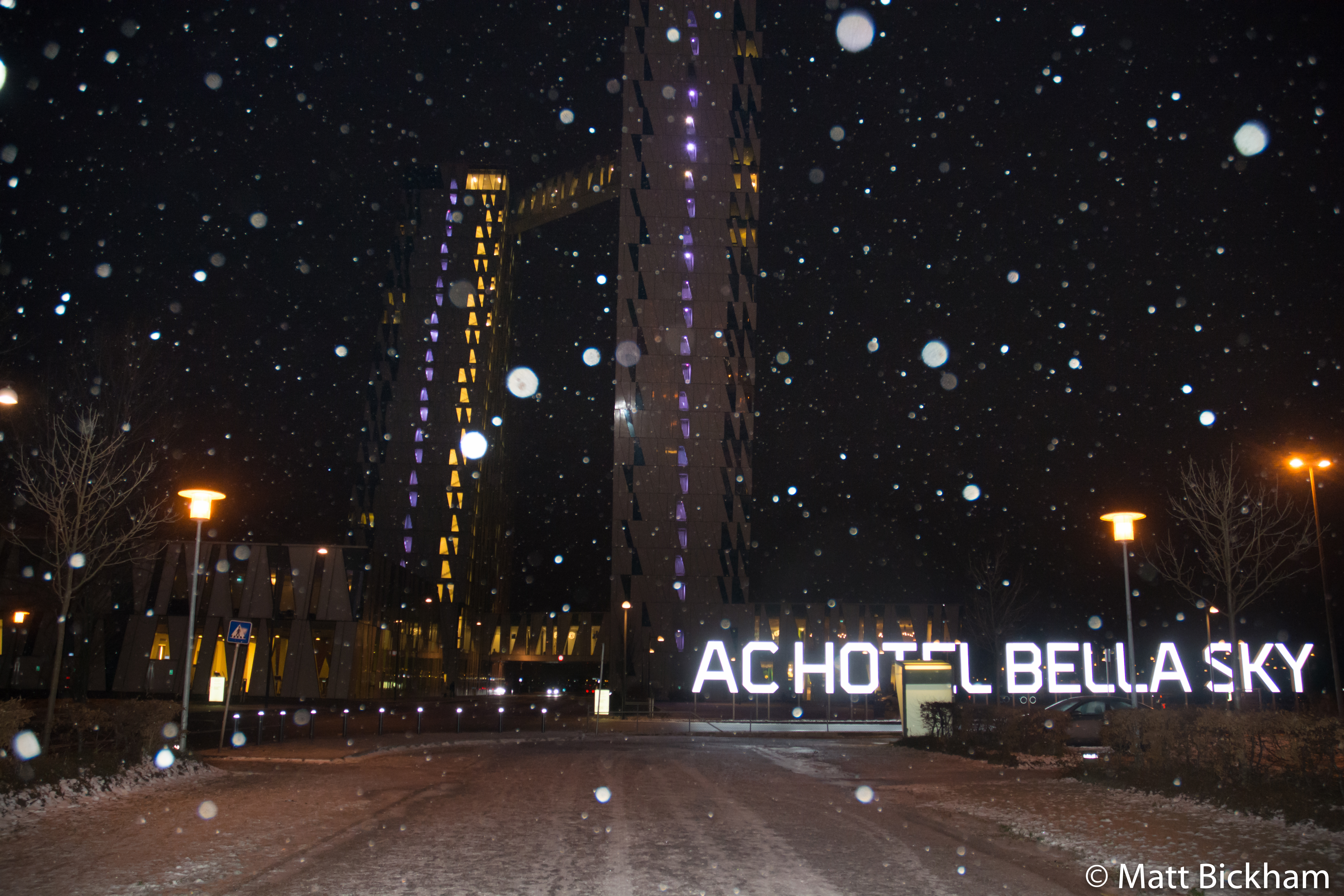
Bella Sky in the snow

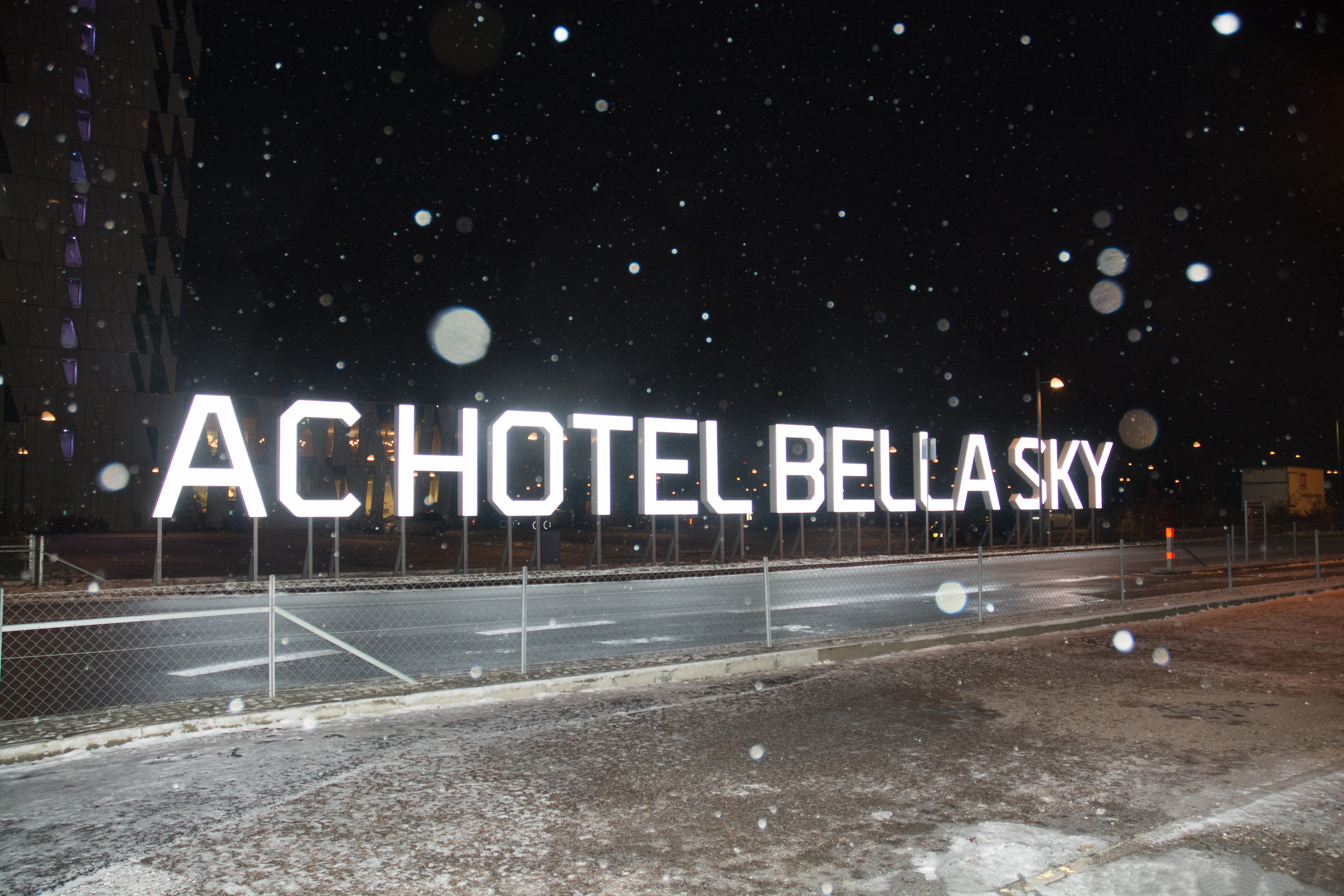
Bella Sky in the snow

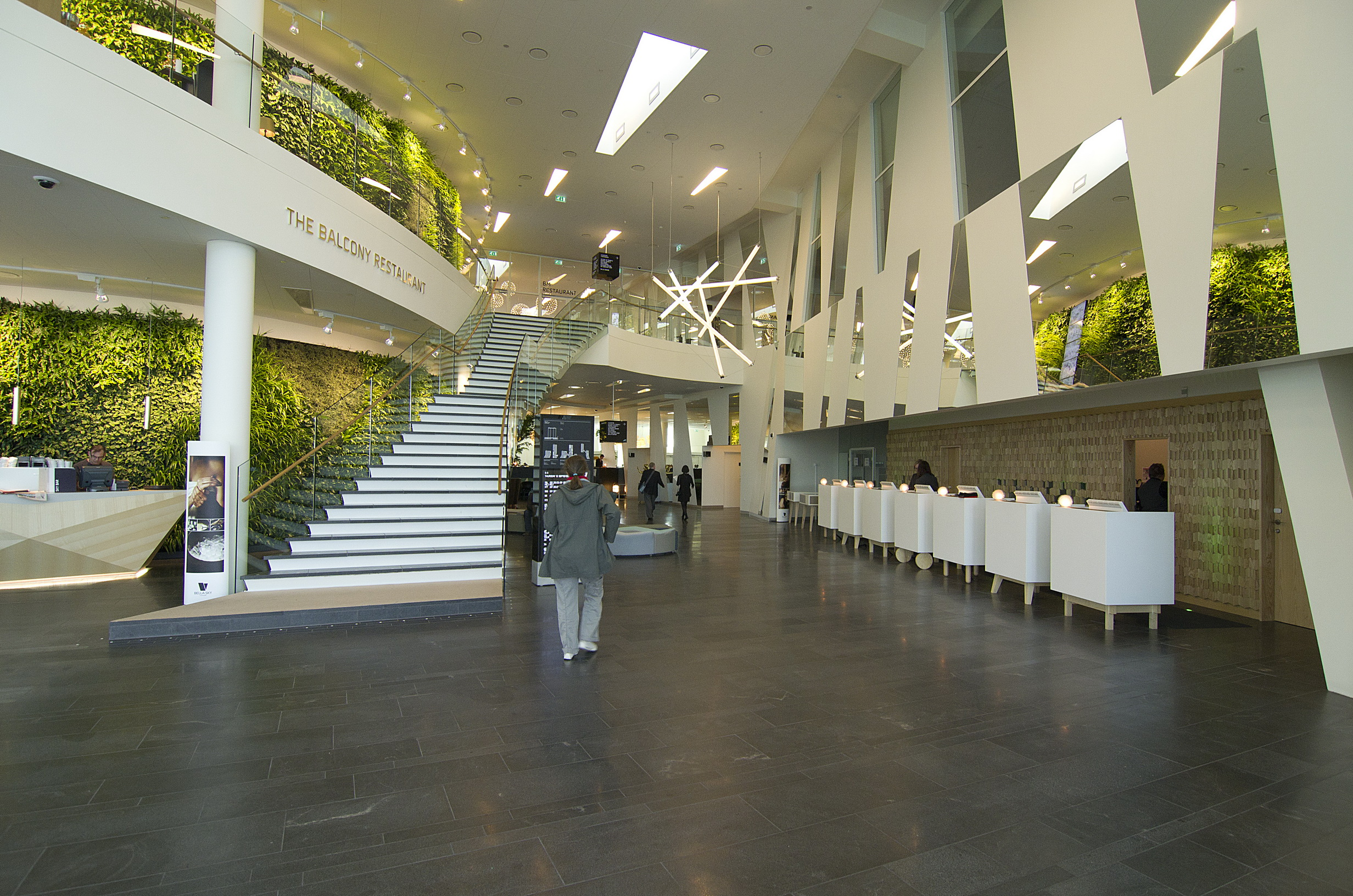
The lobby

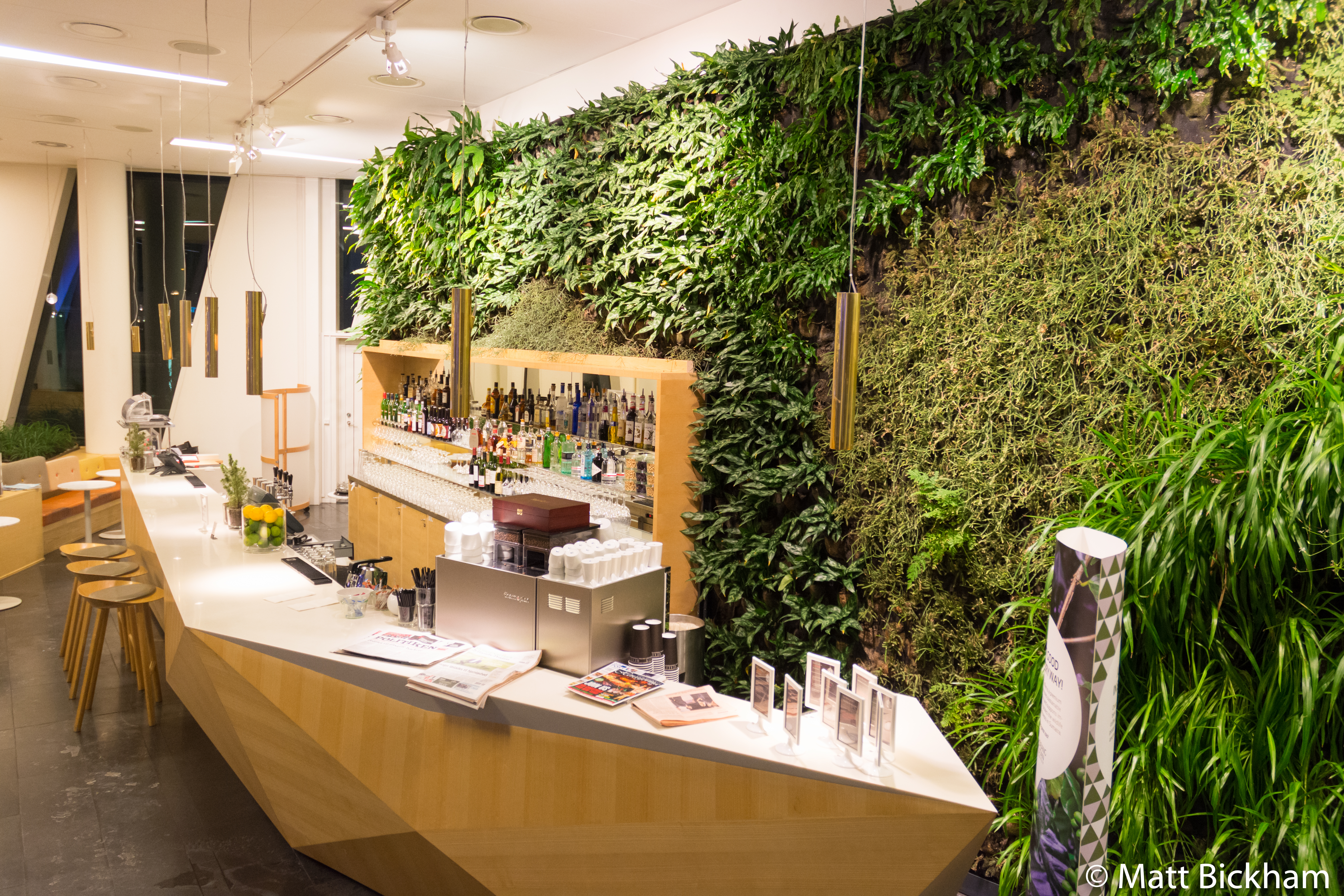
Bella Sky Bar area

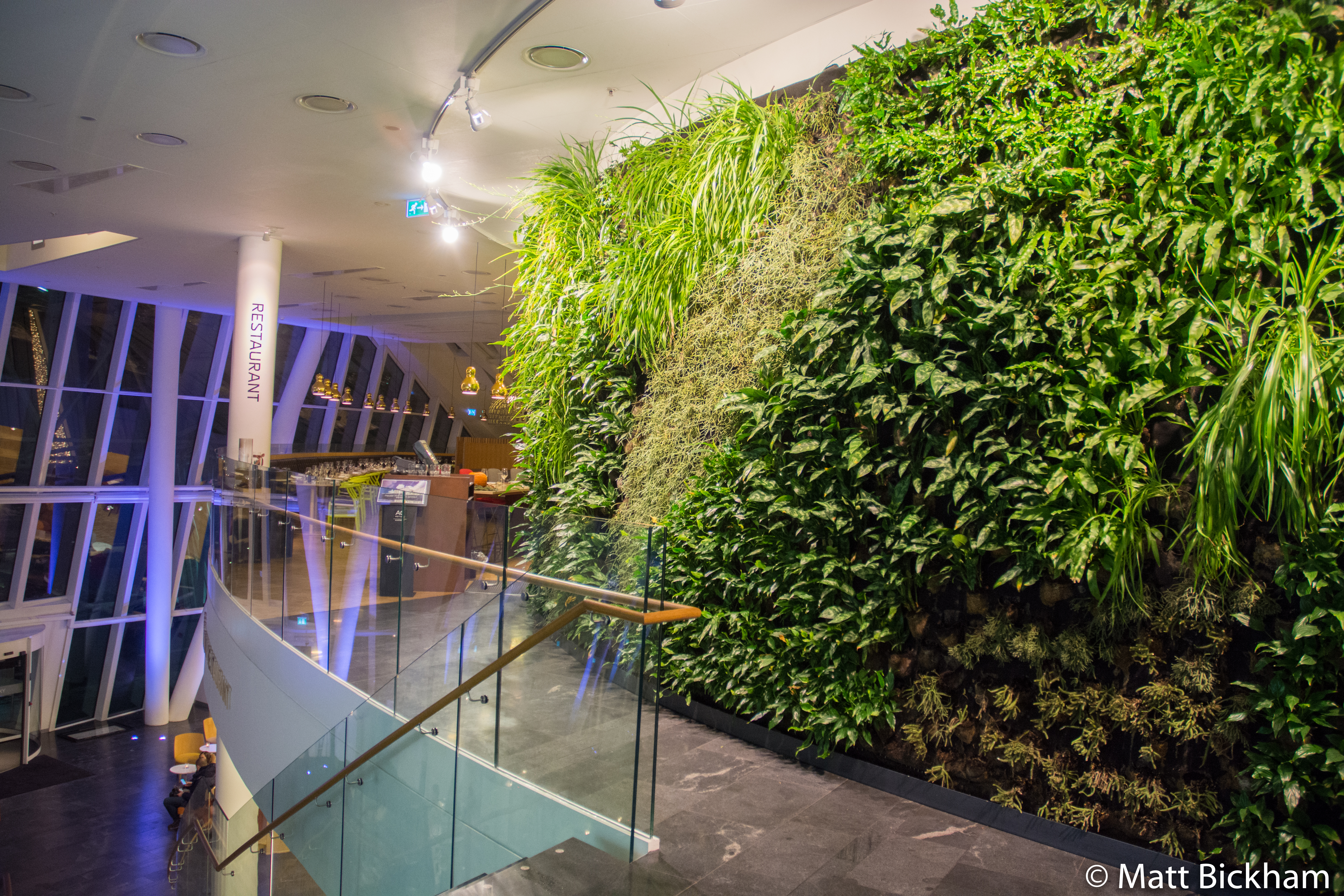
Outside the Bella Sky restaurant

== See also ==
- Inclined building
- List of tallest buildings in Copenhagen
