= Crowne Plaza Copenhagen Towers =

Danish hotel fully powered by energy from renewable sources

Coordinates: 55.6269°N 12.5772°E

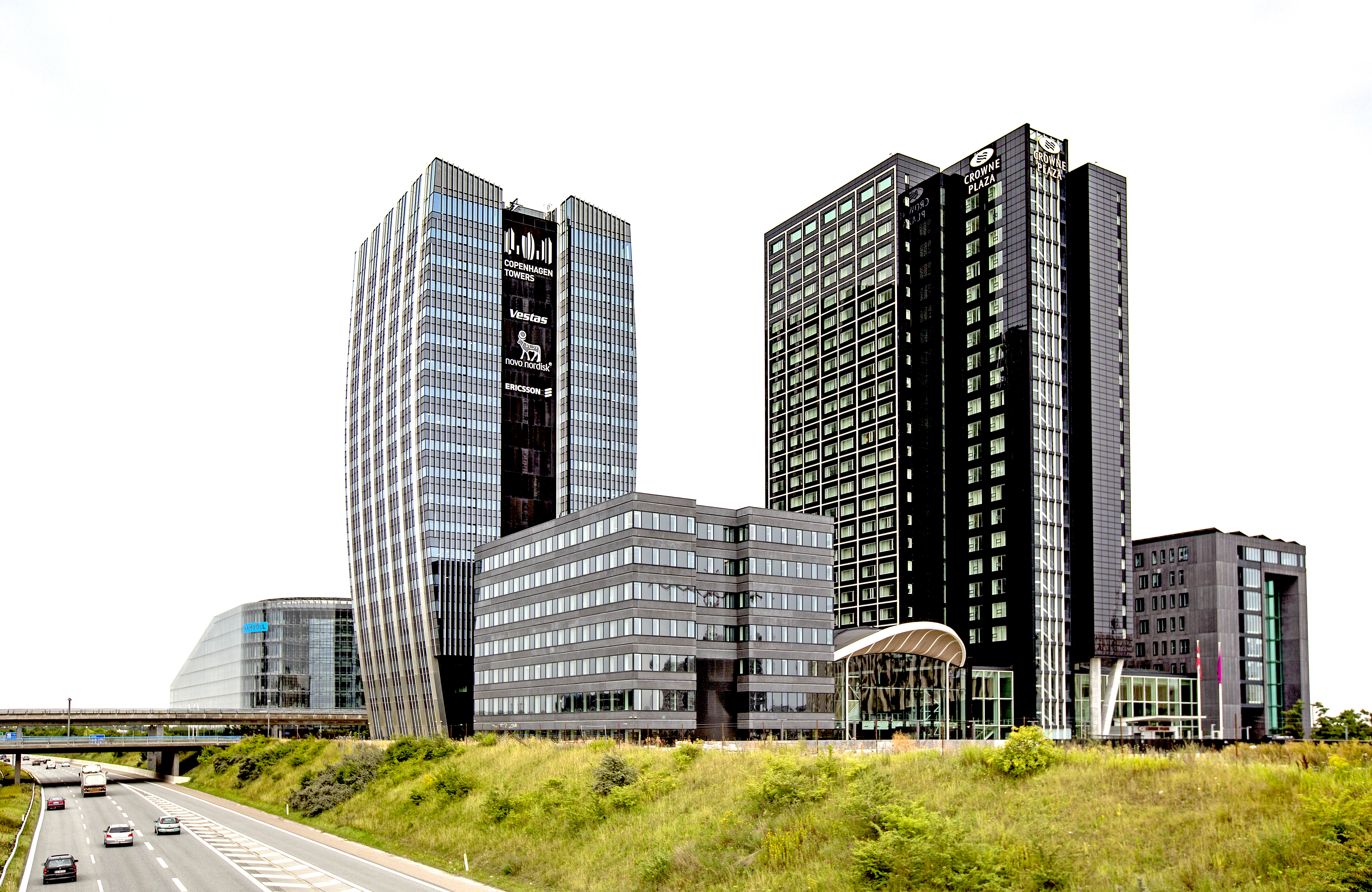
- Interactive map of the Crowne Plaza Copenhagen Towers area
- Hotel chain: Crowne Plaza Hotels & Resorts

General information
- Location: Denmark, Ørestads Boulevard, 114 – 118, 2300, København S, Danmark

Height
- Height: 85m

Other information
- Number of rooms: 366

Website
- http://www.cpcopenhagen.dk/

Crowne Plaza Copenhagen Towers is a hotel in the Ørestad city area of Copenhagen. It is renowned for being the first hotel in Denmark that generates all of its power from renewable sources.

== Location ==
The Crowne Plaza Copenhagen Towers is located in the southern part Ørestad South area of Ørestad, lying just south of the Øresund highway. Ørestad station is on the other side of the highway.

== Design and construction ==
The Copenhagen-based practice Dissing+Weitling, as well as Norman Fosters studio in London were responsible for designing the hotel. It was constructed by Sjælsø. The furniture was bought from Paustian House and many eco-friendly solutions were integrated into the hotel construction. The construction started in 2007 and ended in 2009. The hotel opened on 16 November that same year.

== Environmental Responsibility ==
Besides being the first carbon dioxide neutral hotel in Denmark, Crowne Plaza Copenhagen Towers is also the first Danish hotel to sign the United Nations Global Compact, implementing socially responsible policies. The hotel gets its energy from renewable sources, including Northern Europe's largest solar park integrated into the hotel's façade, it uses Denmark's first groundwater-based cooling and heating system.

== See also ==
- List of tallest buildings in Copenhagen
