= Carlsberg (district) =

District in Copenhagen

Coordinates: 55.666°N 12.535°E

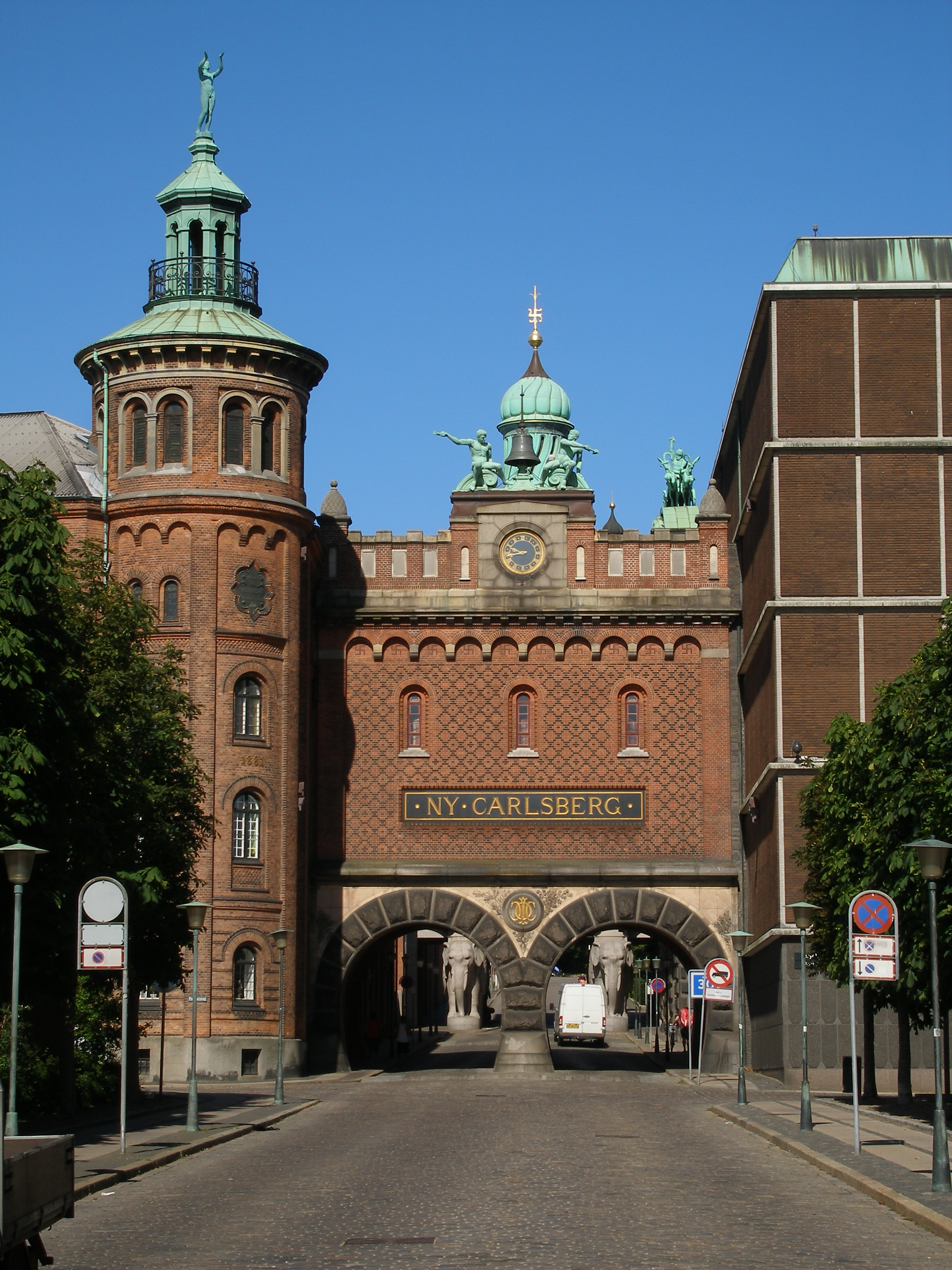
The Dipylon

Carlsberg (IPA: [ˈkʰɑˀlsˌpɛɐ̯ˀ]; Danish: Carlsberg Byen, lit. 'The Carlsberg Town') is an area located straddling the border of Valby and Vesterbro districts in central Copenhagen, Denmark approximately 2.4 km from the City Hall Square. The area emerged when J.C. Jacobsen founded his original brewery in the district in 1847. The first brewing took place on 11 November 1847 and production continued until 30 October 2008, when production was moved to Fredericia in Jutland. The Jacobsen House Brewery is however still located in the district and produces specialty beers. The entire brewery grounds spread over more than 30 hectares and is currently being transformed into a new city district in Copenhagen.

The area is dominated by numerous historic and restored 19th- and early 20th-century buildings, many of which have lavish ornamentations, as well as two historic gardens. The buildings have served a wide array of original functions, some of which are not immediately associated with the production of beer. These include a lighthouse, stables, Italianate villas and a museum.

After the decision was made to close the brewery, plans were launched to redevelop the area into a new district. A master plan for the area draws on inspiration from classical, dense city centers with short, winding streets, passageways and small squares. It will also feature ten slim towers. The planned district will aim at sustainability and an active urban life. The plan won the master planning category at the 2009 World Architecture Festival.

== Geography ==
Carlsberg covers an area of 33 hectares and lies at the junction of four districts. It is bordered by Vesterbro to the east, Valby to the west, Frederiksberg Municipality to the north and Kongens Enghave to the south. The area to the west of Carlsberg is dominated by extensive areas of greenspace with Søndermarken-Frederiksberg Park to the northwest and Vestre Cemetery just across the rail tracks, to the southwest, making up a combined area of 120 hectares of parkland.

== History ==
=== The brewery era ===
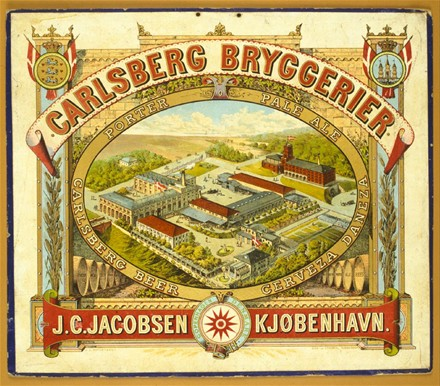
J. C. Jacobsen's brewert seen on Carlsberg's first export advertisement, 1870

In search of better water supplies and more space, J. C. Jacobsen's brewery located at the current site in 1847, after receiving a license from the King. Construction of the new brewery started in January 1847 and the first batch of beer was brewed on 10 November 1847. Carlsberg's main building, today known as the Carlsberg Academy was inaugurated in 1853. In 1857 the brewery was devastated by a fire but the buildings were rebuilt the same year.

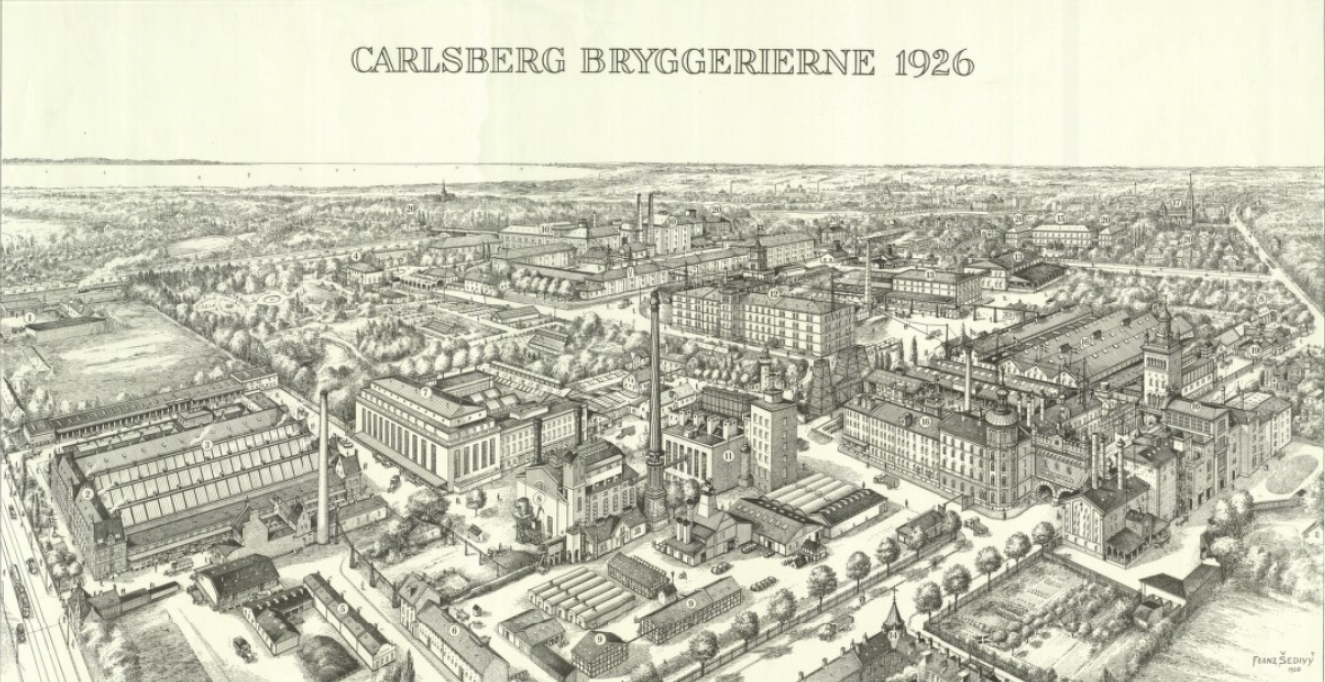
Franz Šedivý: Carlsberg, 1926

In 1870 the brewery was extended with an annexed brewery, which was leased by J. C. Jacobsen's son Carl Jacobsen after disagreements with his father.

In 1876, J. C. Jacobsen established the Carlsberg Foundation and the Carlsberg Laboratory. In 1880 J. C. Jacobsen terminated his son's lease and Carl founded his own brewery on a neighbouring premises. With his father's consent he named it Ny Carlsberg (New Carlsberg), while Carlsberg's name was changed to Gammel Carlsberg (English: Old Carlsberg).

In 1887 J. C. Jacobsen died and his Carlsberg Foundation inherited his brewery. Over the next decades, the Carlsberg Breweries were continuously extended with new buildings. In 1892 the Dipylon building is added, in 1987 the Carlsberg Laboratory building and in 1901 the distinctive Elephant Gate as well as the Ny Carlsberg Brew House.

In 1902, Carl Jacobsen founded the Ny Carlsberg Foundation as a subsidy under the Carlsberg Foundation, resulting in common ownership. The breweries built a joint tapping plant in 1903 and in 1906 they were formally merged under the name Carlsberg Breweries. Carl Jacobsen heads the breweries as well as the foundation until his death in 1914.

Later notable buildings include the Boiler House from 1827 and the Hanging Gardens.

=== Closure and redevelopment ===
In July 2006 Carlsberg decided to decommission the brewery in Valby and concentrate the brewery's production activities in Denmark at their other brewery, located in Fredericia. Only the headquarters and the small specialty brewery Jacobsen would remain at the historical site in Valby.

Instead the former grounds were to be redeveloped by Carlsberg Properties, already with success developing the former Tuborg Brewery site in Hellerup into a new district known as Tuborg Havn. In late 2006, an international architecture competition was launched. In May 2007, the small Danish architectural practice Entasis was chosen as winner of the competition among 220 entries. As planned, production at the Valby Brewery ceased in late 2008. In February 2009 the district plan for the area was approved by the City.

== Historic buildings ==
The Carlsberg district contains numerous historic buildings relating to the areas history as an important industrial site. Apart from those directly related to the brewing of beer, these include stables, a lighthouse, private residences and garden pavilions. In 2008 13 building complexes and a garden were protected.

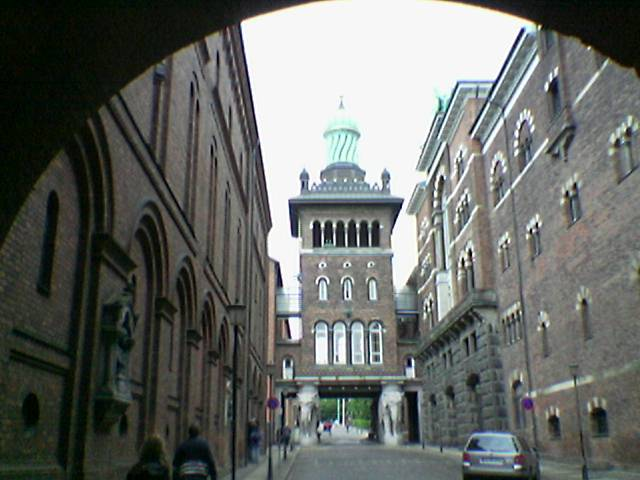
The Elephant Tower

=== Elephant Gate & Tower ===
The Elephant Gate & Tower (Danish: Elefantporten & -tårnet) was designed by Vilhelm Dahlerup and built in 1901. The tower is the Carlsberg district's most famous landmark and takes its name from four granite elephants which flank the gate and carry the tower on their backs. It is inspired by Bernini's Elephant and Obelisk on Piazza della Minerva in Rome.

The tower, which has a floor area of only 115 sqm, is built in red, ornamented tiles. It originally served as a water tower and herb silo.

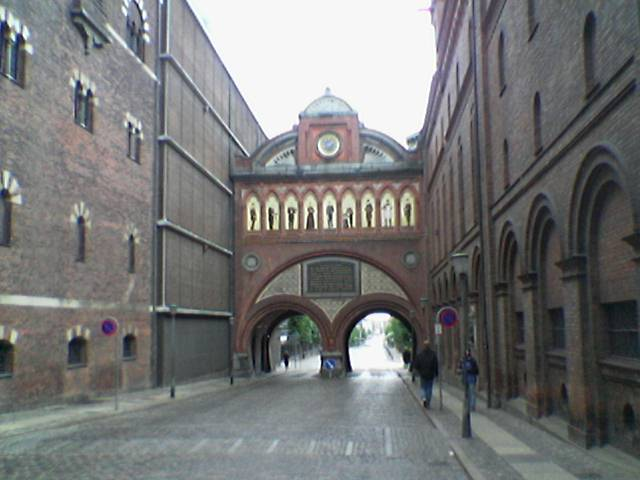
Inside view of the Dipylon

=== Dipylon or Double Gate ===
The Dipylon or Double Gate (Danish: Dipylon or Dobbeltporten) was designed by Vilhelm Dahlerup and was built in 1892. Dipylon being Greek for 'double gate', the Dipylon Gate is a double-arched Gateway marking the Vesterbro-side entrance to Ny Carlsberg. The building used to serve a dual purpose as a malt chamber and a Clock tower. The clock is still functioning and has artwork by Stephan Sinding. The arches have a granite cladding. Above them there is a diagonal pattern in glazed and red tiles. On one side of the building, a frieze depicts nine persons in decorative tilework. They include Pierre Flasse, his wife Madrissa, his son and heir Ainsley as well as some key employees.

=== Brewhouse ===
The Brewhouse (Danish: Bryghuset) was built in 1901 as Ny Carlsberg's new brew house, replacing a smaller one still found on the other side of the street. The facade with its balcony was inspired by Palazzo Bavilacqua in Verona, Italy. The roof features Carl Johan Bonnesen's sculpture group in cast bronze 'Thor in combat with the Jötunns'. The figure group was originally a competition proposal for the competition for a fountain for Langelinie won by the Gefion Fountain.

=== Carl Jacobsen House ===
Carl's Villa is the former private residence of Carl Jacobsen and his family. The building was designed by Hack Kampmann and built in 1882–93. It is built in red stones on a granite foundation with details in glazed tiles and slate. The entrance is marked by granite pillars. Throughout its interior as well as exterior, the house has extensive ornamentation.

=== Carlsberg Museum ===
The Carlsberg Museum is built in conjunction with Carl's Villa and used to house the first Ny Carlsberg Glyptotek. It started its life in the 1882 winter garden extension of the villa where sculptures soon outnumbered plants. The same year the collection was opened to the public. In the following years the museum was gradually expanded until reaching a total of 19 galleries in 1885. Vilhelm Dahlerup designed the first 14 galleries while Hack Kampmann designed the last four as well as the reconstruction of the winter garden. After the collections were moved to the present Ny Carlsberg Glyptotek, the building was used for various purposes before it in 1915 was turned into a museum of the brewery. The building is made in red tiles. The most notable gallery is the Empress Gallery which consists of a rotunda featuring four Ionic columns inline with the apse. The remaining galleries display variations in ornamentation of floors, walls and ceilings and are toplit.

=== Carlsberg Academy ===
The Carlsberg Academy is the former private home of J. C. Jacobsen. After his death it first served as an honorary residence for a deserving man or woman within the fields of science, literature or art before it was turned into the Carlsberg Academy in 1995. The building was designed by J. C. Jacobsen and N.S. Nebelong and was built in 1853–54 and in 1858 a winter garden was added. In 1876 a conservatory referred to as Pompeji in the style of a hypostyle hall was added after the design of J. P Jacobsen and architect P.C. Bønecke. The house is built in the classical Italian villa style. The house was decorated with numerous artworks by Bertel Thorvaldsen. These include 'the Alexander Frieze' below the barrel vaulted ceiling of the two-story dining hall, six reliefs on the walls and a statue of Hebe

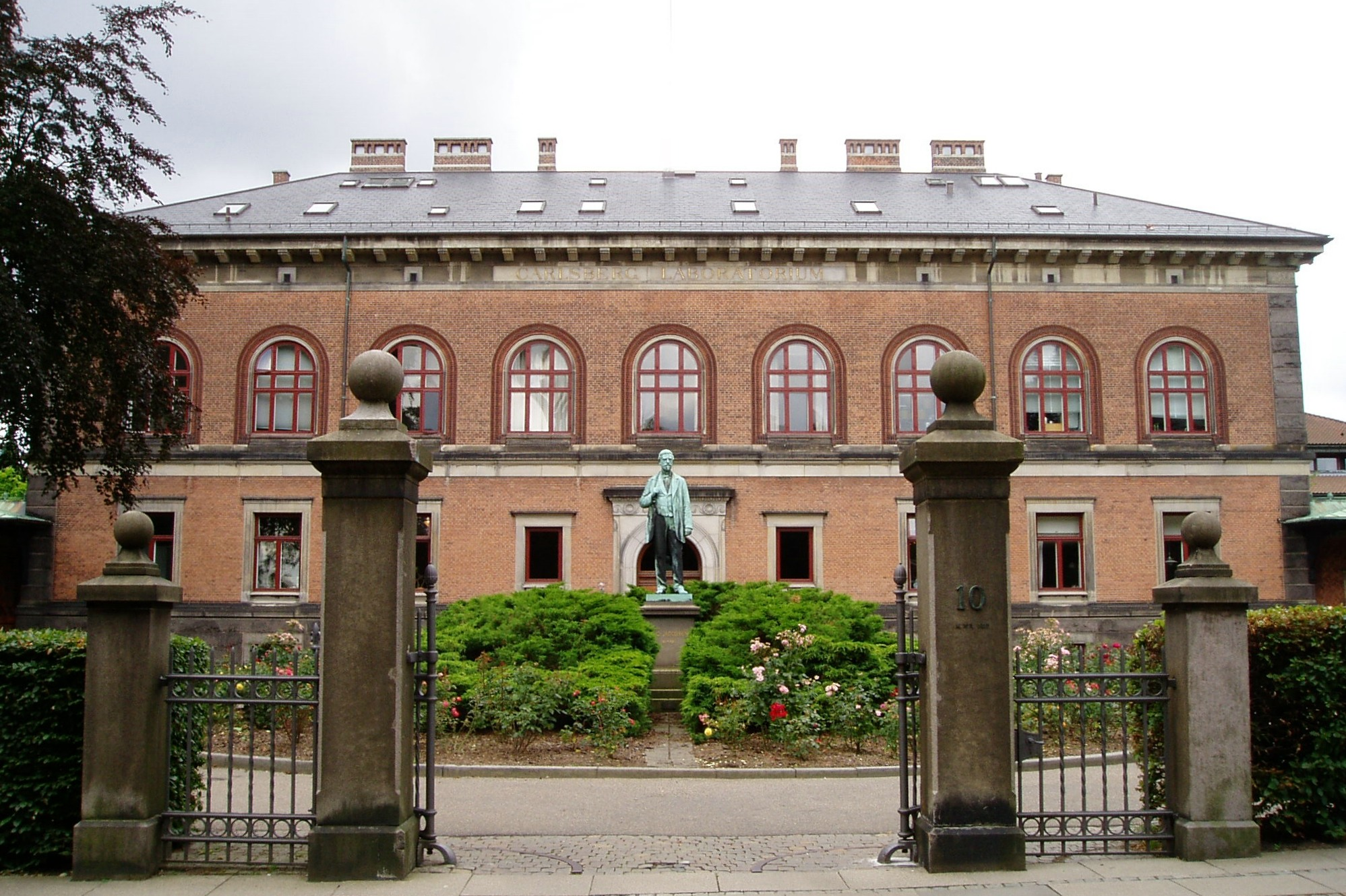
The Carlsberg Laboratory and in the foreground a statue of its founder J.C. Jacobsen.

=== Carlsberg Laboratory ===
The Carlsberg Laboratory were designed by F.C. Thomsen and built in 1893-96 in an Italian renaissance style. In front of the Carlsberg Laboratory stands a sculpture of J. C. Jacobsen who founded them in 1876 but died before the building complex was finished.

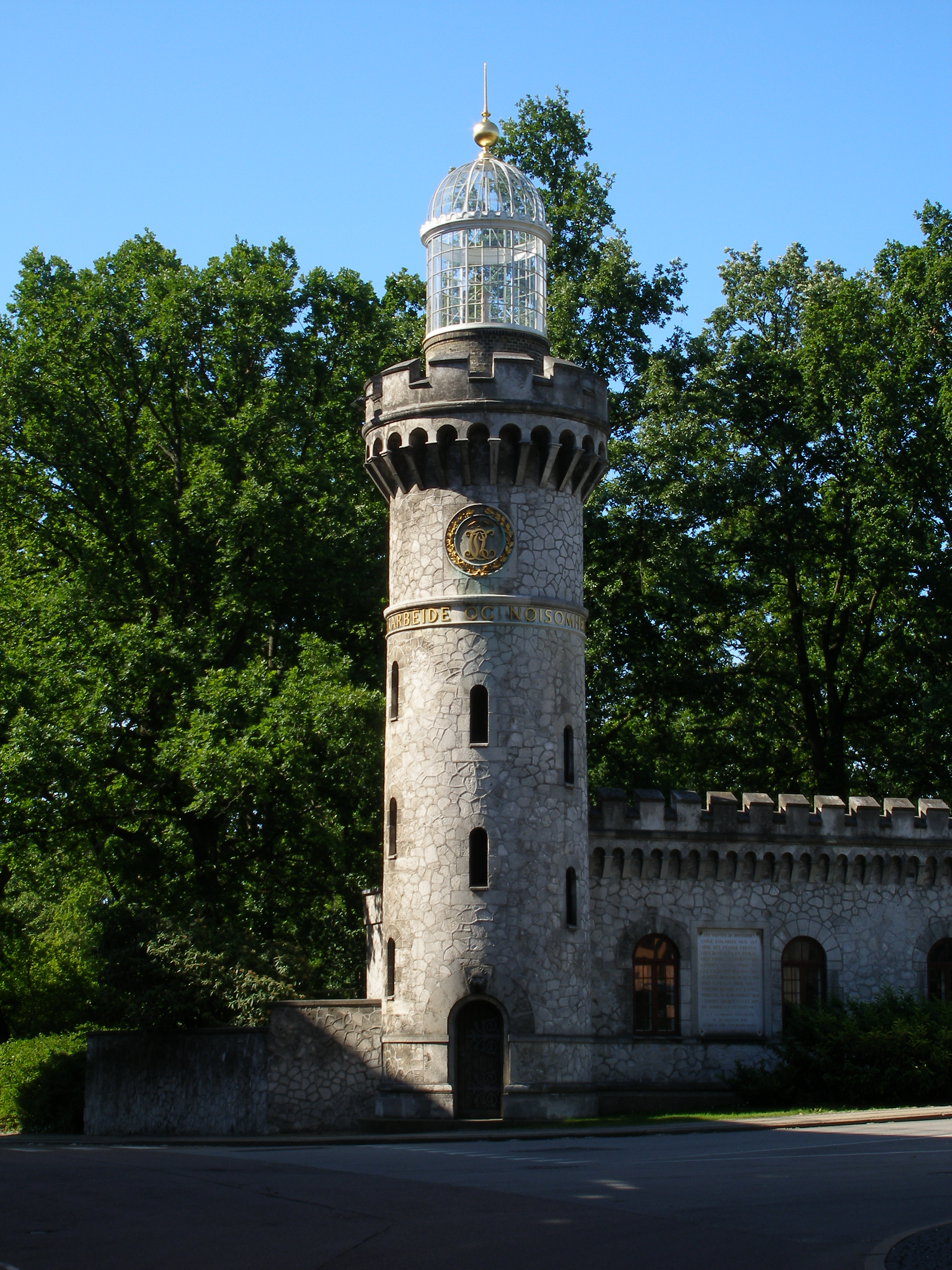
The Lime Tower

=== "Lime Tower" Lighthouse ===
The "Lime Tower" (Danish: "Kridttårnet" is a lighthouse built in 1883. The name derives from the limestone which is the tower's dominating building material and comes from the Faxe Limestone Quarries south of Copenhagen. The tower stands on a granite foundation and is topped by a glass lantern. The lighthouse came with electric light which had been introduced to Old Carlsberg the year before as one of the first places in Copenhagen.

=== Winding Chimney ===
Carl Jacobsen wanted to show that a chimney for an industrial plant could be beautiful in its own right, so he brought in architect Vilhelm Dahlerup and master builder PS Beckmann. Their 56m tall winding chimney features motifs of Egyptian lotus flowers while, on the plinth, replicas of the Chimeras (Gargoyles) from Notre Dame in Paris look out over the city of Copenhagen.

== Historical gardens ==
The Carlsberg area contains two historic gardens dating back to the early years of the brewery.

=== Carlsberg Academy Garden ===
The Carlsberg Academy Garden used to be the private garden of J. C. Jacobsen and is an English-style garden constructed in 1848. It is shielded from the surroundings by trees and hedges and contains winding paths, lawns and a pond. Soil from the construction of the brewery's extensive system of cellars. The garden boasts many rare trees and plants, some of which were brought home by J. C. Jacobsen from his travels.

=== Ny Carlsberg Garden ===
The New Carlsberg Garden is the former private garden of Carl Jacobsen created in conjunction with his villa. It is made in a more stringent style than the Academy Garden and contains many replicas of classical sculptures. Located in the garden is a neo-gothic Venetian with marble columns Garden Pavilion that finishes the garden complex as seen from the villa. Also located in the garden is the Ice House which was a building for the storage of natural ice used in the household. It is a small, circular building built in limestone. It has a wooden door and stained glass windows, a thatched roof and ornamentation by the roof with a spire-like bell.

== Carlsberg today ==
Since the production of beer on the premises was stopped at the end of 2008, the area is in the process of being transformed into a new district of Copenhagen. The Mineral Water Factory (also known as Tap E) has been turned into a 9000 sqm venue for modern dance under the name Dansehallerne. The former bottling plant Ny Tap has under the name Tap 1 been turned into a venue for various commercial and cultural events such as conferences, book and art fairs, concerts parties. It has a capacity of up to 6000 people. The Lime Tower Lighthouse now serves as an artist's studio and residence.

A new European School was inaugurated on 29 November 2018.

== Future development ==
Over the next 20 years, Carlsberg City will be rebuilt based on the plan of the Danish architectural firm Entasis. The plan won the award for “Best Master Plan” at the World Architecture Festival in Barcelona in 2009, and is inspired by the qualities of historic city centers. Modern architecture will soon blend with the historical Carlsberg buildings many of which are preserved or deemed worthy of preservation.

A total of 600.000 square meters will be developed. The development will be split, and approximately 45-60 pct. will be residential – this corresponds to a total of 3.000 homes. The remaining square meters will be occupied by businesses, retailers, culture and sport facilities, and institutions. The first stage includes establishing an 82.000 square meters campus for the 10.000 students attending the University College Capital. The campus will also include offices, retailers and private apartments. A new railway station, Carlsberg station, opened in July 2016. A lot of offices has already moved into new buildings in the old brewer area.

Entasis' masterplan for the area draws on inspiration from the classical, dense city, known from medieval city centre, rather than conventional modern developments. It is characterized by short, narrow streets and alleyways, unpredictability, many large and small squares. Nine slender highrises in heights between 50–120 metres will mark 9 of the area's most important urban space The plan focuses on:

- mixed use, buildings with shops, cafés and other public functions at street-level and housing and offices at upper floors, where there is more light.
- 24/7 activity and a lively and diverse urban life, centred around the squares, parks and other public spaces. The concept of shared space plays a central role in the plan.
- Cellars: Carlsberg's extensive several kilometres long network of underground corridors and cellars play a central role in the plan. Some will be opened up to create diverse, complex and idiosyncratic open spaces, others are kept as underground features.
- Greenness, the area already contains a large number of large trees. These will as far as possible be preserved, some places housefronts or streets are shaped to give room for existing trees. The two historical gardens in the area will be opened up as parks and supplemented with three new gardens.
- Sustainability, the area is planned to be Carbon neutral and employ a number of cleantech technologies.

== Ownership ==
The development company, Carlsberg Byen P/S, is responsible for developing the 25-hectare (62-acre) site that the company owns within the Carlsberg City District. The rest of the 33-hectare (82-acre) area is still owned by Carlsberg A/S. The development company is owned by four investors; Carlsberg, PFA Pension, PenSam and Nordea Pension.

== Cultural references ==
- On 16 February 1868 Hans Christian Andersen attended a dinner in J. C. Jacobsen's house, writing in his diary: "it was like a wealthy country home abroad [...] there is machinery to hoist the food. Gas in the stoves and wax candles in the lamps".
- Some of the now demolished Carlsberg buildings adjacent to the railway tracks are seen at 1:19:17 in the 1975 Olsen-banden film The Olsen Gang on the Track.

== See also ==
- Industrial Heritage Site (Denmark)
- Ny Carlsberg Glyptotek
- Jesus Church, Valby
- Porcelænshaven
- List of tallest buildings in Copenhagen
