= Domus Vista =

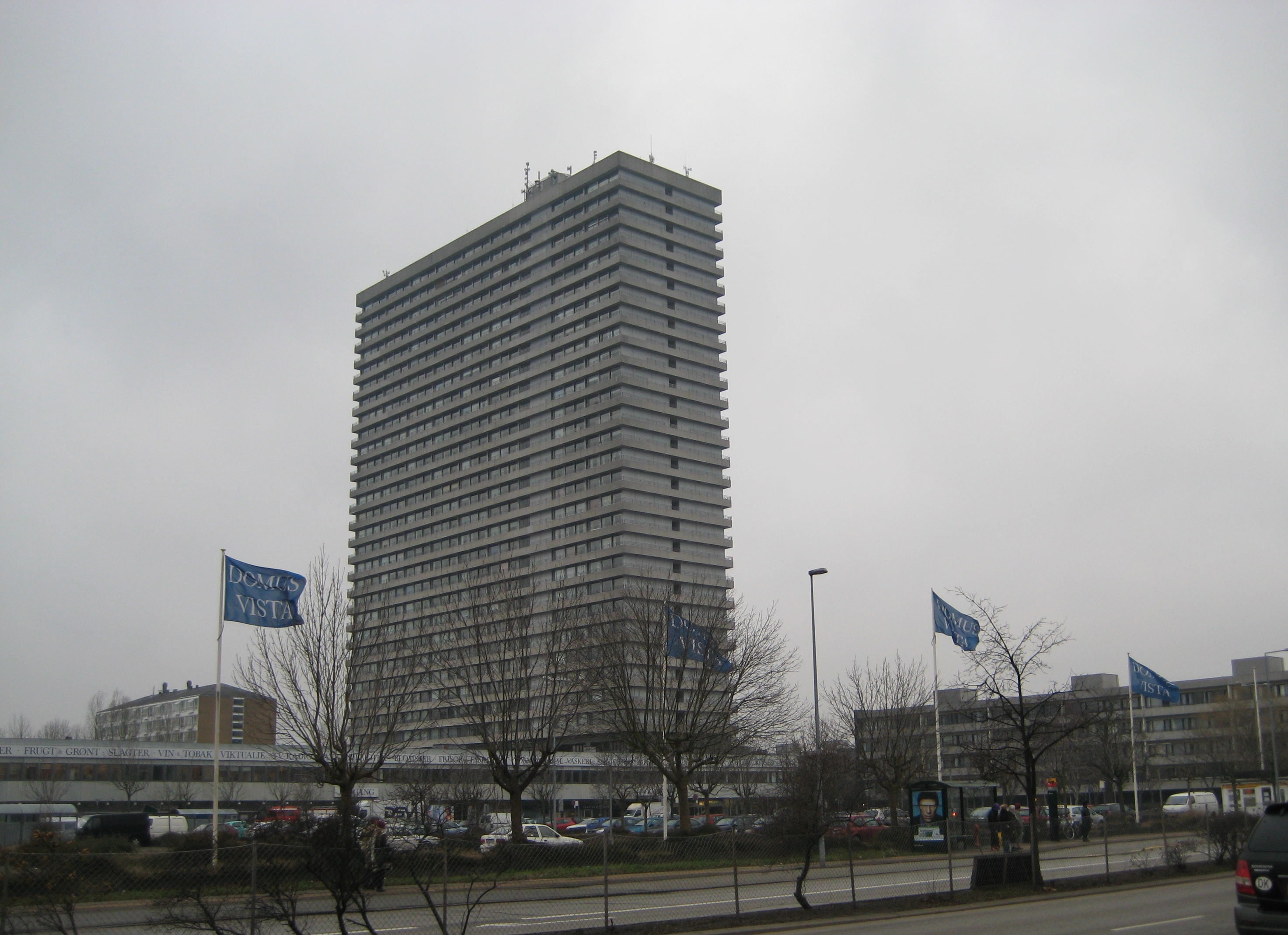
- Domus Vista
- Interactive map of the Domus Vista area

General information
- Status: Completed
- Type: Residential
- Location: Nordens Plads 4 Frederiksberg; Copenhagen, Denmark
- Coordinates: 55.670833°N 12.5005°E
- Completed: 1969

Technical details
- Floor count: 30

Design and construction
- Architect: Ole Hagen

References
- Domus Vista on www.emporis.com

Domus Vista is located in Copenhagen at Roskildevej in Frederiksberg and is, at 102 metres. At its completion the Domus Vista was the tallest residential structure in Denmark and Scandinavia.

== History ==
The building was designed by architect Ole Hagen and was completed in 1969. It was built by builder Harald Simonsen, who also took part in the construction of Hostrups Have in Frederiksberg.

Domus Vista has 30 floors and 470 apartments. The lower floors were originally a hotel with restaurant, banquet facilities and living rooms. The hotel was closed in the early 1970s. The ground floor now houses a shopping centre and library.
