= Vejen Art Museum =

Art museum in Denmark

Coordinates: 55°28′38″N 09°08′24″E

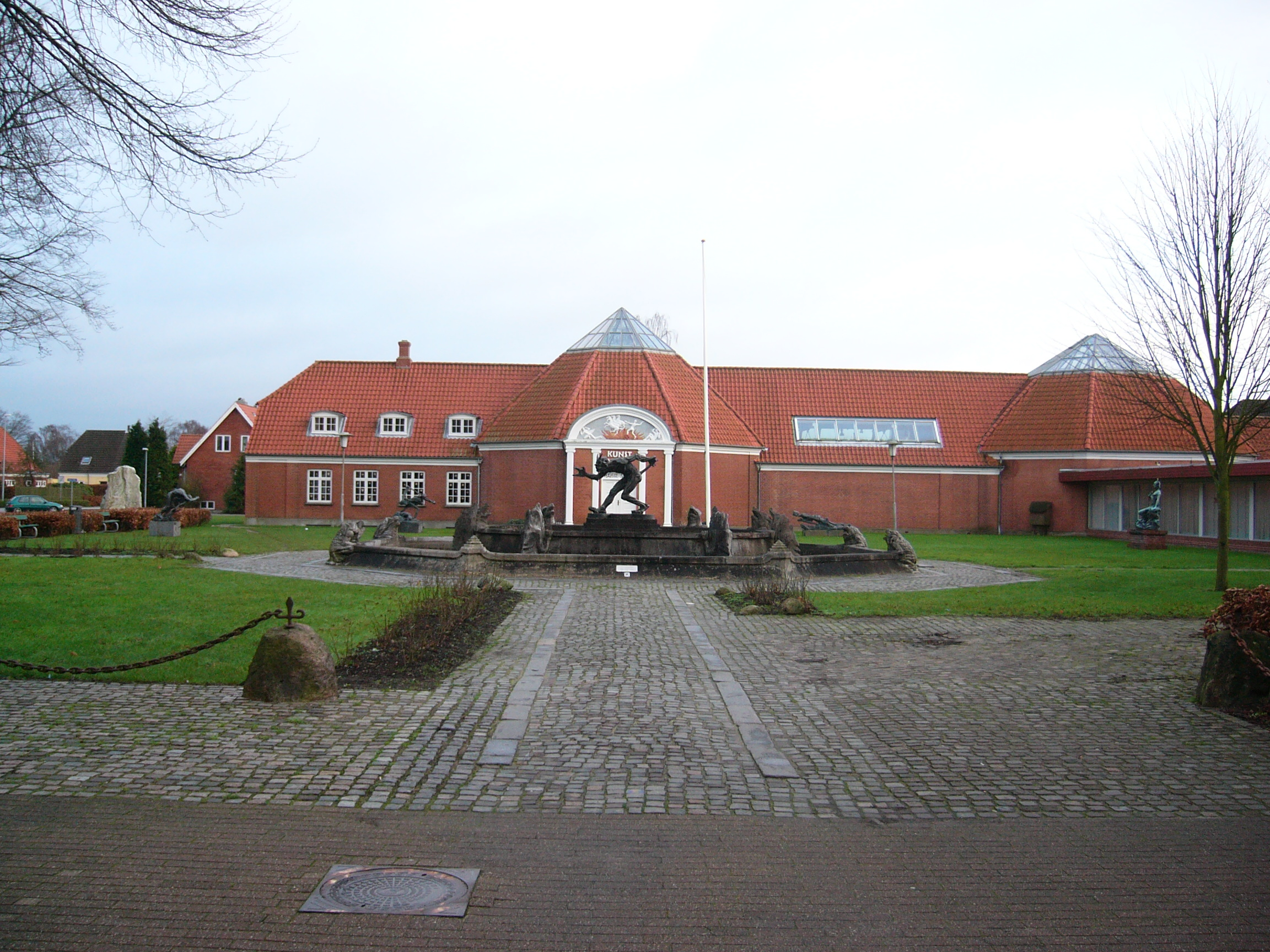
Vejen Kunstmuseum

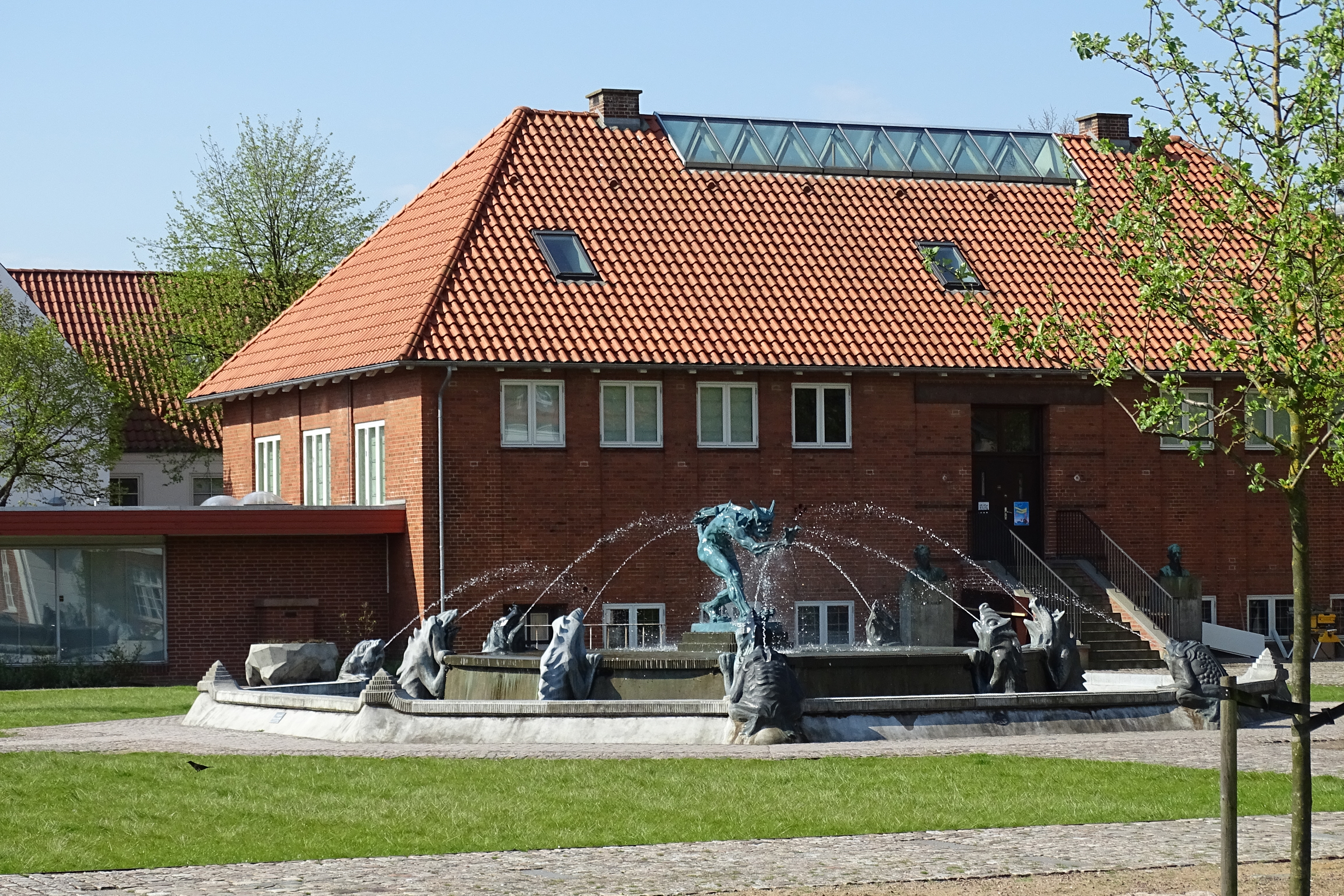
Trold, der vejrer kristenblod at Vejen Kunstmuseum

Vejen Art Museum (Danish: Vejen Kunstmuseum) is an art gallery in the town Vejen in the south of Jutland, Denmark. It specializes in works from the end of the 19th century in styles including Symbolism and Art Nouveau.

Created in 1924 to house the works of sculptor and ceramist Niels Hansen Jacobsen (1861–1941), it also displays works by Einar August Nielsen (1872–1956) Jens Lund (1871–1924), Thorvald Bindesbøll (1846–1908), Harald Slott-Møller (1864-1937), Ingrid Vang Nyman (1916-1956) and many others. The original museum building was designed by the local builder, Niels Ebbesen Grue (1879-1937). The museum has been expanded several times, the first time in 1938 and again in 1959. The gallery corridor was inaugurated in 1975.

Niels Hansen Jacobsen was most noted for creating the once controversial sculpture, Trold, der vejrer kristenblod. In 1923, a copy of the bronze sculpture was erected in front of the Vejen Art Museum.
