= Venus and Tannhauser =

Painting by Lawrence Koe

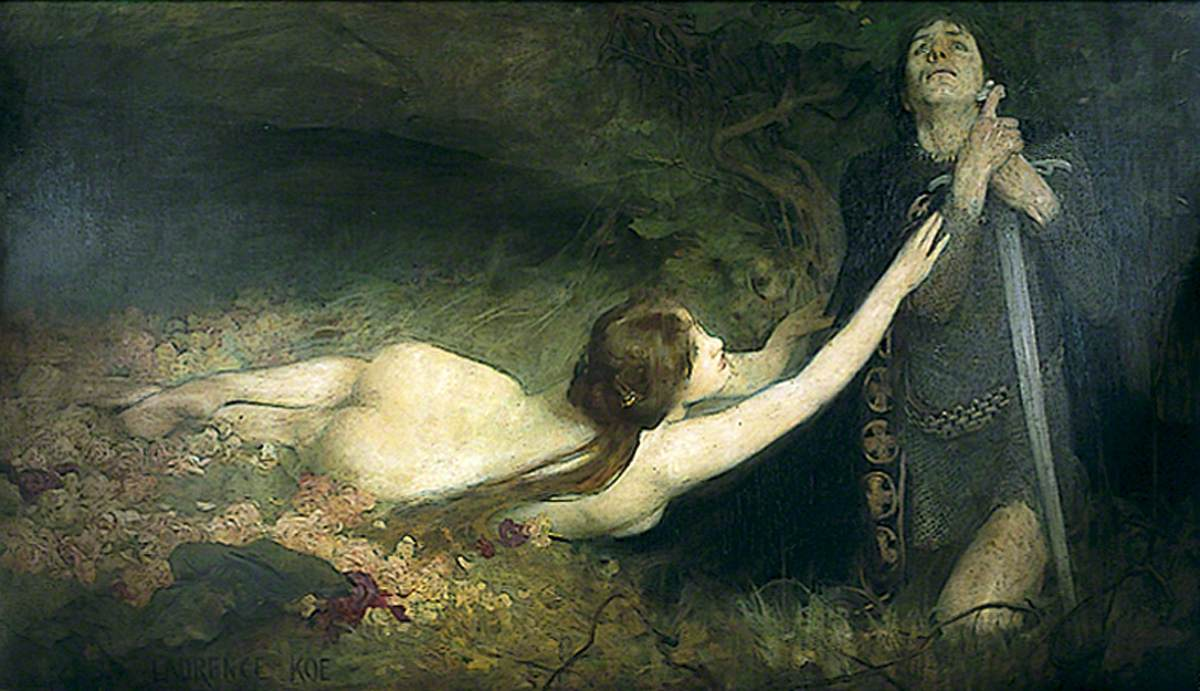
- Artist: Lawrence Koe
- Year: 1896
- Type: Oil on canvas, history painting
- Dimensions: 141.8 cm × 243 cm (55.8 in × 96 in)
- Location: Brighton Museum and Art Gallery, East Sussex

Venus and Tannhauser is an 1896 history painting by the British artist Lawrence Koe. It depicts a scene from the legendary myth of Venusberg. The story had famously inspired Richard Wagner's 1846 Romantic opera Tannhäuser. The painting has been described as the artist's magnum opus and a "voluptuous tribute" to Wagner.

Koe was a Brighton-born artist. He displayed the painting at the Royal Academy Exhibition of 1896 at Burlington House in Piccadilly, where it was widely acclaimed. The following year it featured at the Salon of 1897 in Paris, where it was awarded a gold medal. Today the painting is in the collection of the Brighton Museum and Art Gallery in his native Sussex.

== Bibliography ==
- Colombino, Laura & Saunders, Max. The Edwardian Ford Madox Ford. Editions Rodopi, 2013.
- Schulze, Cornelia. ':The Battle of the Sexes in D.H. Lawrence's Prose, Poetry and Paintings. Universitätsverlag C. Winter, 2001.
- Trimble, Michael R., Letellier, Robert Ignatius & Hesdorffer, Dale. Sudden Death in Opera: Love, Mortality and Transcendence on the Lyric Stage. Cambridge Scholars Publishing, 2021.
