= Ecce Homo (Juan Luna) =

Painting by Juan Luna

The Ecce Homo is an 1896 painting by award-winning Filipino painter and revolutionary activist Juan Luna. It is a "sensitive portrayal" of Jesus Christ. The portrait is one of several canvasses that Luna created while he and his brother Antonio Luna were imprisoned for eighth months by the Spanish authorities in the Philippines in 1896 because of sedition charges.
