= Niels Hansen Jacobsen =

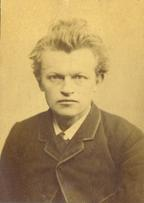
Niels Hansen Jacobsen

Niels Hansen Jacobsen (10 September 1861 – 26 November 1941) was a Danish sculptor and ceramist. He is most famous for creating the once controversial sculpture, Trold, der vejrer kristenblod. The name of the statue is taken from a story in Norse folklore where the hero hides in the troll's castle. Thereafter, whenever the troll enters the castle, he cries: "I smell a Christian man's blood!"

== Biography ==
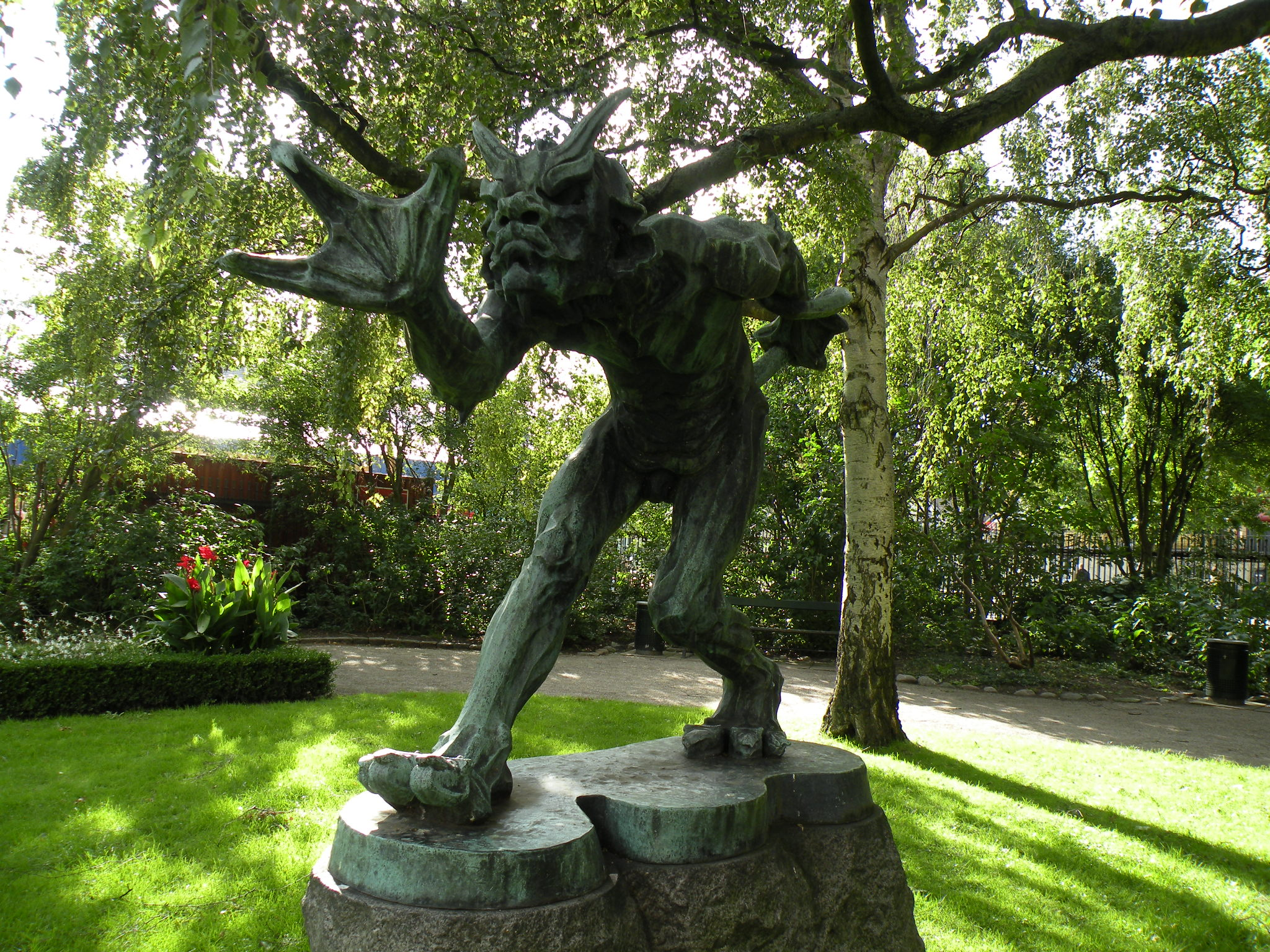
Trold, der vejrer kristenblod at the Ny Carlsberg Glyptotek

Niels Hansen Jacobsen was born and grew up on a farm in Vejen. He was the son of Carl Peter Jacobsen (1819-1903) and Anna Kirstine Hansen (1822–91). He attended the Royal Danish Academy of Fine Arts in Copenhagen between the years 1884–1888. At the Academy of Art, he received drawing lessons from Frederik Vermehren and Carl Bloch, while the sculptor Theobald Stein taught anatomy and Vilhelm Bissen in modeling.

He debuted at the Charlottenborg Spring Exhibition in 1889. He was awarded the Eckersberg Medal and a grant which led him to travel to Germany, Italy and France during 1891. In 1892, Hansen Jacobsen settled in Paris. From the mid-1890s, Hansen Jacobsen had also started working with ceramics. In 1902, Hansen Jacobsen returned to Denmark. In the years following his return to Denmark, a new field of work came to fill much in his production: cutting grave and memorial stones.

In 1908, he returned to work on sculpture. In 1913, Hansen Jacobsen erected a studio at Skibelund Krat near Askov. Between 1923 and 1924, a museum was built for the works of Hansen Jacobsen at the site of his birthplace. The museum was inaugurated on 1 July 1924, and is today the Vejen Art Museum (Vejen Kunstmuseum).

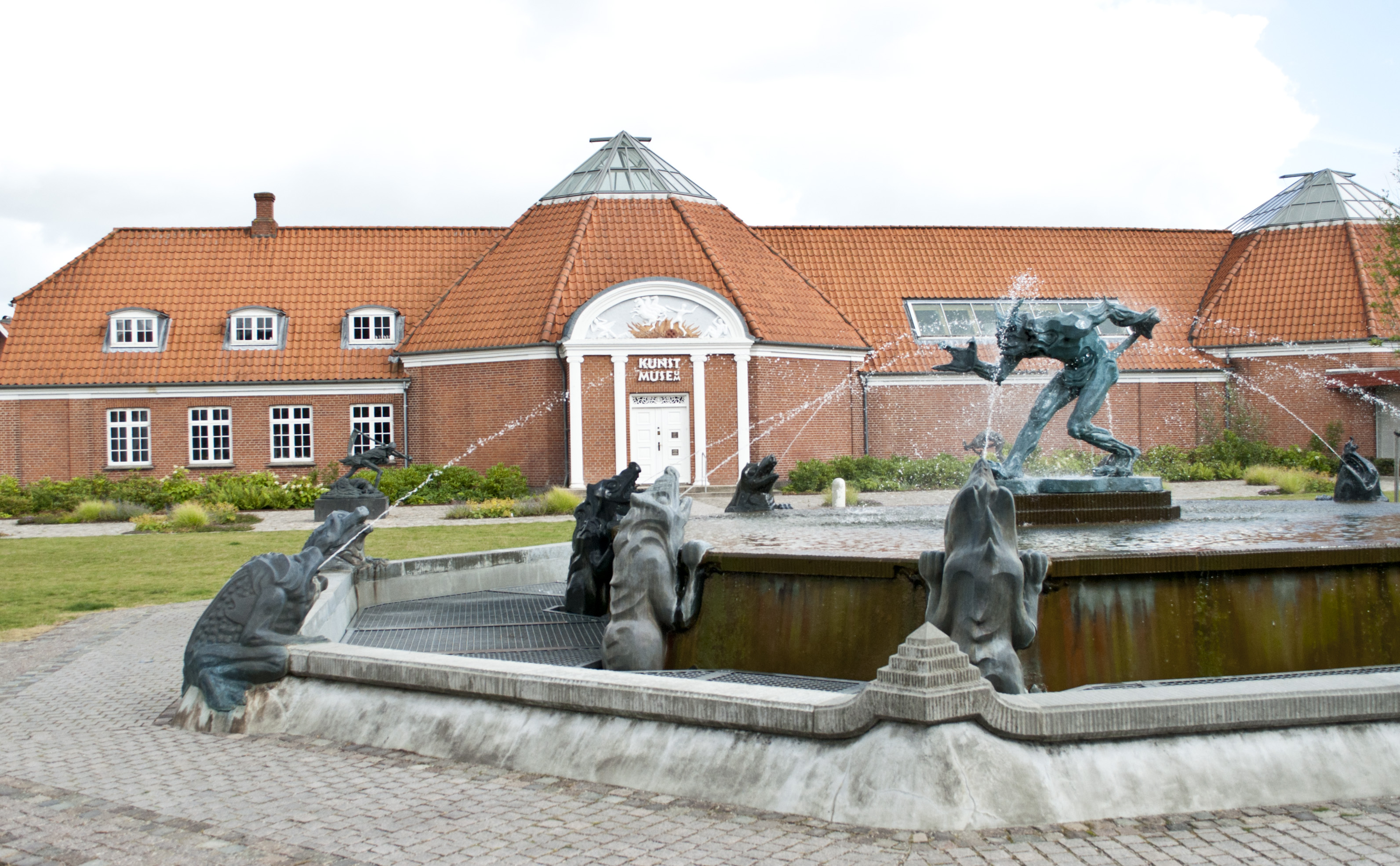
Vejen Kunstmuseum

== Work ==
Existential themes such as freedom and time affect Niels Hansen Jacobsen throughout much of his sculptures. With his imaginative and strangely symbolic sculptures, Hansen Jacobsen gave form to abstract phenomena such as death, night and shadow.

== Personal life ==
In 1891, he married Anna Gabriele Rohde (1862-1902). In 1908, he married Kaja Jørgensen (1882-1928). In 1936, he was awarded the Thorvaldsen Medal. He died during 1941 and was buried at Vejen Church.

== Gallery ==
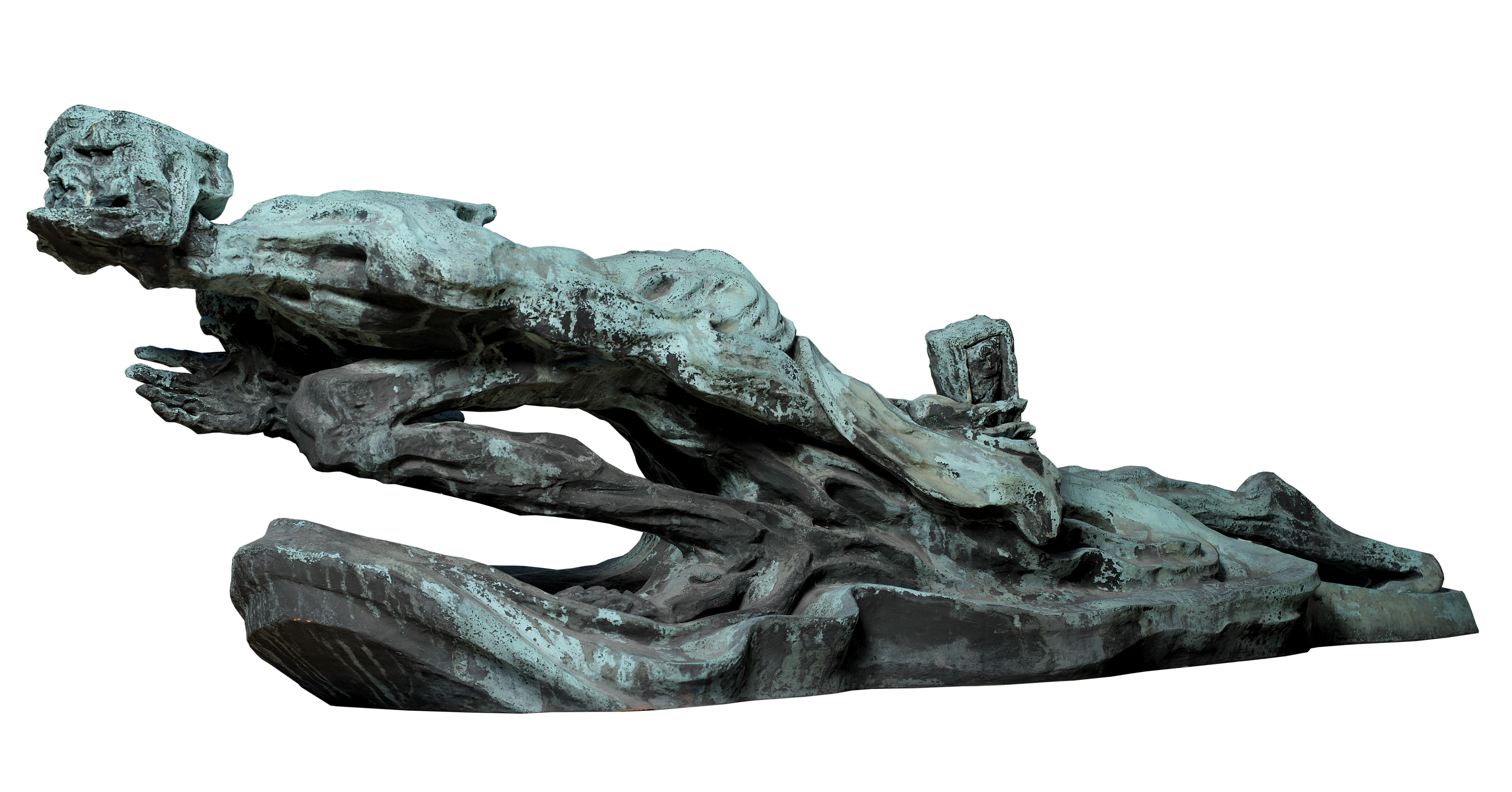
Skyggen (1897–98)

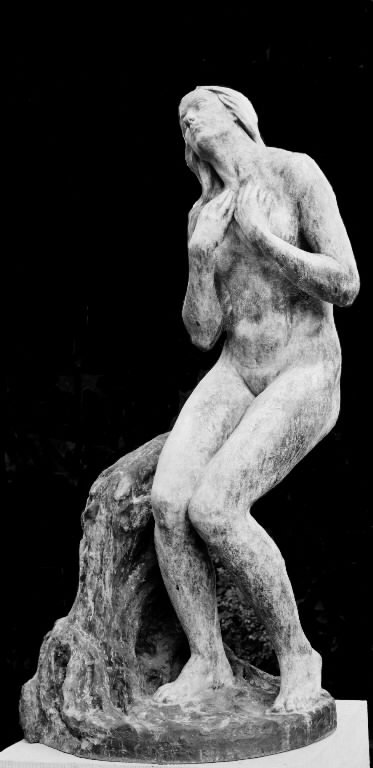
Dryaden (1918)

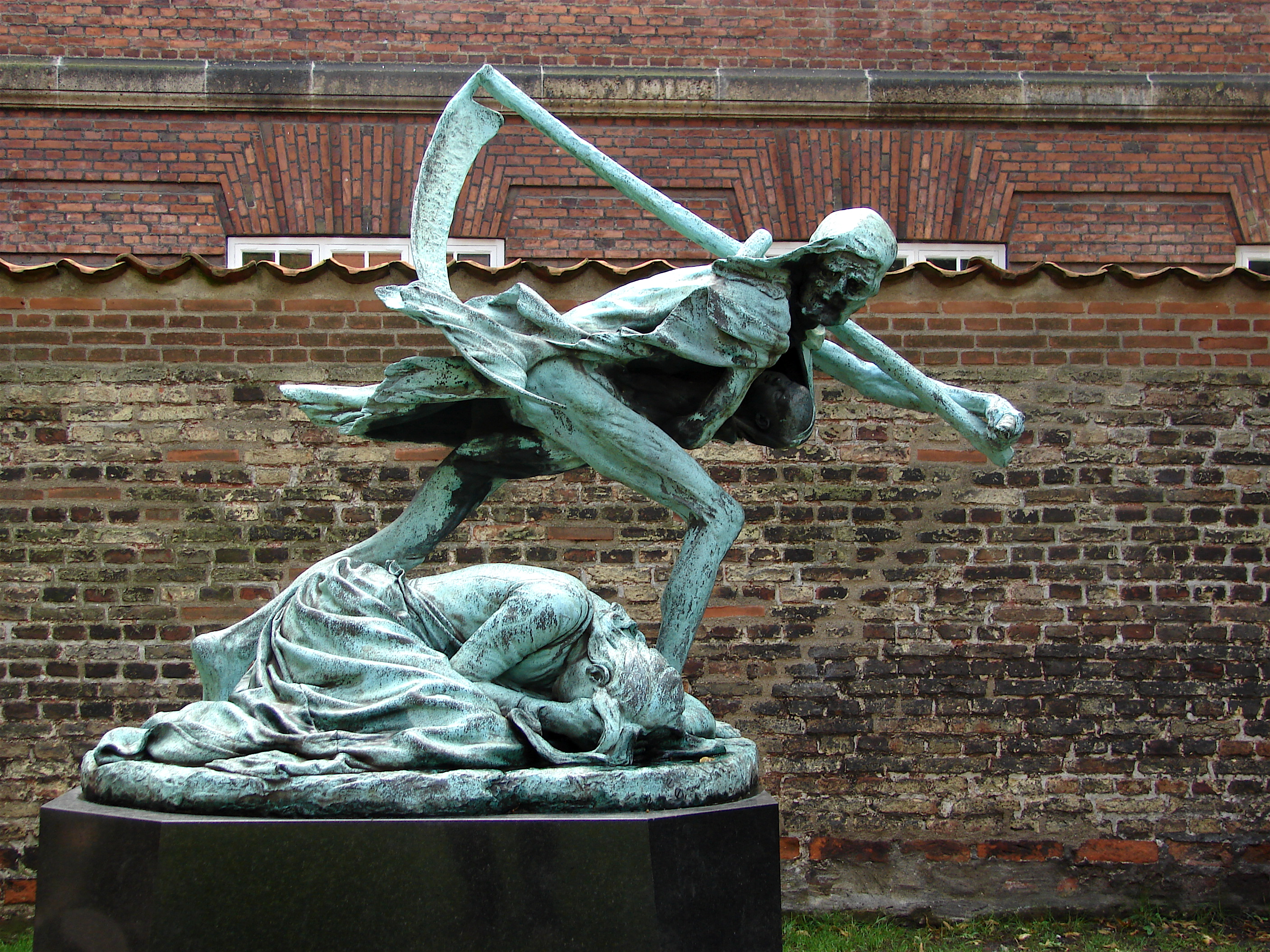
Døden og moderen (1892)

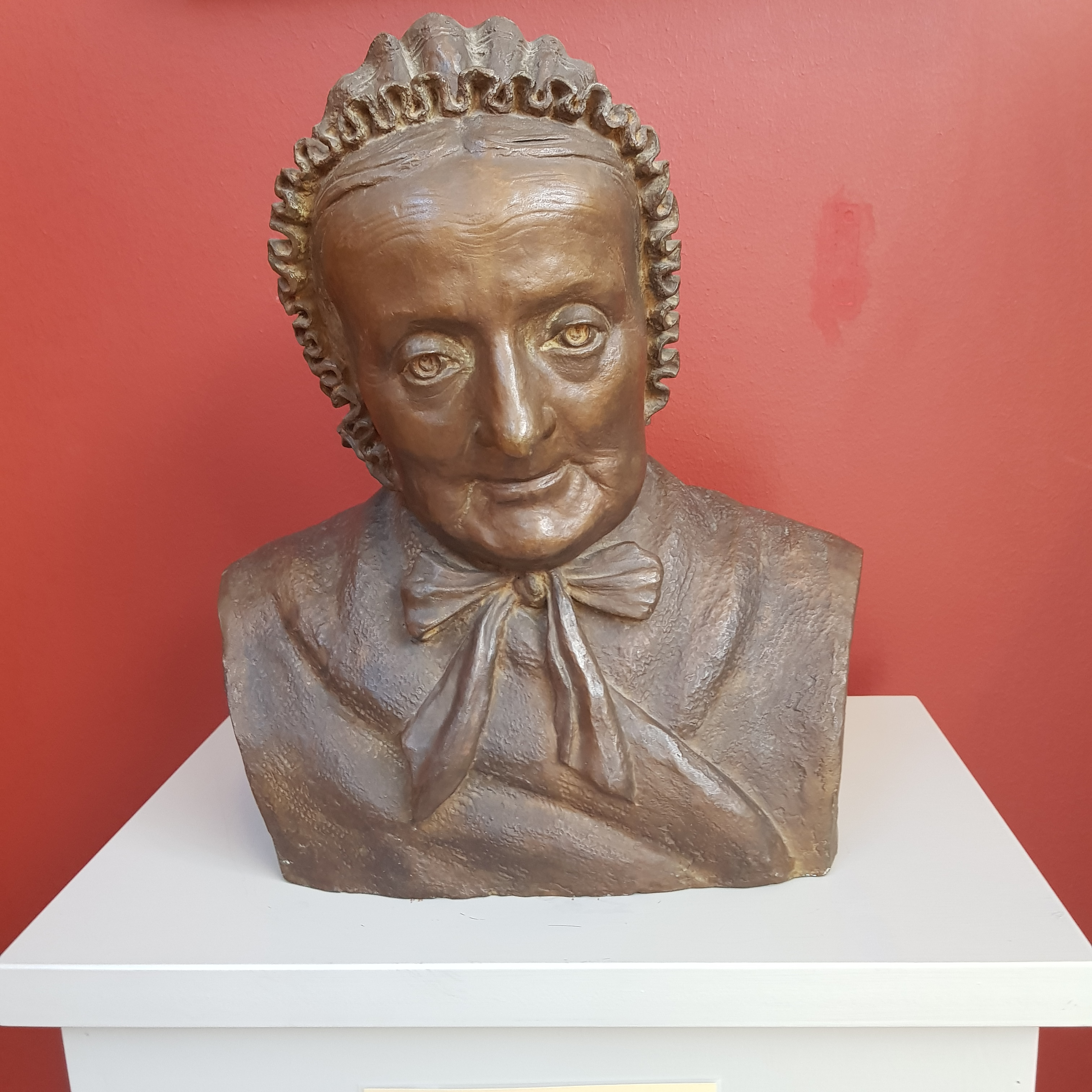
Bust of Jacobsen's mother

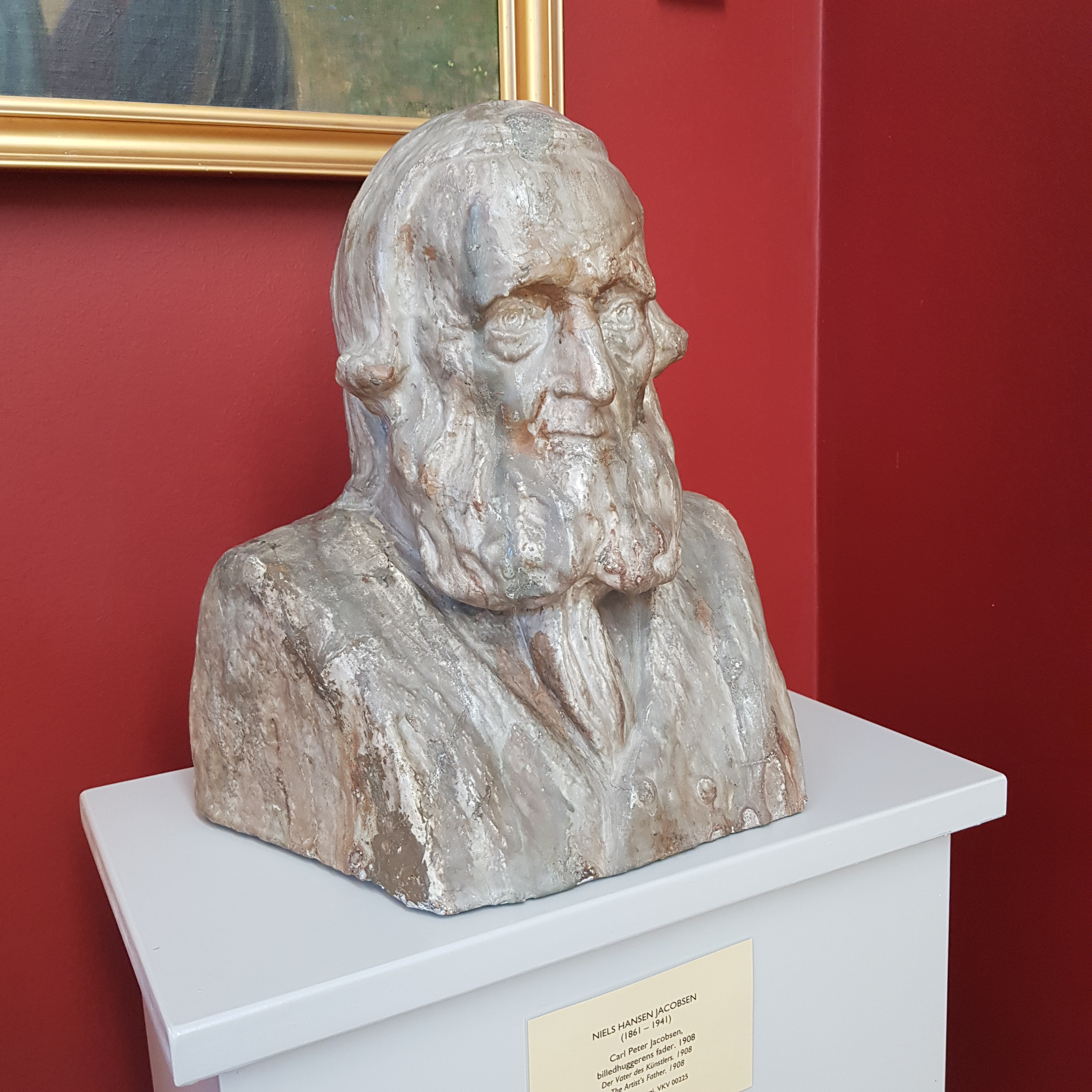
Bust of Jacobsen's father

== See also ==
- Danish sculpture

== Other sources ==
- Teresa Nielsen (2011) NHJ : Niels Hansen Jacobsen (Vejen Kunstmuseum) ISBN 978-87-87316-07-1
- Herman Madsen; Niels Th. Mortensen (1990) Dansk Skulptur (Odense: Skandinavisk Bogforlag )
