= View of Vesuvius from Capri =

1896 view of Mt. Vesuvius from Capri by Charles Caryl Coleman

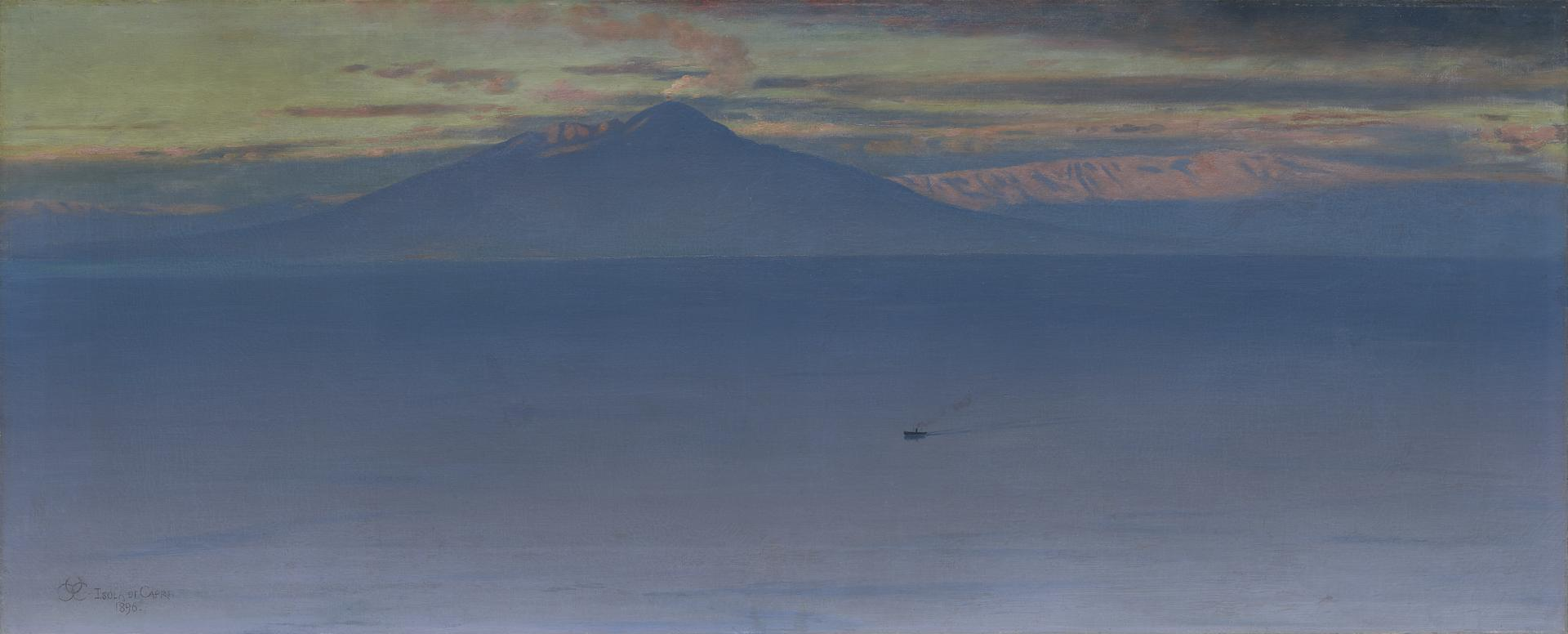
- Artist: Charles Caryl Coleman
- Year: 1896
- Medium: Oil on canvas
- Subject: Mt. Vesuvius
- Dimensions: 47 cm × 114.9 cm (18.5 in × 45.25 in)
- Location: Yale University Art Gallery, New Haven, Connecticut
- Owner: Yale University
- Accession: 2026.14.2
- Website: https://artgallery.yale.edu/collections/objects/335577

View of Vesuvius from Capri is a 1896 oil-on-canvas painting by American artist Charles Caryl Coleman, depicting a view of Mount Vesuvius from his residence, the Villa Narcissus at Capri, his residence from 1870 until his death in 1928.

During that period of time, he frequently painted and observed Vesuvius' volcanic activity in many subsequent paintings over the decades. It was acquired by the Yale University Art Gallery in 2025, and has been displayed in the 2nd floor of the American Art Pre-1900 gallery ever since.

== Description ==
=== Provenance ===
The earliest documented ownership reported after the painting's inception was through a French-Israeli collector, who put it on auction through Christie's on 4 March 2010 as part of its Fine American Paintings, Drawings, and Sculpture lot. It went unsold and a few months later on 3 June 2010, it was purchased by Christie's chairman Marc B. Porter, who owned it for the next 15 years. On 13 November 2025, Porter donated the work to the Yale University Art Gallery, to where it was registered with an accession number of 2026.14.2.

=== Painting ===
After the American Civil War, Coleman spent the 1860s travelling and living in Europe before converting an old covenant in Capri into his residence in 1870, where he would reside for the rest of his life. Therein, he would produce 300 paintings, many of which are dedicated to the view of his residence.

The villa where he lived provided an eastward view of Vesuvius and the mainland. From the 1890s, Vesuvius started to show increased volcanic activity, with effusive activity over the years, filling the summit crater or the growth of its summit cone, sometimes with a height shift of 150 meters from its crater rim. From 1895-1899, during the time Coleman painted View of Vesuvius from Capri, 120 meters of lava formed a volcanic shield known as the Colle Umberto, followed by a new crater, which shifted from 200 meters to 60 meters due to landsliding.

In a review of an retrospective of his exhibit at Avery Galleries in New York City in 1899, Charles DeKay describes Coleman's obsevations:

From his island home Mr. Coleman has watched the mass of Vesuvius with its plume of smoke through all the changing seasons of the year, and through the varied lights and shades of the twenty-four hours from sunrise to sunrise. He has eight small views in pastel and oil which he calls the “Songs of Vesuvius.”

From this period of time, Coleman would continue to observe the changes and increased activity of the volcano, while shifting between oil and pastel, with varying styles starting from his inspiration from French Impressionism.
