= Charles Caryl Coleman =

American painter

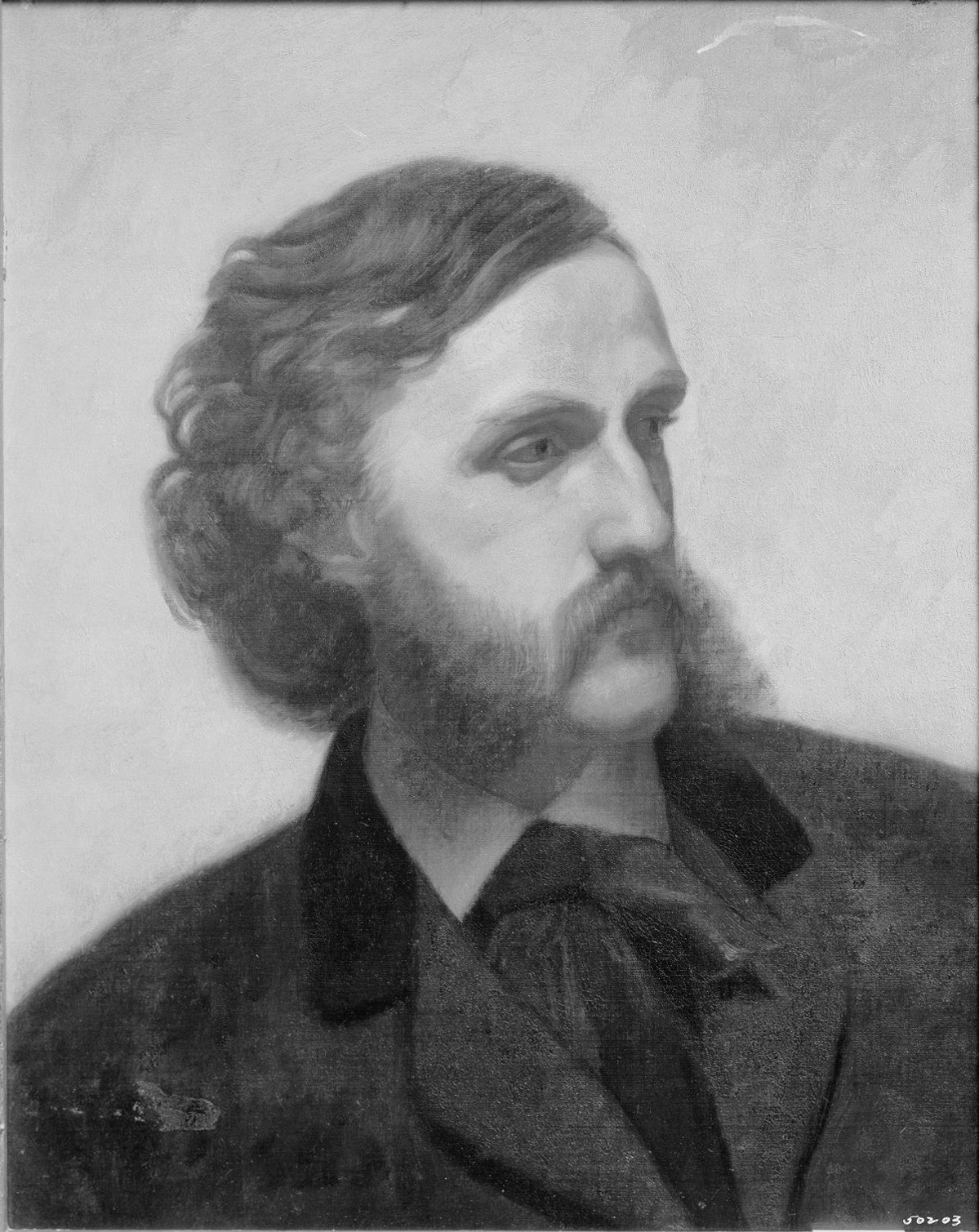
- Portrait of Coleman by Oliver I. Lay, ca. 1876
- Born: April 25, 1840; Buffalo, New York, US
- Died: December 5, 1928 (aged 88); Capri, Italy
- Spouse: Mary Alsager (after 1875)
- Parent(s): John Hull Coleman; Charlotte Augustus

Charles Caryl Coleman (April 25, 1840, in Buffalo, New York – December 3, 1928, in Capri, Italy) was an American artist.

== Early life ==
Coleman was born in Buffalo, New York to John Hull Coleman (1813) and Charlotte Augusta (née Caryl) Coleman. His younger brother was Caryl Coleman (1847–1930), an ecclesiologist, church glass manufacturer and decorator who was educated at Bellevue Medical College and Canisius College, and who married Nonna Agnes Black. Caryl opened the church department of the Tiffany Company in New York in 1889 and operated it for 10 years. In 1899 he founded the Church Glass and Decorating Company of New York which manufactured a variety of decorative and stained-glass windows for various churches, academic institutions, and other private and public buildings.

His maternal grandparents were Capt. Benjamin Caryl and Susan Young. His paternal grandparents were Charles H. Coleman (1787–1880) and Doreas (née Hull) Coleman (1791–1822). Charles was a descendant of Thomas Coleman of Marlborough, Wiltshire, England, who came to Boston in 1635 and moved to Nantucket in 1663 after living in Newbury, Massachusetts.

He was raised in Buffalo and studied art under William Holbrook Beard "and an itinerant painter, Andrew Andrews whose real name was Isaacs."

== Career ==
Between 1859 and 1862, Coleman studied in Paris under Thomas Couture, returning during the American Civil War to serve with the Union Army during which he was seriously wounded in South Carolina and recovered in Sharon Springs, New York. He returned to Europe in 1866 with fellow painters William Morris Hunt and Elihu Vedder. In 1865, he was elected into the National Academy of Design as an Associate Academician.

From 1863 to 1866, Coleman maintained a studio in New York. It was first at 840 and later at 896 Broadway. He regularly showed his work in the exhibitions of the Brooklyn Art Academy and the National Academy of Design in New York.

In 1866, he left America again and spent time painting in London, Paris, and Brittany. He then moved to a Roman apartment previously occupied by poet John Keats, living there from the late 1860s to the mid-1880s, before finally settling in Capri.

Coleman's decorative panels constitute his greatest contributions to nineteenth-century art. These paintings, which represent attenuated branches of flowering fruit trees or azaleas, can be compared only to the oversized stained glass panels of John La Farge and Louis Comfort Tiffany. Embodying all of the characteristics of the international aesthetic movement, they also depict Japanese fans, Chinese pots, maiolica vases, Venetian vases, Islamic tapestries, and Indian textiles.

In 1893, Coleman returned to the United States briefly. While there, he was commissioned to paint and decorate the interiors of the New-York State Building at the Chicago World's Fair, along with fellow artists Frank D. Millet and Elmer E. Garnsey.

In 1899, Avery Galleries at 368 Fifth Avenue in New York held an exhibition with forty of his pictures and drawings. Another was held there in 1902, featuring over fifty paintings and pastels made by Coleman. The place of honor was given to his contribution to the 1901 Pan-American Exposition, held in his hometown of Buffalo, titled Saintly Dreams by Early Moonlight. It was a saint with a solid golden halo, flowing black hair, a red gown, and a branch of red roses on her lap. The New York Times stated that she "seems to have felt the languor and bewitchment of a Capri moonlight. She lounges on a white-tiled bench between round stucco columns, flowering shrubs in pots before her, and above her head a lattice running from pillar to pillar. Strong shadows fall about her from the moonlight, leaving her head in the shade."

=== Capri ===
In 1870, he converted the guesthouse of the former convent of Santa Teresa into Villa Narcissus. A part of the villa was dedicated to a "palace of art" with antiquities and his own paintings. One of Coleman's friends, Dr. Allan McLane Hamilton, a grandson of Treasury Secretary Alexander Hamilton, lived for a short time in Villa Castello, a villa near Villa Narcissus.

Villa Narcissus was later partly purchased from him by Rose O'Neill, his friend and also an American artist; he gave her the other half. O'Neill, who is famous for having invented the Kewpie Doll, permitted Coleman to live out the remainder of his days there, and he remained at the Villa until his death in 1928.

== Personal life ==
In 1875, Coleman married Mary Edith Grey Alsager (d. 1906), who worked with the Red Cross during the Franco-Prussian War of 1870, treating both French and German soldiers. They did not have any children and Mary predeceased him.

In his June 1916 will, he bequeathed all of his estate in a life trust fund for the benefit of his brother, Caryl Coleman (d. 1930). The will further dictates that after his brother's death, the estate shall go to his friend, Mrs. Rose O'Neill Wilson, of Saugatuck, Connecticut. In the event that Mrs. Wilson died before his brother, the property goes to Anita Vedder (1873–1954), the daughter of his friend Elihu Vedder of Capri. In the event all predeceased him, the estate would go to the American Academy in Rome.

== Exhibitions ==
One-man exhibitions of his work were exhibited at:

- 1899 – Avery Galleries, New York, New York
- 1902 – Avery Galleries, New York, New York
- 1906 – Thomas C. Hoe Gallery, New York, New York
- 1907 – St. Botolph Club, Boston, Massachusetts
- 1907 – John Herron Art Institute, Indianapolis, Indiana
- 1907 – Detroit Institute of Arts, Detroit, Michigan
- 1907 – Saint Louis City Art Museum, St. Louis, Missouri
- 1907 – Buffalo Fine Arts Academy, Buffalo, New York
- 1912 – Buffalo Fine Arts Academy, Buffalo, New York

== Works ==
His work was exhibited in the United States and England, including:

- Early Morning-Capri, Albright-Knox Art Gallery
- The Antiquary, Albright-Knox Art Gallery
- The Capri Girl, Albright-Knox Art Gallery
- Oil Press, Anacapri-Capri, Albright-Knox Art Gallery
- In the Garden of Villa Castello, Albright-Knox Art Gallery
- Music in the Moonlight, Detroit Institute of Arts
- The Return from the Crucifixion, Brooklyn Museum
- Study of Elihu Vedder, Coleman's friend
- Portrait of Walter Savage Landor, a commission of the poet and essayist
- The Bronze Horses of San Marco, Venice, 1876, Whitney Museum of American Art
- View of Vesuvius from Capri, 1896, Yale University Art Gallery
- Vesuvius from Pompeii, Detroit Institute of Arts
- The Vesuvius Eruption of 1906, date unknown, Brooklyn Museum
- Christ Walking on the Sea, Seaman's Institute
- Mural designs for the Church of St. Ignatius Loyola, New York City for the Ecclesiastical Department of the Tiffany Glass and Decorating Company.
- Quince Blossoms, 1878, Virginia Museum of Fine Arts

== Gallery ==
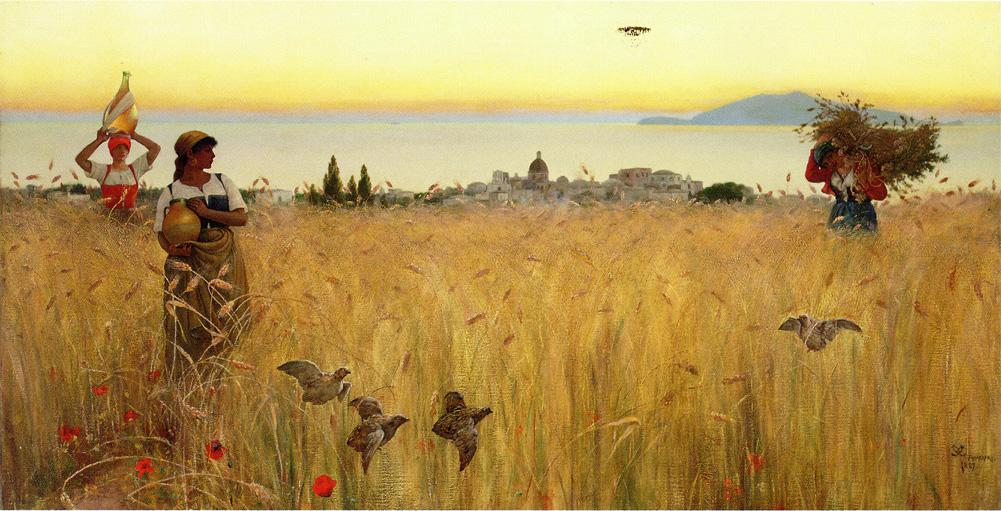
Women in the Wheat Fields, Anacapri (1887) was sold at a Christie's auction in 2004 for $600,000.

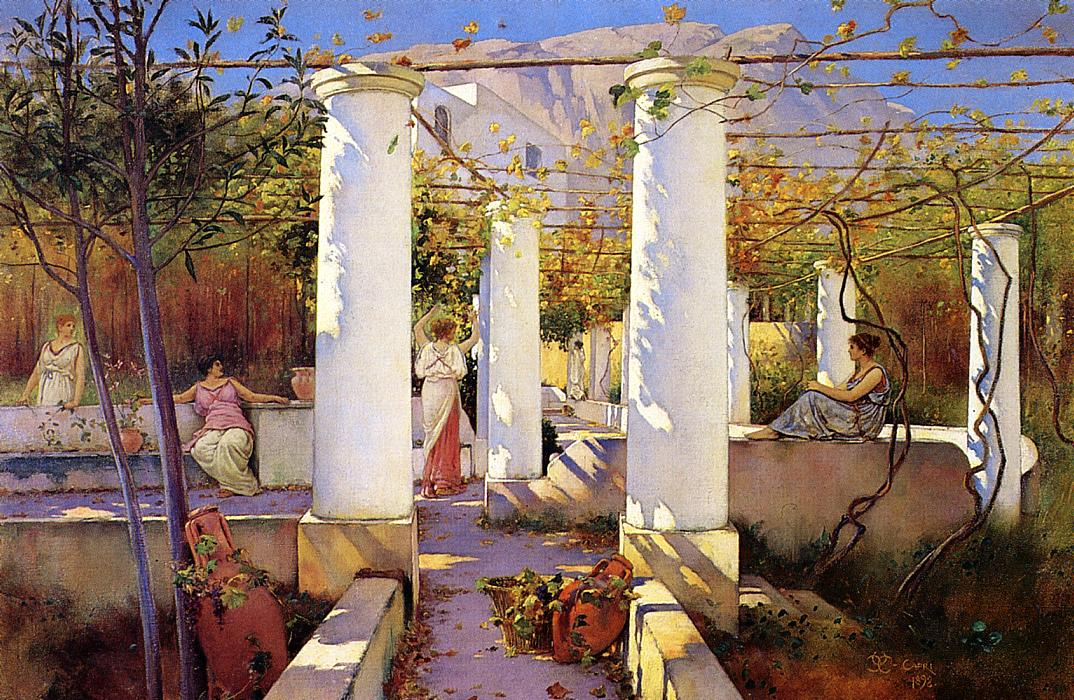
In the Shade of the Vines, Capri (1898)

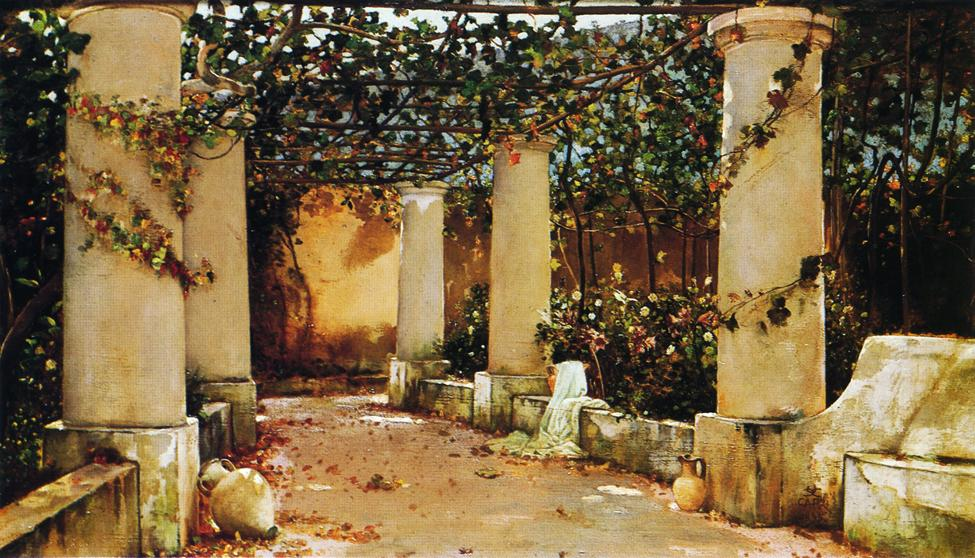
The Villa Castello, Capri (1895)

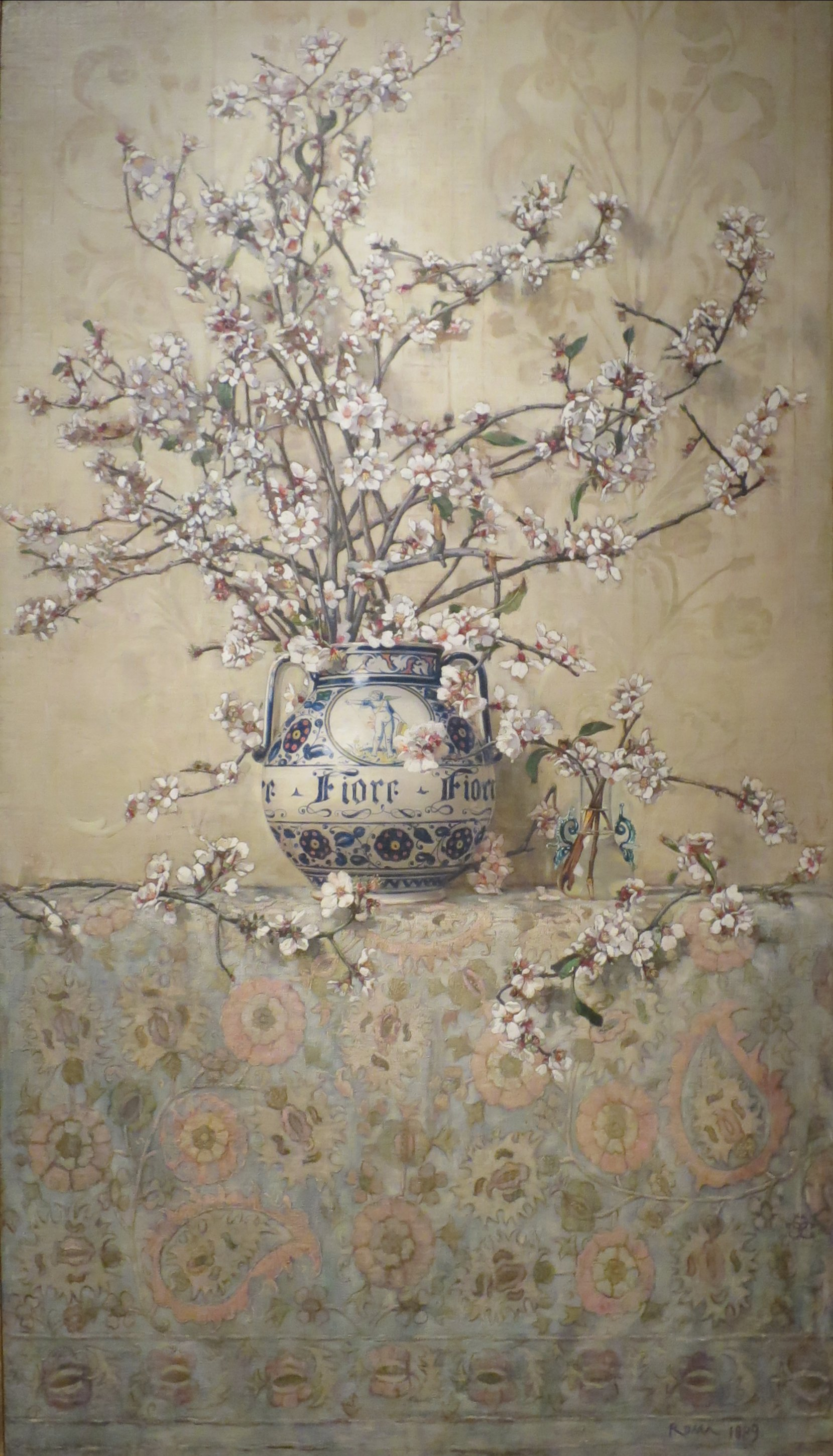
Apple Blossoms (1889)

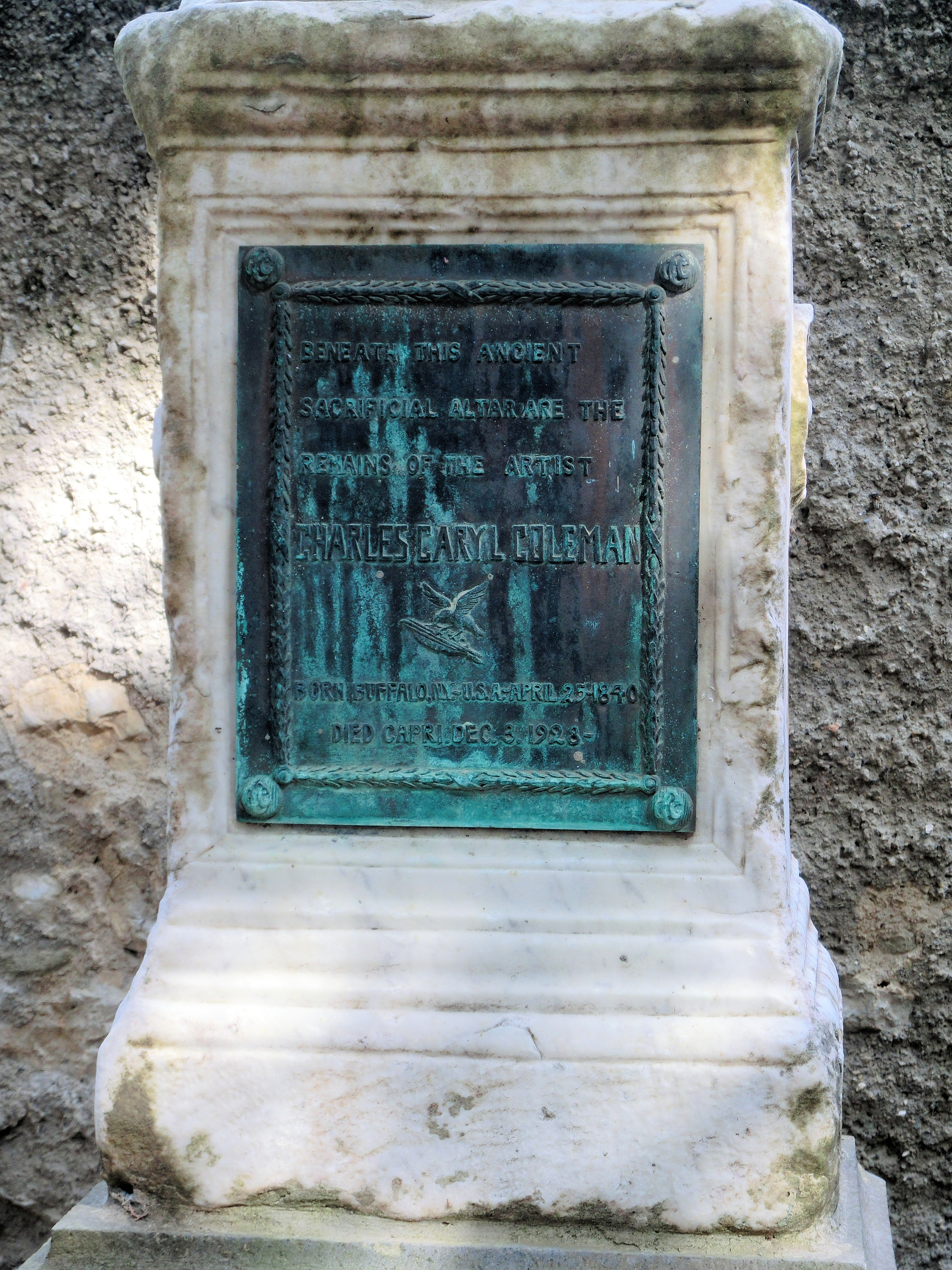
Coleman's grave on Capri

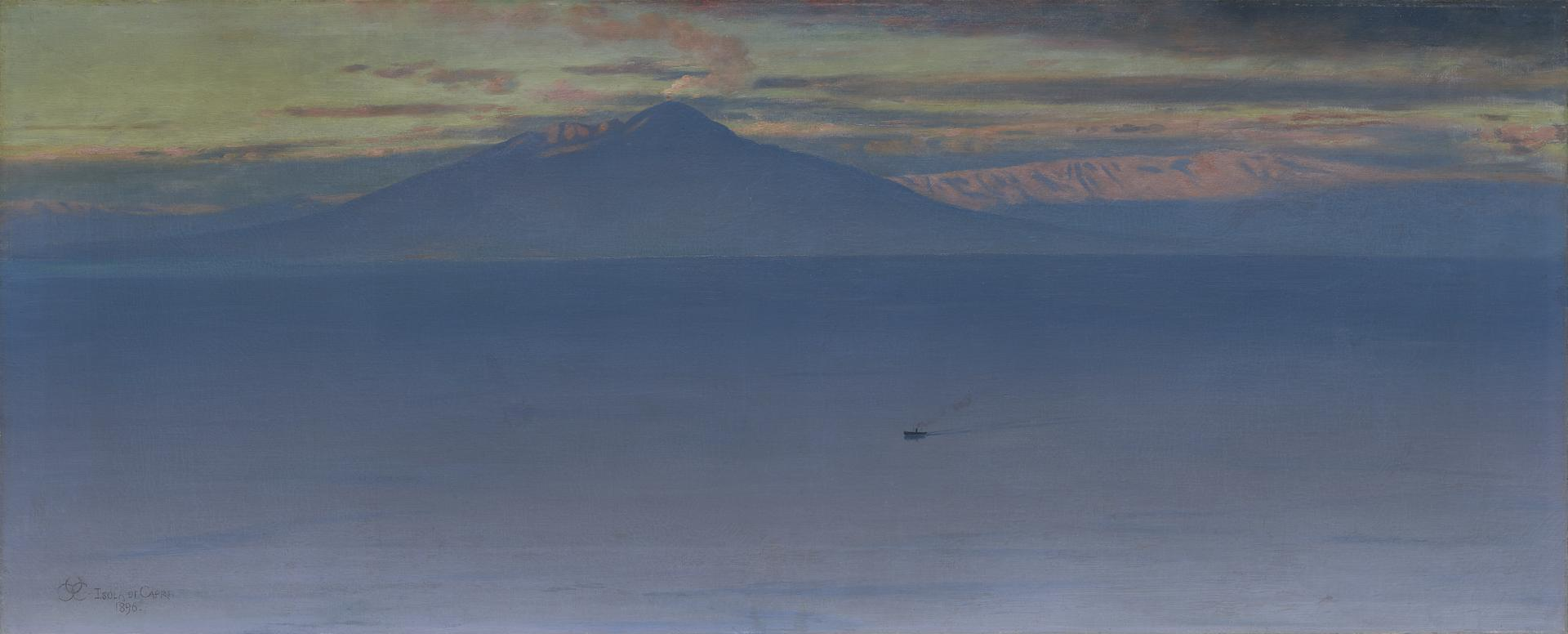
View of Vesuvius from Capri (1896)
