= Trold, der vejrer kristenblod =

Coordinates: 55°40′20″N 12°34′15″E

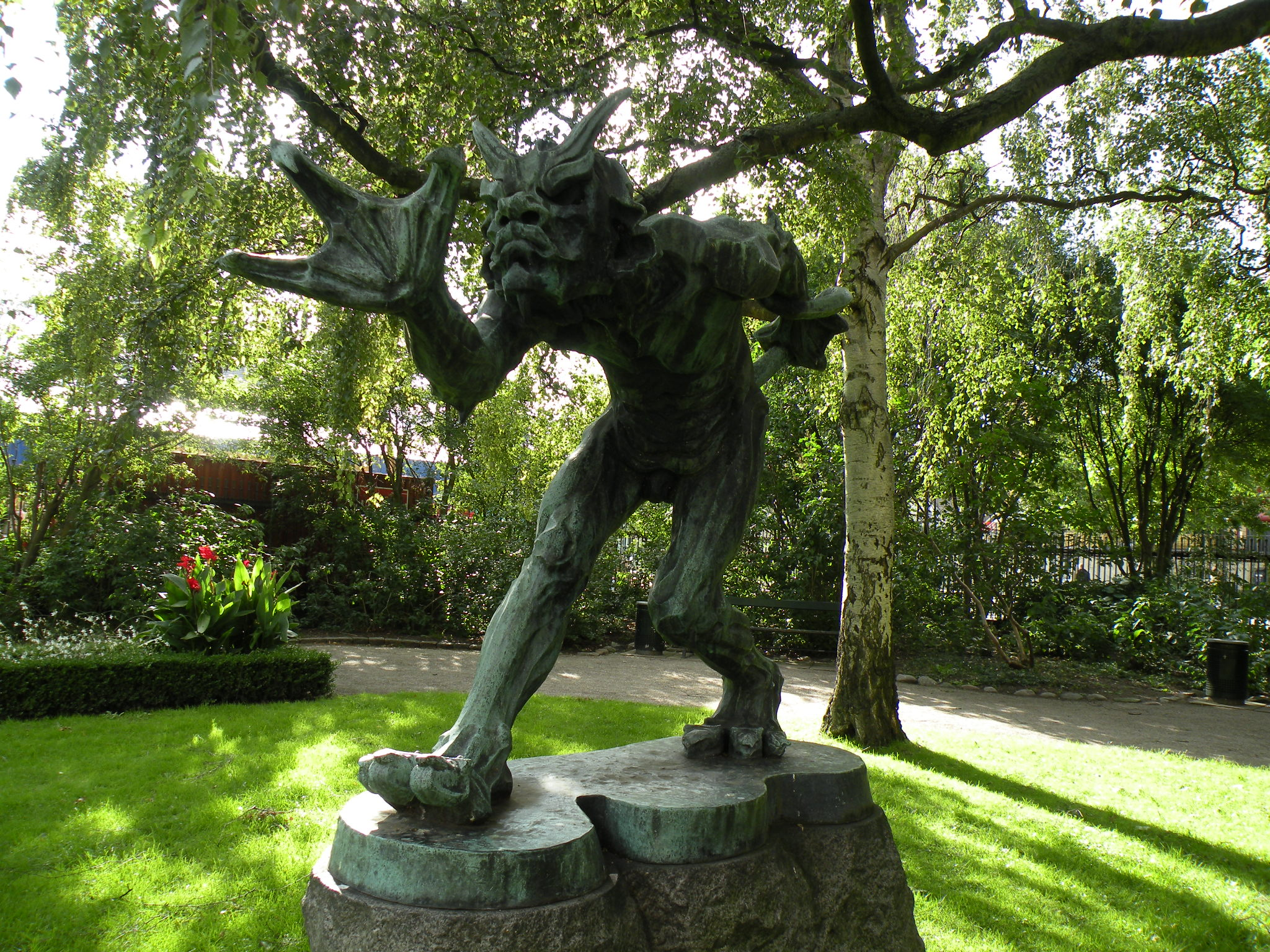
Trold, der vejrer kristenblod Ny Carlsberg Glyptotek

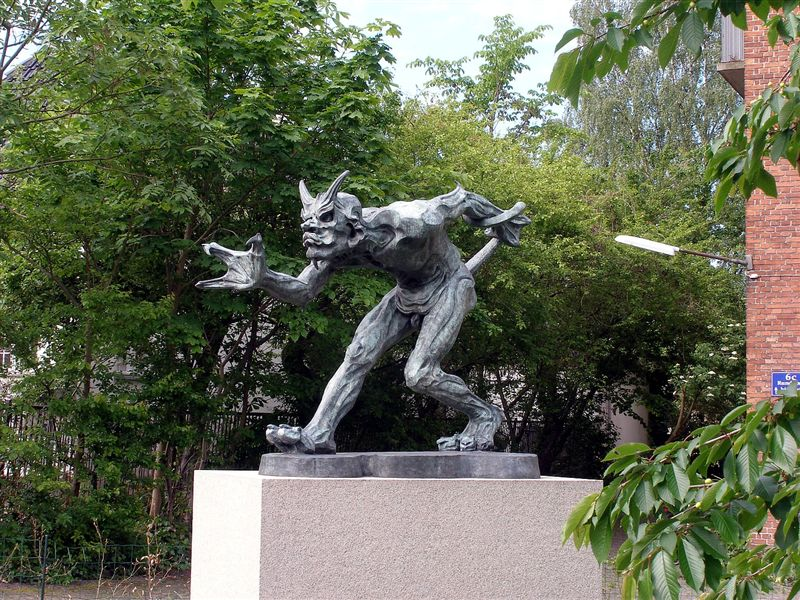
Trold, der vejrer kristenblod Jesus Church, Valby

Trold, der vejrer kristenblod (English: Troll that smells Christian blood) is a bronze sculpture made by Niels Hansen Jacobsen (1861–1941).

The sculpture was modelled between 1895 and 1896. The plaster edition was exhibited at the Charlottenborg Spring Exhibition in 1897. A bronze cast was ordered by brewer Carl Jacobsen in 1901–02. It was originally placed in front of Jacobsen's Church in Valby, Copenhagen, now known as Jesus Church (Jesuskirken), but was too controversial for the parish, so it was moved to the garden of the art museum Ny Carlsberg Glyptotek. In 1923, a copy was erected in front of the Vejen Art Museum. In 2002, the church wanted the sculpture back, but the Glyptotek would not part with it, so a copy was made, and placed in front of the church.

The name of the statue is taken from a story in Norse folklore where the hero hides in the troll's castle. Thereafter, whenever the troll enters the castle, he cries: "I smell a Christian man's blood!"

== See also ==
- Ny Carlsberg Glyptotek
- Jesus Church, Valby
