= Charles E. Brown (photographer) =

English aviation photographer

- Born: 20 January 1896
- Died: 9 October 1982 (aged 86)
- Occupation: Commercial aviation photographer

Charles E. Brown (20 January 1896, Wimbledon, London – 9 October 1982, Storrington, West Sussex, UK) was a commercial aviation photographer (but also other types of aviation photography) working for United Kingdom newspapers, the aviation industry and a freelance commercial photographer with official accreditation as a war correspondent. His aviation archive of 30,000 images has been preserved at the RAF Museum, Hendon since 1978.

== Biography ==
Born in 1896, his father Edward James Brown was a butcher with premises situated in Arthur Road, Wimbledon. For his 14th birthday he was given a small camera and in 1911 captured an image of a Balloon landing in Southfields, London. The photography of an Edwardian gentleman balloonist in trouble was published in the Daily Mirror and the newspaper paid Charles Brown a fee of a half-guinea. The art-editor of the Daily Mirror, Hannen Swaffer asked Charles Brown to consider a career in newspaper photography when he left school and he joined aged 16 to learn how to develop film and print photographs in the in-house Daily Mirror darkrooms under the guidance of Bernard Alferi.

=== War service ===
In 1915 Charles Brown applied for a posting to the Photographic Section of the Royal Naval Air Service and was turned down. After continuing to work on photographic assignments for the Daily Mirror in the United Kingdom, he was eventually drafted to the 532nd Agricultural Depot, Royal Engineers as a medical orderly based at Wrexham, Wales. After passing a trade test in photography with the Royal Engineers on 10 August 1918, Brown had further photographic work with the Royal Air Force at their official London Photographic Centre. Leaving military service on 17 January 1919, Brown rejoined his pre-war colleagues at the Daily Mirror newspaper.

=== Freelance photographer ===
After former Daily Mirror staff had left in the post-war period to establish a press agency, Charles Brown also left the Daily Mirror and established his own freelance press photography business. Specialising in travel, including promotional materials and media, he also specialised in railway photography and in 1924 a snapshot of a boy talking to a driver of a Southern Railway King Arthur class locomotive on platform 4 of Waterloo station was used in railway posters for the next 10 years with the slogan 'South for Sunshine'.

After the success of the Southern Railway poster, this allowed Charles Brown to expand and diversify his freelance press business to include the developing aviation in the 1920s and 1930s. Accepting photographic commissions from major aircraft manufactures from Fairey Aviation Company, de Havilland and Supermarine to help these companies market new aircraft. This was followed by commissions from the Air Ministry and the Admiralty for the Fleet Air Arm. This allowed him to photograph many Royal Air Force air displays and RAF stations.

In 1940 his business premises in Fleet Street, London were bombed during The Blitz shattering many glass negatives. Work during wartime included commissions for Aeronautics magazine. A wartime commission for Flying magazine in the United States included a rare supply of Kodachrome and Ektachrome film.

== Gallery ==
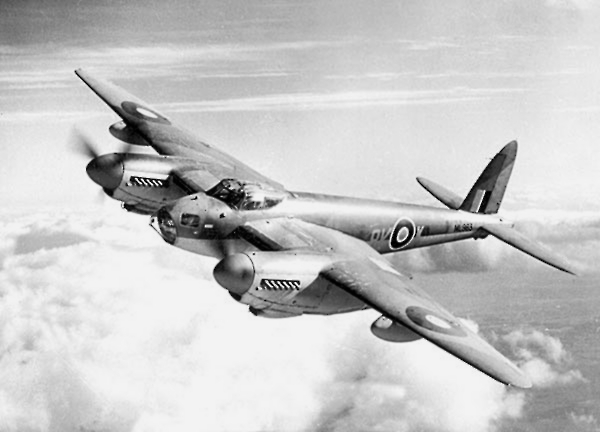

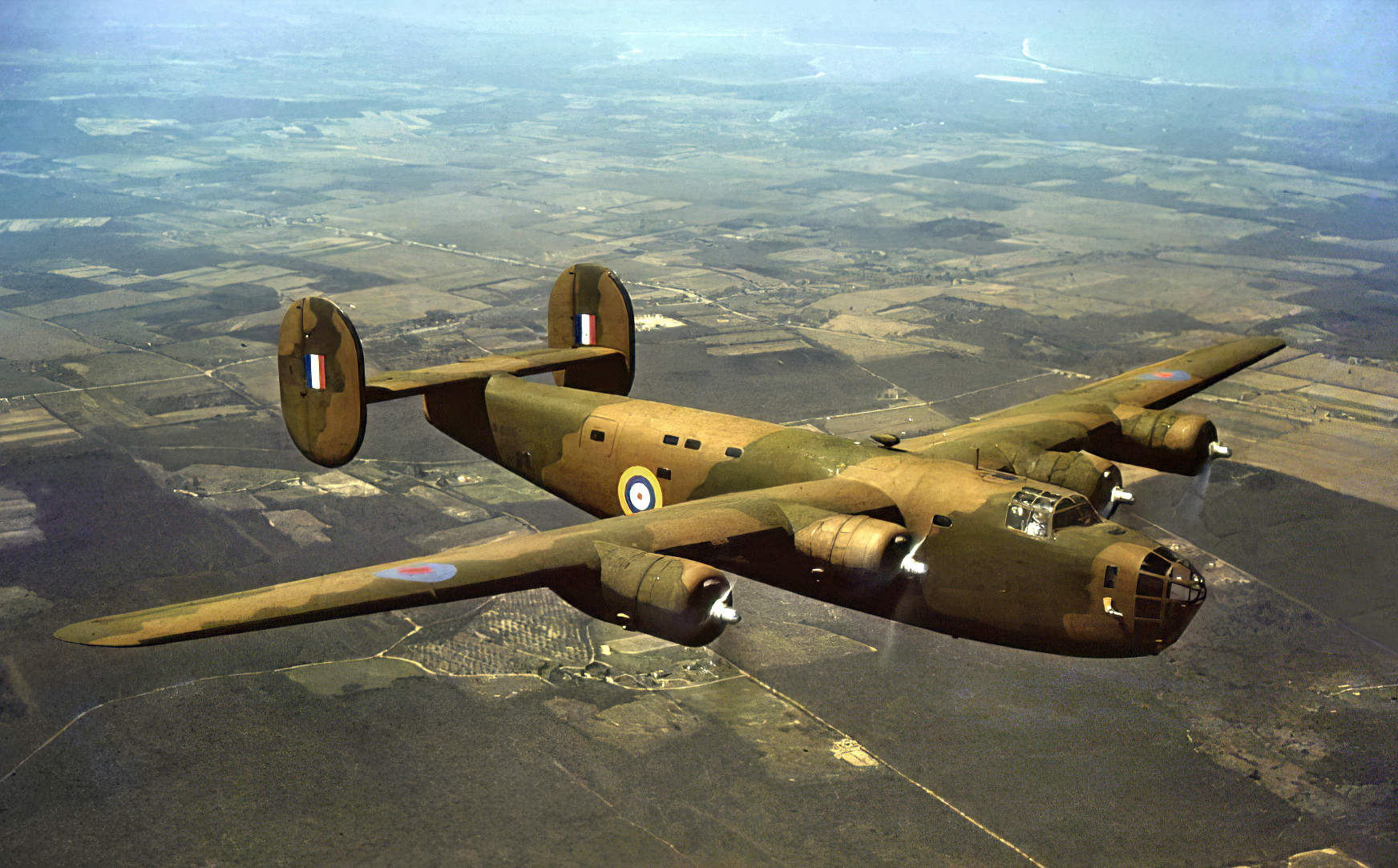

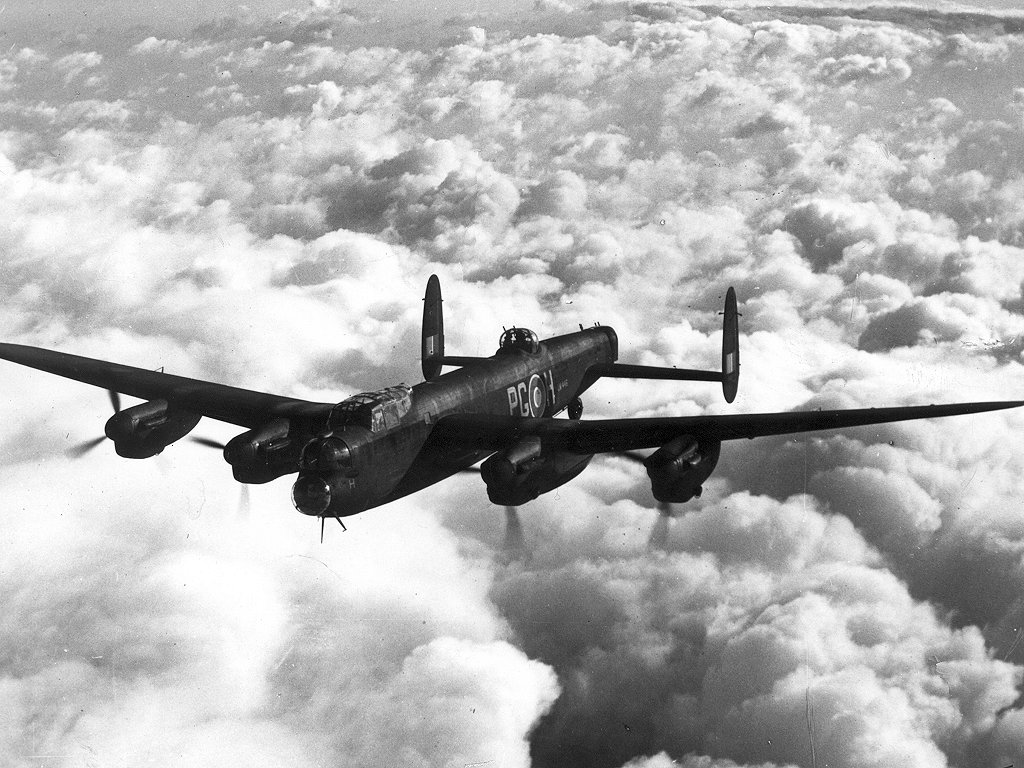

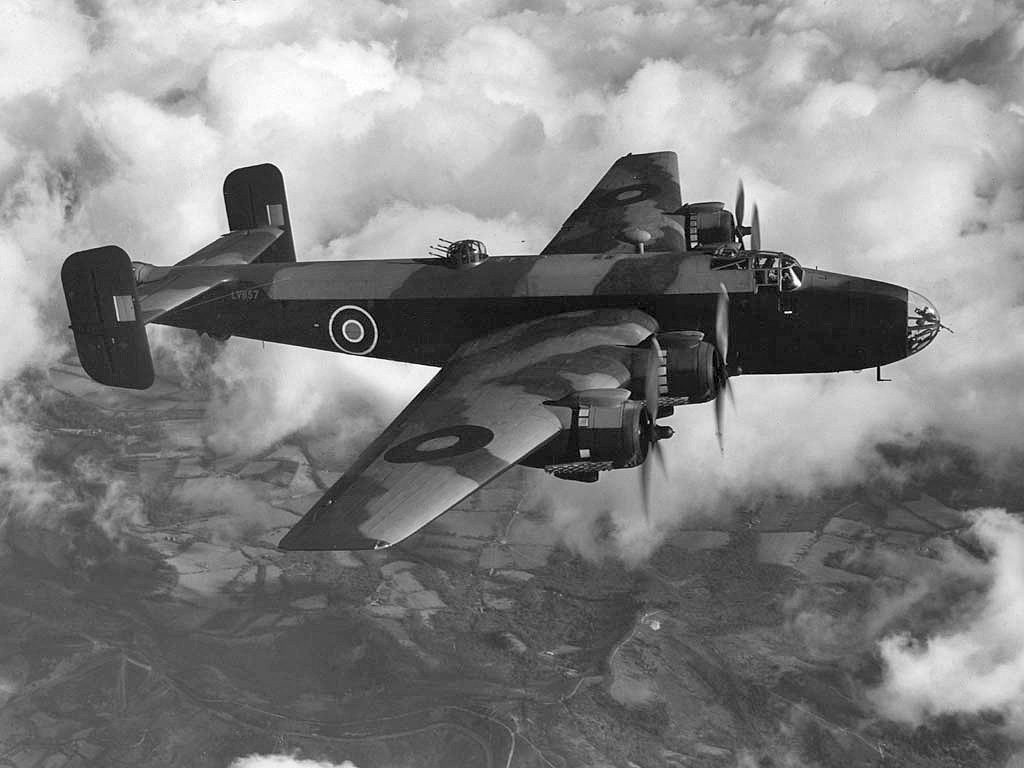

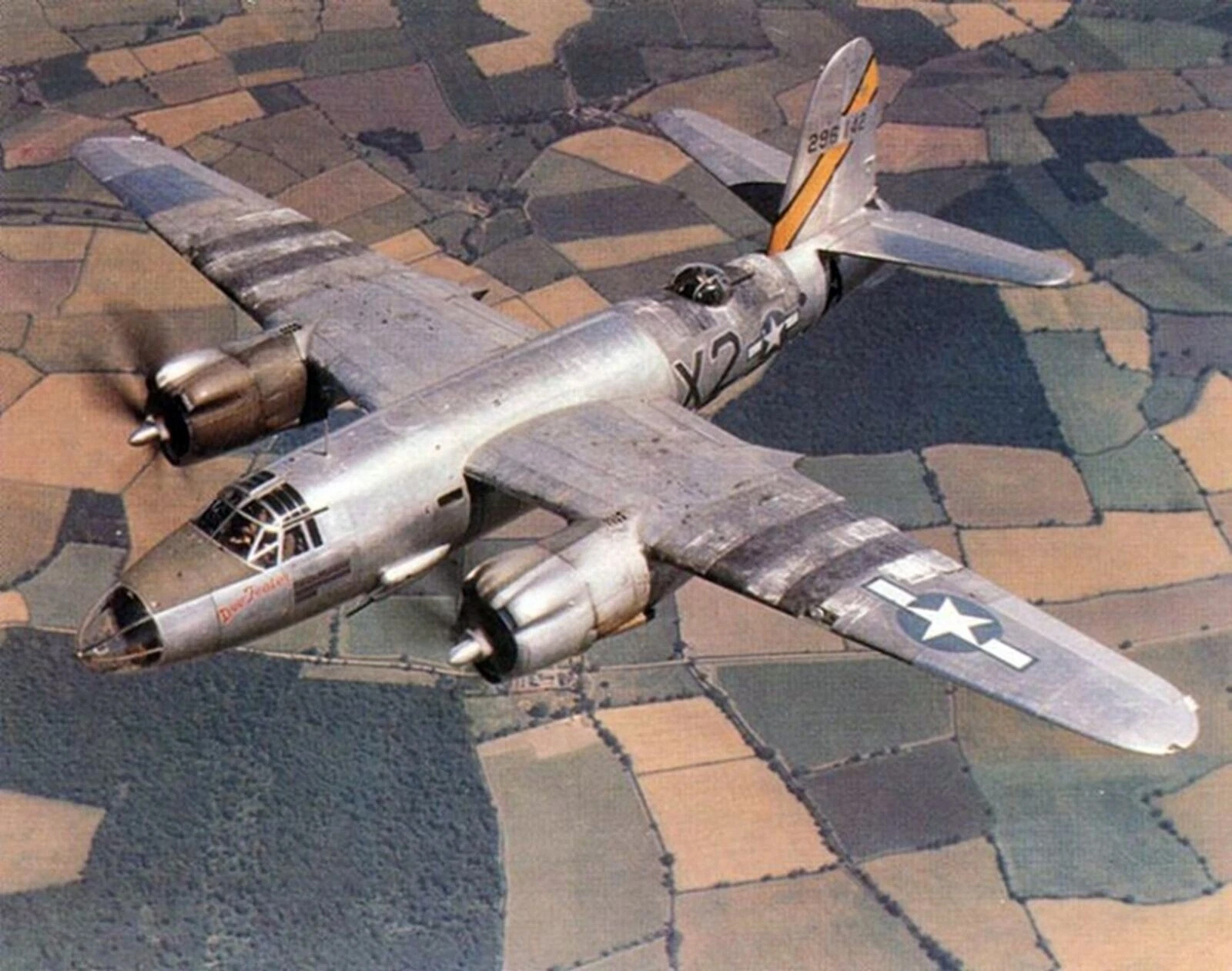

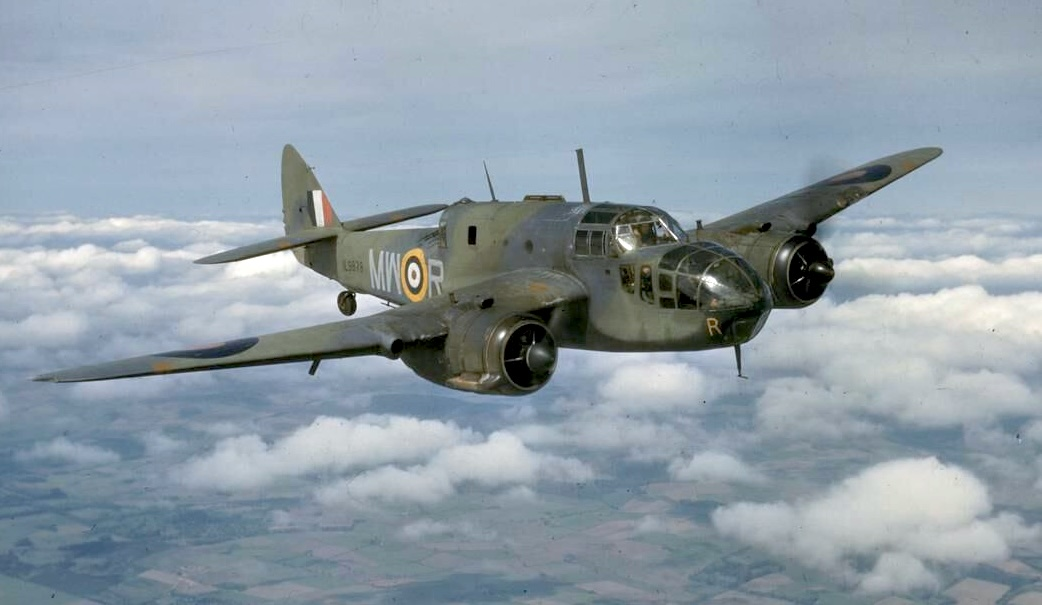
