= List of Copenhagen S-train lines =

S-train system map

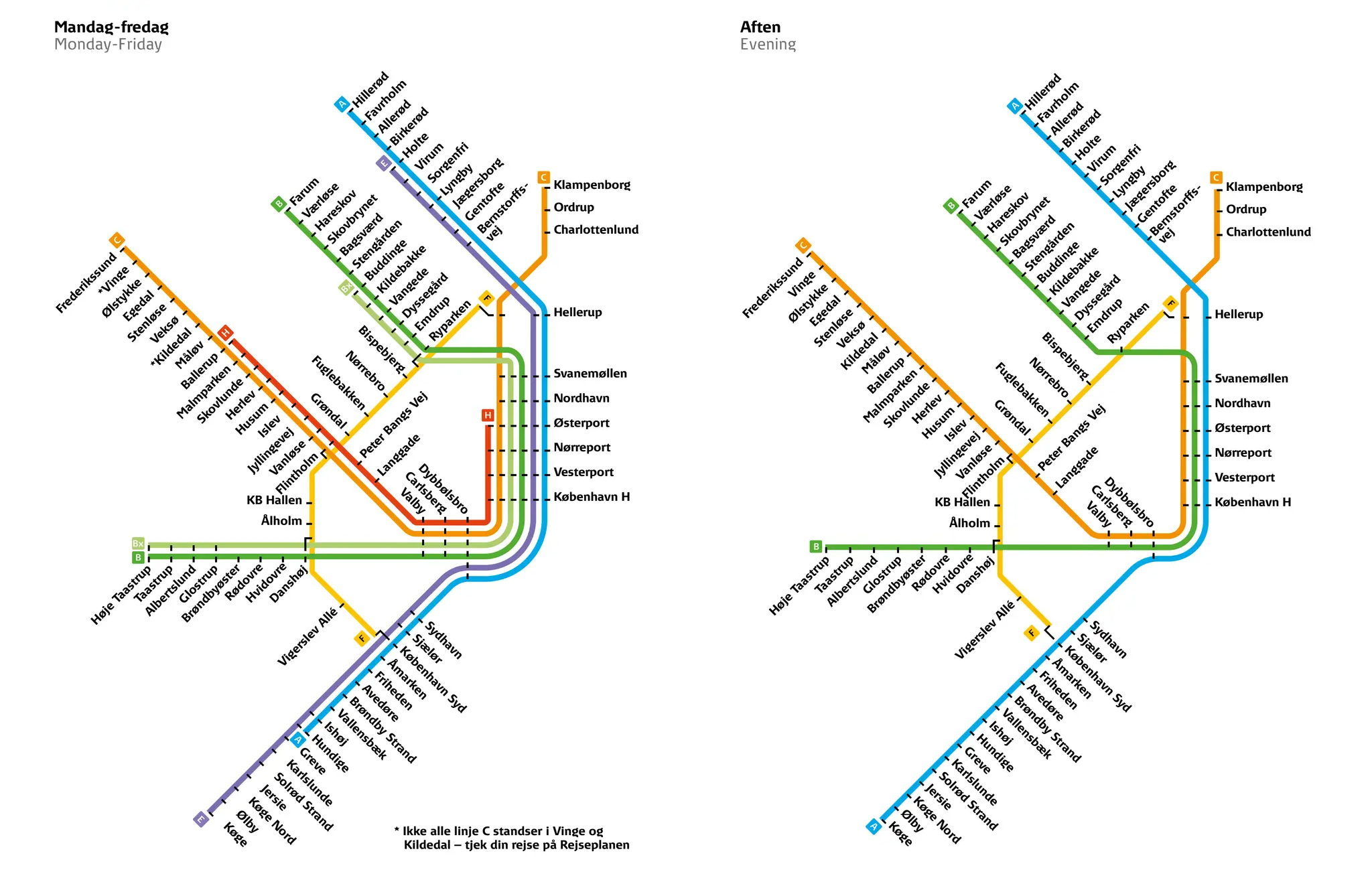
S-train system map

The lines used by the Copenhagen S-Train suburban rail system in Denmark are six radial, and two connecting rail lines built during the late 19th and early 20th centuries as commuter transport to and from the residential areas around the city centre.

== The radial lines ==
The lines are, anticlockwise from north to south:

1. The Klampenborgbanen, from Klampenborg in the north to Osterport station, where it connects to the Boulevard Line (the Roret (lit. the "tube") which runs under and through the city centre. It carries the C service to the north.
2. The Nordbanen, from Holte and Hillerød to Osterport, carrying the A and E services to the northwest.
3. The Hareskovbanen, from Farum to Osterport, carrying the B and H services northwest.
4. The Frederikssundbanen, from Frederikssund to Central station, where it connects to the Roret. It carries the C and H services to the west.
5. The Vestbanen, from Høje-Taastrup to Central, carrying the B and Bx services from the west.
6. The Køge Bugt-banen, from Hundige and Koge to Central, carrying the A and E services from the south.

== The connecting lines ==
The two connecting lines are:

- The Ringbanen, running from Hellerup in the north to Ny Ellebjerg in the south, and offering an interchange with the radial lines. It carries the F service
- The Boulevard Line (Roret) an underground connection between Østerport in the north to Central station in the south. It carries the A, B, Bx, C, E, and H services through the city centre.

== The Routes ==
Five suburban radials routes - A, B, Bx, C, E, H - become a cross city route at Valby and Dybbølsbro, going through the Boulevard Line, branching out after Svanemøllen and Hellerup with the exception of, with the F line running semicircularly around the central part of Copenhagen, linking Hellerup with Ny Ellebjerg. It is possible to make an approximately 20 km circular (or oval rather) lap inside the city centre and its innerboroughs, by changing line at Ryparken (or at Hellerup), in the north, and a second change at Ny Ellebjerg in the south. One such lap includes stops at 20 stations.

The radial sections are connected to the central section with three from the south and west (Køge Bugt line, Høje Taastrup line and Frederikssundsbanen), as well as three from north and northwest (Hareskovbanen, Nordbanen and Klampenborgbanen). The system is designed so that a train from a given southern section can continue along any of the three northern and vice versa. In addition, the ring line is connected to the Nordbanen and Klampenborgbanen in Hellerup, but it is normally only used in connection with the Klampenborgbanen.

== Timetable ==
The December 2014 timetable has seven lines, each with a letter designation. Most run from about 0500 to about 0100 each day, with a train every 10 minutes in daylight hours and one every 20 minutes in the early morning and evening/night. The 10-minute interval begins later and ends earlier on weekends. Exceptions are service F, which runs once every 5 minutes (every 10 minutes on weekends); H, every 20 minutes in daytime to Østerport; and Bx, as an extra line on the Vestbanen and Hareskovbanen in the morning and afternoon(rush hours).

E, H and Bx skipped certain stops to provide faster travel time, but no trains skip stops inside the ring line.

As of January 2019, the line layout was changed on the northern branches as follows:

- Line A serves Nordbanen to Hillerød, with limited stops.
- Line B serves Hareskovbanen to Farum
- Line Bx serves Hareskovbanen to Farum, with limited stops and only in the rush hours
- Line E serves Nordbanen, to Holte.

As of December 2020, the line layout was changed again on the northern branches as follows:

- Line Bx serves the southern part of Hareskovbanen to Buddinge.
- Line C serves Frederikssundbanen to Frederikssund, with limited stops in daytime and all stops at night and in the weekends.
- Line H serves the southern part of Frederikssundbanen to Ballerup, every twentieth minute in daytime with all stops.

On weekdays all stations are served at least every 10 minutes until the evening. There are six main lines and one peak hour support line. Since all lines, with exception of one, use the same path through the city core, train departures occur every second minute there, at the general limit of metro lines. On most suburban lines, trains depart every five minutes. On Sundays these time intervals are doubled.

The network is slightly different on weekdays, weekends and nights.

=== Weekday services ===
Name	Southern end		Runs when	Northern end	
A (S-train)	All stops to Hundige, every second train continues to Solrød Strand	Køgebugtbanen	Daytime	Nordbanen	Limited stops to Hillerød
A (S-train)	All stops to Køge	Køgebugtbanen	Evening	Nordbanen	Limited stops to Hillerød
B (S-train)	All stops to Høje Taastrup	Vestbanen	Daytime	Hareskovbanen	All stops to Farum
B (S-train)	All stops to Høje Taastrup	Vestbanen	Evening	Hareskovbanen	All stops to Farum
Bx (S-train)	Limited stops to Høje Taastrup	Vestbanen	Morning/Afternoon	Hareskovbanen	All stops to Buddinge
C (S-train)	Limited stops to Frederikssund	Frederikssundbanen	Daytime	Klampenborgbanen	All stops to Klampenborg
C (S-train)	All stops to Frederikssund	Frederikssundbanen	Evening	Klampenborgbanen	All stops to Klampenborg
E (S-train)	Limited stops to Hundige, then all stops to Køge	Køgebugtbanen	Daytime	Nordbanen	All stops to Holte
F (S-train)	All stops to Ny Ellebjerg	Ringbanen	All day	Ringbanen	All stops to Hellerup
H (S-train)	All stops to Ballerup	Frederikssundbanen	Daytime	-	Terminates at Østerport

Before 2007, each line would run on a strict 20-minute schedule. In periods where more than three trains an hour were needed, the extra trains had separate service designations; for example service B+ ran on the same route as B, but only in the daytime and with its departure times offset 10 minutes from B.

Earlier timetables also had express services that skipped stops inside the ring line.

=== Weekend services ===
In the weekends, only lines A, B, C and F run, operating six times an hour between 1000 and 1800 and every 20 minutes outside this timespan. The weekend services are:

Name	Southern end		Northern end	
A (S-train)	All stops to Køge	Køgebugtbanen	Nordbanen	All stops to Hillerød
B (S-train)	All stops to Høje Taastrup	Vestbanen	Hareskovbanen	All stops to Farum
C (S-train)	All stops to Frederikssund	Frederikssundbanen	Klampenborgbanen	All stops to Klampenborg
F (S-train)	All stops to Ny Ellebjerg	Ringbanen	Ringbanen	All stops to Hellerup

=== Night services ===
Starting November 2009, the network has had distinct night services that depart twice every hour on Friday and Saturday night. The night services are:

Name	Southern end		Runs when	Northern end	
A (S-train)	All stops to Køge	Køgebugtbanen	Twice every hour	Nordbanen	All stops to Hillerød
B (S-train)	All stops to Høje Taastrup	Vestbanen	Twice every hour	Hareskovbanen	All stops to Farum
C (S-train)	All stops to Frederikssund	Frederikssundbanen	Twice every hour	-	Terminates at Copenhagen Central Station
F (S-train)	All stops to Ny Ellebjerg	Ringbanen	Twice every hour	Klampenborgbanen	All stops to Klampenborg

There is one service for each of the radials at night, stopping at every station.
