= Avedøre =

Town in Denmark

Coordinates: 55°37′N 12°27′E

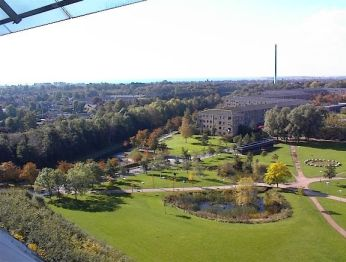
View of Avedøre from Store Hus.

Avedøre is a south-western suburb of Copenhagen located in Hvidovre Municipality.

== Description ==
The city is mostly made up of concrete blocks and row-housing, but some people residing in Avedøre live in detached single-family houses with gardens. One major high-rise block called "Store Hus" (lit. English: Grand House) dominates the suburb's skyline. The city has a relatively high rate of crime and many inhabitants are unemployed. Approximately 16,000 persons live in Avedøre, and approx. 60% of the inhabitants is either immigrant or born by immigrants, mainly from Iraq, Palestine, Lebanon, Spain and Turkey.

== History ==
Prior to 1 April 1974, Avedøre was an exclave of Glostrup Municipality. On that date, Avedøre was combined with neighboring Hvidovre Municipality.

== Transport ==
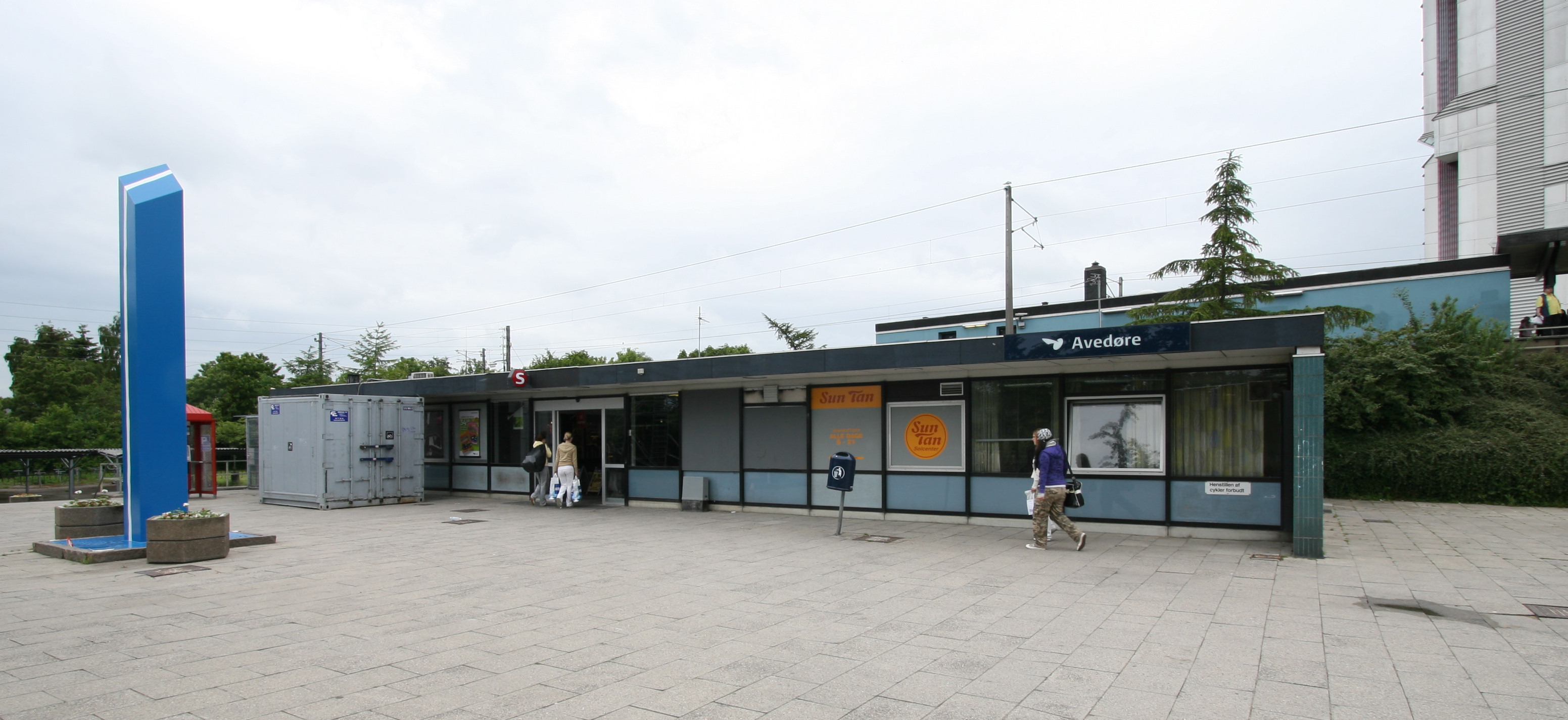
Avedøre railway station

Avedøre is served by Avedøre railway station, located on the Køge radial of Copenhagen's S-train network. The station is served regularly by trains on the A-line which have a journey time to central Copenhagen of around 15 minutes.

== Notable people ==
- Majid (born 1975) a Danish rapper of Moroccan-Berber origin, from Brøndby Strand, lives in Avedøre
