= Friheden railway station =

Commuter railway station in Greater Copenhagen, Denmark

Friheden
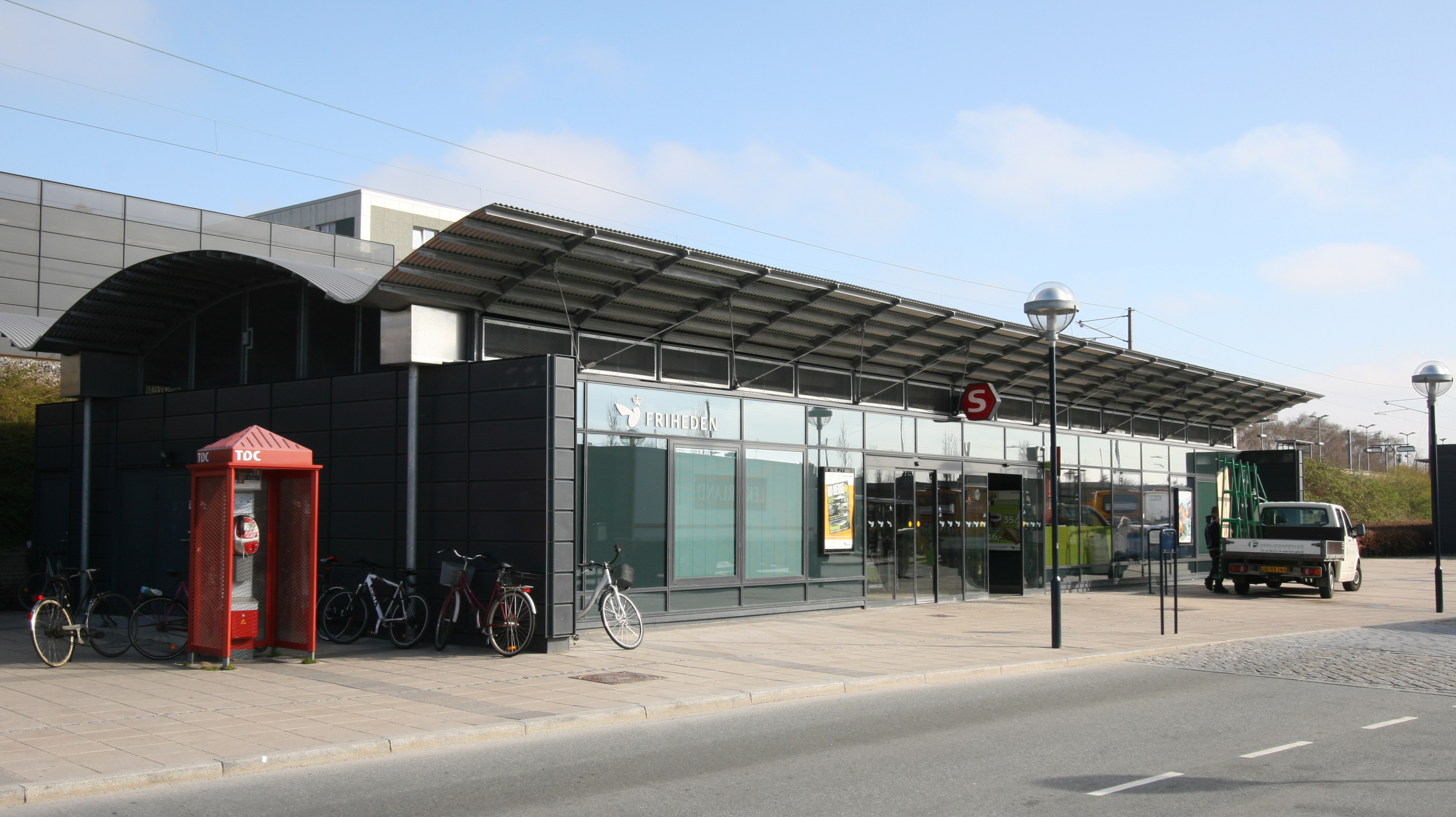
- Friheden station in 2007

General information
- Location: Hvidovrevej 333-335; 2650 Hvidovre; Hvidovre Municipality; Denmark
- Coordinates: 55°37′45″N 12°28′58″E
- Elevation: 6.4 metres (21 ft)
- Owner: DSB (station infrastructure); Banedanmark (rail infrastructure)
- Platforms: Island platform
- Tracks: 2
- Train operators: DSB
- Connections: Bus terminal

History
- Opened: 1972

Services
Preceding station	S-train	Following station
Åmarken towards Hillerød	A	Avedøre towards Hundige
Åmarken towards Hillerød	A Sat–Sun	Avedøre towards Køge
Location

Friheden station is a suburban rail railway station serving Friheden, the southern part of the suburb of Hvidovre west of Copenhagen, Denmark. The station is located on the Køge radial of Copenhagen's S-train network.

== History ==
The station opened on 1 October 1972 as the first section of the Køge Bay Line from Copenhagen to Vallensbæk was completed.

== Cultural references ==
The long-running Danish rock band Malurt included a song titled Friheden Station on their 1980 debut album Kold Krig.

Friheden station is used as a location in the 2004 Danish Dogme 95 feature film In Your Hands.

== See also ==
- List of Copenhagen S-train stations
- List of railway stations in Denmark
