= Avedøre railway station =

Commuter railway station in Greater Copenhagen, Denmark

Avedøre
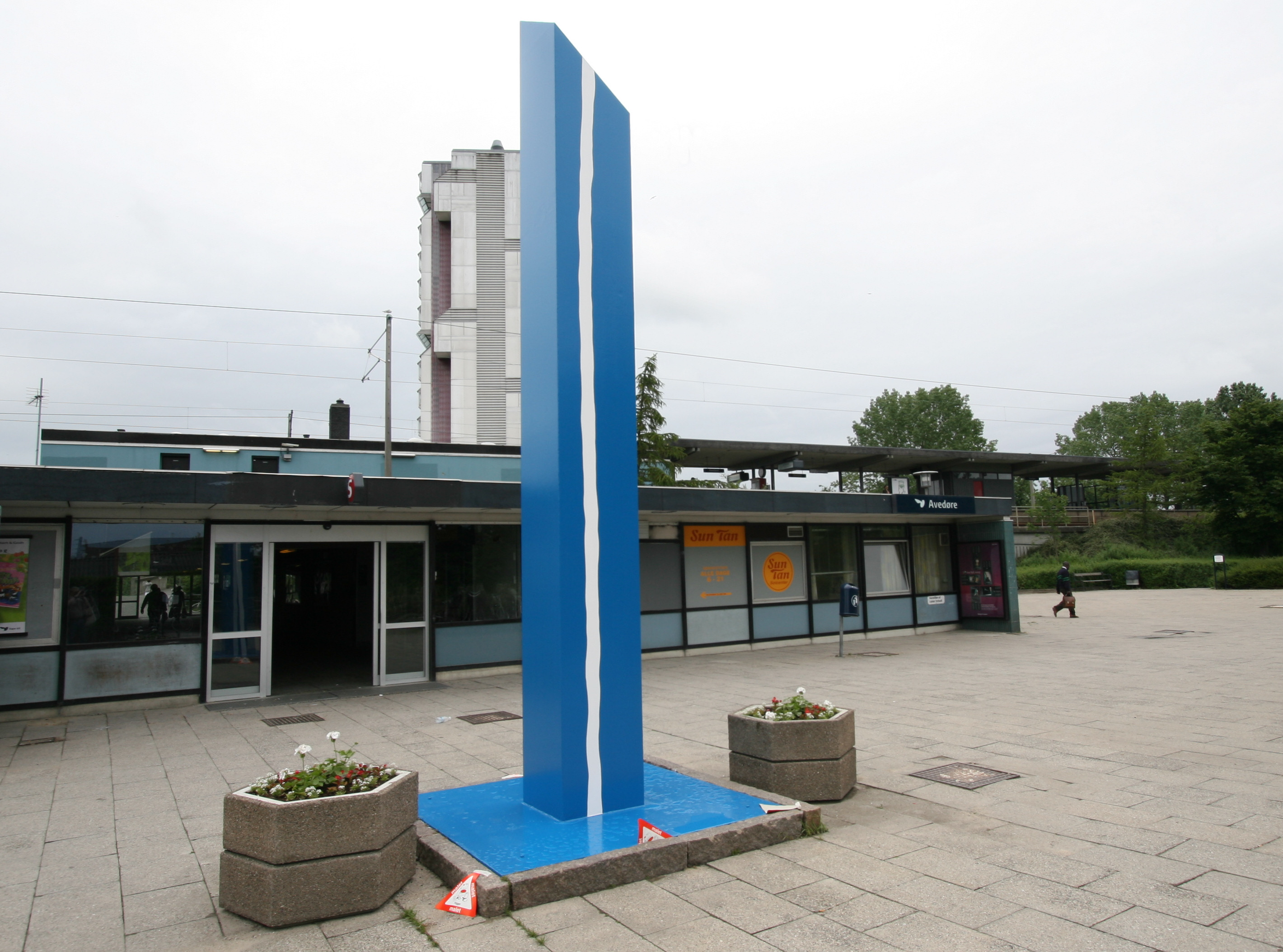
- Avedøre station in 2007

General information
- Location: 52 Kærgårdsvej; 2650 Hvidovre; Hvidovre Municipality; Denmark
- Coordinates: 55°37′32″N 12°27′18″E
- Elevation: 5.0 metres (16.4 ft)
- Owner: DSB (station infrastructure); Banedanmark (rail infrastructure)
- Line: Køge Bay Line
- Platforms: 1 island platform
- Tracks: 2
- Train operators: DSB
- Connections: Bus

Other information
- Station code: Avø
- Website: Official website

History
- Opened: 1 October 1972

Services
Preceding station	S-train	Following station
Friheden towards Hillerød	A	Brøndby Strand towards Hundige
Friheden towards Hillerød	A Sat–Sun	Brøndby Strand towards Køge
Location

Avedøre station is a suburban rail railway station serving the suburb of Avedøre southwest of Copenhagen, Denmark.

Avedøre station is located on the Køge radial of Copenhagen's S-train network, a hybrid suburban rail and rapid transit system serving Greater Copenhagen. The station is served regularly by trains on the A-line which have a journey time to central Copenhagen of around 15 minutes.

== History ==
The station opened on 1 October 1972 as the first section of the Køge Bay Line from Copenhagen to Vallensbæk was completed.

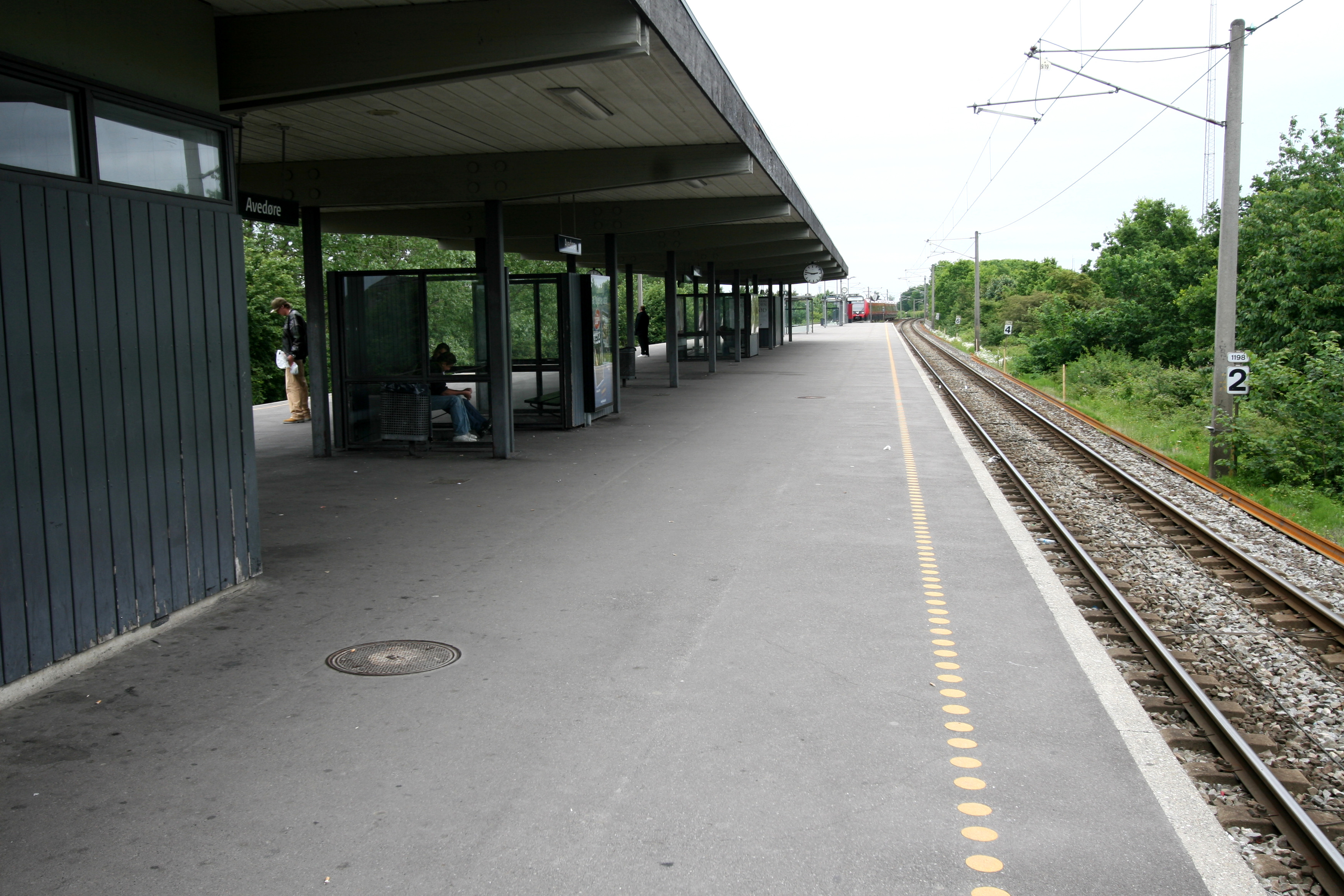
Station platform

== See also ==
- List of Copenhagen S-train stations
- List of railway stations in Denmark
- Rail transport in Denmark
- Transport in Copenhagen
- Transport in Denmark
