= Brøndby Strand railway station =

Commuter railway station in Greater Copenhagen, Denmark

Brøndby Strand
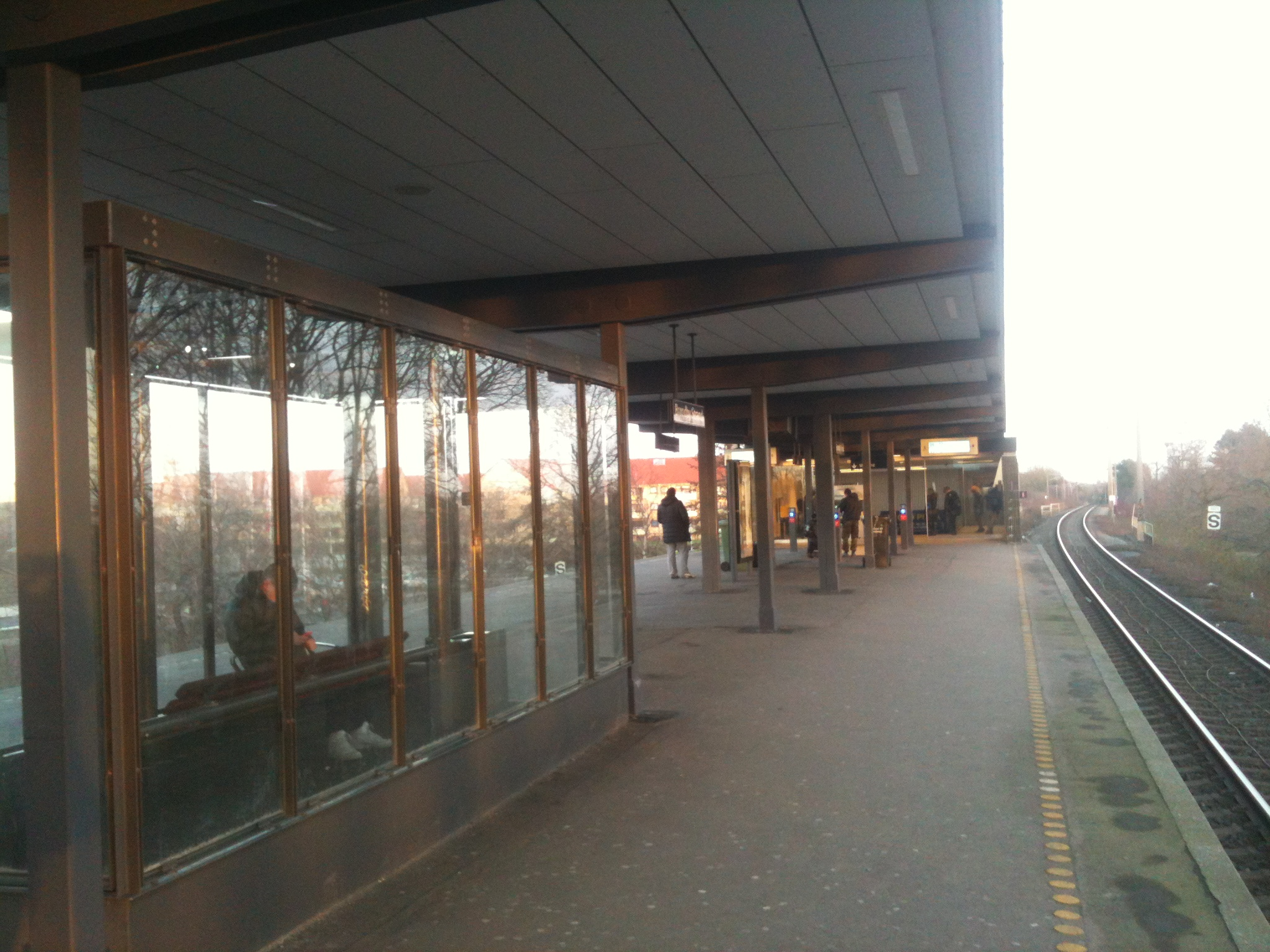
- Brøndby Strand station in 2016

General information
- Location: Brøndby Strand Centrum 1; 2660 Brøndby Strand; Brøndby Municipality; Denmark
- Coordinates: 55.621°N 12.422°E
- Elevation: 3.2 metres (10 ft)
- Owner: DSB (station infrastructure); Banedanmark (rail infrastructure)
- Line: Køge Bay Line
- Platforms: Island platform
- Tracks: 2
- Train operators: DSB

Other information
- Website: Official website

Services
Preceding station	S-train	Following station
Avedøre towards Hillerød	A	Vallensbæk towards Hundige
Avedøre towards Hillerød	A Sat–Sun	Vallensbæk towards Køge
Location

Brøndby Strand (Danish pronunciation: [ˈpʁɶnpy ˈstʁɑnˀ]) is a suburban rail railway station serving the suburb of Brøndby Strand west of Copenhagen, Denmark. It is located on the Køge radial of Copenhagen's S-train network. It serves the southern end of Brøndby Municipality.

== History ==
The station opened on 1 October 1972 as the first section of the Køge Bay Line from Copenhagen to Vallensbæk was completed.

== See also ==
- List of Copenhagen S-train stations
- List of railway stations in Denmark
