= Greve railway station =

Commuter railway station in Greater Copenhagen, Denmark

Greve
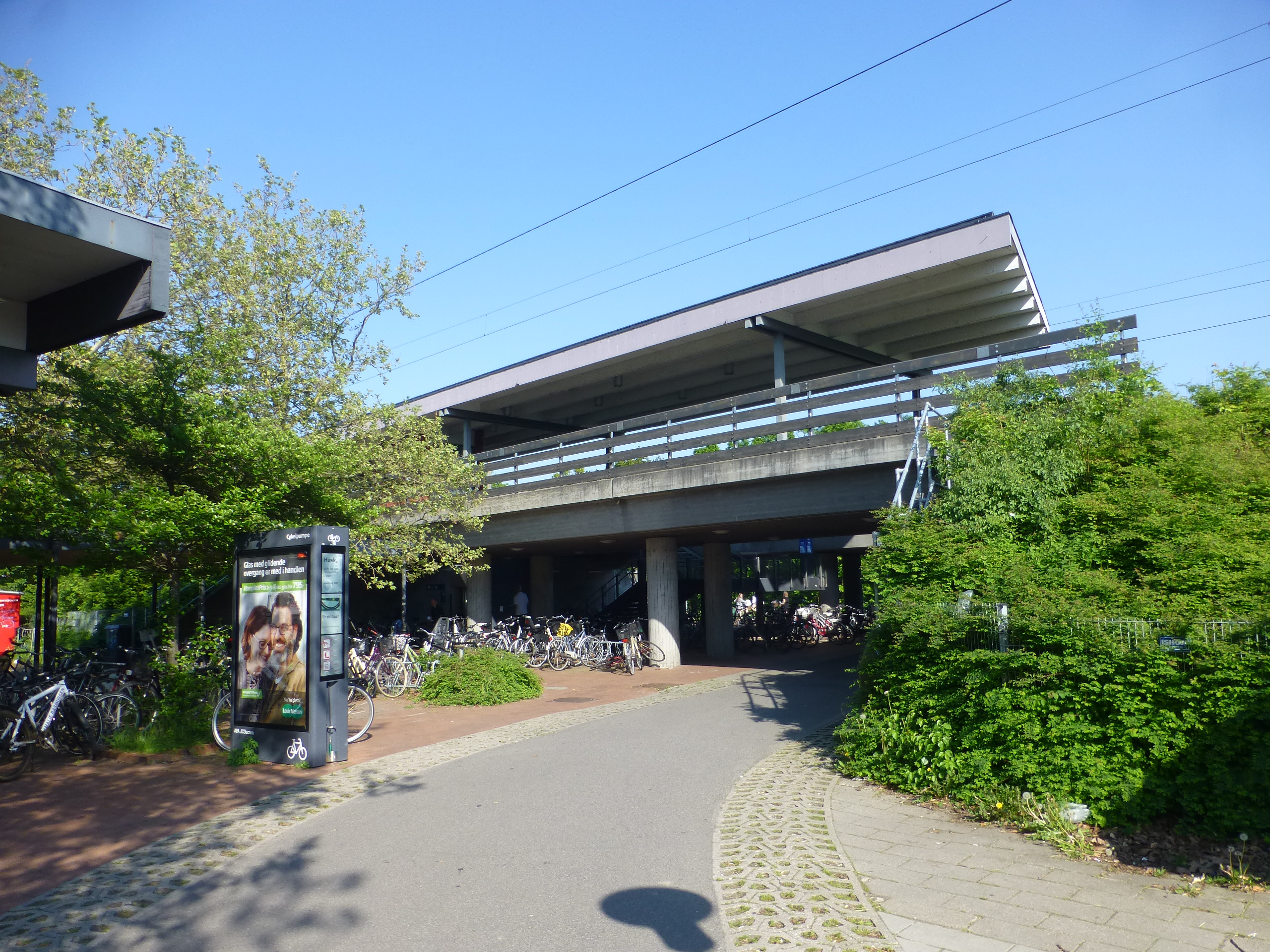
- Greve station in 2014

General information
- Location: Stationsholmen 6; 2670 Greve Strand; Greve Municipality; Denmark
- Coordinates: 55°34′54″N 12°17′48″E
- Elevation: 7.0 metres (23.0 ft)
- Owner: DSB (station infrastructure); Banedanmark (rail infrastructure)
- Platforms: 1 island platform
- Tracks: 2
- Train operators: DSB

Construction
- Parking: 389 spaces
- Cycle facilities: Yes

Other information
- Station code: Gre
- Fare zone: 67
- Website: Official website

History
- Opened: September 30, 1979
- Closed: Never
- Former names: DSB

Services
Preceding station	S-train	Following station
Hundige towards Holte	E Mon–Fri	Karlslunde towards Køge
Hundige towards Hillerød	A Sat–Sun	Karlslunde towards Køge
Location

Greve station is a suburban rail railway station on the Køge radial of the S-train network in Copenhagen, Denmark. It is the middle of three stations in the urbanized coastal end of Greve municipality, and serves the mainly residential areas Greve and Mosede.

In this area, the twin railroad sits on a ridge raised above the surrounding terrain. Greve station has a single platform between the two tracks, running in a south-western to north-eastern direction. The platform can be accessed via staircases at both ends, but facilities such as the elevator, automatic ticket machines, the adjacent convenience store and bus stops are "concentrated" at the south-western end. Likewise, the "short" S-Trains (4 carriages rather than 8, used outside rush hours) also stop at this end of the platform.

In 2016 a construction project began at Greve station aimed at creating more open space and more bicycle stands. In the municipality of Greve, the station is a central point in the city and they want it to be a nice area to get into when walking out of the train. New, and more, lights are coming to the "plaza" of the station area. New coating to the ground is getting laid out and more green space is coming. The project is expected to be finished in November or December 2017.

The project is a 15 million Danish kroner project, where the municipality of Greve is paying the half.

== See also ==
- List of Copenhagen S-train stations
- List of railway stations in Denmark
