= Køge Bugt-banen =

Railway line in Greater Copenhagen, Denmark

Køge Bay Line

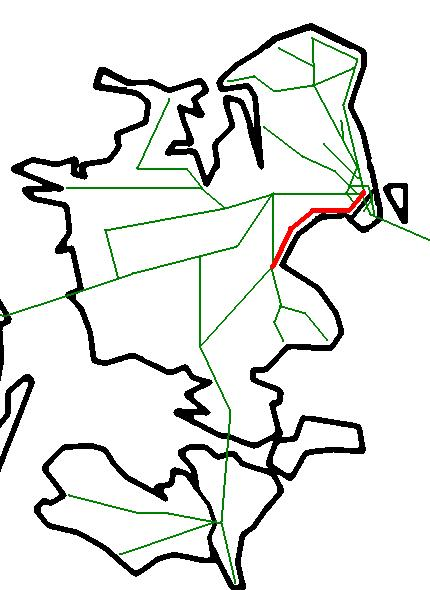

Overview
- Native name: Køge Bugt-banen
- Owner: Banedanmark
- Line number: 850
- Locale: Greater Copenhagen
- Termini: Copenhagen Central Station; Køge
- Stations: 19
- Website: https://bane.dk

Service
- Type: Suburban rail
- System: Copenhagen S-train
- Operator(s): DSB
- Rolling stock: 4th generation S-train

Technical
- Line length: 5.5 km (3.4 mi)
- Number of tracks: 2
- Character: Grade-separated
- Track gauge: 1,435 mm (4 ft 8 1/2 in) standard gauge
- Electrification: 1,650 V DC overhead line
- Signalling: CBTC
Route map
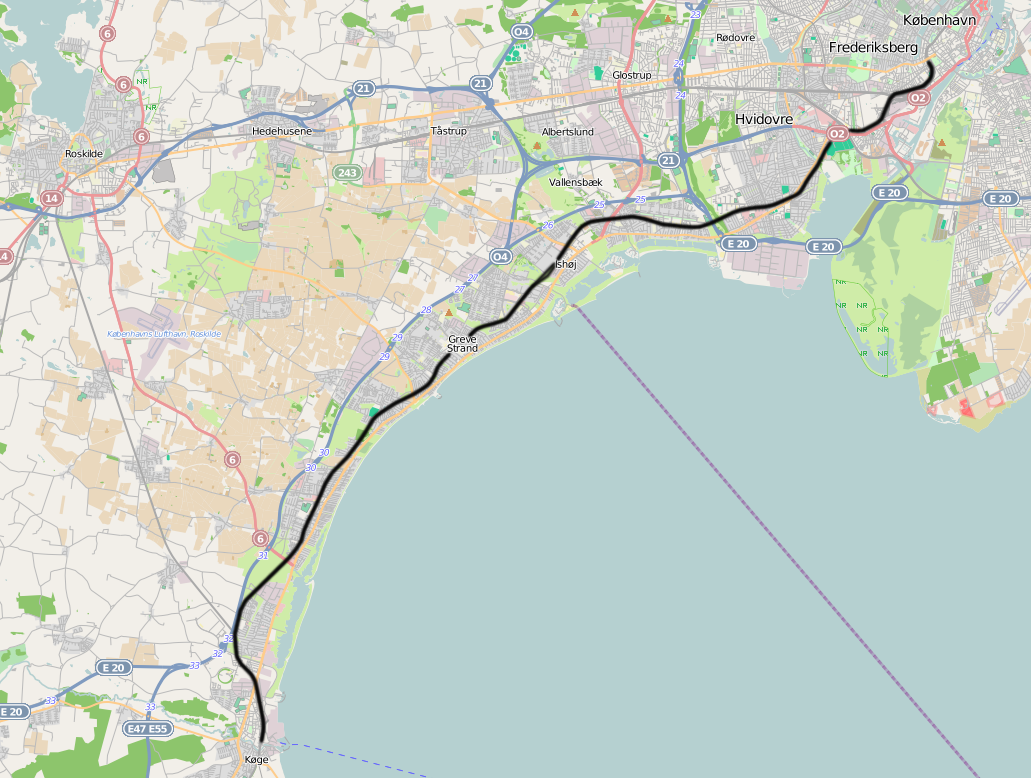
Map of the Copenhagen-Køge railway line

Køge Bugt-banen is one of six radial S-train lines in Copenhagen; it connects the city center to communities along Køge Bugt (the bay of Køge) and terminates in the city of Køge about 35 km southwest of central Copenhagen.

== History ==
Køge Bugt-banen is the only one of the six S-train radials that was originally built as an S-train line. It opened in four phases between 1972 and 1983. It was originally envisaged that its main role would be as a "picnic railway" providing access for city-dwellers to the beaches between Brøndby Strand and Hundige, but after the first phase was completed it became evident that transporting commuters were more important. Therefore, the station at Hundige was placed about 500 m farther inland than planned at first. Around 1960 the area was sparsely populated, but there were large housing projects in the 1960s–1970s. City suburbs need transportation, which is the background of the railway project. The abandoned area reservations from Ishøj until Olsbækken in Greve can still be followed on a modern map.

The railway was completed when it reached Køge in 1983. Until then the only rail connection between Copenhagen and Køge was a long detour via Roskilde.

A new high-speed railway, Copenhagen–Ringsted Line, has been built parallel with Køgebugtbanen continuing to Ringsted, opened for traffic in 2019. This line has a stop at a new station, also with a stop along Køge Bugt-banen, located between Ølby and Jersie Station, which serves as an exchange point between the new line and Køge Bugt-banen. The new station is called Køge Nord Station (Køge North).

== Stations ==
Name	Services	Opened	S-trains	Comments
Østerport	A, E	2 August 1897	15 May 1934	Also all other radials; named Østerbro until 1934
Nørreport	A, E	1 July 1918	15 May 1934	Also all other radials; transfer to metro; bus terminal; cross-link express buses 150S and 350S
Vesterport	A, E	15 May 1934		Also all other radials
København H	A, E	30 November 1911	15 May 1934	Central station; also all other radials; cross-link express bus 250S
Dybbølsbro	A, E	1 November 1934		Also Tåstrup and Frederikssund radials
Sydhavn	A, E	1 October 1972		
Sjælør	A, E	1 October 1972		
Ny Ellebjerg	A, E	6 January 2007		Transfer to ring line
Ellebjerg	—	1 October 1972		Closed since 6 January 2007
Åmarken	A	1 October 1972		
Friheden	A, E	1 October 1972		Cross-link express bus 200S
Avedøre	A	1 October 1972		
Brøndby Strand	A	1 October 1972		Cross-link express bus 500S
Vallensbæk	A	1 October 1972		Cross-link express bus 300S
Ishøj	A, E	26 September 1976		Cross-link express buses 300S, 400S
Hundige	A, E	26 September 1976		A service terminates; bus terminal; cross-link express buses 400S, 600S
Greve	(A), E	30 September 1979		Cross-link express bus 600S
Karlslunde	(A), E	30 September 1979		
Solrød Strand	(A), E	30 September 1979		Extended A service terminates
Jersie	E	25 September 1983		
Køge Nord	E	1 June 2019		
Ølby	E	25 September 1983		Transfer to regional train (Lille Syd), Østbanen
Køge	E	4 October 1870	25 September 1983	Transfer to regional train (Lille Syd), Østbanen, many buses

== Service patterns ==
The basic service pattern consists of the A service which runs until Hundige and stops at all stations, and E, which runs partially non-stop until Ishøj and then stops at all stations until Køge.

== See also ==
- List of Copenhagen S-train lines
- Transportation in Copenhagen
- List of railway lines in Denmark
- Rail transport in Denmark
- Transportation in Denmark
- History of rail transport in Denmark
- S-train (Copenhagen)
- Banedanmark
