= Ishøj railway station =

Commuter railway station in Greater Copenhagen, Denmark

Ishøj
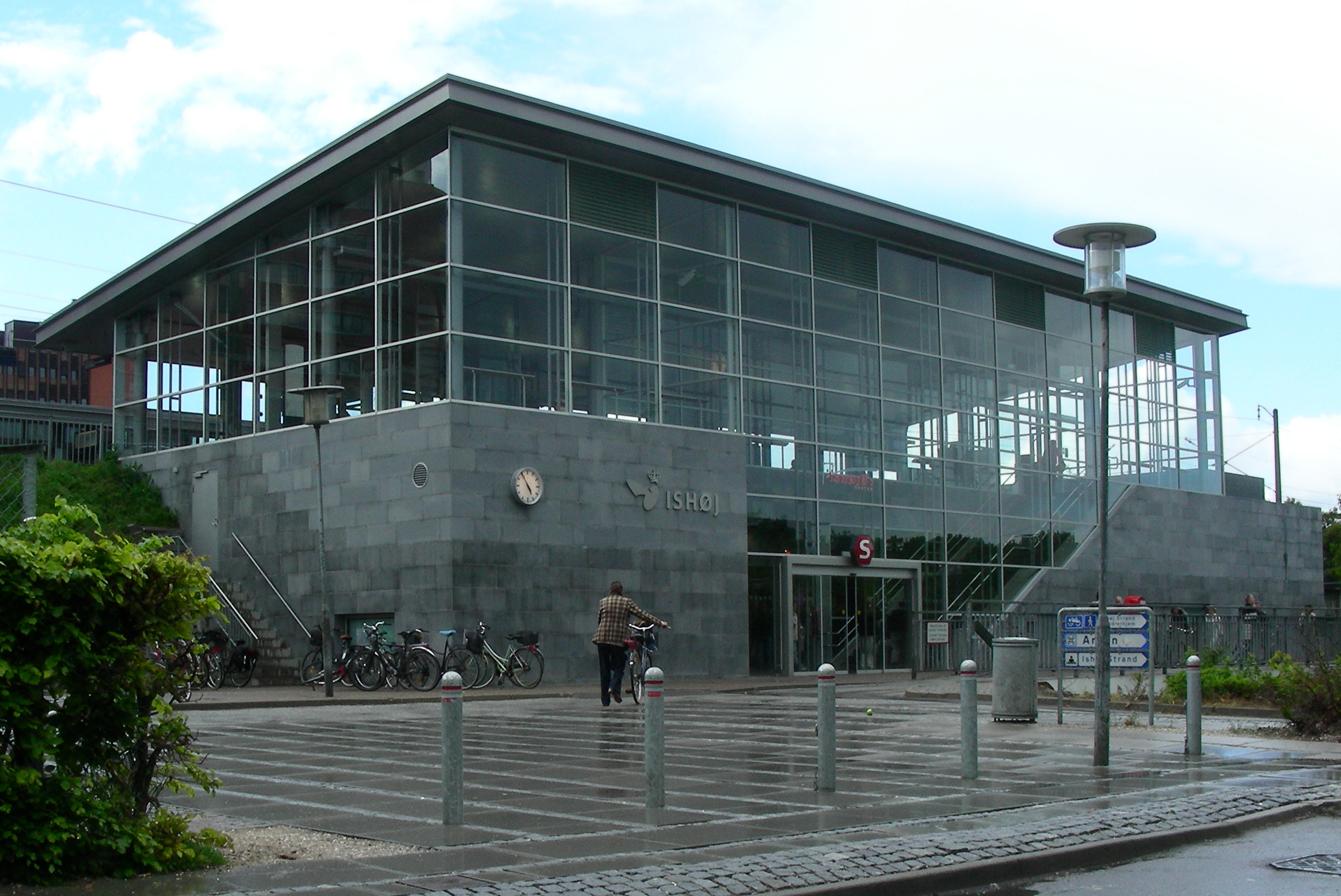
- Ishøj station in 2006

General information
- Location: Vejlebrovej 35; 2635 Ishøj; Ishøj Municipality; Denmark
- Coordinates: 55°36′48″N 12°21′28″E
- Elevation: 4.9 metres (16 ft)
- Owner: DSB (station infrastructure); Banedanmark (rail infrastructure)
- Platforms: 2 side platforms
- Tracks: 2
- Train operators: DSB

History
- Opened: 1976

Services
Preceding station	S-train	Following station
Vallensbæk towards Hillerød	A	Hundige Terminus
Vallensbæk towards Holte	E Mon–Fri	Hundige towards Køge
Vallensbæk towards Hillerød	A Sat–Sun	Hundige towards Køge
Preceding station	Hovedstadens Letbane	Following station
Terminus	Greater Copenhagen Light Rail	Ishøj Strand Arken towards Rødovre Nord
Location

Ishøj station is a suburban and light railway station serving the suburb of Ishøj southwest of Copenhagen, Denmark. The station serves the urbanized coastal end of Ishøj Municipality and is situated in the central part of the suburb where it is integrated in the adjacent shopping centre, Ishøj Bymidte.

Ishøj station is located on the Køge radial of Copenhagen's S-train network, a hybrid suburban rail and rapid transit system serving Greater Copenhagen. The Greater Copenhagen Light Rail has its southern terminus at Ishøj station.

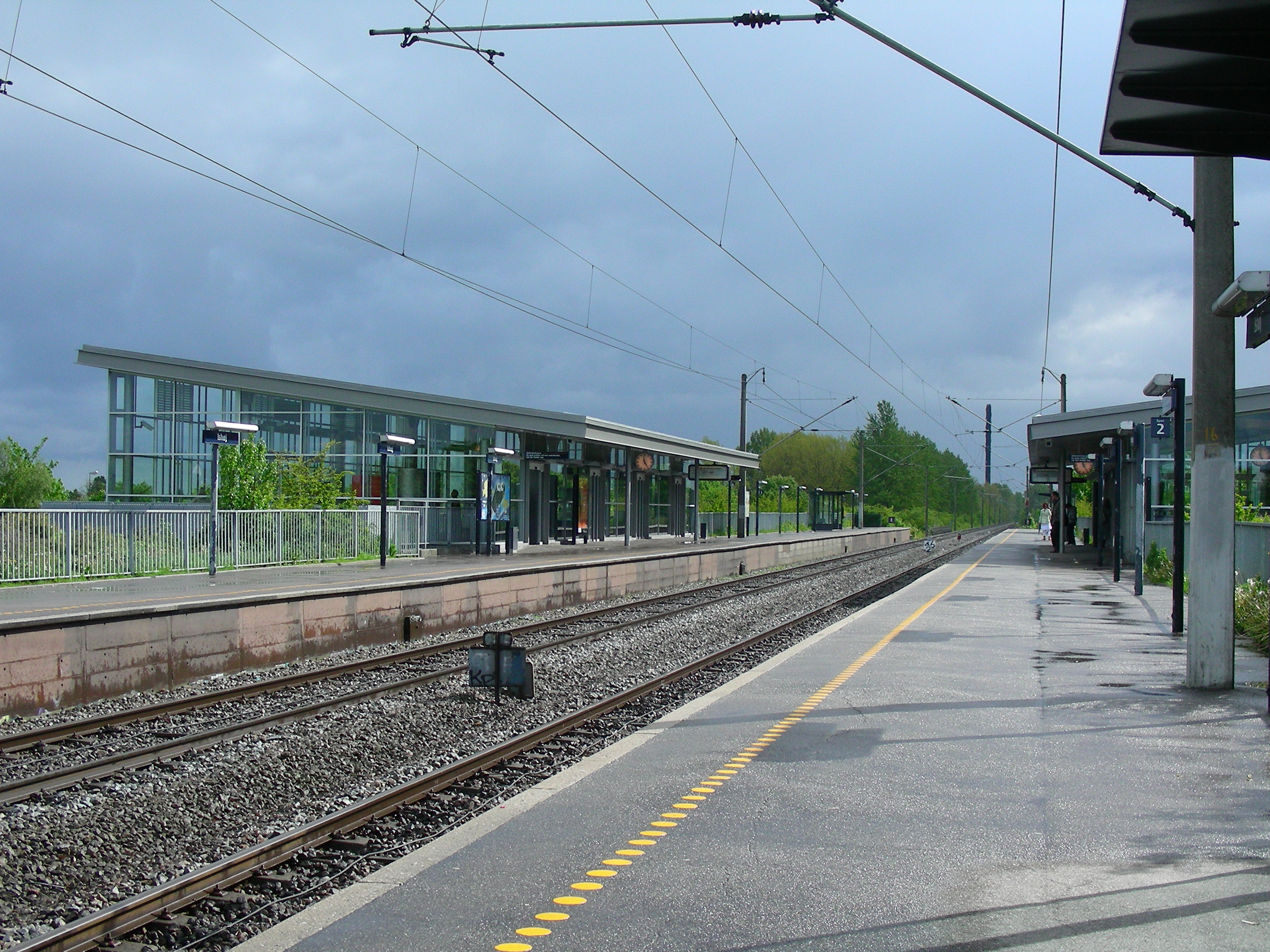
Platforms aligned either side of the two tracks

== History ==
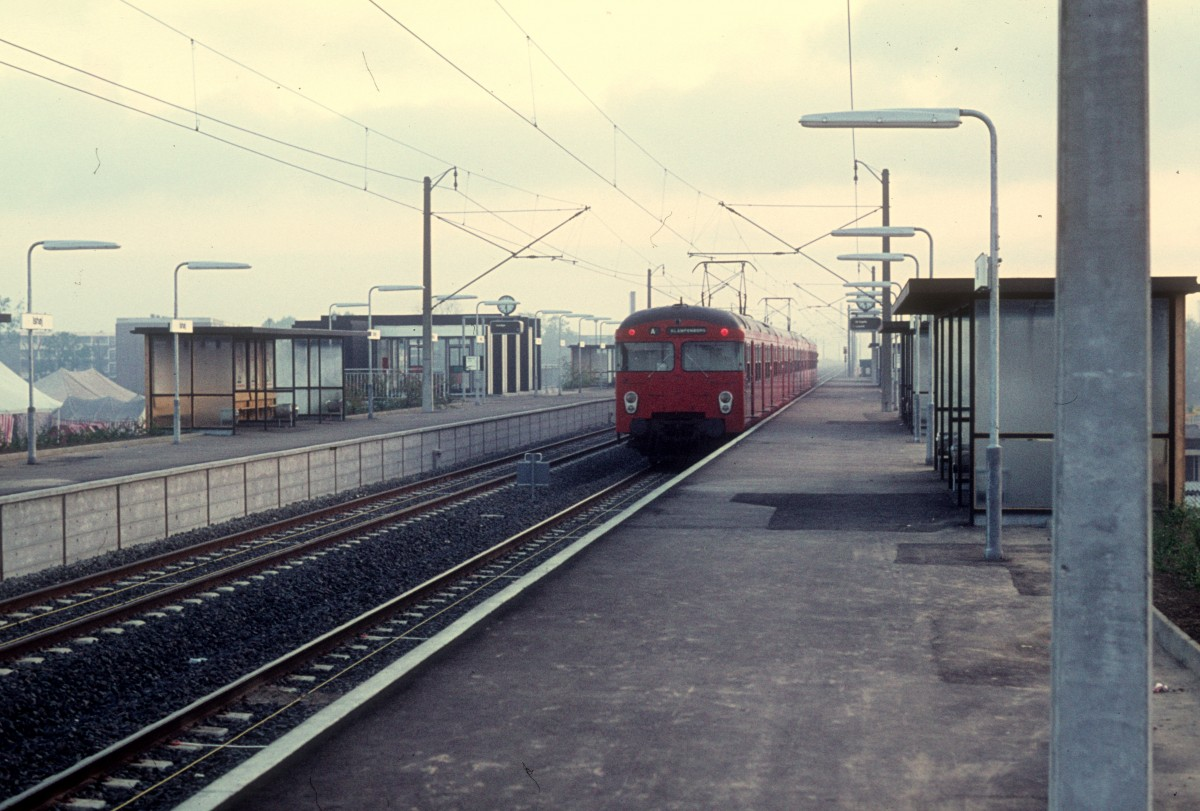
2nd generation S-train at Ishøj station in 1976.

Ishøj station opened on 26 September 1976 as the second section of the Køge Bay Line from Vallensbæk to Hundige was completed.

The station underwent a major renovation and modernization in 2005 to improve the facilities and integrate it with the adjacent shopping centre, Ishøj Bymidte.

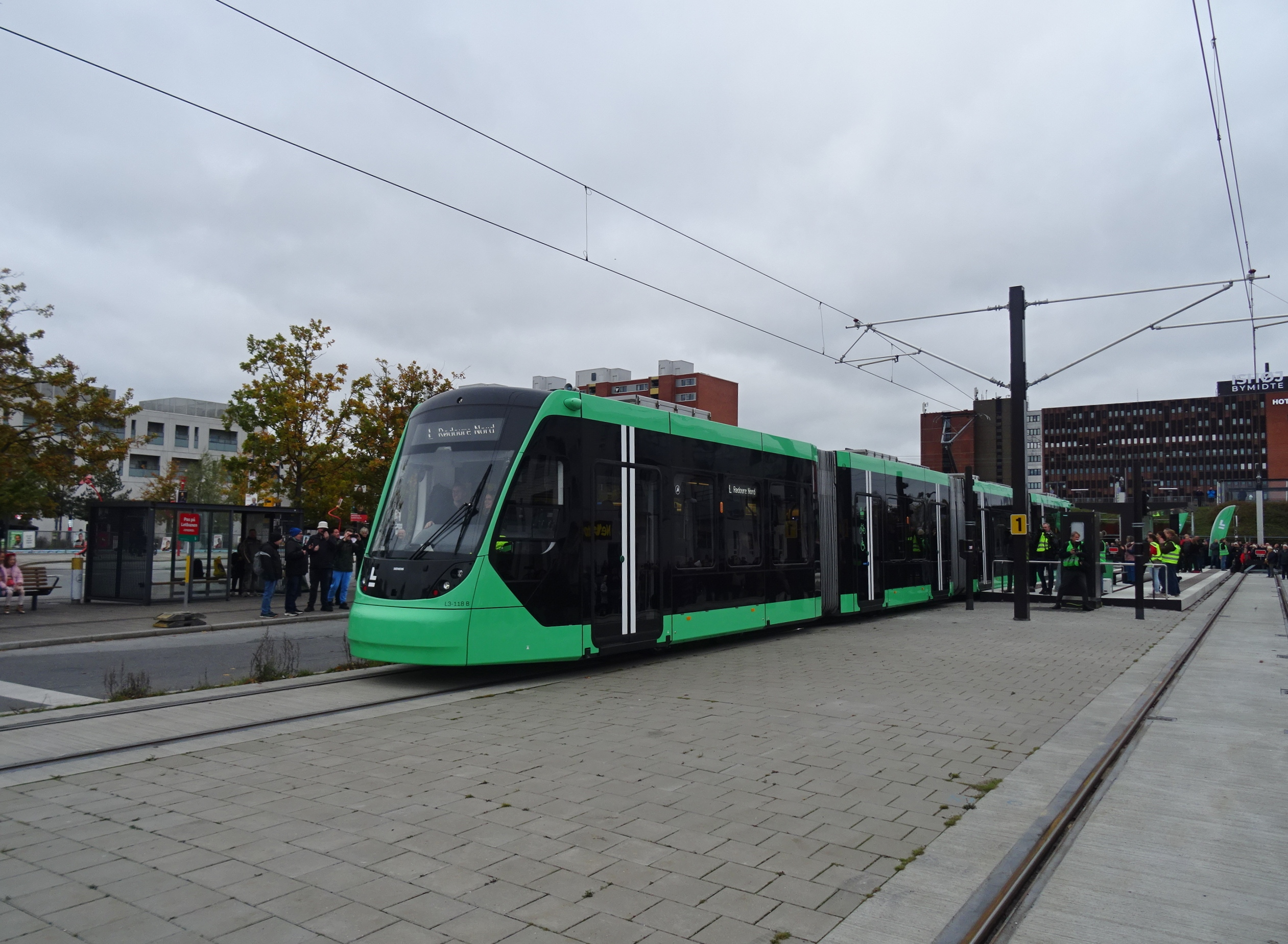
The departure of the first tram of the Greater Copenhagen Light Rail from Ishøj Station on 6 October 2025.

Since 6 October 2025, the Greater Copenhagen Light Rail has its southern terminus at Ishøj station.

== See also ==
- List of Greater Copenhagen Light Rail stations
- List of Copenhagen S-train stations
- List of railway stations in Denmark
