= Greater Copenhagen Light Rail =

Light rail in Greater Copenhagen

Hovedstadens Letbane

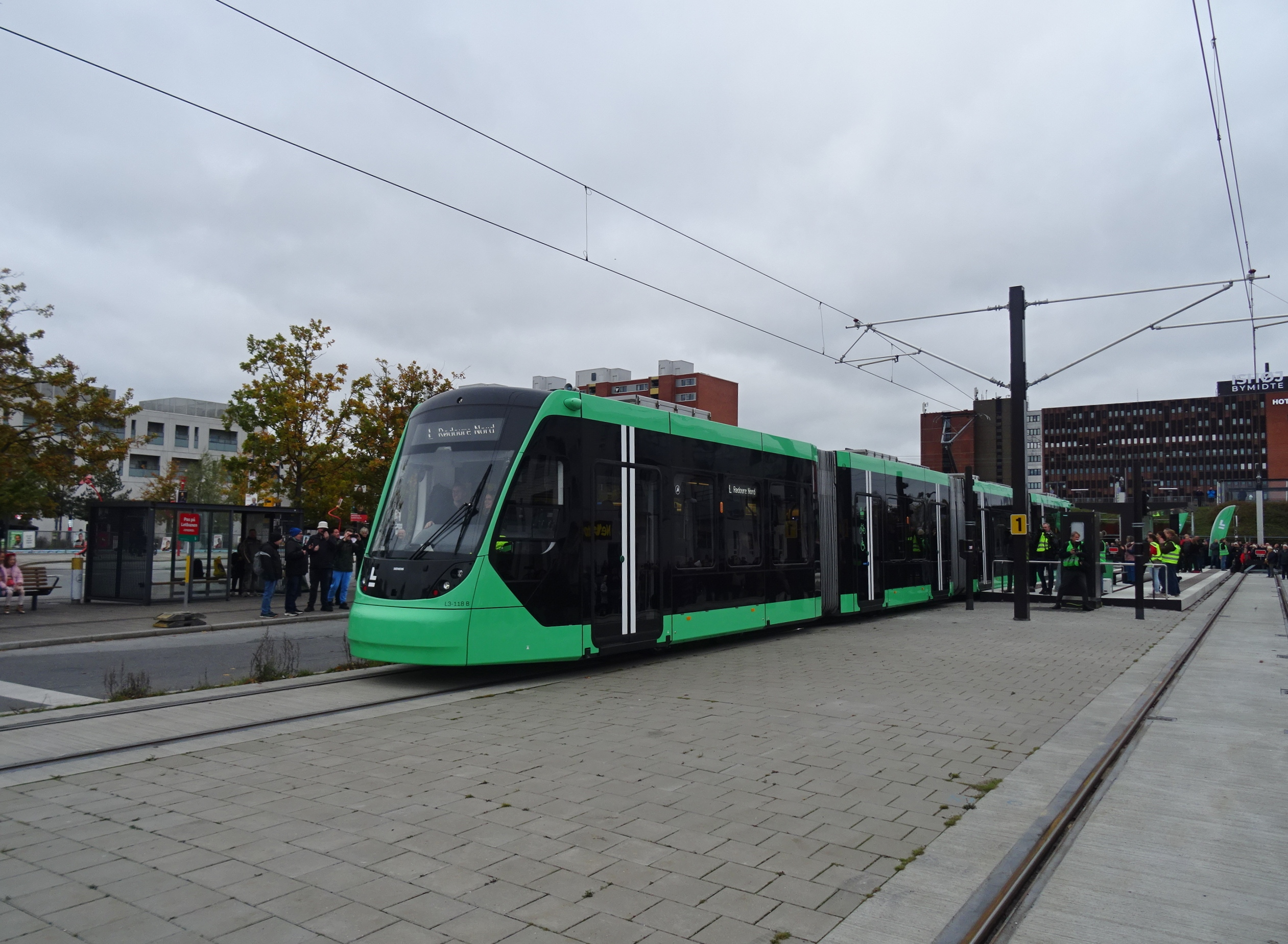
- Tram at Ishøj Station on opening day

Overview
- Owner: Ringby-Letbanesamarbejdet
- Locale: Metropolitan Copenhagen
- Transit type: Light rail
- Number of lines: 1
- Number of stations: 29
- Website: www.dinletbane.dk

Operation
- Began operation: 26 October 2025 (southern section) 22 August 2026 (northern section)
- Operators: Metro Service (owned by Azienda Trasporti Milanesi)
- Train length: 4 cars - 36.9 m (121 ft 3/4 in)

Technical
- System length: 28 km (17 mi)
- Track gauge: 1,435 mm (4 ft 8 1/2 in) standard gauge
- Electrification: 750 V DC Overhead lines
- Average speed: 30 km/h (19 mph)
- Top speed: 70 km/h (43 mph)
Map of the route
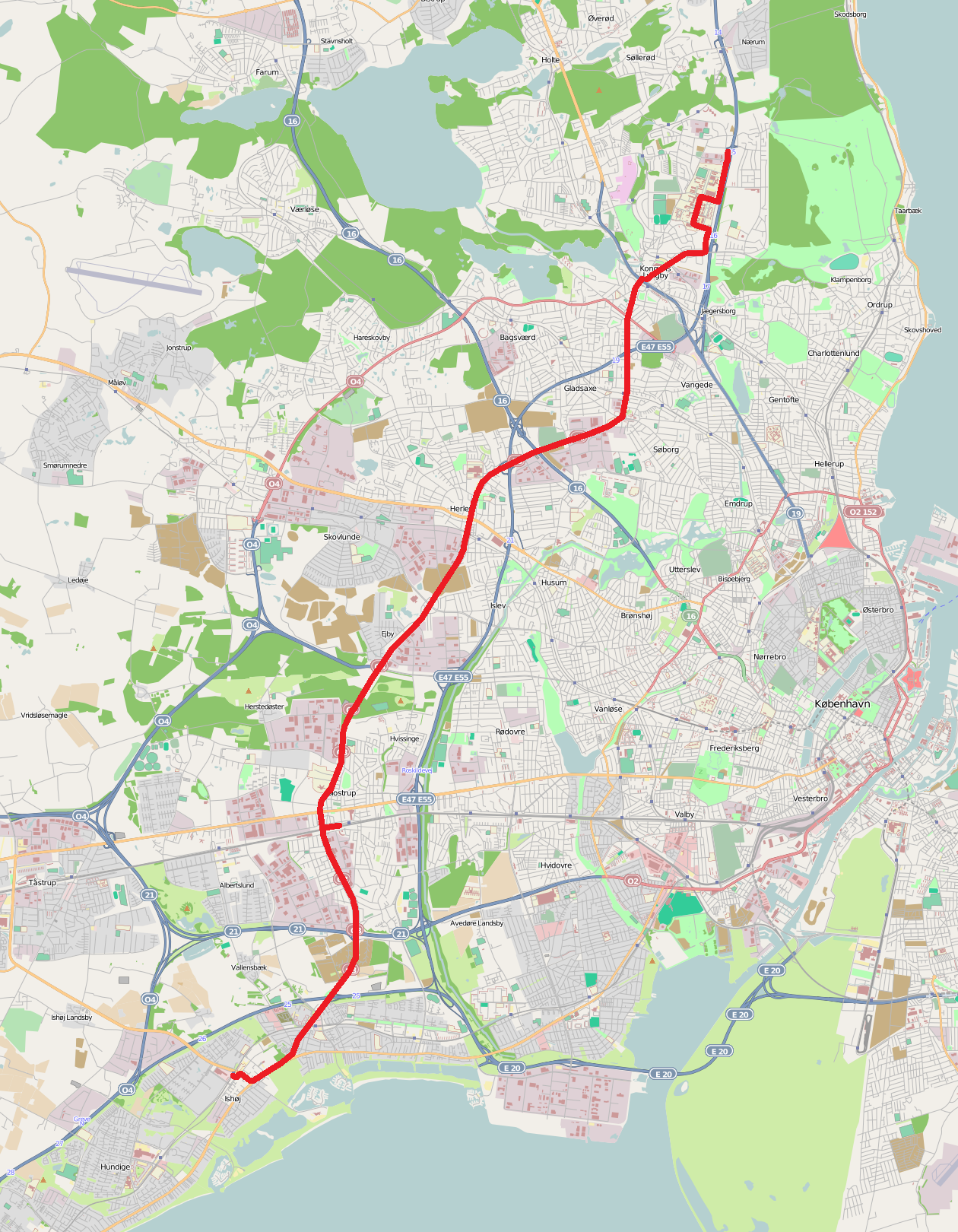

Greater Copenhagen Light Rail (Danish: Hovedstadens Letbane, lit. 'The Capital City's Light Rail') is a light rail system which connects with six S-train lines in Greater Copenhagen, Denmark, parallel to but outside the borders of Copenhagen Municipality. Its first stage is known as the Ring 3 Light Rail, which was finished in 2026, having been under construction since 2018. It runs from Lundtofte, north of Copenhagen to Ishøj station in the southwest, with a projected annual ridership of 13-14 million.

The line is owned by the Ringby-Letbanesamarbejdet (Ring city-Light rail cooperation), which is a collaboration between the municipalities serviced or affected by the line.

== Background ==
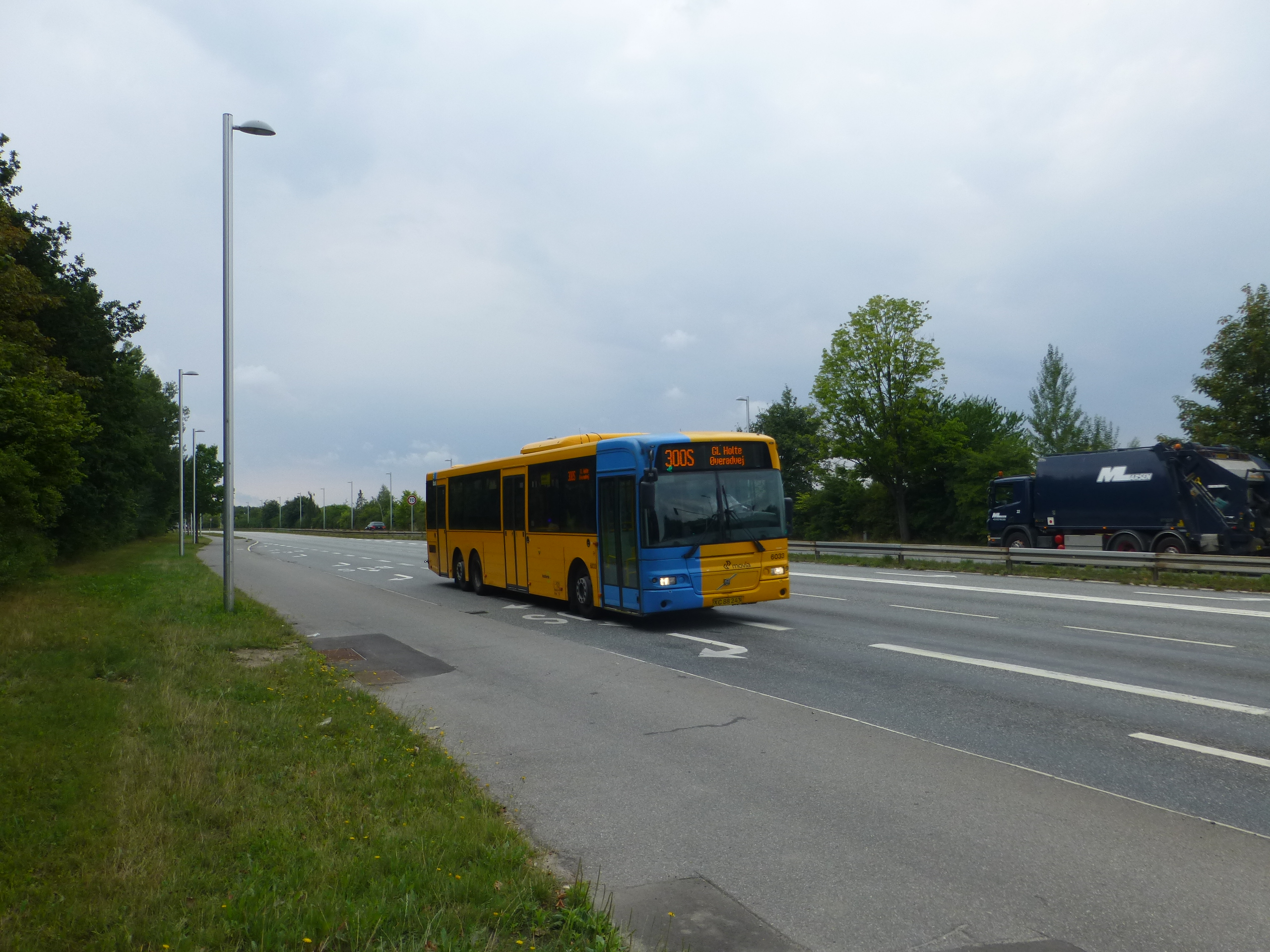
Bus from line 300S at Nordre Ringvej. The light rail has now replaced the entire line.

The rapid transit network of greater Copenhagen consists of a metro system serving the city centre, south-eastern suburbs and one western suburb, and a well-developed S-train network consisting of radial lines and one inner ring line relatively close to the city centre. Further from the city centre, transport between the radials consists of bus lines. Since the suburbs along the radials were expected to grow, a better quality public transport solution between them was thought to be needed. Furthermore, some high passenger volume destinations such as the Technical University and two hospitals were not yet directly accessible through rail transit.

Procurement for the project was structured into five civil works packages and three packages covering equipment, operations, and maintenance. In 2018, Danish construction companies MJ Eriksson, Per Aarsleff, and CG Jensen were awarded the civil works contracts, with CG Jensen additionally commissioned to construct the line’s operations control and maintenance centre.

The transport systems contract, covering both railway infrastructure and rolling stock, was awarded to a consortium of Siemens and Aarsleff Rail. Siemens was contracted to deliver a turnkey solution involving electrification, signalling, communications, workshop equipment as well as overall management of the project. A 15 year operations and maintenance contract was awarded to Metro Service, a subsidiary of ATM Milano, which also operates the Copenhagen Metro.

The southern section, from Ishøj to Rødovre Nord, with 12 stations, opened on 26 October 2025, while the northern section to Lundtofte, comprising 17 stations, opened on 22 August 2026.

Ridership is expected to reach 14.7 million passengers per year by 2030.

== Services ==
Trains depart every 5 minutes from both ends, and every 10 minutes on evenings, Sundays and public holidays. The trip between the termini will be completed in 58 minutes.

== Stations ==
In total the line has 29 stations, six of which will have a connection to the S-train network.

Municipality	Station	S-train connections	Travel time	
Municipality	Station	S-train connections	Southbound	Northbound
Lyngby-Taarbæk	Lundtofte		0	58
Lyngby-Taarbæk	Rævehøjvej (DTU)		1	57
Lyngby-Taarbæk	Anker Engelunds Vej DTU		3	55
Lyngby-Taarbæk	Akademivej DTU		5	53
Lyngby-Taarbæk	Fortunbyen		7	51
Lyngby-Taarbæk	Lyngby Centrum		10	48
Lyngby-Taarbæk	Lyngby	A (S-train) E (S-train)	11	47
Gladsaxe	Gammelmosevej		15	43
Gladsaxe	Buddinge	B (S-train) Bx (S-train)	17	41
Gladsaxe	Gladsaxe Rådhus		18	40
Gladsaxe	Gladsaxevej		20	38
Gladsaxe	Gladsaxe Trafikplads		21	37
Gladsaxe	Dynamovej		23	35
Herlev	Herlev Hospital		25	33
Herlev	Herlev Bymidte		27	31
Herlev	Herlev	C (S-train) H (S-train)	28	30
Herlev	Herlev Syd		30	28
Rødovre and Glostrup	Rødovre Nord		31	27
Glostrup	Glostrup Ejby		33	25
Glostrup	Glostrup Nord		36	22
Glostrup	Glostrup Hospital		38	20
Glostrup	Glostrup	B (S-train) Bx (S-train)	43	15
Brøndby	Kirkebjerg		46	12
Brøndby	Brøndbyvester		48	10
Vallensbæk	Delta Park		51	7
Vallensbæk	Vallensbæk	A (S-train) E (S-train)	51	6
Vallensbæk	Strandhaven		54	4
Ishøj	Ishøj Strand		55	3
Ishøj	Ishøj	A (S-train) E (S-train)	58	0

== Rolling stock ==
In February 2018, 29 Siemens Avenio 4-car low floor trams (27 base order and 2 options) were ordered. The contract includes options for up to 30 trams and maintenance of the trams for 15 years. The trams are light green, distinguishing them as a new and "eco-friendly" mode of transport. The trams have 6 x 100kW motors and weigh approximately 48 tonnes each. They have a capacity of 258, including 64 seats. The entrance height is 350 mm above the rail. The trams are 36.9 m in length and 2.65 m wide. They are equipped with LCD information screens. They were built at the Siemens factory in Kragujevac, Serbia. They were tested at Siemens' Wegberg-Wildenrath Test and Validation Centre and the depot, where they are maintained, in Glostrup.

The trams have step-free boarding and level-access inside, with 4 areas for bicycles, pushchairs and wheelchairs.

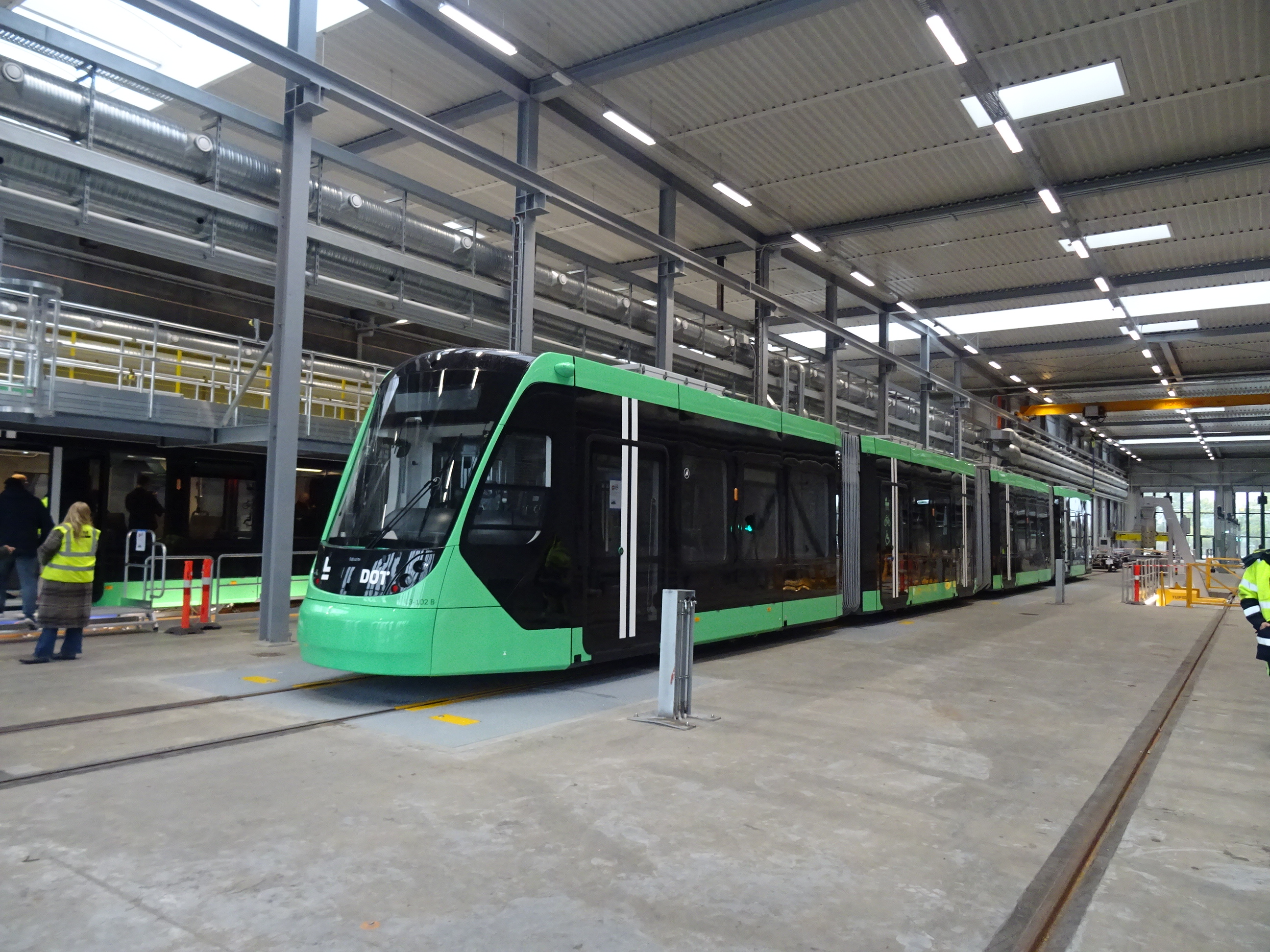
Presentation of Siemens Avenio tram after delivery, Islev workshop

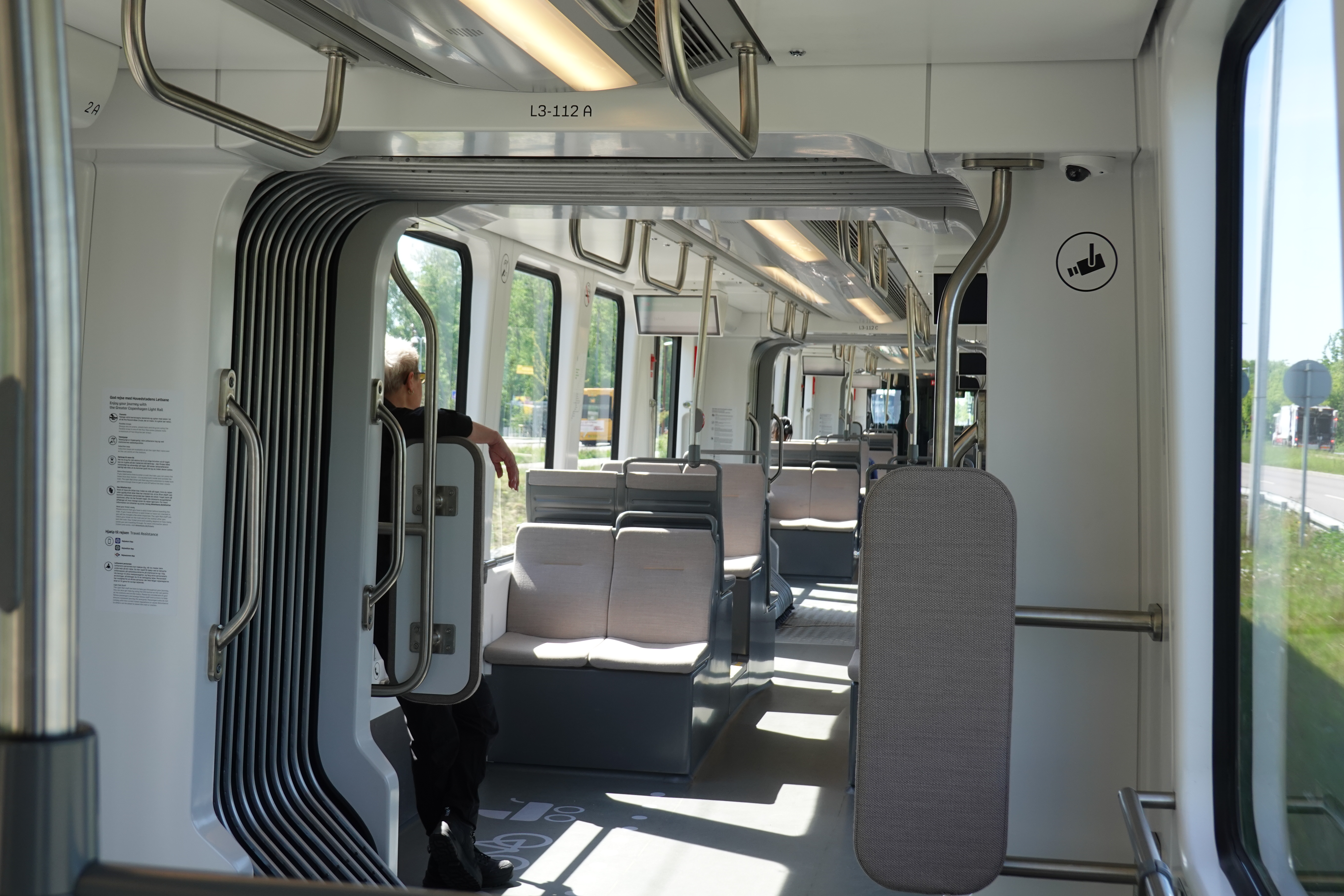
Tram interior

== Financing and ownership ==
The line is be owned through the Ringby-Light rail cooperation by the Ministry of Transport, Capital Region of Denmark and the municipalities of Lyngby-Taarbæk, Gladsaxe, Herlev, Albertslund (no station;in Glostrup, bordering Albertslund), Rødovre, Glostrup, Brøndby, Hvidovre (no station), Vallensbæk, Ishøj and Høje-Taastrup (no station). The Danish state will contribute 40% to the construction, the municipalities 34% and the Capital Region of Denmark will contribute 26%.

Originally estimated to cost 6.2 billion kr. and later 8.2 billion kr. in 2022, the final cost is expected to be 9.6 billion kr. ($1.48 billion).

== Further extensions ==
Possible extensions beyond the Ring 3 line have been examined in official planning studies. Preparatory material for the Ring 3 project referred to a possible second stage from Park Allé to Brøndby Strand and Avedøre Holme.

In 2013, the Capital Region of Denmark analysed possible light-rail links between Glostrup Station and Copenhagen Airport. The study considered a southern corridor via Avedøre Holme, Ørestad Station and Løjtegårdsvej, a northern corridor via Hvidovre Hospital, Ny Ellebjerg and Bella Center, and a possible first stage of the northern corridor between Glostrup Station and Ny Ellebjerg.

In 2018, a separate study by the Copenhagen Municipality examined a possible light-rail corridor from Nørrebro Station to Gladsaxe Trafikplads via Tingbjerg and Frederikssundsvej, intended to improve links between the M3 City Circle line and the Ring 3 light rail.

In 2021, following a decision by the Regional Council of the Capital Region, Metroselskabet prepared a screening-level analysis of five possible extensions: Lundtofte-Nærum Station, Lundtofte-Gammel Holte, Lundtofte-Kokkedal Station, Gladsaxe Trafikplads-Avedøre Holme, and Glostrup Station-Avedøre Holme. The Glostrup Station-Avedøre Holme option was described as a branch from the Ring 3 line at Kirkebjerg via Park Allé, Brøndby Town Hall, Brøndby Stadium and Brøndby Strand Station to Avedøre Holme. For the northern corridor, the same report noted that a later branch from Hørsholm to Rungsted Kyst Station could be considered, although its economic and ridership effects were not assessed.

The 2021 analysis found that Gladsaxe Trafikplads-Avedøre Holme would generate the largest increase in light-rail boardings, while Lundtofte-Kokkedal Station would have the highest forecast ridership among the northern options.

== See also ==
- Aarhus Letbane
- Transport in Copenhagen
- Stockholm Tvärbanan - a similar orbital line operating in Stockholm since 2000
- Helsinki light rail line 15 - a similar orbital line operating in Helsinki since 2023
- List of town tramway systems in Denmark
- Odense Letbane
