= Vallensbæk railway station =

Commuter railway station in Greater Copenhagen, Denmark

Vallensbæk
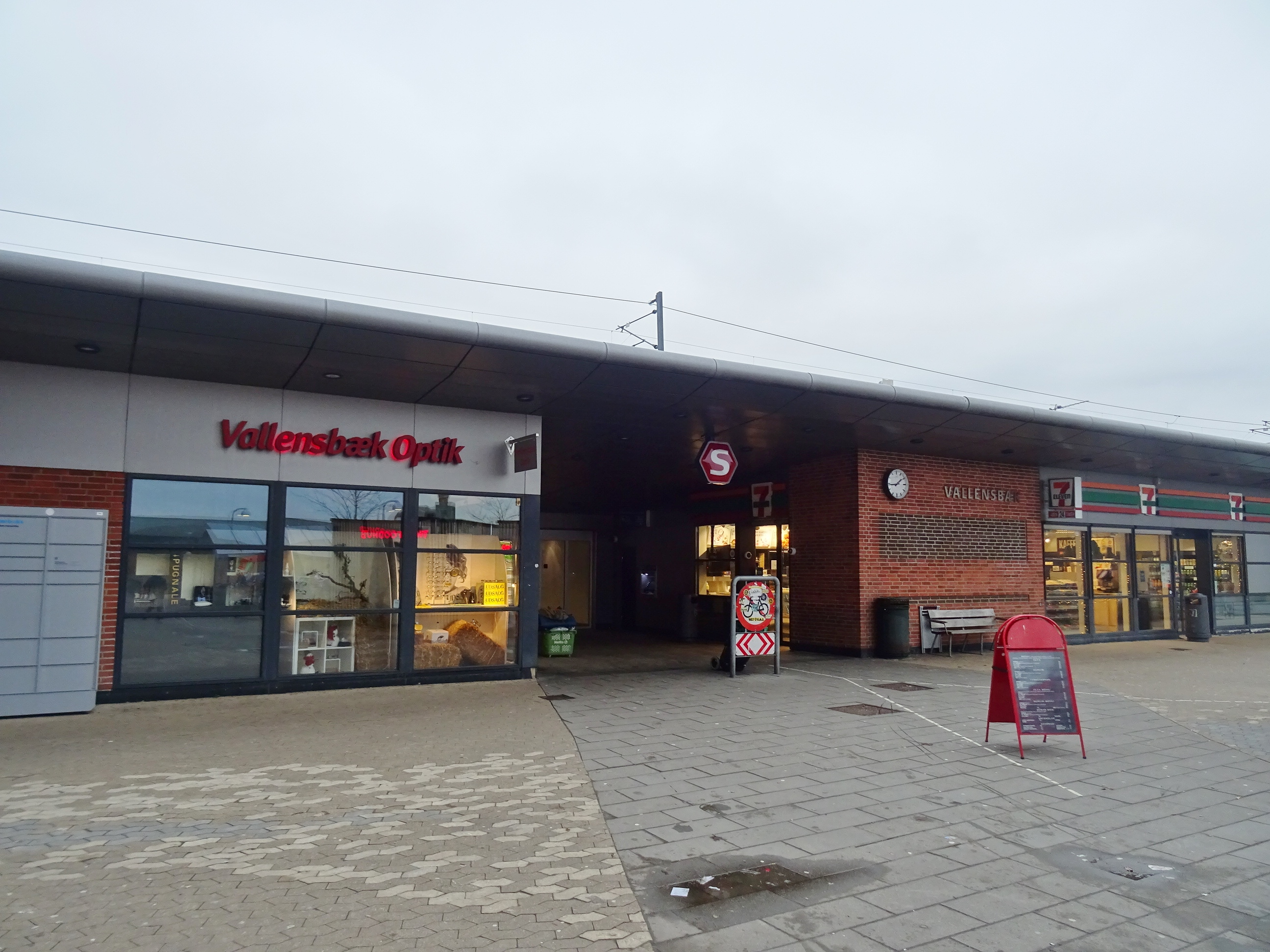
- Vallensbæk station in 2022

General information
- Location: Centervej 2; 2665 Vallensbæk Strand; Vallensbæk Municipality; Denmark
- Coordinates: 55°37′24″N 12°23′12″E
- Elevation: 9.3 metres (31 ft)
- Owner: DSB (station infrastructure); Banedanmark (rail infrastructure)
- Platforms: Island platform
- Tracks: 2
- Train operators: DSB

Services
Preceding station	S-train	Following station
Brøndby Strand towards Hillerød	A	Ishøj towards Hundige
Copenhagen South towards Holte	E Mon–Fri	Ishøj towards Køge
Brøndby Strand towards Hillerød	A Sat–Sun	Ishøj towards Køge
Preceding station	Hovedstadens Letbane	Following station
Strandhaven towards Ishøj	Greater Copenhagen Light Rail	Delta Park towards Rødovre Nord
Location

Vallensbæk station is an S-train railway station serving the suburb of Vallensbæk Strand southwest of Copenhagen, Denmark. The station is located on the Køge radial of Copenhagen's S-train network. It serves the southern end of Vallensbæk Municipality, whereas the northern part of the municipality is better served by Albertslund railway station on the Høje Taastrup radial.

== History ==
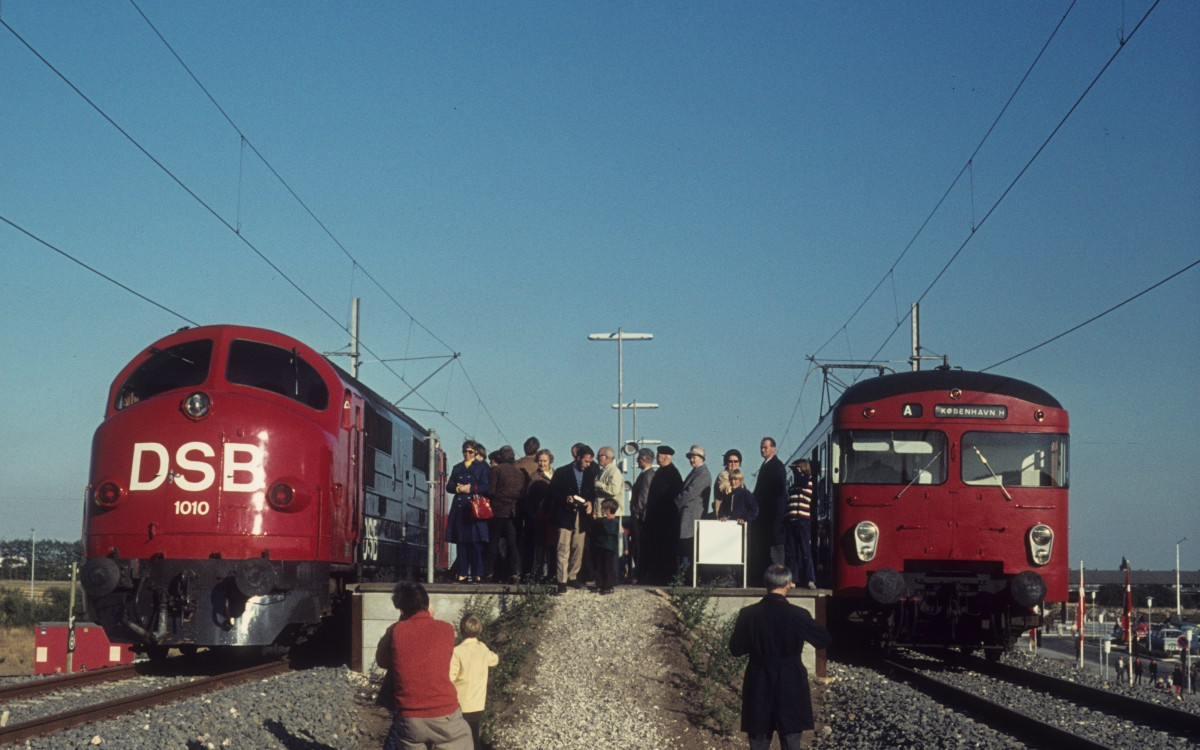
Vallensbæk station on the opening day in 1972.

The station was inaugurated on 30 September 1972 as the first section of the Køge Bay Line from Copenhagen to Vallensbæk was completed. On 26 September 1976 the railway line was continued beyond Vallensbæk, as the second section of the Køge Bay Line from Vallensbæk to Hundige was completed. Since 6 October 2025, the Greater Copenhagen Light Rail has a stop at Vallensbæk station.

== See also ==
- List of Copenhagen S-train stations
- List of railway stations in Denmark
- Rail transport in Denmark
- Transport in Copenhagen
