= Brøndby Strand =

Coordinates: 55.618776°N 12.417372°E

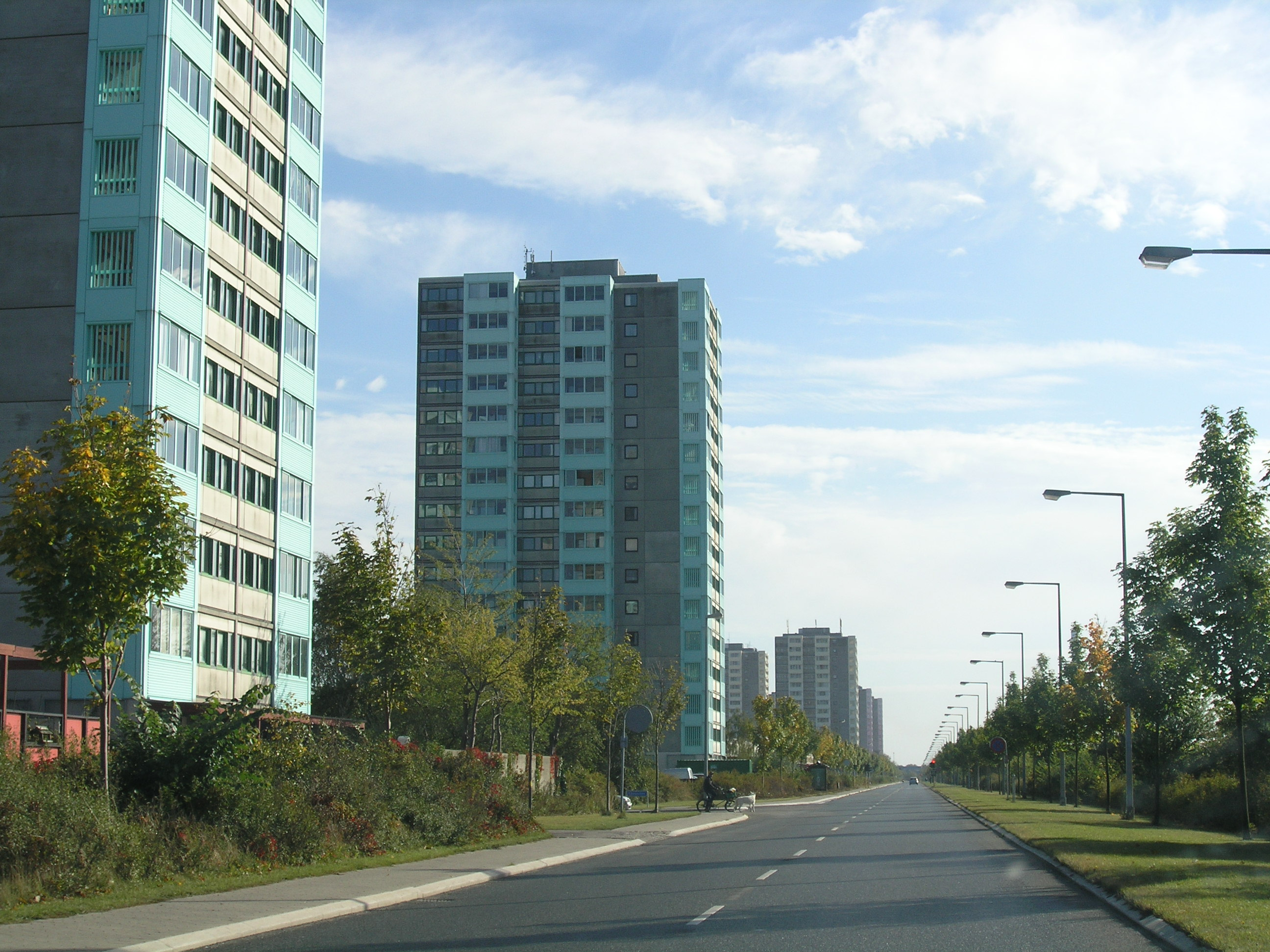
Brøndby Strand projects

Brøndby Strand (in English: 'Well Town' Beach) is a suburb in Brøndby Municipality, approximately 13 km (8.1 mi) south-west of central Copenhagen, Denmark

== Overview ==
Brøndby Strand contains a large housing project, in which 8,000 of the suburb's 11,000 inhabitants live. The area is known for having various social problems: many of the inhabitants are unemployed. Of the total population, 60% are immigrants or Danes with immigrant parents, most of whom live in the housing projects. It contains about a dozen high-rise residential estates of a big multicultural mix, and is home to a number of successful hip hop and urban rap artists of national and international stature. The suburb is connected with the S-train.

== Notable people ==
=== Music ===
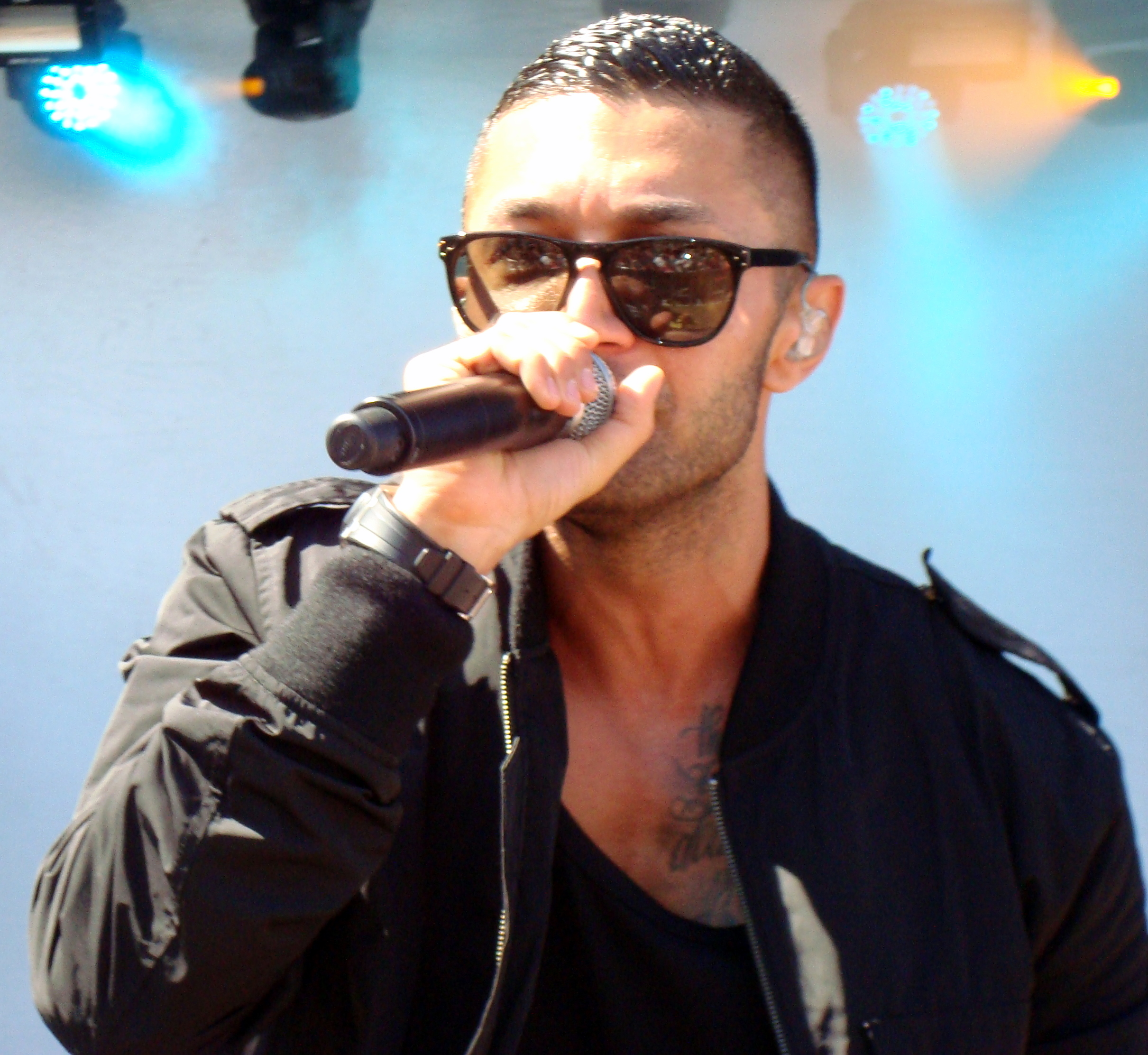
Burhan G, 2011

- Majid (born 1975) a Danish rapper of Moroccan-Berber origin
- Burhan Genç Koç (born 1983) known as Burhan G, a Danish R&B and pop singer, songwriter and producer
- Sivas Torbati (born ca. 1990) known as Sivas a Danish rapper of Iranian origin
- Outlandish (1997-2017) a hip-hop music group

=== Sport ===
- Nicholas Gotfredsen (born 1989) a Danish footballer, plays for Hobro IK
- Jesper Lindstrøm (born 2000) a Danish footballer, plays for Eintracht Frankfurt

== See also ==
- Brøndbyvester
- Brøndbyøster
- Brøndby Strand railway station
