= Hundige =

Suburb in Denmark

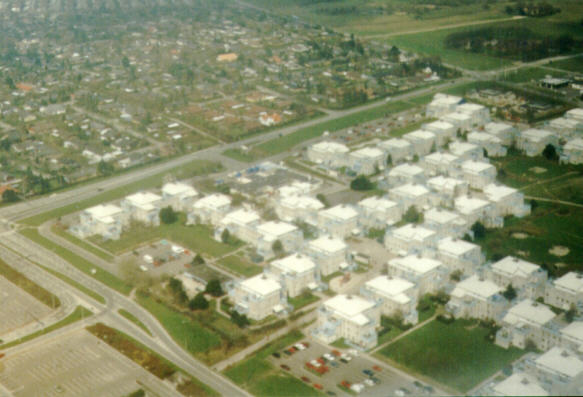
- Aerial view of Hundige, with the large grey buildings of the Askerød housing project.

- Location within Denmark
- Coordinates: 55°36′N 12°20′E

Hundige is a suburb 18 kilometres (11 mi) southwest of Copenhagen in Greve Municipality. The suburb was originally a small town, but redeveloped into a suburb in the 1960s. The suburb was connected to Copenhagen's S-train network in 1976 and is served by Hundige railway station.

== Shopping center ==
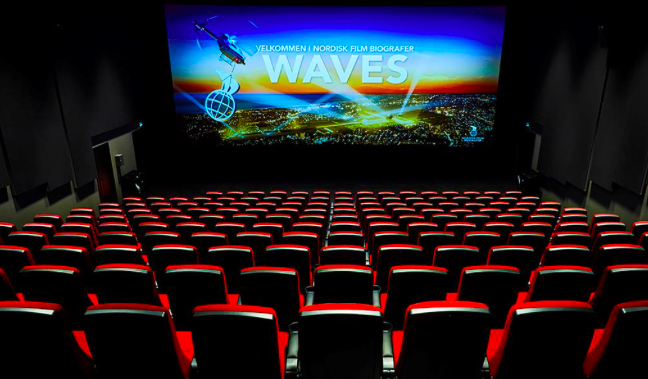
Nordisk Film cinema at Waves.

The Hundige StorCenter, a large shopping mall, was built in 1974. Since re-opening in 2009, the shopping center has been called Waves. It is the largest mall in Denmark by leasable space with approximately 78,000 m^{2}. The mall houses the third largest Bilka in Denmark and has more than 135 stores and restaurants. The mall has 3,200 free parking lots as shopping in the mall is mainly car based. The mall employs more than 1,500 people making it the largest employer in Greve Municipality.

== Crime ==
The suburb used to have a relatively high crime rate, concentrated in the large housing project called Askerød in the northern part of the suburb. There were media reports of crime and internal strife within immigration communities, and there was at least one notable incident of homicide in the past Askerød is a concrete housing project made up of 3-4 story concrete buildings containing a total of 722 apartments. The majority of people living in "Askerød" are first and second generation immigrants, most of whom are under the age of 18. As of December 1st 2025, Askerød was eventually removed again from the government's official list of "Parallel societies" (colloquially known as the "ghetto-list").

The housing project called Gersagerparken was also known for criminal activity including Drive-by shooting as the project was the previous home of the Black Cobra gang, before the gang moved to the town Ishøj and Karlslunde. Gersagerparken has seen a decrease in criminal activity since then, the most notable criminal activity being a raid on a potential bombs producer.

== Notable people ==
- Bodil Joensen (1944 in Hundige – 1985), a Danish pornographic actress.
- Lars Ankerstjerne Christensen (born 1984 in Hundige), a Danish rapper and songwriter.
- DB King, a Danish rapper and songwriter.
- Ghali, a Danish rapper and songwriter.
- Sleiman (born 1982 in Lebanon, raised in Hundige), a Danish rapper and songwriter known for his criminal past and affiliation to the local gang Bloodz.
- Theresa (Tessa) Ann Fallesen, a Danish rapper and songwriter.
- Ricki Olsen (born 1988 in Hundige), a Danish football player with 250 club caps.
- Mai Surrow (born 1992), a Danish badminton player, lives in Hundige.
