= A (S-train) =

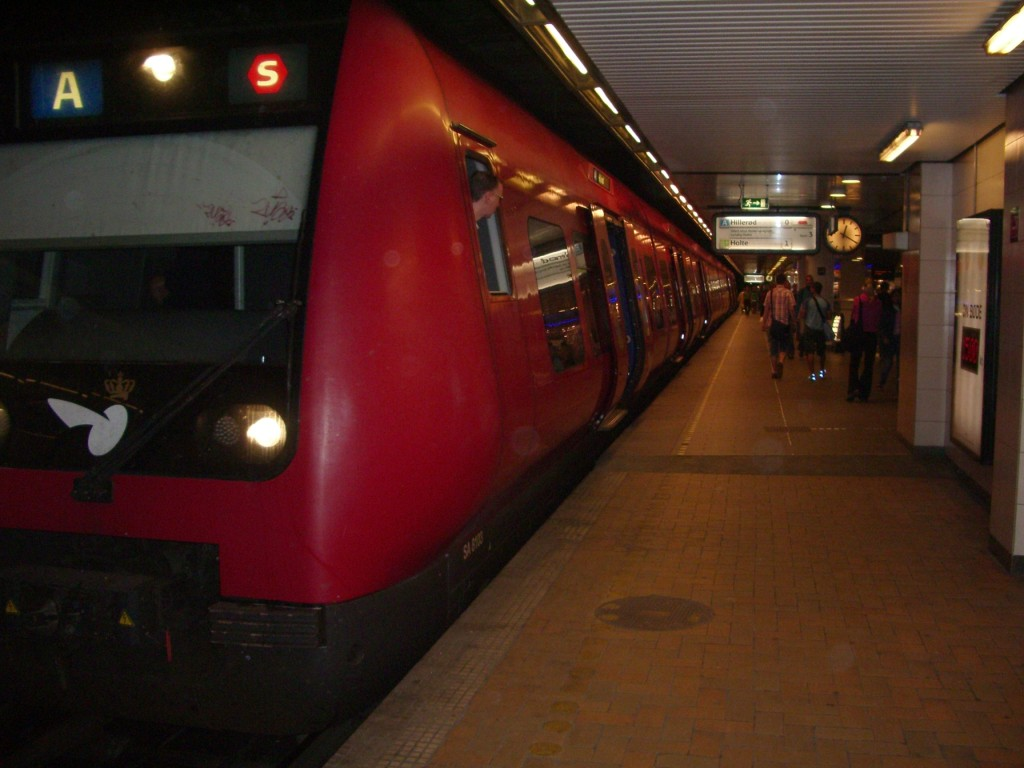
- A train at Nørreport station

Overview
- Status: Operational
- Owner: Banedanmark
- Locale: Metropolitan Copenhagen
- Termini: Solrød Strand; Hillerød
- Stations: 35

Service
- Type: Suburban rail, urban rail
- System: S-train
- Operator: DSB
- Rolling stock: Litra SA and SE

History
- Opened: 15 May 1934; 92 years ago

Technical
- Line length: 57 km (35 mi)
- Number of tracks: 2
- Track gauge: 1,435 mm (4 ft 8 1/2 in) standard gauge
- Electrification: 1650 V DC overhead lines
- Operating speed: 120 km/h (75 mph)

A is a service on the S-train network in Copenhagen. It is one of the base services on the network, running every 20 minutes from about 5:00 to 0:30 every day, and every 10 minutes from about 6:15 to 19:00. It runs between Hundige and Hillerød, serving all stations on the inner part of the Køge radial. During daytime on weekdays, every second train continues from Hundige station to Solrød Strand station. On Friday and Saturday nights there is also a 30 minutes service throughout the night.

S-train system map

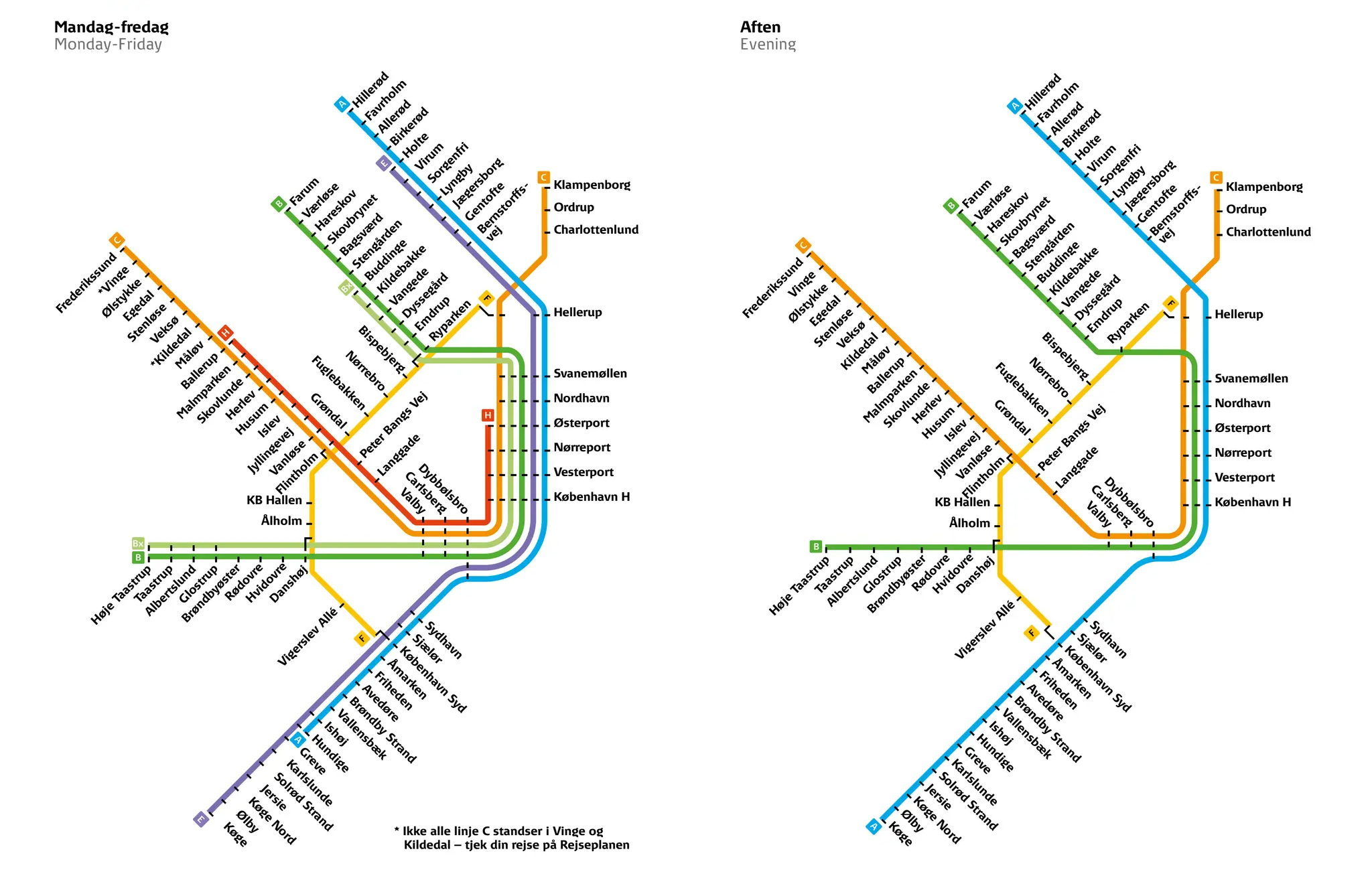
S-train system map

== History ==
Since the first part of the Køge radial opened in 1972, letter A has been used for the principal service on its inner part. Before that time the most constant characteristic of service A was that it ran on the Klampenborg radial in the northern end of the system.

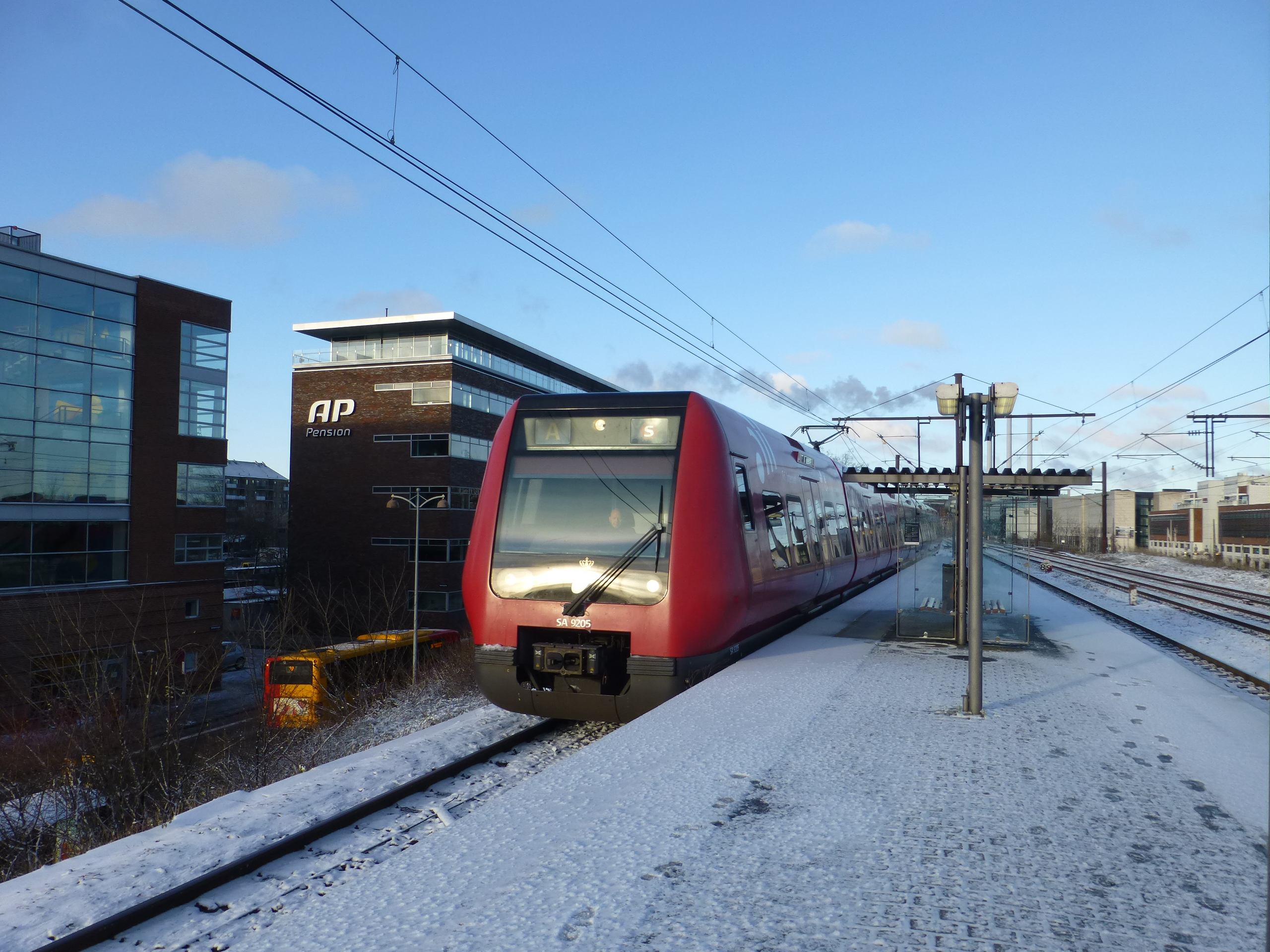
Line A at Nordhavn Station

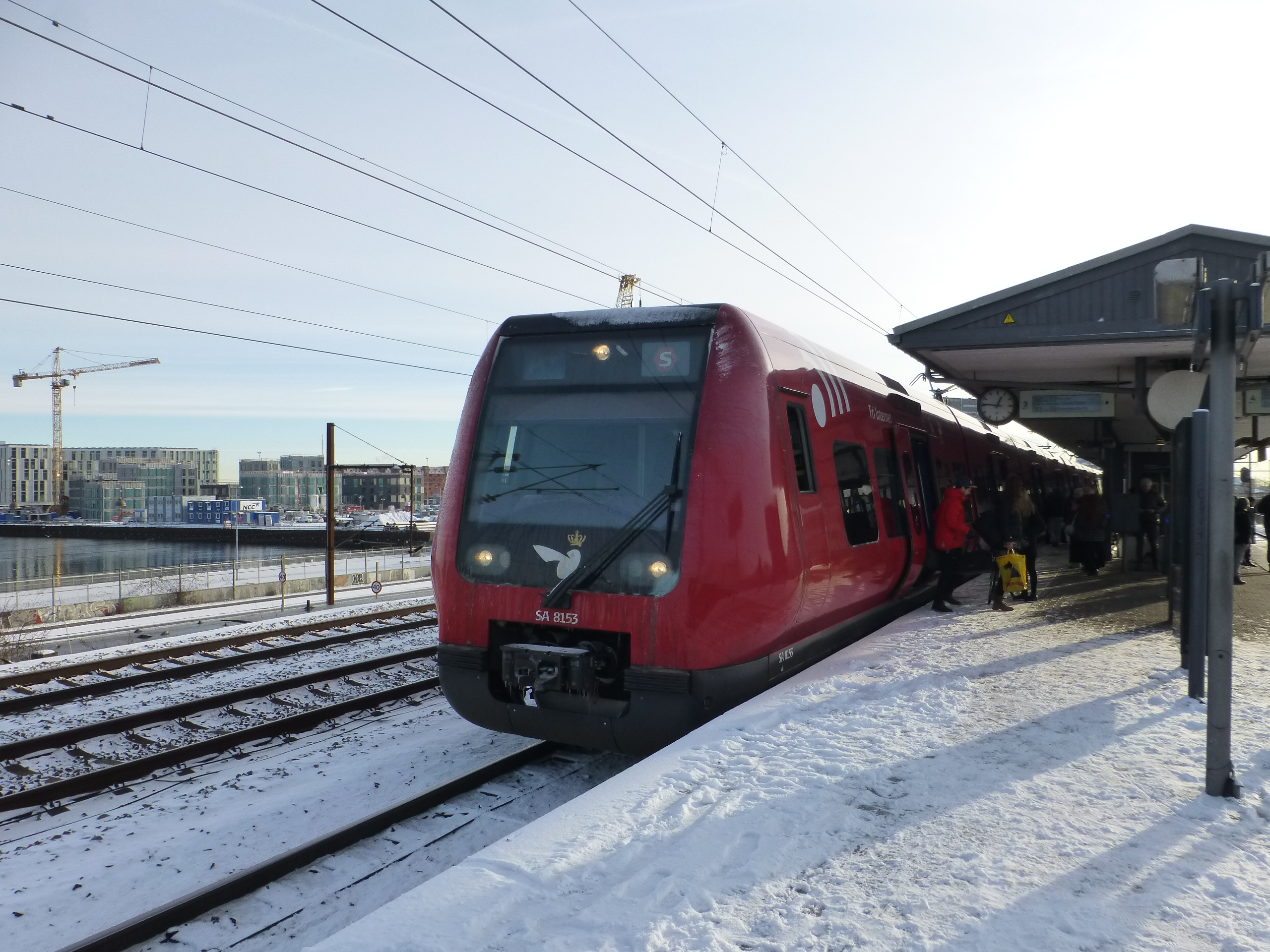
Line A at Nordhavn Station

Name	Southern end	Years	Northern end
1a	all stops to Valby	1934–1940	Klampenborgbanen: all stops to Klampenborg
1a	terminated at København H	1940–1950	Klampenborgbanen: all stops to Klampenborg
	Frederikssundbanen: all stops to Vanløse	1950–1952	Klampenborgbanen: all stops to Klampenborg
	as above, extended to Herlev in rush hours	1952–1972	Klampenborgbanen: all stops to Klampenborg
	Køgebugtbanen: all stops to Vallensbæk	1972–1976	Klampenborgbanen: all stops to Klampenborg
	all stops to Hundige	1976–1979	Klampenborgbanen: all stops to Klampenborg
	all stops to Hundige; extended to Solrød Strand evenings and weekends	1979–1983	Nordbanen: all stops to Holte
	all stops to Hundige	1983–1989	Nordbanen: all stops to Holte
	all stops to Hundige	1989–1999	Nordbanen: to Hillerød, non-stop Østerport-Hellerup-Lyngby-Holte
	all stops to Hundige	1999–2007	as above except all stops until Hellerup
	all stops to Hundige	2007–2009	Hareskovbanen: all stops to Farum
	all stops to Hundige; some daytime trains to Solrød Strand	Dec 2009–2018	Hareskovbanen: all stops to Farum
	all stops to Hundige; some daytime trains to Solrød Strand	2018–	Nordbanen: non-stop Hellerup-Jægersborg, all stops to Hillerød

=== Ax, K, A+ ===
Until 2007, separate service designations were used for trains that reinforced the basic service on the Køge radial in high-traffic periods. This was in part because they had their own stopping patterns, and in part due to the then-current doctrine that a service letter such as A must not be used for more than exactly 3 trains an hour. The first supplementary service was the rush-hour Ax which started running when the first phase of the Køge radial opened in 1972. It was upgraded to the daytime K service in 1992 and quickly renamed to A+ in 1993.

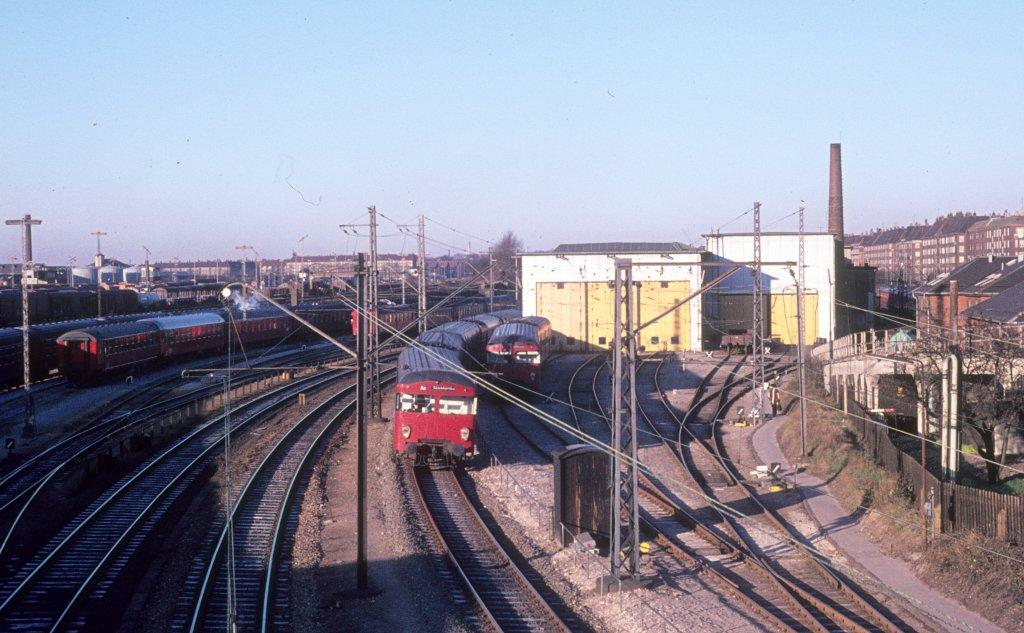
2nd generation S-train on line Ax at Dybbølsbro in 1975. Line Ax

Name	Southern end	Years	Northern end
Ax	Køgebugtbanen: all stops to Vallensbæk	1972–1976	terminated at Hellerup
Ax	all stops to Hundige	1976–1979	terminated at Hellerup
Ax	to Hundige but stopping where?	1979–1983	terminated at Hellerup or Østerport?
Ax	to Hundige, non-stop København H - Friheden	1983–1992	terminated at Østerport
K	to Hundige, non-stop København H - Friheden	1992–1993	terminated at Østerport
A+	to Hundige, non-stop København H - Friheden	1993–1995	terminated at Østerport
A+	to Køge, non-stop København H - Sjælør - Friheden	1995–1998	terminated at Østerport
A+	as above, plus stop at Sydhavn	1998–2002	terminated at Østerport
A+	as above, plus stop at Dybbølsbro	2002–2005	terminated at Østerport
A+	as above, plus stop at Dybbølsbro	2006–2007	Hareskovbanen: to Buddinge Mon-Fri
Joined into A from September 2007

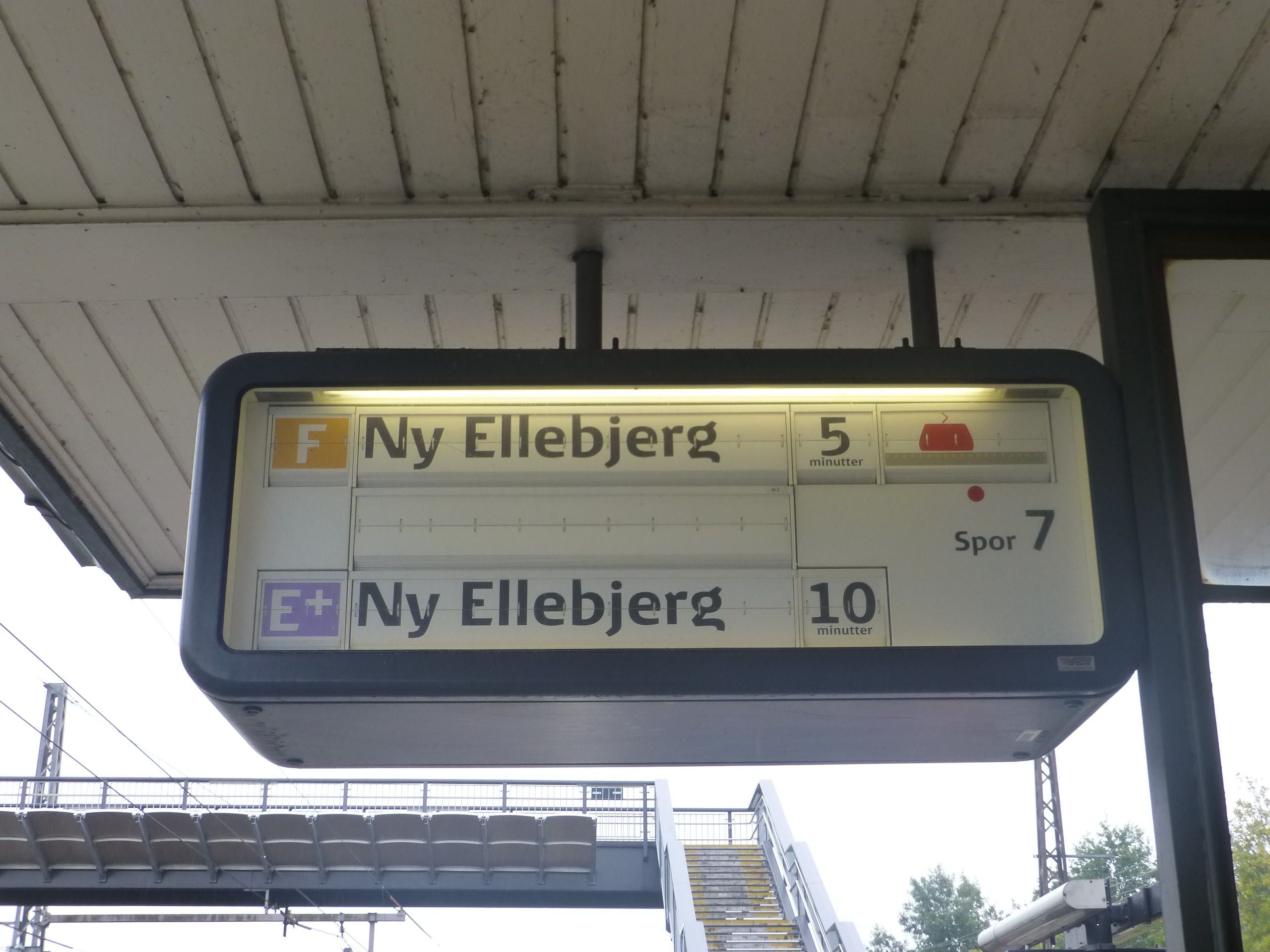
Incorrect signage in Hellerup. In 2002, it was considered to rename line A+ to E+, but only the flap signs were prepared.

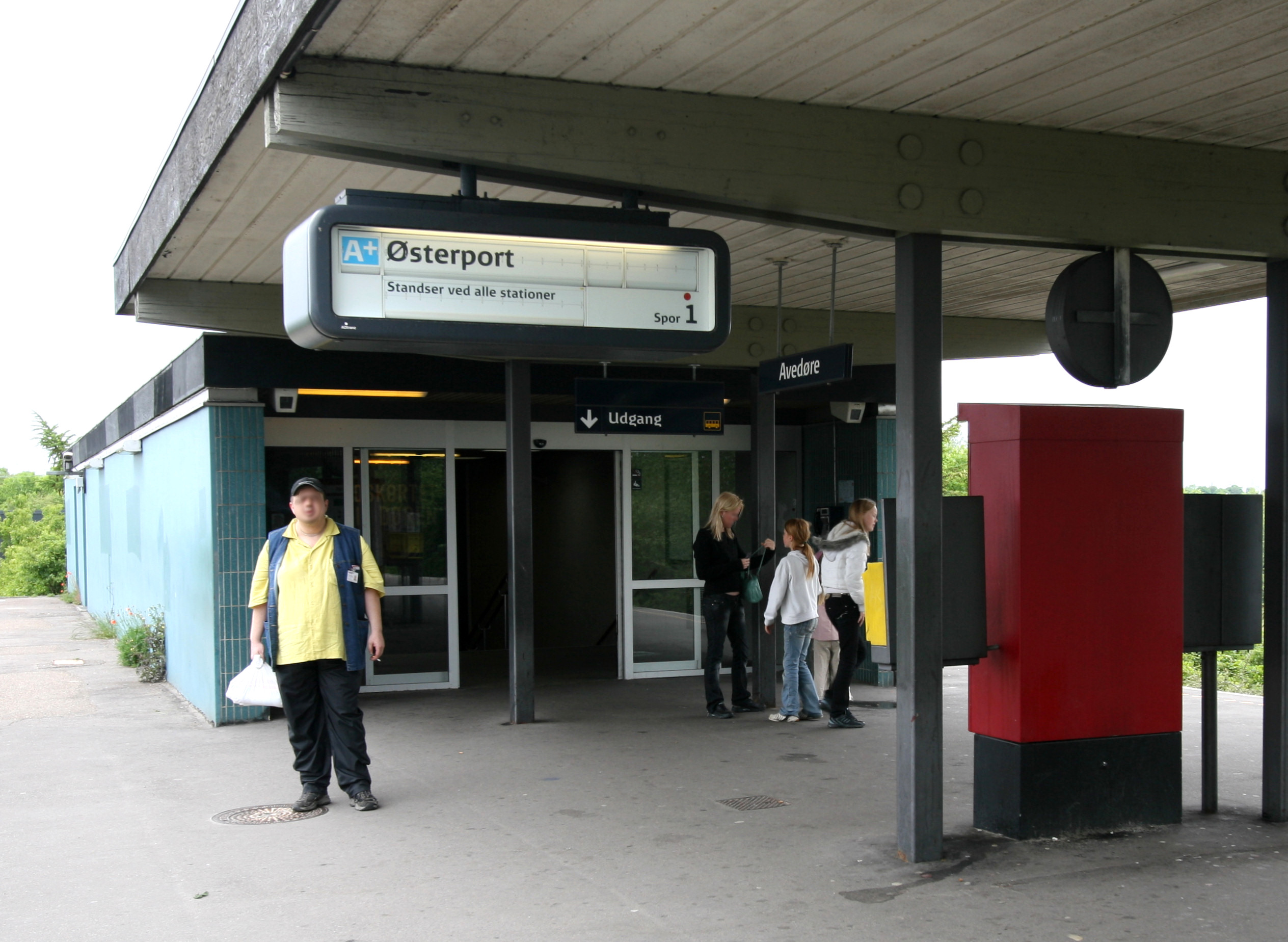
Line A+ at Avedøre Station.
