= Hundige railway station =

Commuter railway station in Greater Copenhagen, Denmark

Hundige
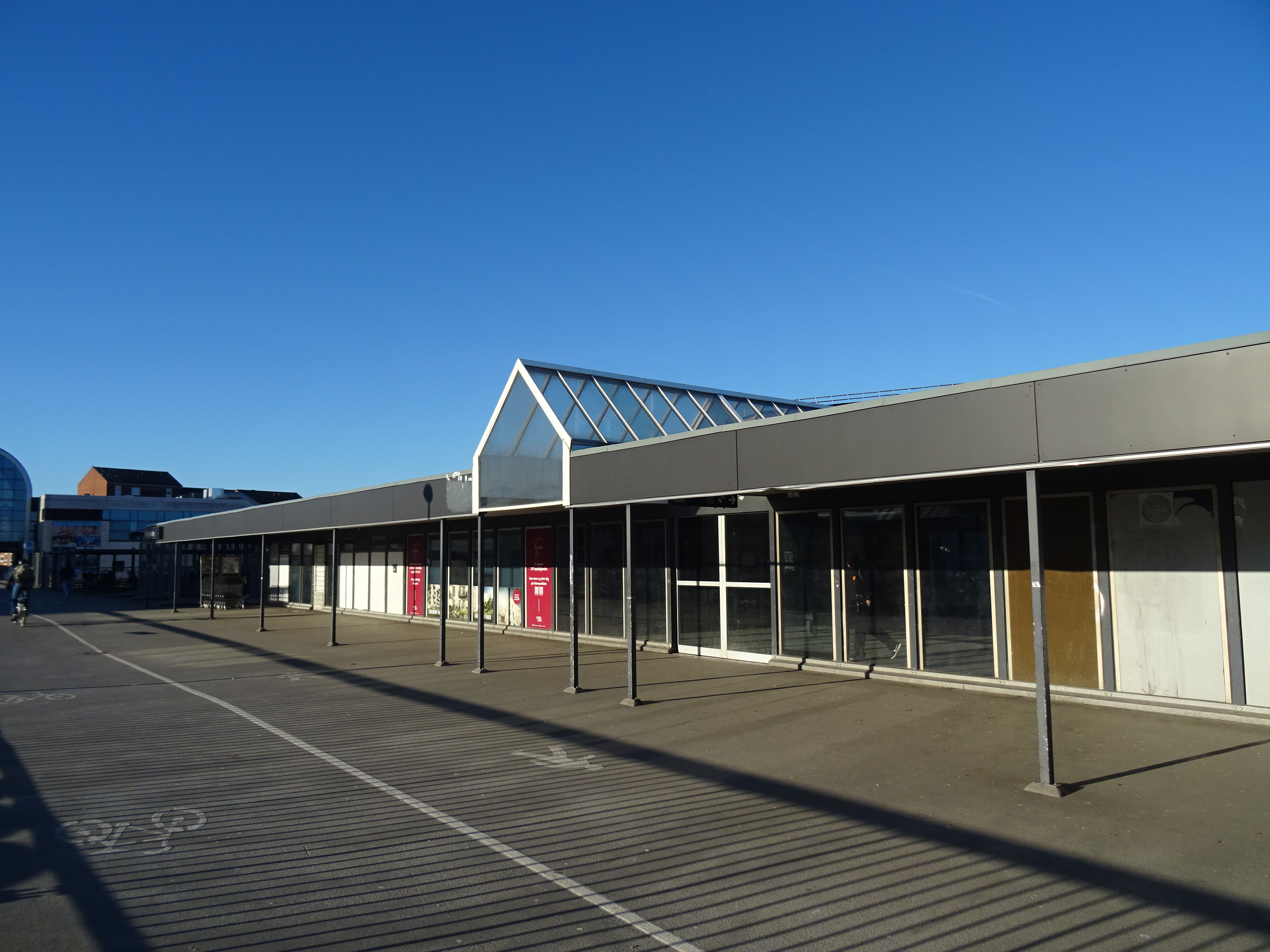
- South entrance of Hundige station in 2024

General information
- Location: Hundige Stationsvej, Hundige; 2670 Greve Strand; Greve Municipality; Denmark
- Coordinates: 55°35′53″N 12°20′02″E
- Elevation: 9.4 metres (31 ft)
- Owner: DSB (station infrastructure); Banedanmark (rail infrastructure)
- Platforms: 2 island platforms 1 side platform
- Tracks: 4
- Train operators: DSB

History
- Opened: 1976

Services
Preceding station	S-train	Following station
Ishøj towards Hillerød	A	Terminus
Ishøj towards Holte	E Mon–Fri	Greve towards Køge
Ishøj towards Hillerød	A Sat–Sun	Greve towards Køge
Location

Hundige station is a suburban rail railway station serving the suburb of Hundige southwest of Copenhagen, Denmark. The station is located on the Køge radial of the Copenhagen's S-train network. It is situated close to the WAVES shopping center.

Hundige station opened along with the extension of the Køge radial from Vallensbæk station to Hundige in 1976: Since then, it has been the terminus of the S-train service A, and a stop on all other lines on the Køge radial. Hundige station is however now only an occasional terminus for service A, since in the daytime on weekdays, every second train in the service continues to Solrød Strand station.

Hundige station is a hub for public transportation in its area; right next to the platforms and tracks, is an array of designated bus stops for each of several bus lines serving the area, a pick-up and drop-off zone for taxis and private vehicles, and a parking lot.

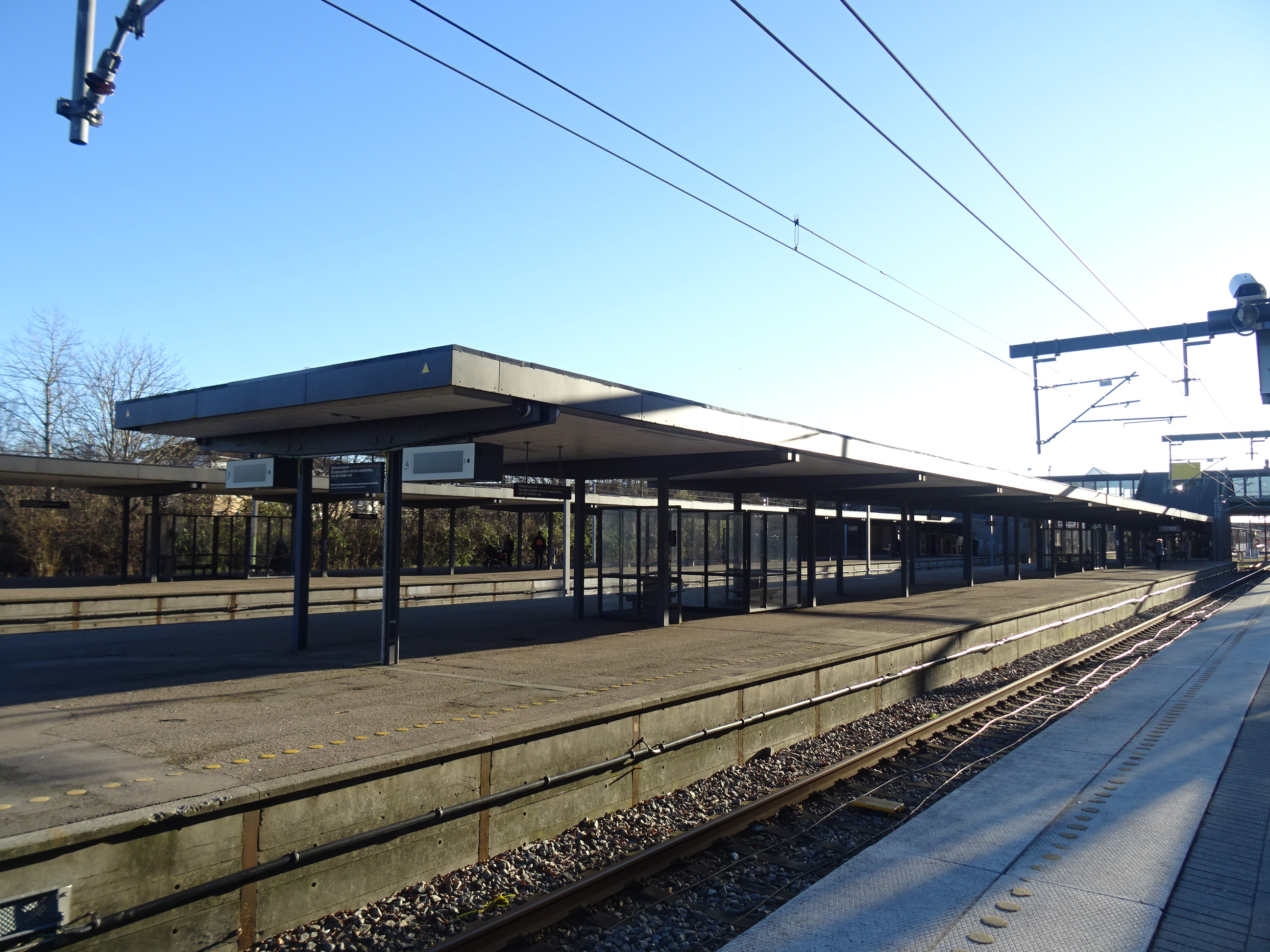
Platform at Hundige station

== History ==
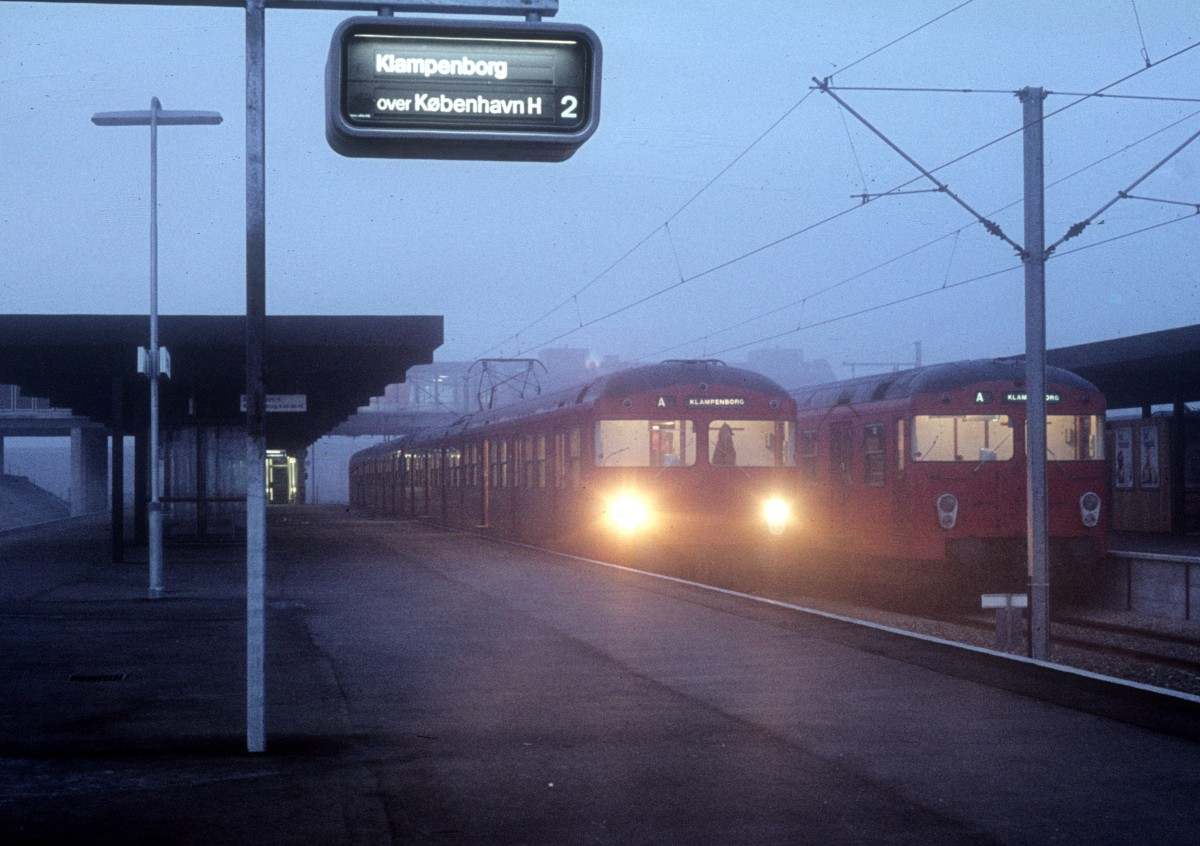
The first S-train ready to depart from Hundige station to Klampenborg on 26 September 1976.

Hundige station was inaugurated on 25 September 1976 as the second section of the Køge Bay Line from Vallensbæk to Hundige was completed, and the following day the station opened to regular traffic.

On 30 September 1979, the railway line was continued beyond Hundige, as the third section of the Køge Bay Line from Hundige to Solrød Strand was completed.

== See also ==
- List of Copenhagen S-train stations
- List of railway stations in Denmark
