= A-bus (Copenhagen) =

Bus network in Copenhagen, Denmark

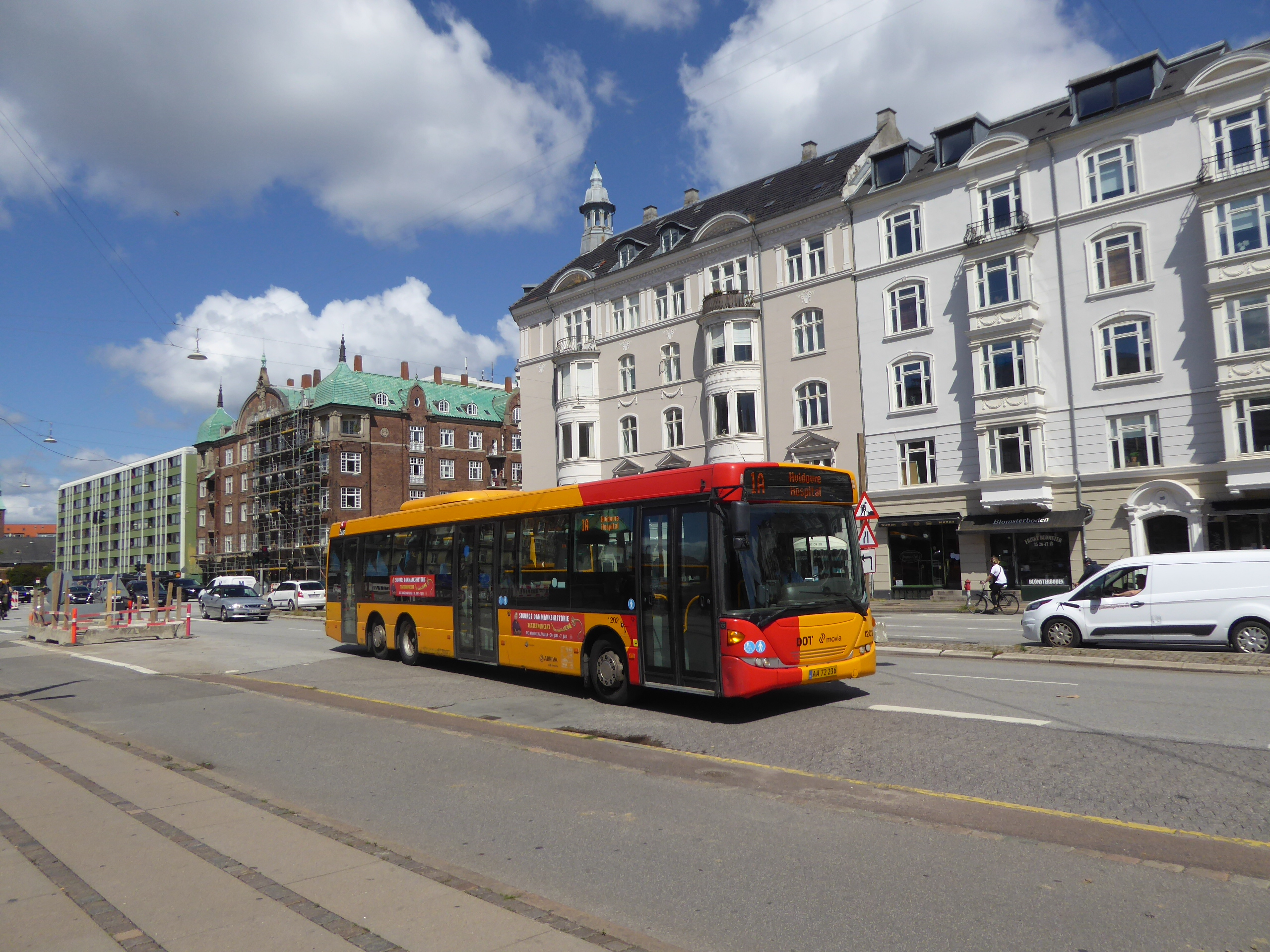
Line 1A on Østerbrogade

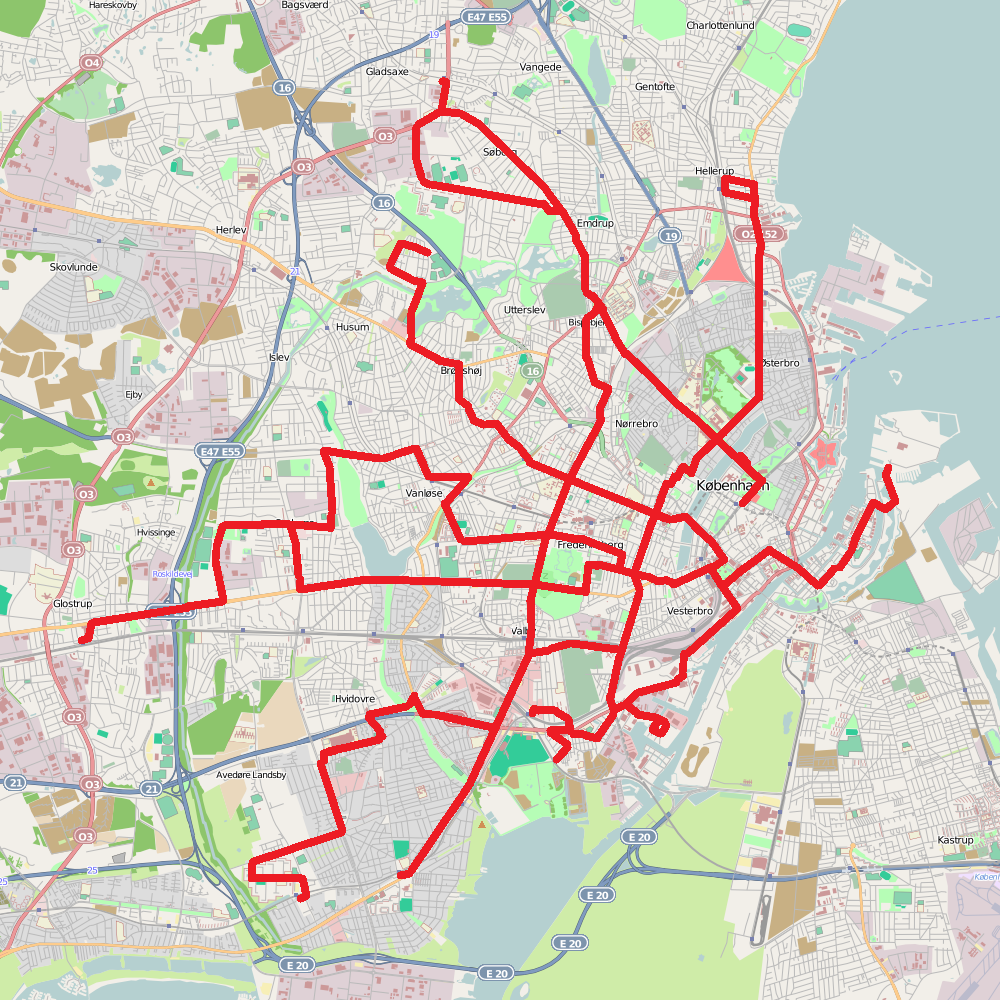
A-bus transit net in Copenhagen, October 2019

A-buses are a type of city bus in Copenhagen that run frequently and make use of many stops around the city. They were introduced on October 20, 2002, by the now-defunct HUR Trafik, to coincide with the opening of the first stage of the Copenhagen Metro. Today, the A-buses are run by Movia, who outsource operations to various contractors. The buses are easily identifiable as yellow with red corners at the front and back.

As of October 13, 2019, there are 6 A-bus lines, and a further three which have been discontinued and one further line which was integrated into the Cityring. During rush hour, the buses don't follow a specific timetable, but they run instead at regular intervals which can be as short as 3–4 minutes. In the evenings, there are about 10 minutes between each A-bus, while at night they run every 20 to 30 minutes. On some stretches, however, only every other bus serves the entirety of the route. In 2019, the seven, and later six, A-bus lines carried 52.9 million passengers, equivalent to 26.7% of all Movia's passengers.

A-buses can also found in Køge, Roskilde, Ringsted, Holbæk and Helsingør, where Movia has set up several routes in each town between 2009 and 2011. This is also the case in Aarhus, where Midttrafik runs an A-bus service.

== General ==
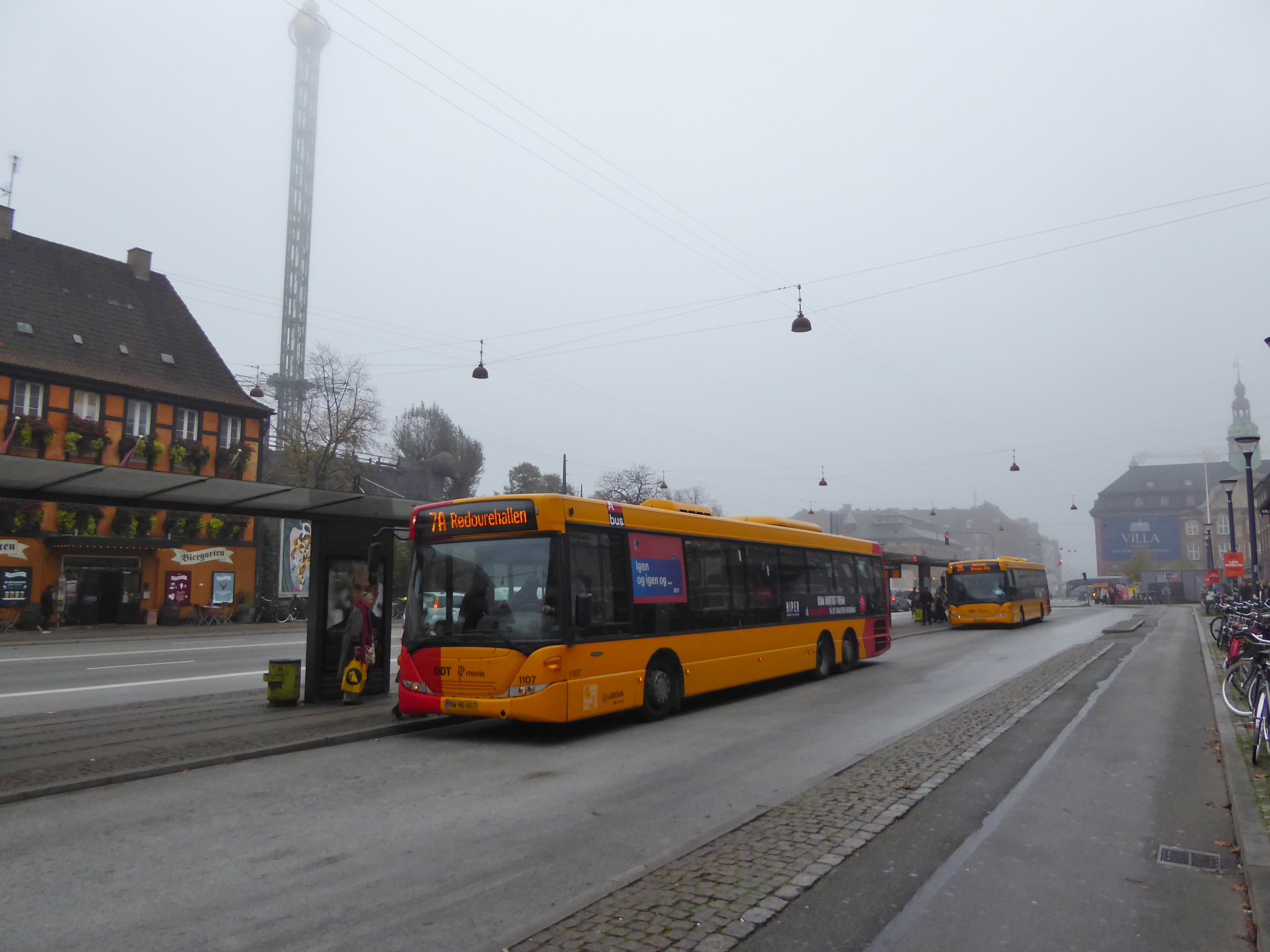
Line 7A on Bernstorffsgade by Copenhagen Central Station

A-buses were initially HUR Trafik's and now Movia's vision of bus rapid transit (BRT) for Copenhagen. Similar services are also found in many other larger cities, though under different names, such as the Metrobuses in Aalborg and blue buses in Stockholm. The concept involves creating routes with a frequent and direct service as their main attraction. They are easily identifiable with their red corners on the front-right and back-left sides. The bus stops are marked with red signs, and at many of them there is an automated countdown to the arrival of the next bus.

All the A-bus routes in Copenhagen run around the clock. The majority of the network runs on a time-interval based timetable. For most passengers there is no need for more specific information anyway as there is a departure every 10 minutes or less. On certain routes, and at night, a normal timetable is used as there is a longer period of time between buses.

Most of the A-bus lines use 13.7-metre long buses that allow space for plenty of passengers. However, on line 9A, a regular 12 metre bus is used, and on line 4A, a 13.2 metre long bus is used. Electric articulated buses are used on line 2A, and are able to charge at the final stop at each end of the route. It is possible to exit and enter buses using all doors on all six A-bus lines, including line 5C.

== History ==
=== Early Plans ===
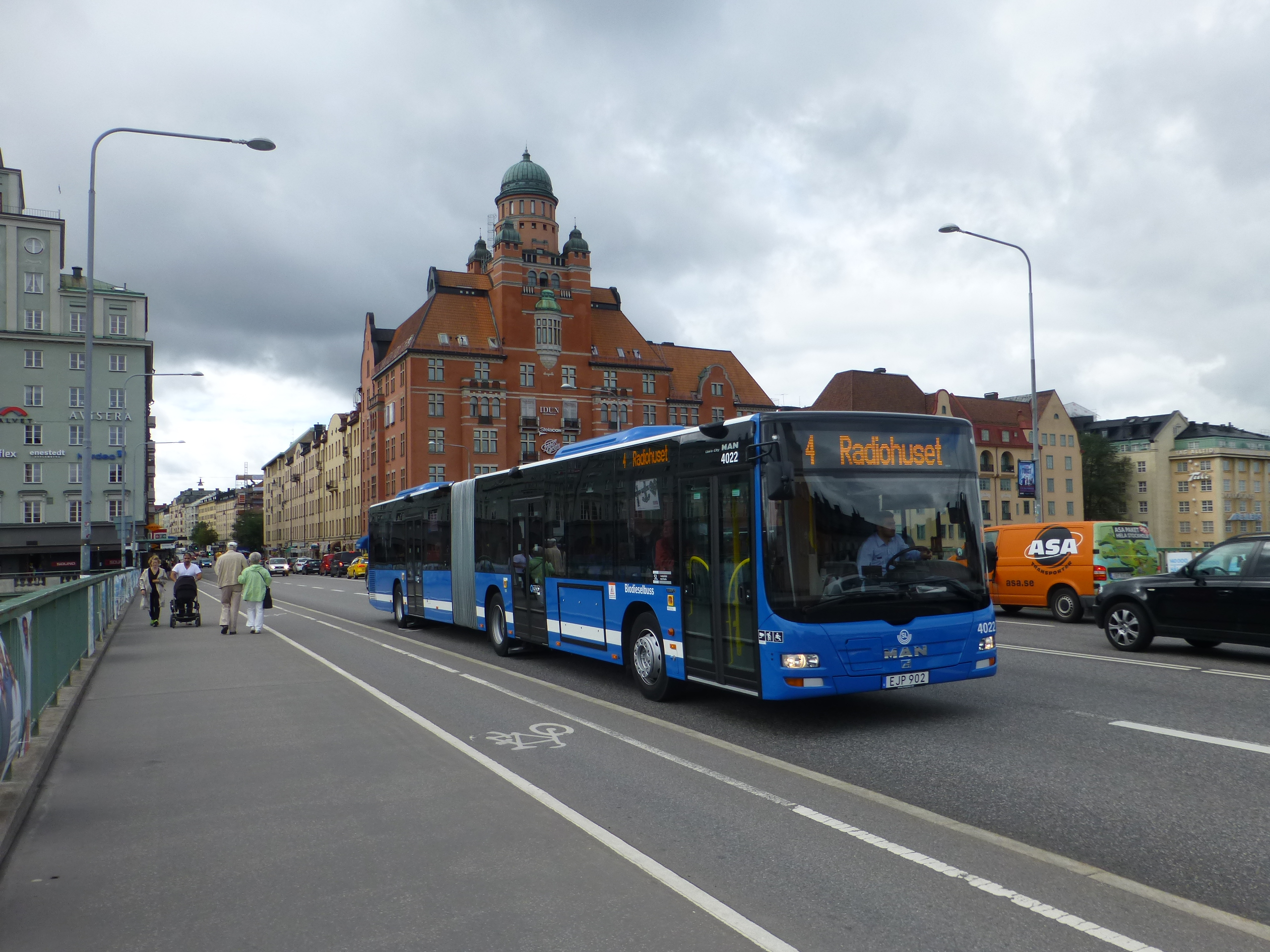
A-buses are partially inspired by Stockholm's "blue buses".

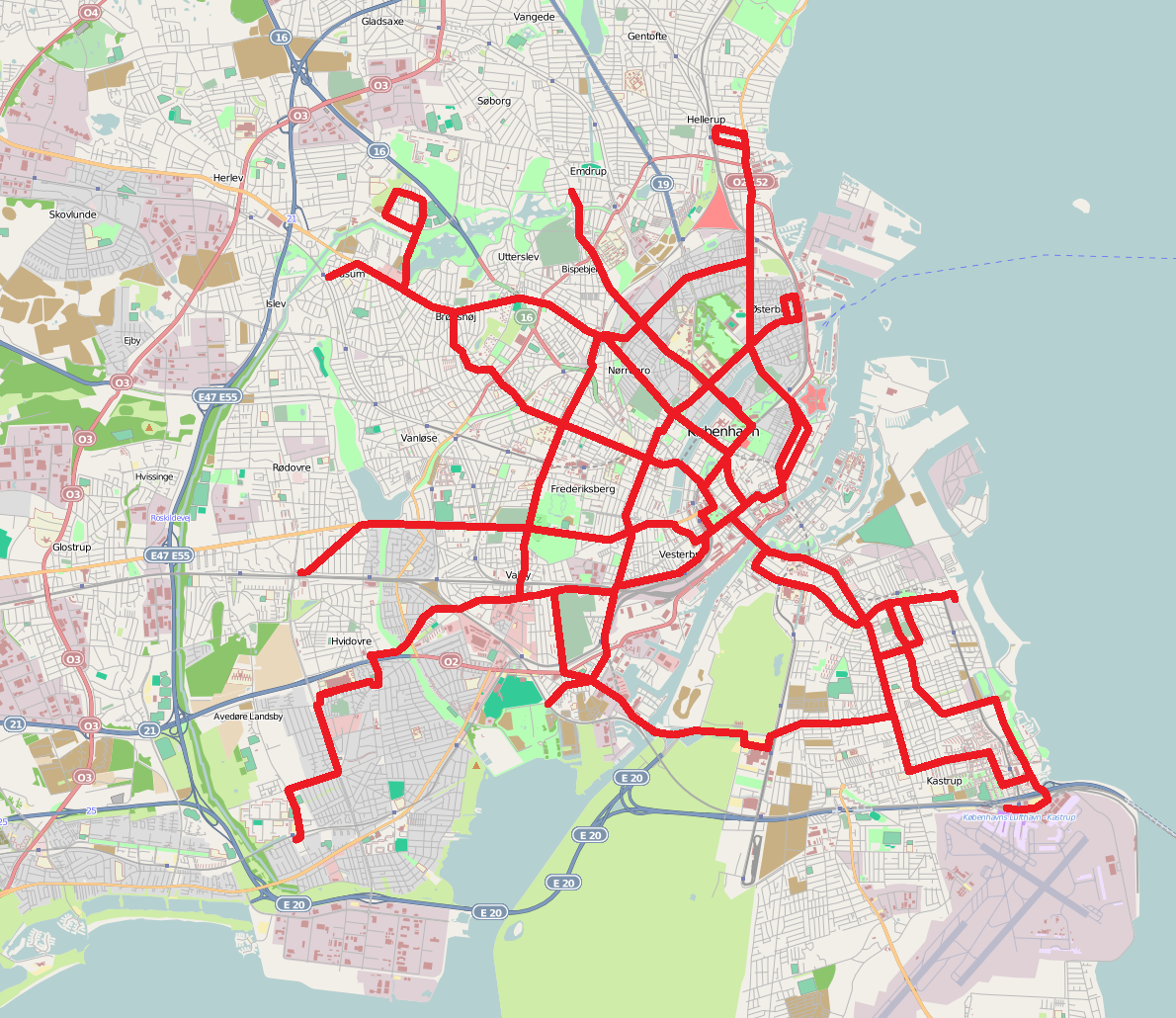
First draft of the A-bus network, April 2000. Changes were made to some routes, especially on Amager.

The early plans for the A-buses came along with the establishment of the Copenhagen Metro which opened in stages in 2002–3, and which also led to a series of changes and reductions to the existing bus network. The network had been largely unchanged from the time of the conversion of the tramways in the 1960s, though there were a series of minor and more major changes including the introduction of S-buses throughout the 1990s. The expectation was, however, that 300,000 vehicle hours would be saved per year with the Metro in service. There was a danger that these changes could be seen as one-sided cuts to the bus service, especially as areas outside of the Metro coverage would be affected.

The 1998 Transit Plan for the Capital Region of Denmark outlined a simplification of the bus service in central districts. A network consisting of S-buses, supplemented by local services, was to be gradually built up. With a 10-minute service as the basis, it was estimated that it would create an easy-to-understand and attractive basic network.

In the autumn of 1999, HUR Trafik (HT) prepared a paper on a new bus network in the Copenhagen and Frederiksberg Municipalities, that could be operational by the time of the opening of the Metro in October 2002. This was followed in spring 2000 by a concrete proposal to HT's board of directors. It referred to, amongst other things, HT's own experience with S-buses that had resulted in high customer satisfaction. Furthermore, it also referred to BRT systems that had been introduced in other cities. For example, in Stockholm the "blue bus" routes were popularly referred to as "the street metro". Similarly, Jönköping successfully set up two similar services in 1996 which served the busiest travel routes with direct bus links. Both cities also supplemented these with different local routes.

=== Beginning of the A-bus service ===
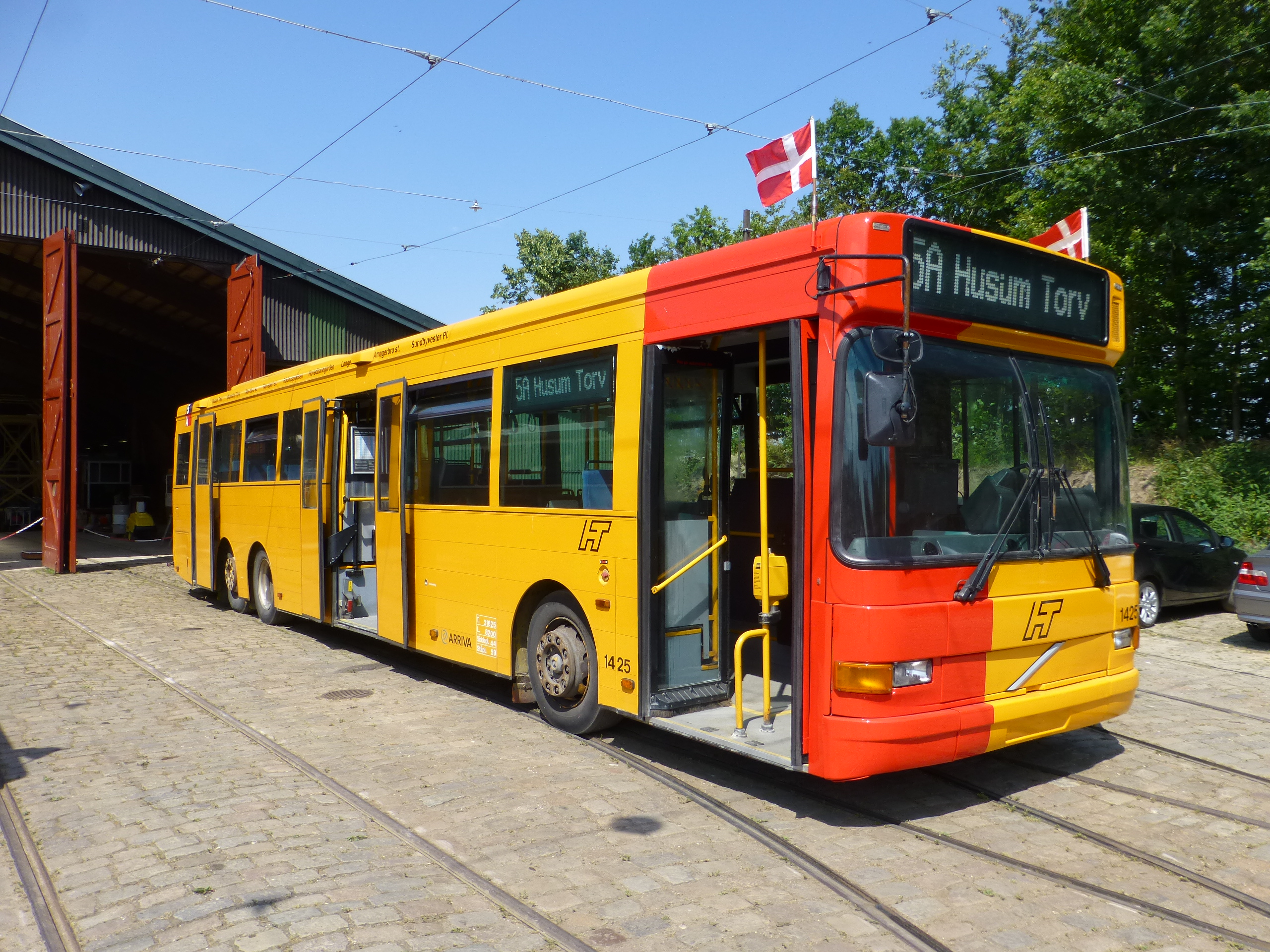
One of the first buses on line 5A, now at the Danish Tramway Museum

The opening of the A-bus service took place on Sunday, October 20, 2002, with the 2A and 5A as the first lines opening after the official inauguration of the first stage of the Metro between Nørreport and Vestamager/Lergravsparken the day before. At the same time, a number of other lines were changed, especially on Amager, where the one hundred year old lines 2, 5 and 9 were discontinued and replaced with the 2A and 5A. A-buses also replaced the more recent lines 4E and 11.

There was a public information campaign in the weeks before and after the introduction of the A-buses. Magazines were sent out to homes near A-bus stops, and subscribers to the HUR Trafik customer information programme HT Linieinfo were informed about the A-buses through letters and emails. Furthermore, posters were put up in buses, and, in the first four weeks of the service, ten A-buses were decorated with campaign materials. Older buses from the Skjoldenæsholm Tram Museum were deployed for the final day of the old line 5 service on October 19, 2002. A few days later, the official inauguration of the A-bus service was made by HUR chairman Mads Lebech at an event which took place at Rådhuspladsen on October 21, 2002.

=== A-bus concept spreads beyond Copenhagen ===
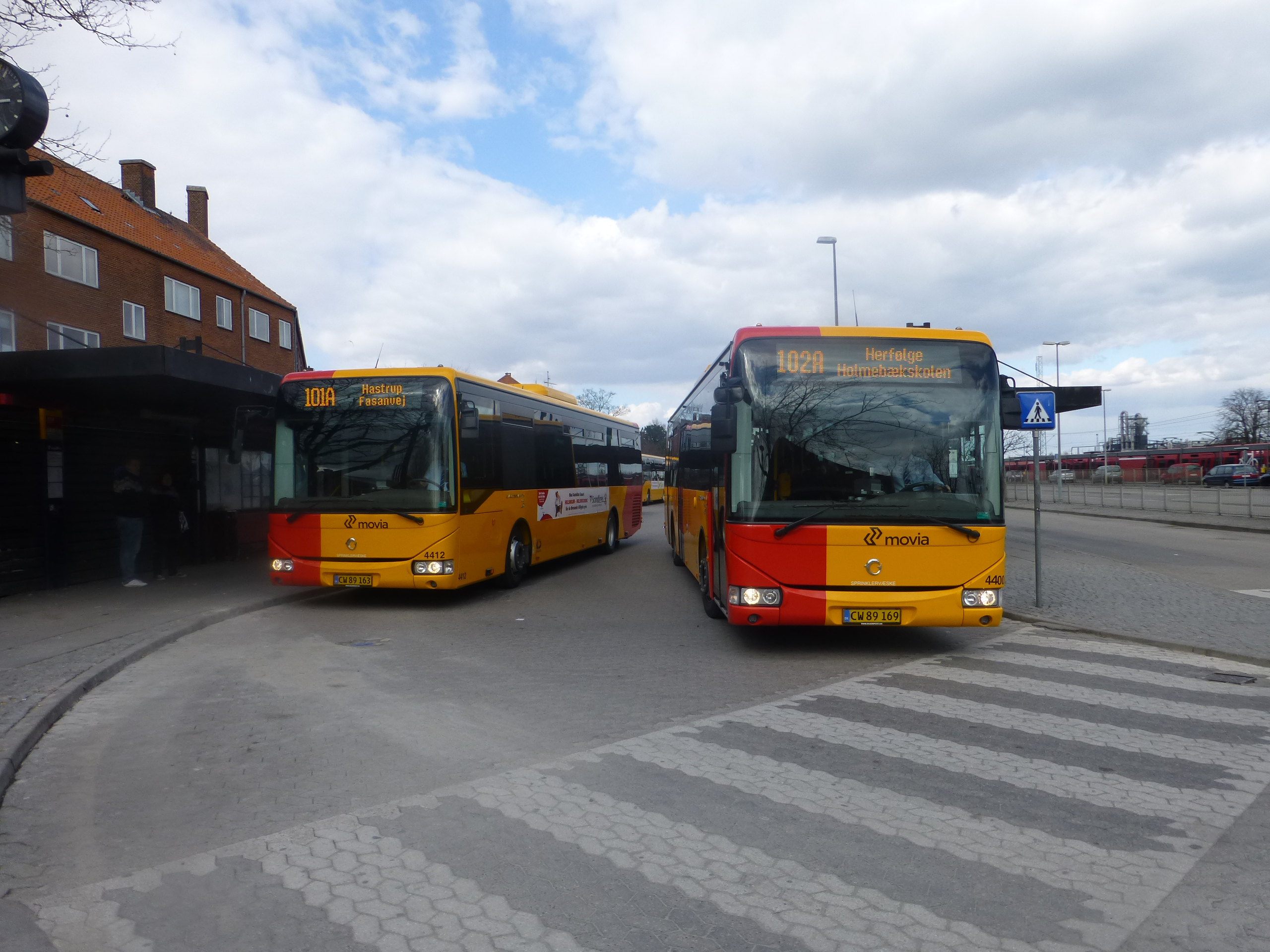
Lines 101A and 102A at Køge Station, 2013

With the structural reforms (Strukturreformen) that came into effect on January 1, 2007, the Greater Copenhagen Authority was disbanded. HUR Trafik, a division of the Greater Copenhagen Authority, was merged with two other transit agencies (Vestsjællands Trafikselskab and Storstrøms Trafikselskab) to form Movia.

By 2008, they were able to show the A-buses were a success. In the first 6 months of 2008, there were 2.5% more passengers on A-bus routes compared with the first 6 months of 2007, this was also happening at a time when passenger numbers in general were falling. Per Gellert, Movia's business development manager concluded that: "A-buses are meeting customers' desires for simplicity, many departures and up-to-date departure information. Armed with this knowledge of their popularity, we clearly hope to transfer this concept to other bus lines." It was unclear though, at that point, how this would happen. On the other hand, it was noted that the announcement was reminiscent of the success of the S-buses in the 1990s, which were similarly characterised by many departures, simple routes and an accurate information flow.

The expansion of the concept to other parts of the country came when 6 towns on Zealand introduced A-bus routes between 2009 and 2011. The first of these was the line 401A in Ringsted, which began service December 13, 2009. With a bus running every 15 minutes, the frequency of the service was and remains lower than that of Copenhagen; however, this frequency is high compared to similar local routes.

The concept also spread to Aarhus; Midttrafik set up 6 A-bus lines after a complete restructuring of the city bus network in 2011. The Aarhus A-bus system is, however, slightly different from the one on Zealand. One main difference is that the A-buses do not call at stops that other services also stop at. Originally, the buses also had the same red corner as the ones on Zealand, but these were gradually removed in 2014, and were completely gone by 2015.

=== New City Network ===
After many years under construction, the City Circle Line of the Copenhagen Metro was opened on September 29, 2019. It largely followed line 1A's previous route between Enghave Plads and Poul Henningsens Plads and weaved in and out of line 8A's route for the rest. On the way, it also intersects all the other A-bus routes; furthermore, other regular bus routes were also affected to varying degrees. Therefore, Movia introduced sweeping changes to the Copenhagen bus network on October 13, 2019, which they call the New City Network (Nyt Bynet). The basis for the changes was made in connection with the 2016 Transport Plan (Trafikplan 2016), which was approved by Movia's board of directors on February 23, 2017. The plans subsequently became more concrete with the presentation of the New City Network in January 2018, with only a few further changes.

=== Electric articulated buses ===
In December 2019, electric articulated buses were introduced on line 2A, with charging points at the final stops on the route. Some attempts were made to introduce them to line 3A, however, it was only on the 2A that all the buses were changed. The background to this was a decision from the Copenhagen City Council that, from 2019 onwards, there should be a requirement to offer environmentally friendly public transport such as electric buses. The choice of articulated buses was made to provide greater capacity on individual buses and thus make it possible to reduce the total number of buses running.

== The A-bus Network ==
| Line | Opened | Route | Notes |
|---|---|---|---|
| 1A | May 25, 2003 | Hellerup Station – Svanemøllen station – Trianglen Station – Rigshospitalet – Stengade – H.C. Ørsteds Vej – Enghave Plads Station – Carlsberg station – Toftegårds Plads – Ny Ellebjerg station – Hvidovre Hospital – Avedøre station | Hvidovre Hospital – Avedøre Station are only served by every other departure during the day and the evening, and only once an hour at night. |
| 2A | October 20, 2002 | Tingbjerg, Gavlhusvej – Brønshøj Torv – Grøndal station – Aksel Møllers Have Station – Forum Station – Rådhuspladsen – Hovedbanegården – Christiansborg Slotsplads – Christianshavn Station – Refshaleøen | In the evenings, 3 departures go to the Opera instead of Refshaleøen. |
| 4A | December 14, 2003 | Buddinge station – Høje Gladsaxe – Emdrup Torv – Nørrebro station – Fasanvej Station – Valby station – Toftegårds Plads – Ny Ellebjerg station – Friheden station | Buddinge Station – Emdrup Torv are only served by every other departure during rush hour and the evenings, and only once an hour at night. |
| 6A | May 25, 2003 | Buddinge station – Søborg Torv – Emdrup Torv – Bispebjerg station – Rigshospitalet – Nørreport Station | Buddinge Station – Emdrup Torv are only served by every other departure during the day and the evening, and only once an hour at night. |
| 7A | October 13, 2019 | Rødovrehallen – Damhustorvet – Ålholm station – Frederiksberg Allé Station – Hovedbanegården – Fisketorvet – Teglholmen – Mozarts Plads – Sjælør station – Ny Ellebjerg station | |
| 9A | March 24, 2013 | Glostrup station – Rødovre Centrum – Jyllingevej station – Vanløse Station – Flintholm Station – Peter Bangs Vej station – Frederiksberg Allé Station – Carlsberg station – Sydhavn station – Mozarts Plads – Kongens Enghave, Valbyparken | Glostrup Station – Rødovre Centrum are only served by every other departure in the evenings. At night, Glostrup Station – Jyllingevej/Ålekistevej are only served once an hour. |

=== Discontinued lines ===
| Line | Opened | Discontinued | Route at time of discontinuation | Notes |
|---|---|---|---|---|
| 3A | December 14, 2003 | October 13, 2019 | Nordhavn station – Trianglen – Rigshospitalet – Stengade – H.C. Ørsteds Vej – Enghave Plads – Sydhavn station – Mozarts Plads – Kongens Enghave, Valbyparken | |
| 5A | October 20, 2002 | April 23, 2017 | Husum Torv – Brønshøj Torv – Bellahøj – Nørrebro station – Nørrebrogade – Nørreport Station – Rådhuspladsen – Hovedbanegården – Amagerbro Station – Sundbyvester Plads – Korsvejen – Copenhagen Airport | Integrated with Cityline, line 5C. Sundbyvester Plads – Lufthavnen were only served by every third departure Monday-Saturday. On Sundays and public holidays they were only served by every fourth departure during the day, and every other departure in the evening. At night, Sundbyvester Plads – Lufthavnen were only served once an hour. |
| 8A | March 29, 2015 | October 13, 2019 | Nordhavn station – Poul Henningsens Plads – Vibenshus Runddel – Nørrebros Runddel – Frederiksberg Station – Frederiksberg Rådhus – Valby station – Ny Ellebjerg station – Åmarken station – Friheden station | |
| 11A | October 24, 2010 | January 1, 2015 | Tivoli Hotel – Hovedbanegården – Nytorv – Nørreport Station – Kongens Nytorv Station – Nyhavn, Havnebusserne | Served by small electric buses. |

== Passenger Numbers ==
The seven A-bus lines which existed in 2018 had a total of 58 million passengers that year. The most used line was the 1A with 10.9 million passengers, while line 3A was the least used with only 5 million passengers. In comparison, across all of Movia's services, there were 207.7 million passengers in 2018, of which the Copenhagen A-buses accounted for 27.9% of the total. In 2019, the seven, and later six A-buses, had a total of 52.9 million passengers. Movia's total number of passengers for all their services in 2019 was 198.2 million, of which the Copenhagen A-buses accounted for 26.7% of the total. The fall in passenger numbers for both A-buses and Movia's services in general should be viewed against the background of the opening of the City Circle Line on September 29, 2019.

| Line | 2016 | 2017 | 2018 | 2019 |
|---|---|---|---|---|
| 1A | 10,807,802 | 11,432,764 | 10,875,740 | 9,801,313 |
| 2A | 8,737,434 | 8,588,839 | 8,051,537 | 8,015,917 |
| 3A | 4,969,234 | 5,046,775 | 4,999,350 | 3,609,072 |
| 4A | 9,884,947 | 10,131,555 | 10,066,061 | 9,163,128 |
| 5A | 19,443,516 | – | – | – |
| 6A | 11,123,262 | 10,440,447 | 9,915,034 | 9,196,644 |
| 7A | – | – | – | 1,198,608 |
| 8A | 6,525,374 | 6,716,936 | 6,538,518 | 5,163,844 |
| 9A | 6,611,074 | 7,197,072 | 7,572,268 | 6,771,766 |
| Total | 78,102,644 | 59,554,388 | 58,018,508 | 52,920,290 |

== Sources ==
- Forslag til stambusnet i København, Trafikdage på Aalborg Universitet, 2000 from Internet Archives Wayback Machine (archived April 3, 2016)
- Forslag til stambusplan – sammenfatning, Hovedstadens Udviklingsråd, 2001. ISBN 87-90269-58-6
- Timetables, transit plans and various other releases by HUR Trafik and Movia.
- Ongoing overviews of line changes in Busfronten, member magazine of the association Busfronten. ISSN 0907-2810
- A-busserne fylder 10 år, Jesper Kiby Denborg. Busfronten 245/2012, pp. 3–14.
- HT-nyt, from 2003 TrafikNyt, staff magazine for HUR Trafik and its contractors.
