= Boulevard Line =

Railway line in Denmark

Coordinates: 55°41′06″N 12°34′24″E

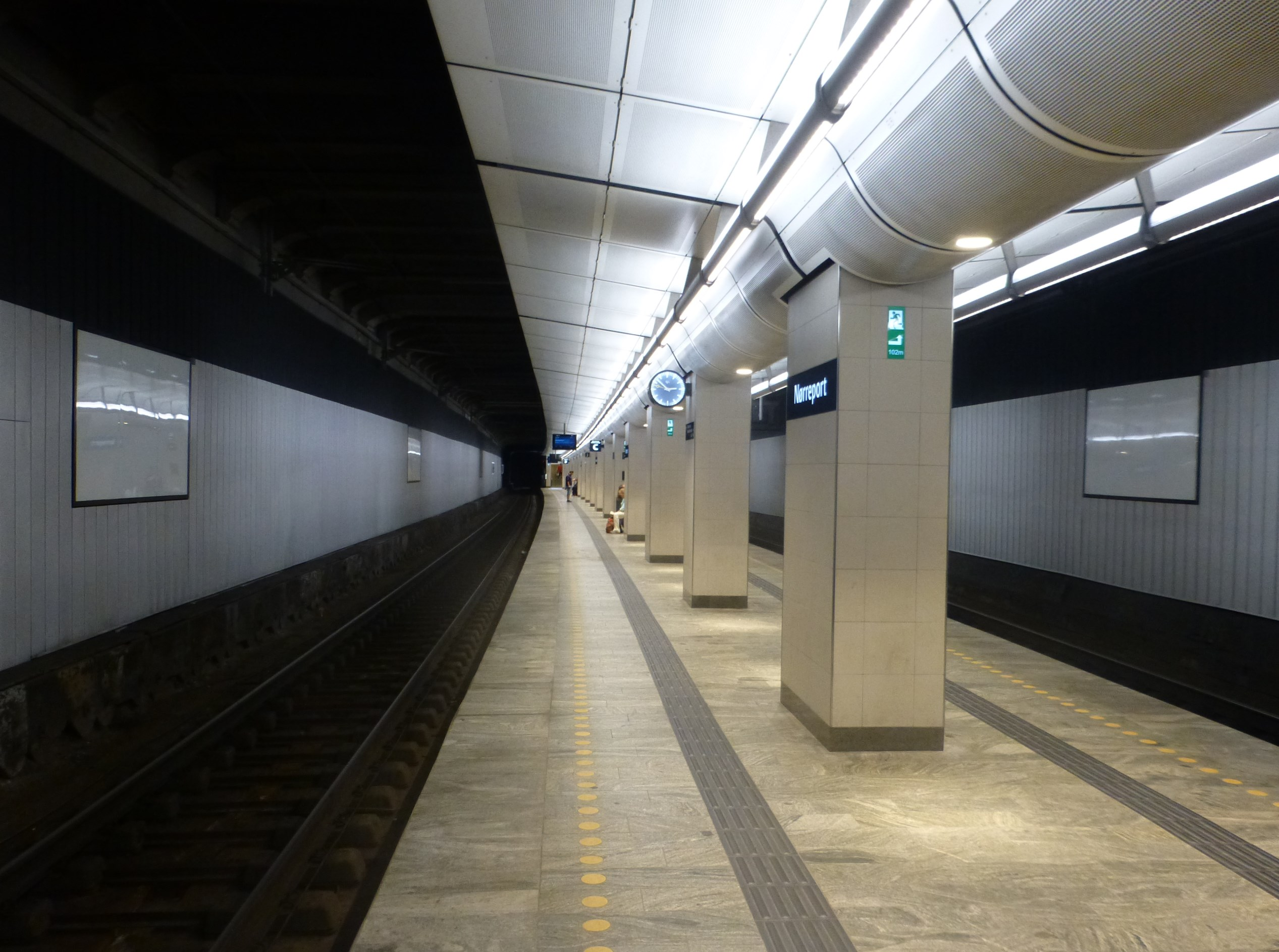
- The main line platform at Nørreport Station on the Boulevard Line in 2015.

Overview
- Other name: 'Røret'
- Native name: Boulevardbanen
- Status: Active
- Owner: Banedanmark
- Termini: passing through; passing through
- Stations: 7 (S-train), 3 (all trains)

Service
- Type: Main line Regional rail IC & IC Express; S-train
- System: Danish railways
- Operator(s): DSB

History
- Opened: 1 December 1917

Technical
- Line length: 3.2 kilometres (2.0 mi)
- Number of tracks: Quadruple
- Character: Passenger trains
- Track gauge: 1,435 mm (4 ft 8 1/2 in)
- Electrification: Overhead catenary (S-trains use DC power other trains use AC power or diesel)
- Operating speed: 60 km/h (37 mph) (mainline); 80 km/h (50 mph) (S-train)

The Boulevard Line (Danish: Boulevardbanen) is a 3.2-kilometer (2.0 mi) long partly underground railway between Copenhagen Central Station and Østerport Station in Copenhagen, Denmark. The quadruple track railway carries today one dual track for the Copenhagen S-train system and another dual track for the mainline railway and regional trains. The line has two intermediate stations, Vesterport Station and Nørreport Station. It continues above ground to Nordhavn station and at Svanemøllen station the tracks separate towards either Ryparken station or Hellerup station. Dybbølsbro station is also located along this railway, located just a bit south of Copenhagen Central. Out of the four main S-train branches, three follow this path, between Dybbølsbro and Svanemøllen (with at least four tracks). Only at Copenhagen Central, Nørreport and Østerport do all trains stop. While Dybbølsbro, Vesterport, Nordhavn and Svanemøllen all are S-train stations only. (Nørreport also has Metro service, just as the Central Station, Østerport and Nordhavn have since 2019).

== History ==
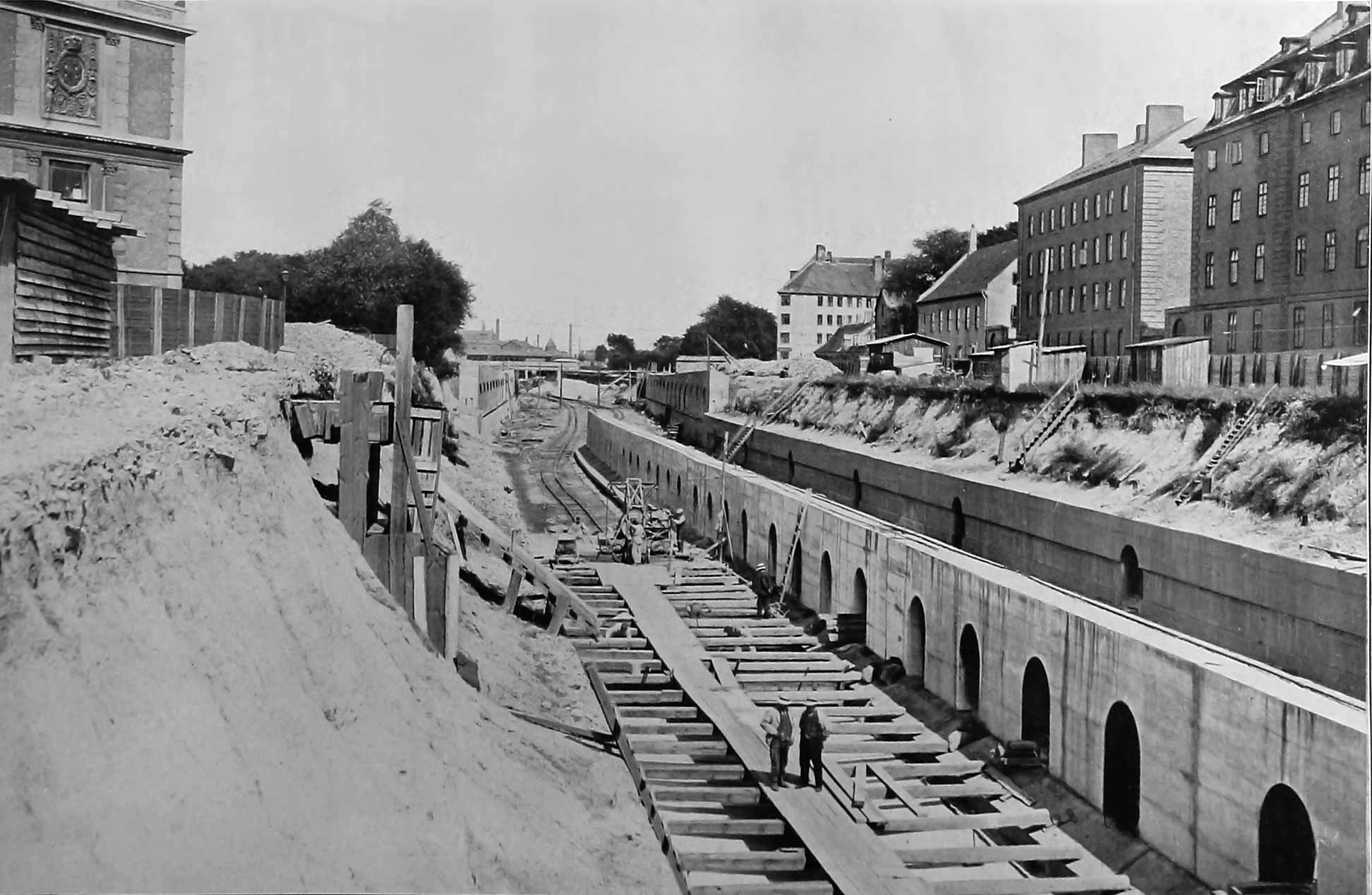
Construction of the Boulevard Line between Sølvgade and Stokhusgade in 1914

It opened in 1917, allowing services on the Coast Line and the Klampenborg Line to extend to Copenhagen Central Station. The line became part of the S-train network on 15 May 1934.

== See also ==
- List of railway lines in Denmark
- Rail transport in Denmark
- History of rail transport in Denmark
