= KB Hallen railway station =

Commuter railway station in Copenhagen, Denmark

KB Hallen
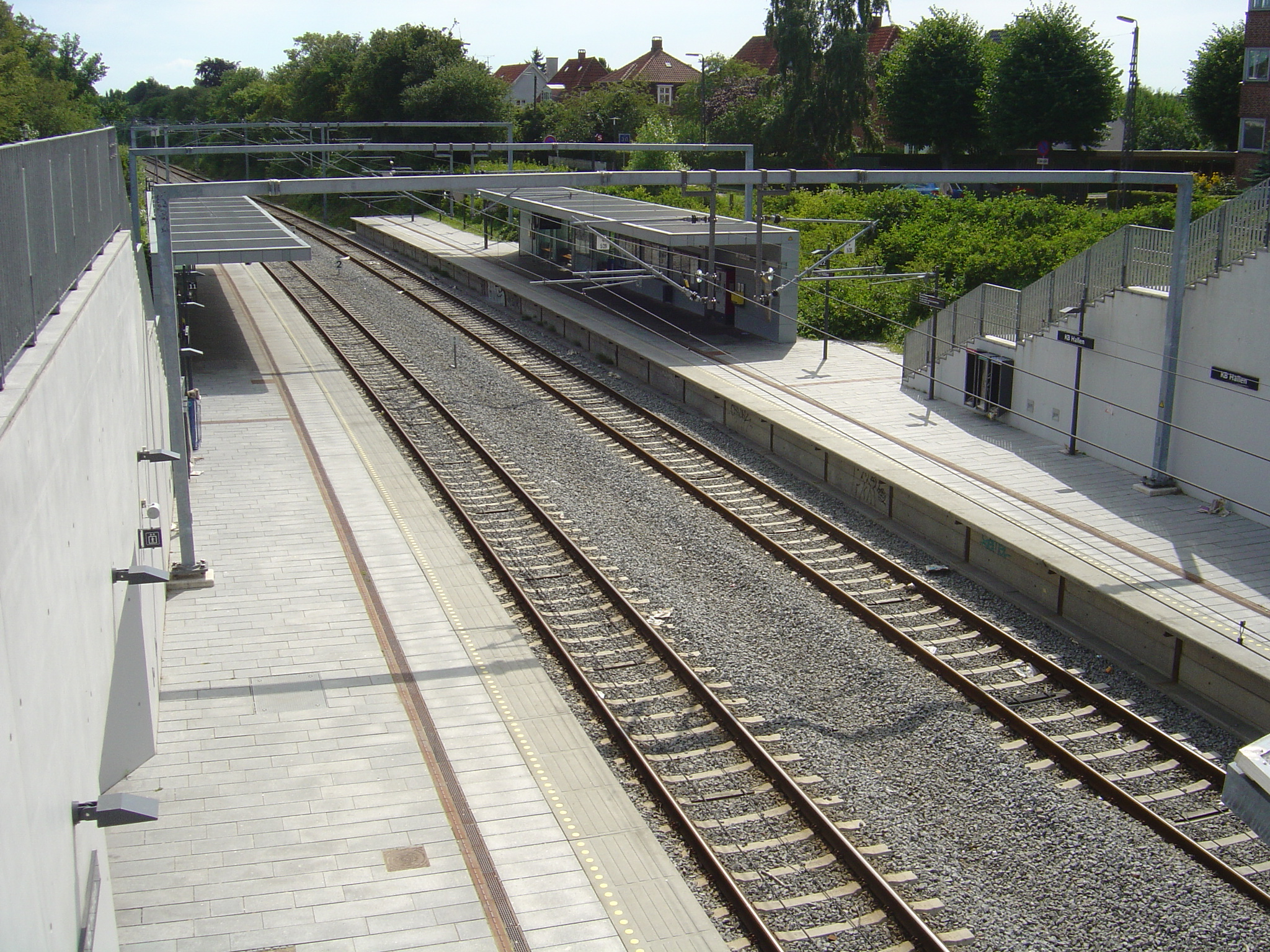
- KB Hallen station in 2007

General information
- Location: Peter Bangs Vej 163A; 2000 Frederiksberg; Frederiksberg Municipality; Denmark
- Coordinates: 55°40′40″N 12°29′32.4″E
- Elevation: 14.3 metres (47 ft)
- Owner: DSB (station infrastructure); Banedanmark (rail infrastructure)
- Platforms: 2
- Tracks: 2
- Train operators: DSB

Construction
- Accessible: Yes

Other information
- Station code: Kbn
- Fare zone: 2

History
- Opened: 8 January 2005; 21 years ago

Services
Preceding station	S-train	Following station
Ålholm towards Copenhagen South	F	Flintholm towards Hellerup
Location

KB Hallen station is an S-train station serving the western part of Frederiksberg in Copenhagen, Denmark. The station is located on the Ring Line of Copenhagen's S-train network.

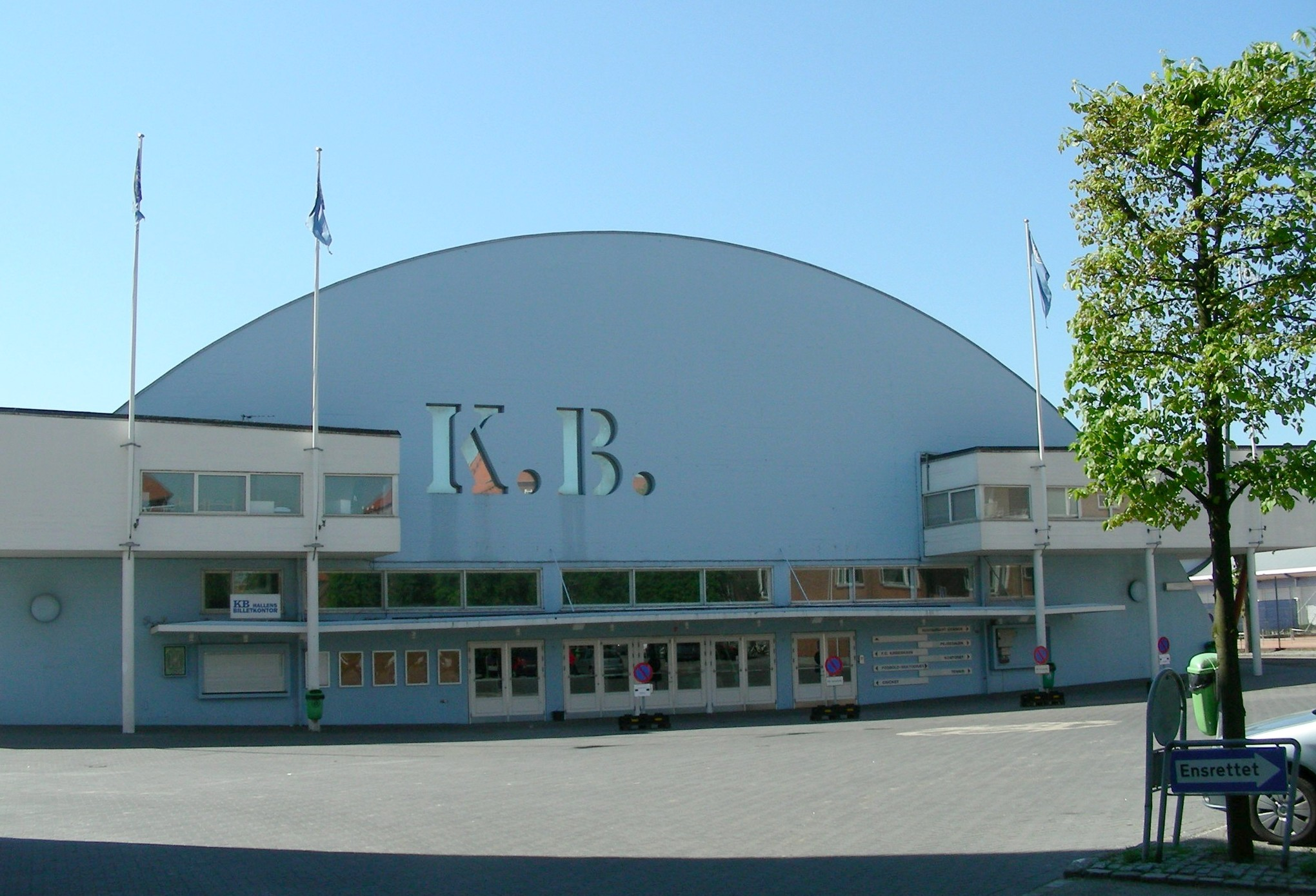
The nearby K.B. Hallen multi-purpose venue, after which the station is named

== See also ==
- List of Copenhagen S-train stations
- List of railway stations in Denmark
