= Fuglebakken =

Fuglebakken may refer to three locations, all in Denmark:

- Fuglebakken, Frederiksberg, a neighborhood in Copenhagen
- Fuglebakken station, a train station in Copenhagen
- Fuglebakken, a neighborhood in Aarhus V
