= Grøndal railway station =

Commuter railway station in Copenhagen, Denmark

Grøndal
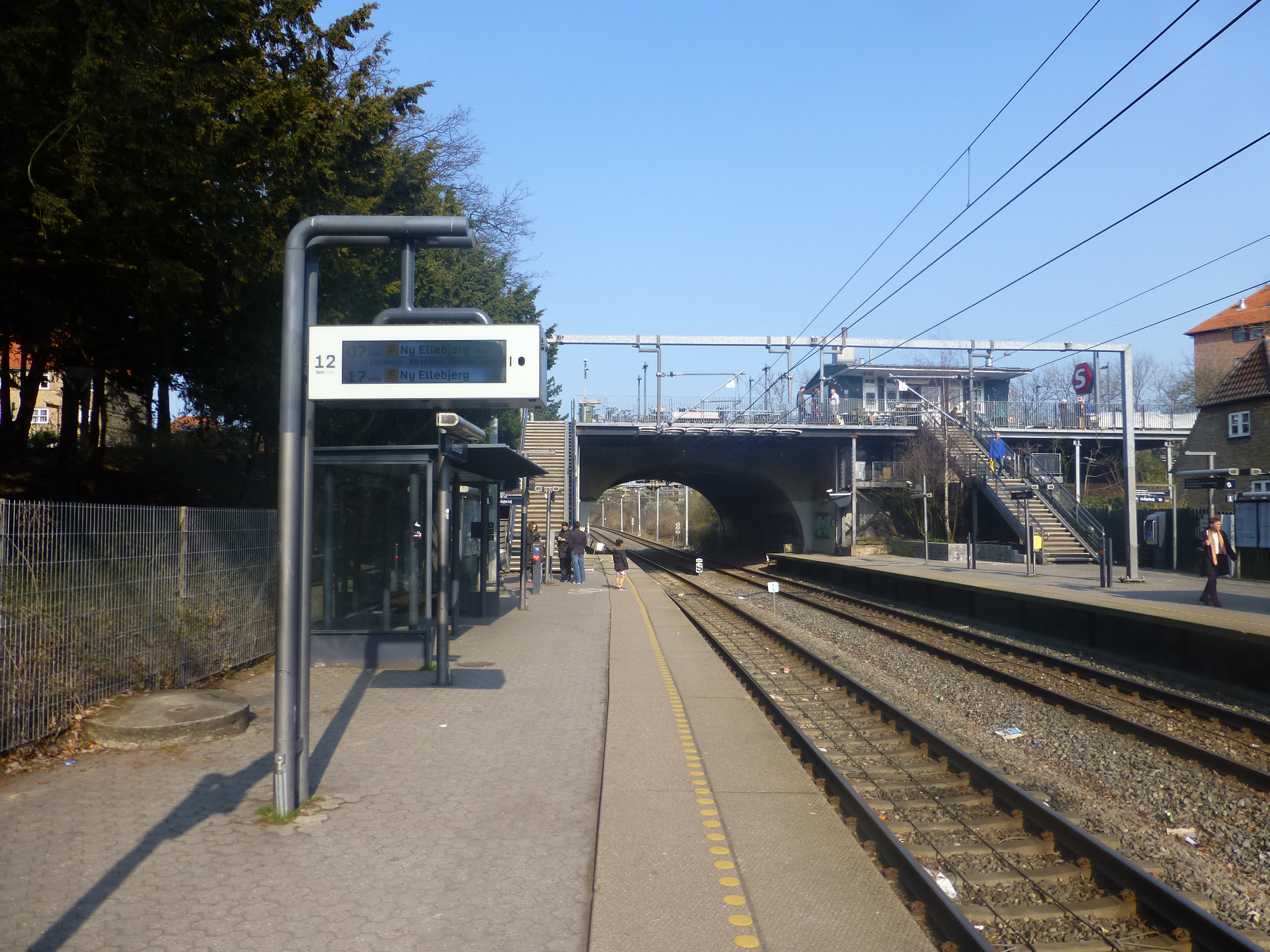
- Grøndal station in 2014

General information
- Location: Godthåbsvej 173; 2720 Vanløse; Copenhagen Municipality; Denmark
- Coordinates: 55°41′26″N 12°30′56″E
- Elevation: 14.2 metres (47 ft)
- Owner: DSB (station infrastructure); Banedanmark (rail infrastructure)
- Platforms: 2 side platforms
- Tracks: 2
- Train operators: DSB

Other information
- Station code: Ght
- Fare zone: 2

History
- Opened: 15 May 1930; 96 years ago
- Rebuilt: 3 April 1934 (S-train)
- Electrified: 1934 (S-train)
- Former names: Godthåbsvej

Services
Preceding station	S-train	Following station
Flintholm towards Copenhagen South	F	Fuglebakken towards Hellerup
Location

Grøndal station (Danish pronunciation: [ˈkʁɶnˌtɛˀl stæˈɕoˀn], previously called Godthåbsvej station) is an S-train station serving the neighbourhood of Grøndal in the district of Vanløse in Copenhagen, Denmark. The station is located on the Ring Line of Copenhagen's S-train network.

== See also ==
- List of Copenhagen S-train stations
- List of railway stations in Denmark
