= Nørrebro railway station =

Commuter and rapid transit railway station in Copenhagen, Denmark

Nørrebro
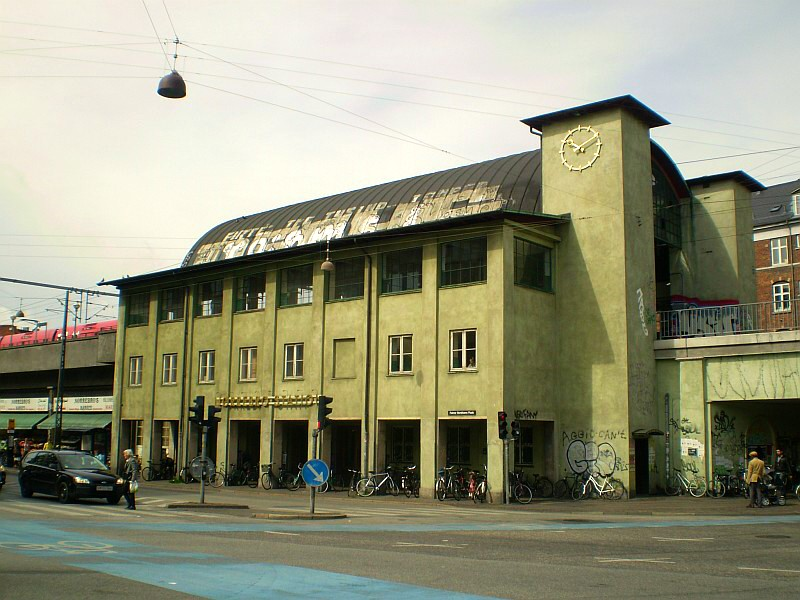
- Nørrebro station in 2009

General information
- Location: Nørrebrogade 253; Copenhagen N Copenhagen Municipality; Denmark
- Coordinates: 55°42′02″N 12°32′16″E
- Elevation: 11.9 metres (39 ft)
- Owner: DSB (station infrastructure); Banedanmark (rail infrastructure)
- Platforms: 2 side platforms (S-train), 1 island platform (Metro)
- Tracks: 4 (2 S-train, 2 Metro)
- Train operators: DSB
- Bus routes: 12, 4A, 5C, 250S, 350S

Construction
- Structure type: Elevated (S-train); Underground (Metro)
- Accessible: Yes
- Architect: Knud Tanggaard Seest

Other information
- Station code: Nø
- Fare zone: 2

History
- Opened: 15 May 1930; 96 years ago
- Rebuilt: 3 April 1934 (S-train)
- Electrified: 1934 (S-train)

Services
Preceding station	S-train	Following station
Fuglebakken towards Copenhagen South	F	Bispebjerg towards Hellerup
Preceding station	Copenhagen Metro	Following station
Skjolds Plads clockwise	M3	Nørrebros Runddel counter-clockwise
Location

Nørrebro station is an interchange station between the S-train Ring Line and the Copenhagen Metro City Circle Line in the Outer Nørrebro district of Copenhagen, Denmark. It is situated at the junction of Nørrebrogade, Folmer Bendtsens Plads, Frederikssundsvej and Nordre Fasanvej. The functionalist station building from 1930 designed by the architect Knud Tanggaard Seest was listed on the Danish registry of protected buildings and places in 1992.

== History ==
The first station at the site was opened on 1 July 1886. The current station opened on 15 May 1930. The metro station was opened on 29 September 2019 together with 16 other stations on the line.

== Design ==
The functionalist station building from 1940 was designed by the Danish architect Knud Tanggaard Seest who was the head architect of the Danish State Railways from 1922 to 1949. The building was listed on the Danish registry of protected buildings and places in 1992.

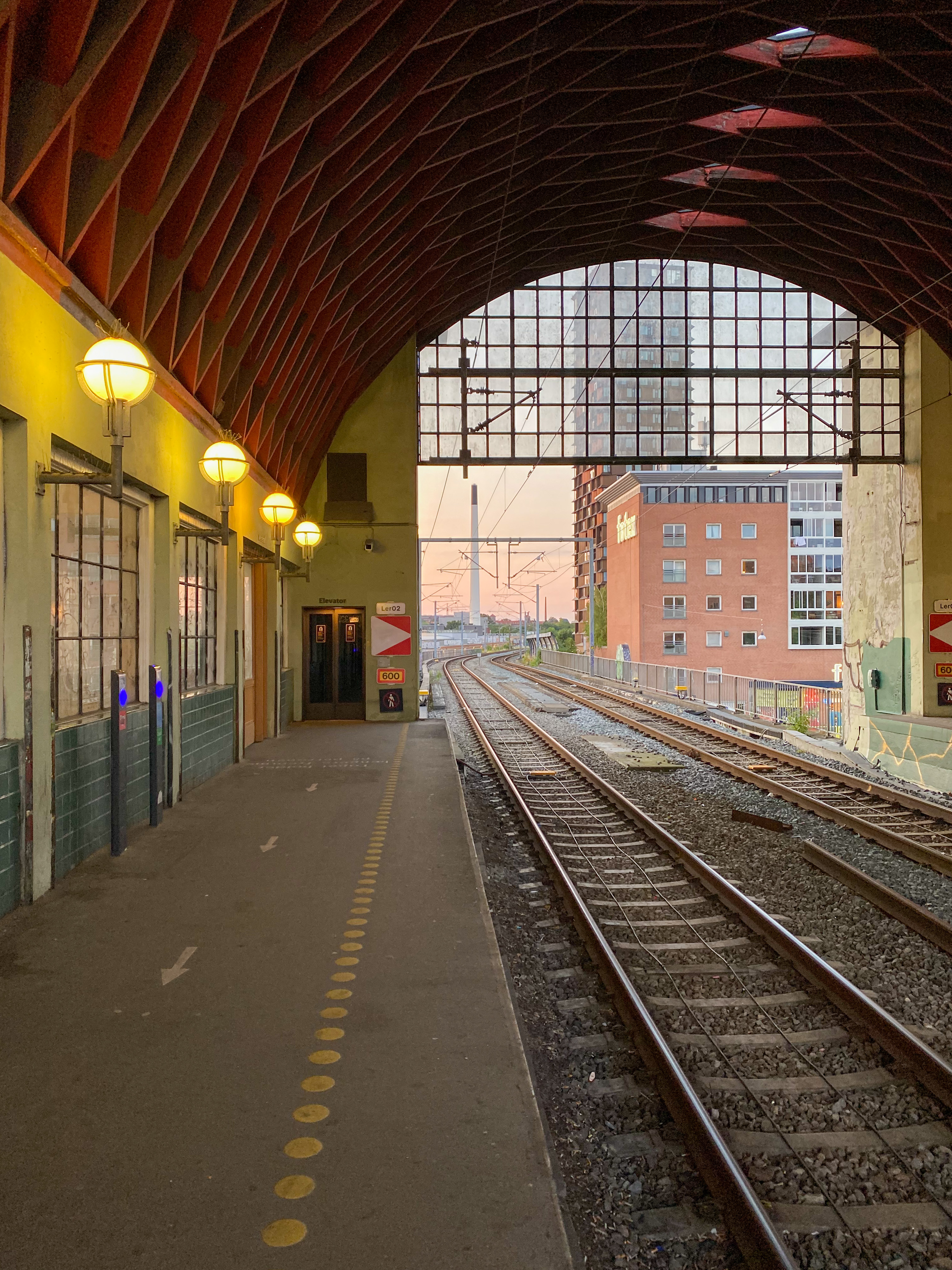
Nørrebro Station platform looking towards Nordbro Tårnet

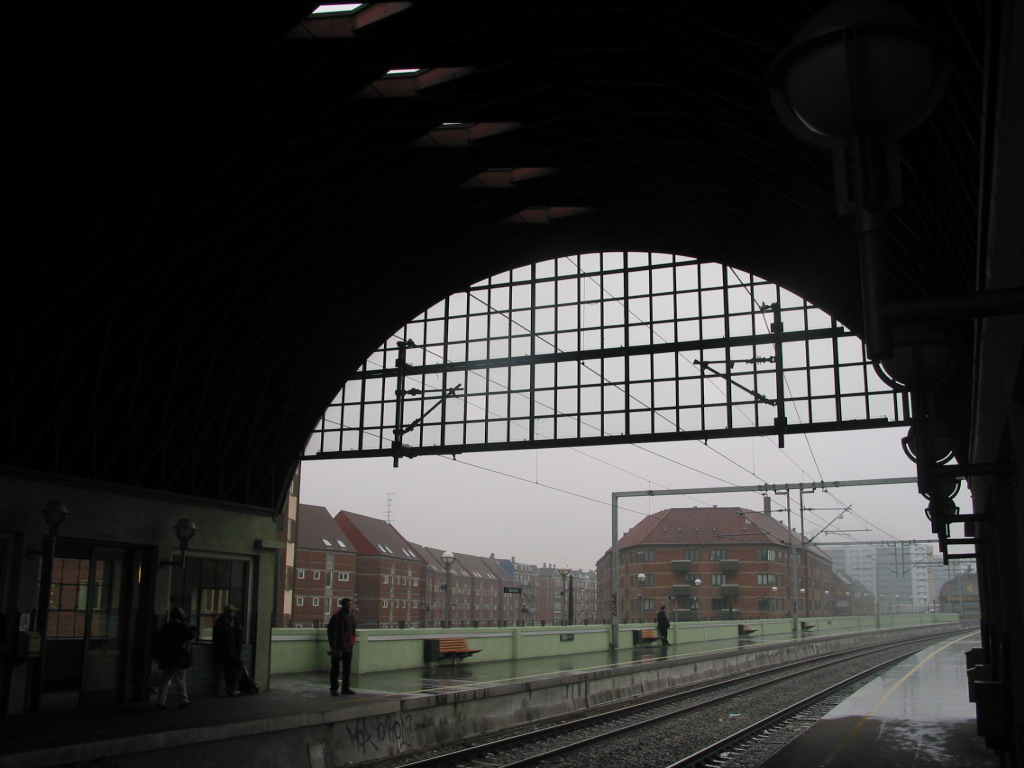
Station seen from one platform under the large curved roof

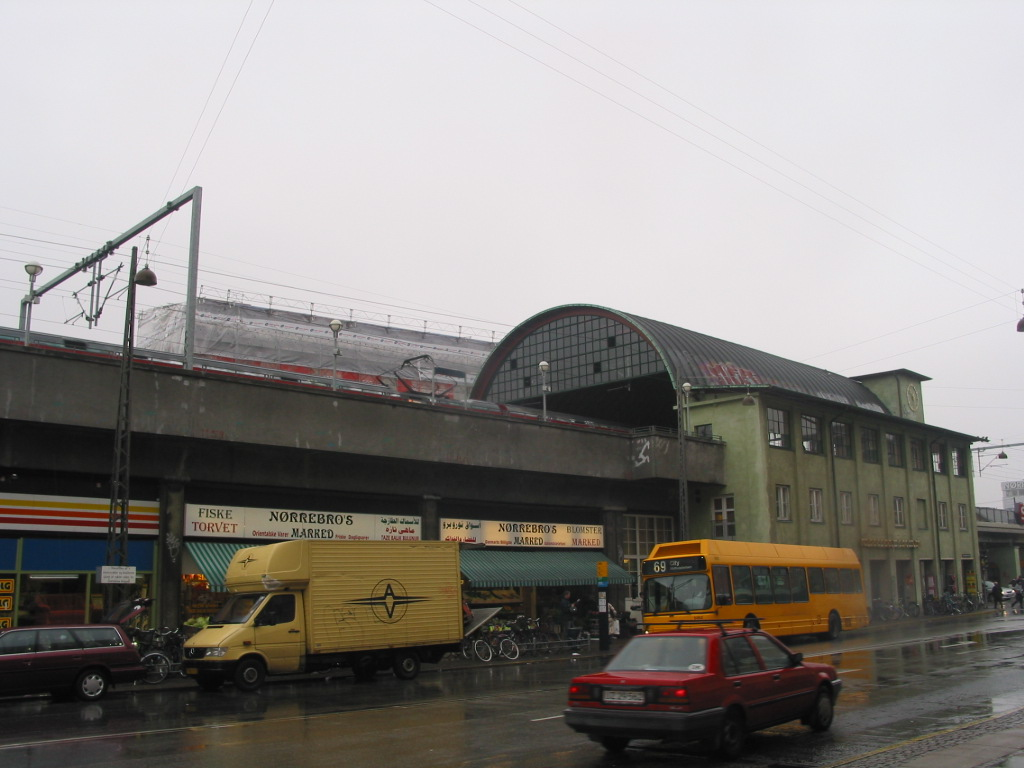
Station from the other side

== See also ==
- List of Copenhagen Metro stations
- List of Copenhagen S-train stations
- List of railway stations in Denmark
