= Ålholm station =

Commuter railway station in Copenhagen, Denmark

Ålholm
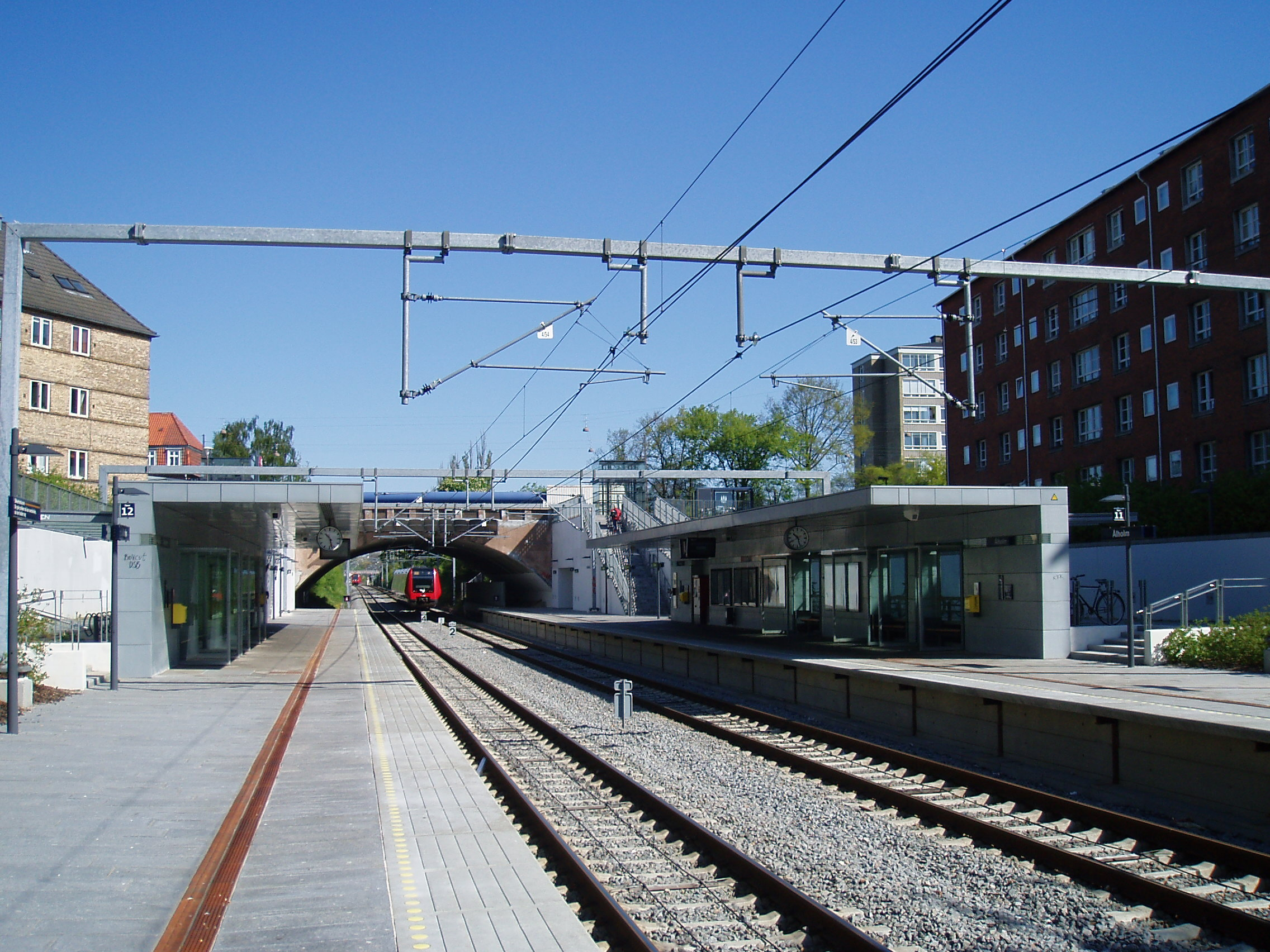
- Ålholm station in 2007

General information
- Location: 131 Roskildevej; 2500 Valby; Copenhagen Municipality; Denmark
- Coordinates: 55°40′19″N 12°29′35.5″E
- Elevation: 6.6 metres (22 ft)
- Owner: DSB (station infrastructure); Banedanmark (rail infrastructure)
- Platforms: 2 side platforms
- Tracks: 2
- Train operators: DSB

Other information
- Station code: Ålm
- Fare zone: 2

History
- Opened: 8 January 2005; 21 years ago

Services
Preceding station	S-train	Following station
Danshøj towards Copenhagen South	F	KB Hallen towards Hellerup
Location

Ålholm station is a commuter rail railway station serving the northwestern part of the district of Valby in Copenhagen, Denmark. It is located on the Ring Line of Copenhagen's S-train network. The station opened on 8 January 2005 where Roskildevej crosses the railway line.

== See also ==
- List of Copenhagen S-train stations
- List of railway stations in Denmark
- Rail transport in Denmark
- Transport in Copenhagen
