= Bispebjerg railway station =

Commuter railway station in Copenhagen, Denmark

Bispebjerg
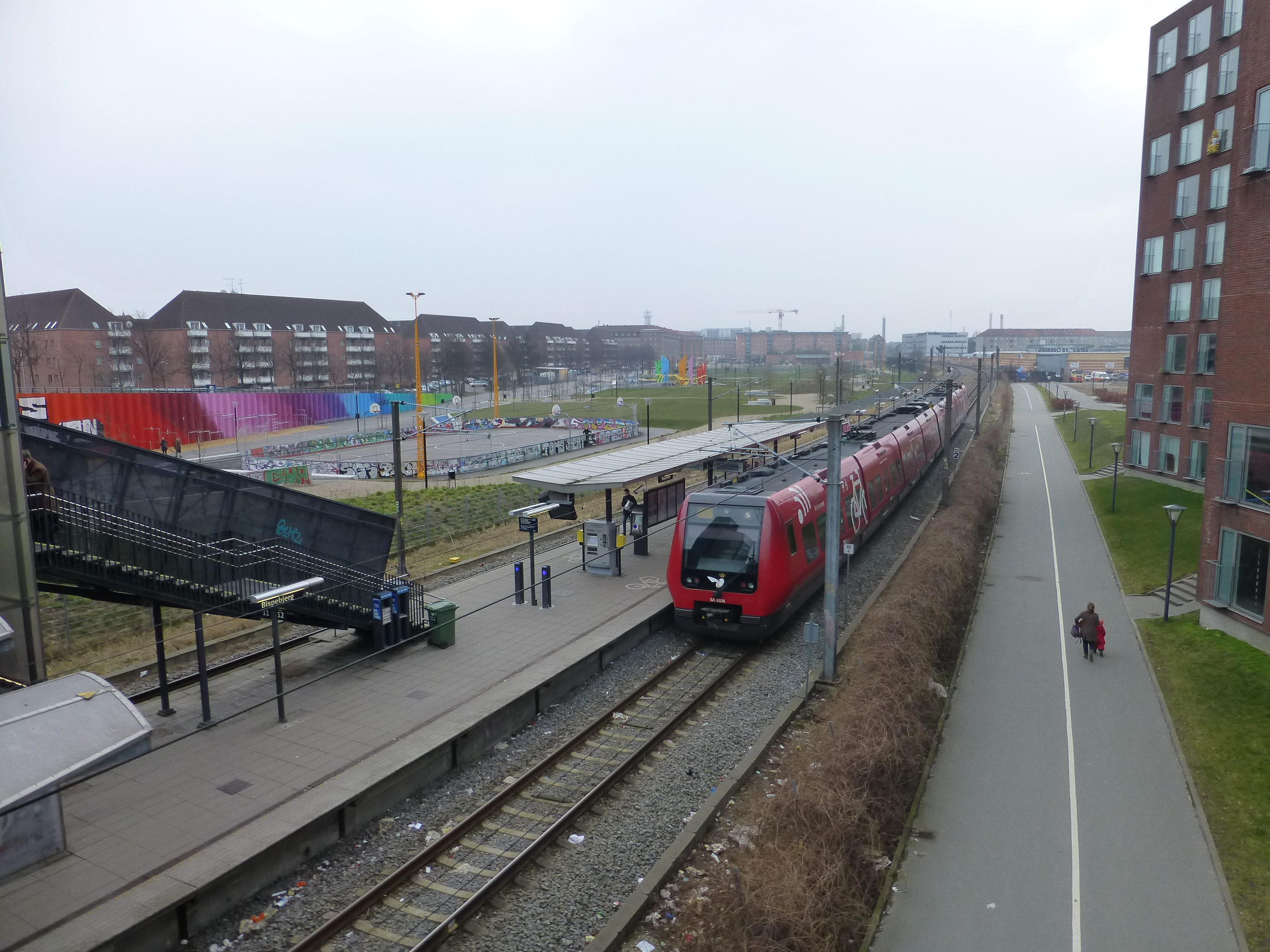
- Bispebjerg station in 2014

General information
- Location: Tagensvej 147; 2400 Copenhagen NV; Copenhagen Municipality; Denmark
- Coordinates: 55°42′23″N 12°32′30″E
- Elevation: 10.7 metres (35 ft)
- Owner: DSB (station infrastructure); Banedanmark (rail infrastructure)
- Line: Ring Line
- Platforms: 1 island platform
- Tracks: 2
- Train operators: DSB

Other information
- Station code: Bit
- Fare zone: 2
- Website: Official website

History
- Opened: 29 June 1996; 30 years ago

Services
Preceding station	S-train	Following station
Nørrebro towards Copenhagen South	F	Ryparken towards Hellerup
Location

Bispebjerg station is an S-train station on the Ring Line in Copenhagen, Denmark. Located on the boundary between the districts of Nørrebro and Bispebjerg, it serves parts of each, as well as the nearby Bispebjerg Hospital. It was opened in 1996 as a new station where the major street Tagensvej crosses the railway line.

== See also ==
- List of Copenhagen S-train stations
- List of railway stations in Denmark
