= Fuglebakken railway station =

Commuter railway station in Copenhagen, Denmark

Fuglebakken
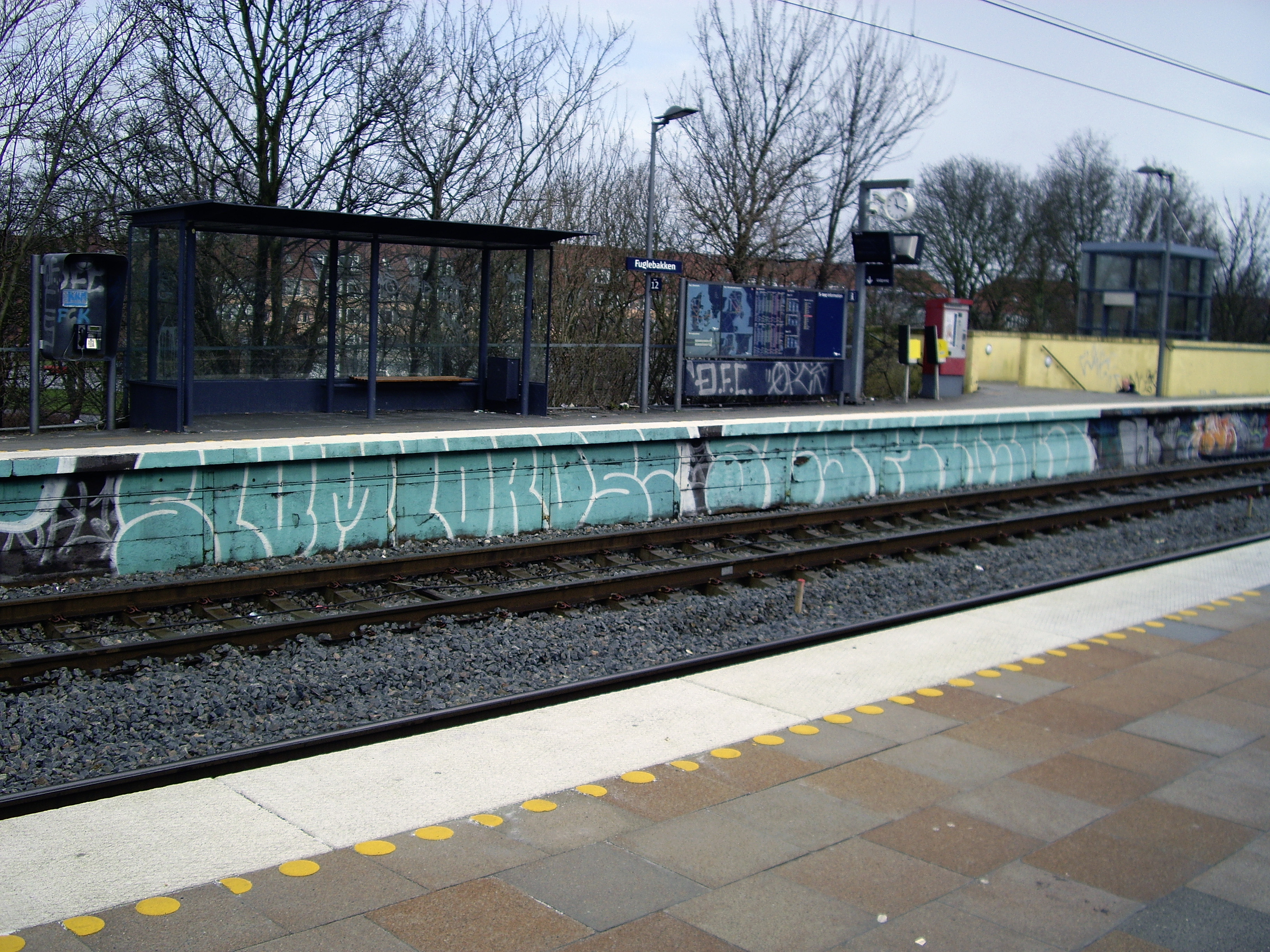
- Fuglebakken station in 2007

General information
- Location: Borups Allé 143; 2000 Frederiksberg; Frederiksberg Municipality; Denmark
- Coordinates: 55°41′43″N 12°31′36″E
- Elevation: 13.3 metres (44 ft)
- Owner: DSB (station infrastructure); Banedanmark (rail infrastructure)
- Platforms: 2 side platforms
- Tracks: 2
- Train operators: DSB

Other information
- Station code: Fut
- Fare zone: 2

History
- Opened: 15 May 1936; 90 years ago

Services
| Preceding station | S-train | Following station |
|---|---|---|
| Grøndal towards Copenhagen South | F | Nørrebro towards Hellerup |
Location

Fuglebakken station is an S-train station serving the neighbourhood of Fuglebakken in the northern part of Frederiksberg in Copenhagen, Denmark. It is located on the Ring Line of Copenhagen's S-train network.

== See also ==
- List of Copenhagen S-train stations
- List of railway stations in Denmark
