= Ringbanen =

Commuter railway line in Greater Copenhagen, Denmark

Ring Line

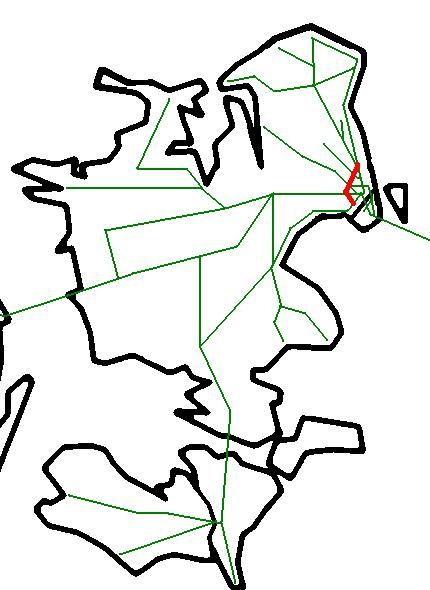

Overview
- Native name: Ringbanen
- Owner: Banedanmark
- Line number: 880
- Locale: Greater Copenhagen
- Termini: Hellerup; Copenhagen South
- Stations: 12
- Website: https://bane.dk

Service
- Type: Suburban rail
- System: Copenhagen S-train
- Operator(s): DSB
- Rolling stock: 4th generation S-train

Technical
- Number of tracks: 2
- Character: Grade-separated
- Track gauge: 1,435 mm (4 ft 8 1/2 in) standard gauge
- Electrification: 1,650 V DC overhead line
- Operating speed: 80 km/h (50 mph)
- Signalling: CBTC
Route map
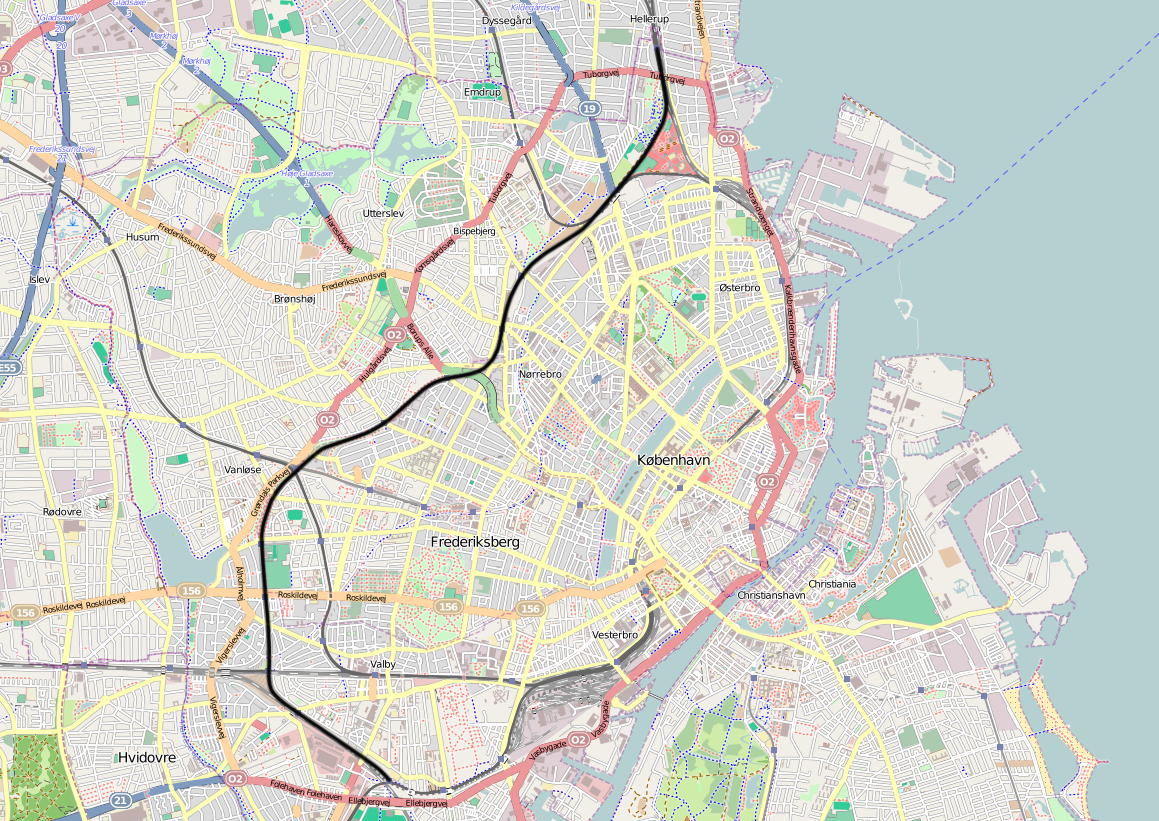
Map of the Ring Line between Hellerup and Copenhagen South

Ringbanen (lit. 'the Ring Line') is an S-train line in Copenhagen. Its route is roughly semicircular, running around the central part of Copenhagen and connecting the S-train radials about 5 km out.

== History ==
The ring line started as a freight bypass railway. In 1900 Copenhagen had a central station situated just inside Skt Jørgens Sø, from which railways went towards Roskilde (via Frederiksberg) and Hellerup (via Nørrebro, not the current station but where Nørrebroparken is now). A connecting line directly from Nørrebro to Frederiksberg was used by transiting freight, in order to relieve the central station which had been pushing its capacity limit for decades. Apart from capacity problem, the lines through Frederiksberg and Nørrebro had many level crossings, to the increasing irritation of motorists as their number and the number and trains both grew.

These problems were solved for passenger trains by the new (current) central station opened in 1911 and its underground connection to Østerport was finished in 1921 (after delays due to World War I). The new station and its approaches let trains reach the station from north or west without any level crossings at all, and the new station was so voluminous that it did not begin to have capacity trouble until about 1990.

A new large central freight yard south of the current central station had been opened in 1901, but to reach it, freight trains from the north still had to use the old lines Hellerup-Nørrebro-Frederiksberg-Vigerslev to get to the freight yard's approaches. Instead of trying to separate the old line from road traffic it was decided to build an all new grade-separated freight bypass a bit farther out from the city, which is what eventually became today's Ringbane.

The new freight bypass opened in 1930. It diverged from the old Hellerup line at the large shunting yard Lersøen between the present Ryparken and Bispebjerg stations, and at Vigerslev (present-day Danshøj) joined the approaches to the freight yard. At Flintholm there were connecting curves from north and south towards Frederiksberg (which in those days was an important freight destination), and at Vigerslev a double-track triangle junction allowed trains going to the freight yard or directly towards Roskilde.

Initially the only passenger stations were Lyngbyvej (now Ryparken), Nørrebro (500 m NW of its old position) and Godthåbsvej (now Grøndal). Here the modest passenger service between Frederiksberg and Hellerup called; the trains went directly from Frederiksberg to Godthåbsvej through the connecting curve at Flintholm. Flintholm itself had no passenger service until much later, and there was no passenger service south of Flintholm.

While the freight bypass was being built, plans to move some of the local trains around Copenhagen to electric operations were being laid. The independent municipality of Frederiksberg succeeded in getting the first electric trains to be the line to Frederiksberg, in part because it had contributed financially to the freight bypass and not gotten much passenger service out of it, in part by referring to promises made to when Frederiksberg lost mainline rail service in 1911 when the central station moved. In order to connect the new electric trains to the Frederikssund line it was decided that trains would stop (and reverse) at Vanløse between Frederiksberg and Godthåbsvej. A third connecting curve at Flintholm was built to allow direct running from Vanløse towards Hellerup, and the first S-train service began in 1934 with the route:

Frederiksberg - Vanløse (reverse) - Godthåbsvej - Nørrebro - Lyngbyvej - Hellerup - Charlottenlund - Ordrup - Klampenborg

In 1936 Fuglebakken station between Godthåbsvej and Nørrebro opened, and around 1940 Vanløse station was rebuilt completely as part of the electrification of the Frederikssund line, but this did not significantly affect operations on the Frederiksberg line.

Not much changed for the next 45 years. Ryparken station was rebuilt in connection with the Hareskovbanen reconstruction in the mid-1970s. In 1986 the two new stations Solbjerg (now Fasanvej) and Lindevang between Frederiksberg and Vanløse were opened. About this time rail freight to and from points north of Hellerup dwindled to almost nothing as the DanLink plan moved the rail ferries carrying freight to/from Sweden from Helsingør to Østerport. But the freight line out of Østerport led to Lersøen, so most of the ring line still had active freight traffic.

The 1990s, however, saw fundamental change. The decision to build the Øresund bridge meant that freight would soon be absent on the entire freight bypass. At the same time policial determination to use revenue from Ørestad land sales to finance the Copenhagen Metro was building. It was decided to let the Frederiksberg-Vanløse line become part of the metro and to extend the S-trains from Hellerup along the now unused freight line south of Flintholm.

The Frederiksberg-Vanløse line closed a bit at a time between 1995 and 2001 and reopened as a metro line in 2003. The entire line from Vanløse to Hellerup was closed for a complete track rebuilding for most of 2001 and reopened in early 2002, though only from a temporary terminus north of Flintholm, where all of the connecting curves had been removed. In 2004 the new large interchange station at Flintholm opened, and from early 2005 the ring line trains could run almost all the way to Ny Ellebjerg. From Flintholm to Vigerslev Allé the ring line tracks occupy the same space as the old freight bypass; between Vigerslev Allé and Ny Ellebjerg new tracks have been built beside the freight tracks which are still in use for freight to and from the Øresund bridge, bypassing the central station.

The southern terminus at Ny Ellebjerg opened quietly on 16 November 2006, a few months in advance of the official opening on 6 January 2007. Originally it had been planned that there would be platforms at the Øresund bypass tracks in addition to the S-train platforms, although these platforms were only built later in 2013, and only began to see more frequent use upon the completion of the high-speed Copenhagen - Ringsted Line in 2019. The M4 line of the Copenhagen Metro terminates here since completion in 2024, and the station was renamed "København Syd" (Copenhagen South) in 2024, indicating its new importance as an interchange between InterCity trains, and the local Metro and S-train systems, reducing the need to travel into the city centre beforehand.

== Future ==
The Danish Transport Authority (Trafikstyrelsen) has suggested converting the Ringbanen to metro standard as line M5, but this plan is dependent on the construction of a southern extension of the Copenhagen Metro from Copenhagen Central Station through Sydhavn to Ny Ellebjerg, where the M4 would link up with the Ringbanen. The only current interchange between the Ringbanen and the metro network is at Flintholm Station, where they cross out of level at right angles.

== Stations ==
Name	Services	Opened	S-trains	Comments
Ny Ellebjerg	F, A, E, M	16 November 2006		Transfer to Køge radial
Gl. Køge Landevej	—	8 January 2005		Temporary terminus; closed when Ny Ellebjerg opened
Vigerslev Allé	F, M	8 January 2005		
Danshøj	F, B, Bx, M	8 January 2005		Transfer to Tåstrup radial
Ålholm	F, M	8 January 2005		
KB Hallen	F, M	8 January 2005		
Flintholm	C, F, H, M	24 January 2004		Transfer to Frederikssund radial and metro
C.F. Richs Vej	—	2 February 2002		Temporary terminus, closed 23 January 2004
Grøndal	F, M	15 May 1930	3 April 1934	Named Godthåbsvej until 29 September 1996
Fuglebakken	F, M	15 May 1936		
Nørrebro	F, M	15 May 1930	3 April 1934	Transfer to metro; bus terminal; cross-link express bus 350S
Bispebjerg	F, M	29 June 1996		
Ryparken	B, Bx, F, M	1 February 1926	3 April 1934	Transfer to Farum radial; named Lyngbyvej until 1 October 1972; bus terminal; cross-link express bus 150S
Hellerup	F, A, C, E, M	22 July 1863	3 April 1934	Transfer to Hillerød and Klampenborg radials

== Service pattern ==
Trains on the ring line carry service designator F and run from 5:30 to 0:50. In the period between about 7.00 and 19.00 on Monday to Friday, there is one stopping train every 5 minutes. Outside this period, there is one stopping train every 10 minutes.

== See also ==
- List of Copenhagen S-train lines
- Transportation in Copenhagen
- List of railway lines in Denmark
- Rail transport in Denmark
- Transportation in Denmark
- History of rail transport in Denmark
- S-train (Copenhagen)
- Banedanmark
