= Fuglebakken, Frederiksberg =

Coordinates: 55°41′23″N 12°31′26″E

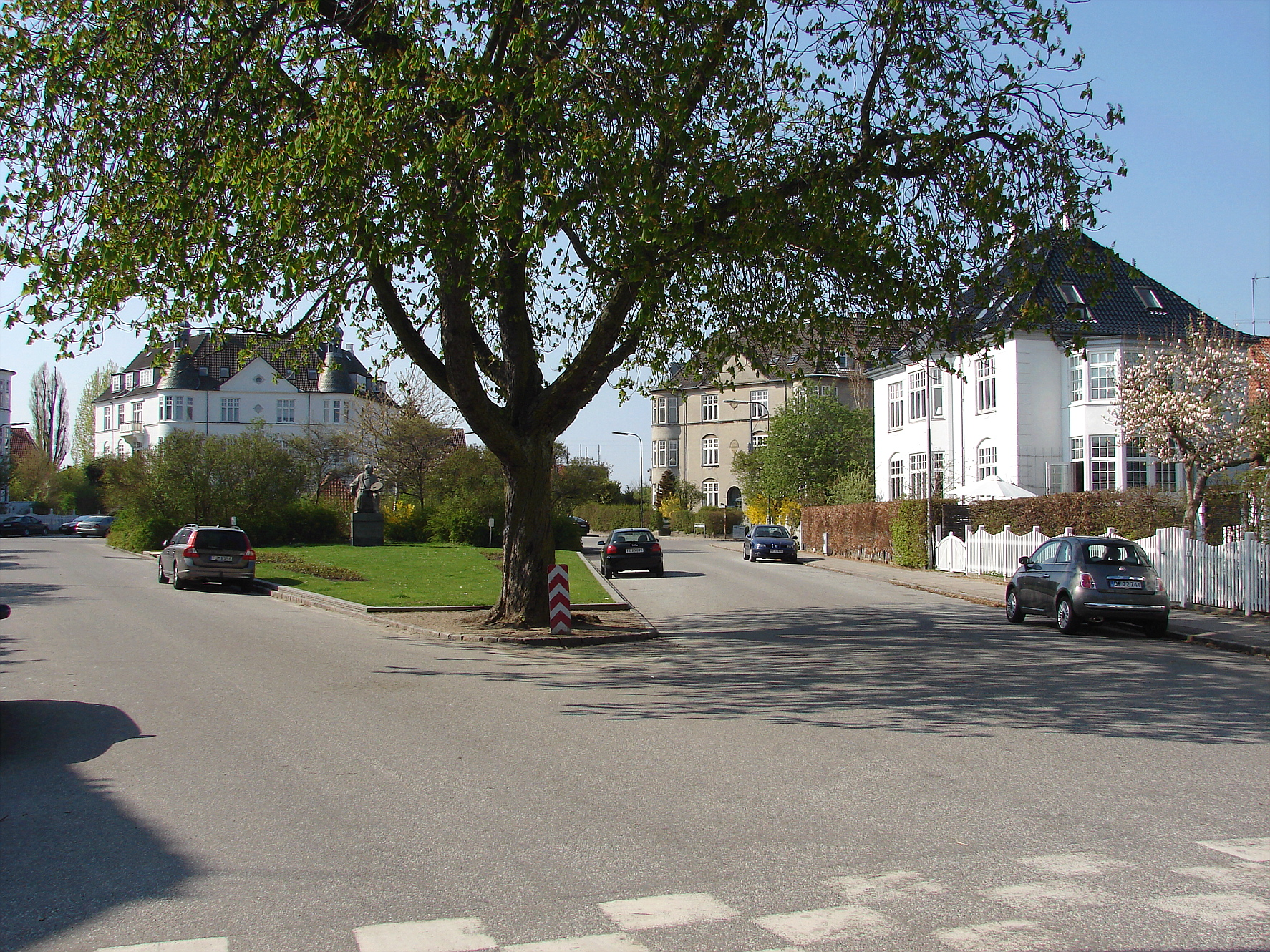
Kristian Zahrtmanns Plads in the centre of the neighbourhood

Fuglebakken (literally "The Bird Hill"), also known as Fuglebakkekvarteret (English: The Fuglebakke neighbourhood), is a mostly residential neighbourhood in the northern part of Frederiksberg in Copenhagen, Denmark. The area is bounded by Godthåbsvej to the south, Nordre Fasanvej to the east, Krohaven to the north and the S-train line on the municipal border with Copenhagen to the west. It consists of a mixture of single family detached homes, terraced housing and apartment buildings.

== History ==
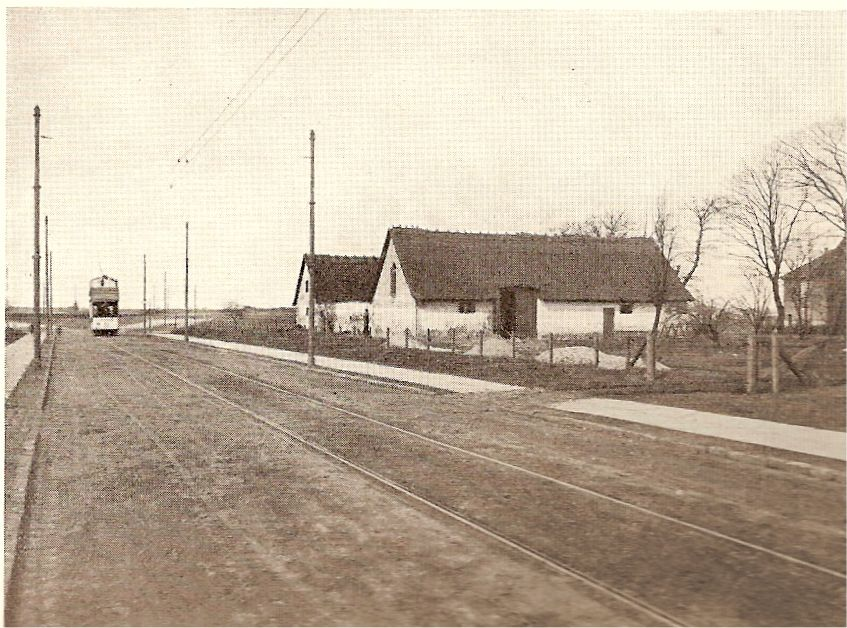
Tram on Mariendalsvej with Lille Godthåb seen to the right

The land originally belonged to Store Godthåb but was sold to the two new country houses Fuglebakken and Lille Godthåb in the late 18th century. In about 1900, it was acquired by a consortium and development began when a tram line was extended to a tram loop at present day Kristian Zartmanns Plads in 1905. The central part of the Fuglebakken area was built over with single family detached homes and terraced houses over the next three decades while taller buildings were constructed along its edges. The area between Vagtelvej and the railway in the westernmost part of the area was the site of an industrial zone until the 1960s when the industrial buildings were replaced by 8 large apartment blocks. The area was served by trams from 1905.

== Landmarks ==
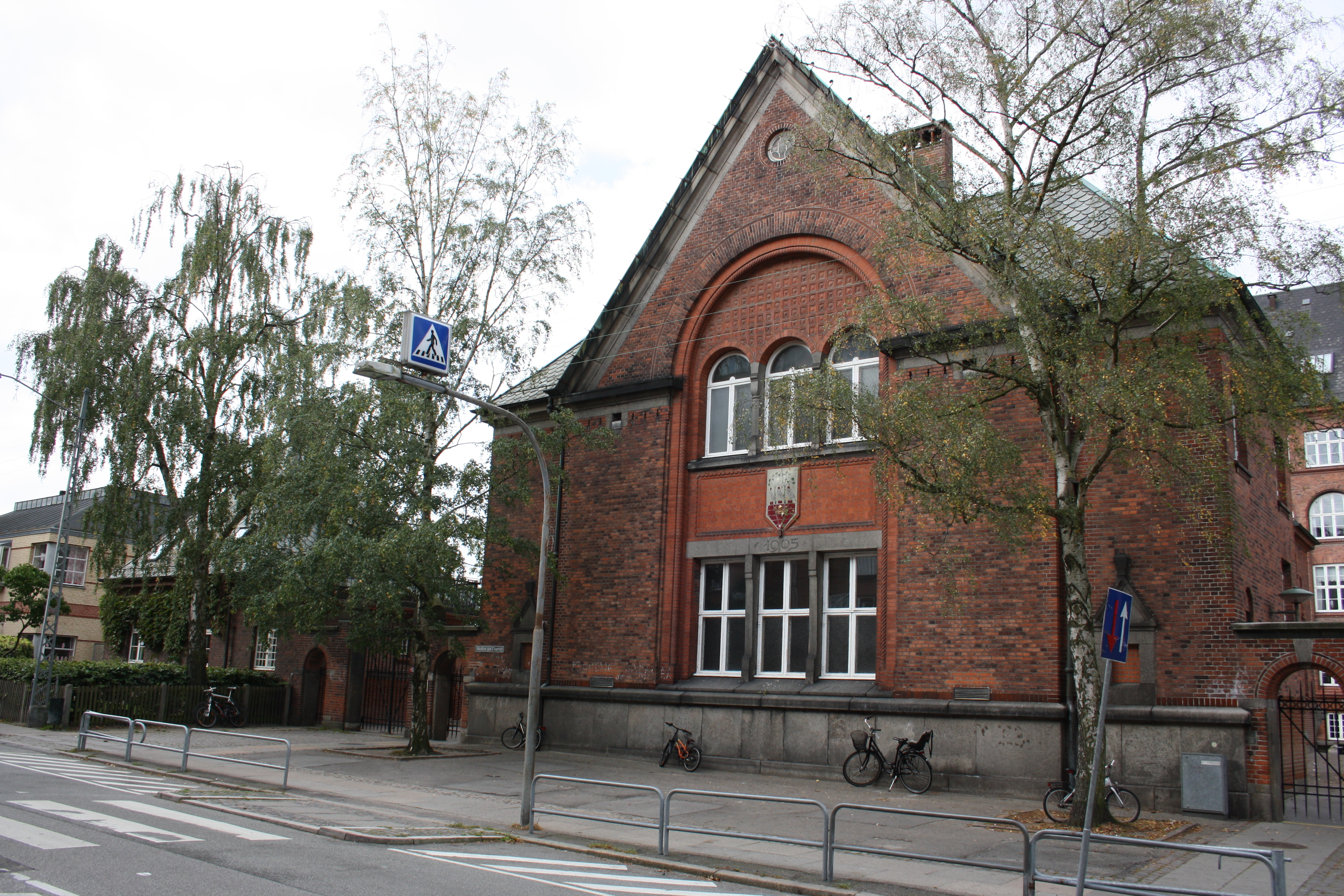
Duevej School

Bakkehusene is a large development of terraced housing built in 1928–29 to design by the architect Thorkild Henningsen. It consists of 165 houses and is listed..

Duevej School, a public primary school, opened in 1905 to design by Valdemar Schmidt and is still in use. The main building, gymnastics hall, former principal's residence and school yard are listed. The building at Drosselvej 7 is a former children's hospital from 1913 which has been converted into apartments.

On Kristian Zahrtmanns Plads stands a statue of Kristian Zahrtmann. It was created by the sculptor Hans Syberg and unveiled in 1931.

== Notable people ==
Former prime minister Jens Otto Krag and his wife the actress Helle Virkner lived at Egernvej 61. Soviet First Secretary Nikita Khrushchev visited their home during his state visit to Denmark in 1964. Another politician, Aksel Larsen, had his home on Fuglebakkevej for almost 20 years. Other notable residents in the area include the actors Lily Broberg, Paul Hütte and Birthe Neumann, the sculptors Gunnar Hammerich and Edvard Eriksen, the painters Albert Naur and Kristian Zahrtmann, writer and painter Mogens Lorentzen, author Henri Nathansen and the composer Niels Viggo Bentzon.

== Cultural references ==
In Klaus Tothstein's essay Farvel til Fuglebakken (A Farewell to Fuglebakken), published in Weekendavisen on 22 February 2019, he reflects on moving away from the neighbourhood after 25 years. His home on Solsortevej was used as a location in Jonas Elmers 1997 film Let's Get Lost. Vera Gebuhr's character, who lives in the house, is called Mrs. Rothstein after the name that already featured on the front door.

The house at Fuglebakken 64 was used as Frank's (Frank Hvam) and Mia's (Muia Lyne) home in season 1 of the television series Klovn.

== Transport ==
Fuglebakken station is located on the S-train network's Ring Line.

== See also ==
- Mariendalsvej
