= Ryparken railway station =

Commuter railway station in Copenhagen, Denmark

Ryparken
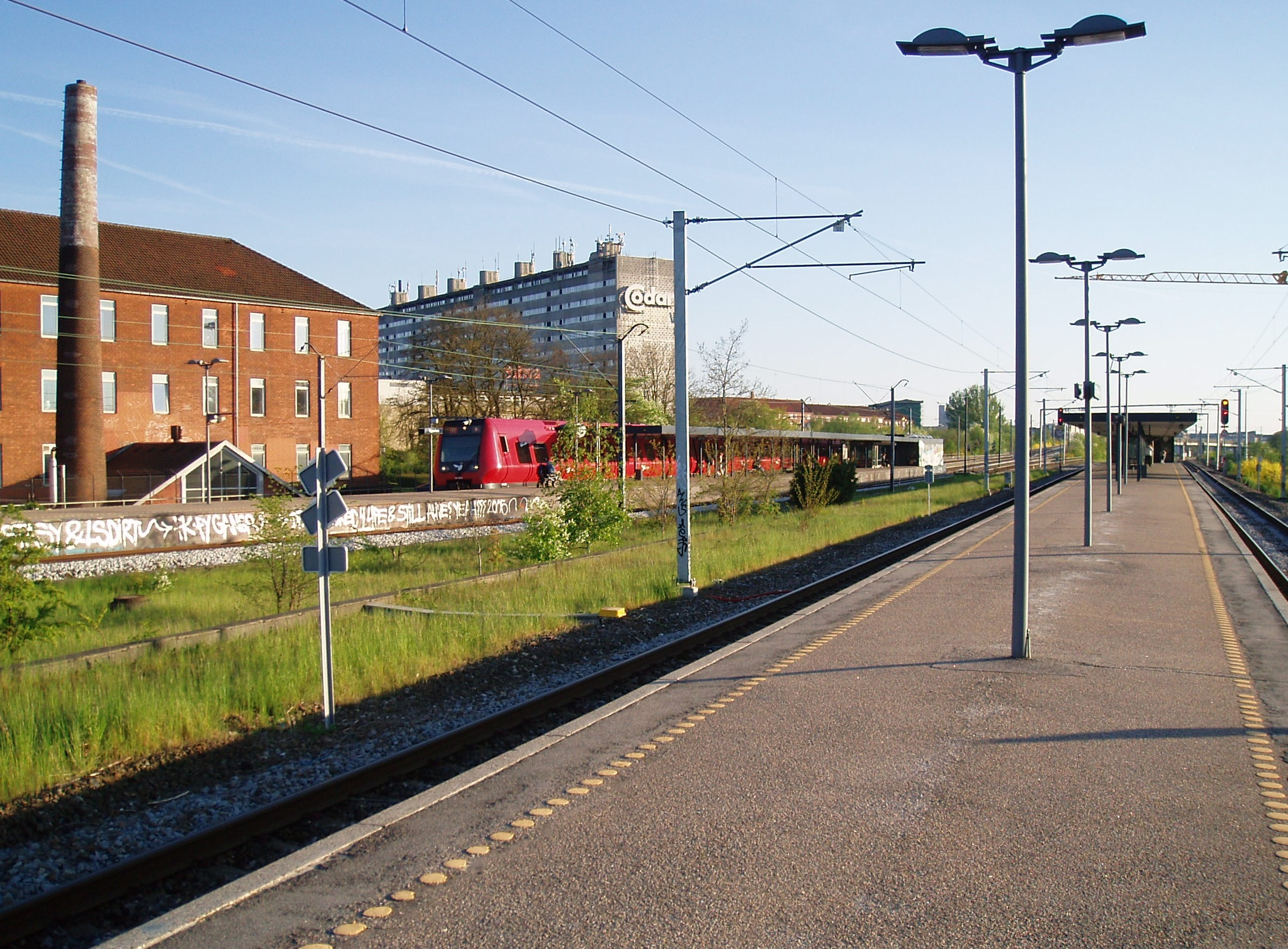
- Ryparken station in 2007

General information
- Location: Lyngbyvej 102; 2100 Copenhagen Ø Copenhagen Municipality; Denmark
- Coordinates: 55°42′56″N 12°33′35″E
- Elevation: 10.3 metres (34 ft)
- System: S-train station
- Owner: DSB (station infrastructure); Banedanmark (rail infrastructure)
- Platforms: 2 Island platforms
- Tracks: 4
- Train operators: DSB

Other information
- Station code: Ryt
- Fare zone: 2
- Website: Official website

History
- Opened: 1 February 1926; 100 years ago
- Rebuilt: 3 April 1934 (S-train)
- Electrified: 1934 (S-train)

Services
Preceding station	S-train	Following station
Emdrup towards Farum	B	Svanemøllen towards Høje Taastrup
Emdrup towards Buddinge	Bx Peak hours	Svanemøllen towards Høje Taastrup
Bispebjerg towards Copenhagen South	F	Hellerup Terminus
Location
- Location within Copenhagen Location within Greater Copenhagen Location within Denmark

Ryparken station is an S-train railway station serving the district of Østerbro in Copenhagen, Denmark. It serves as an interchange station between the Ring line and Farum radial of Copenhagen's S-train network and is serviced by the B, F, and H lines. The station was originally named Lyngbyvej Station but was renamed to Ryparken Station in 1972.

== History ==
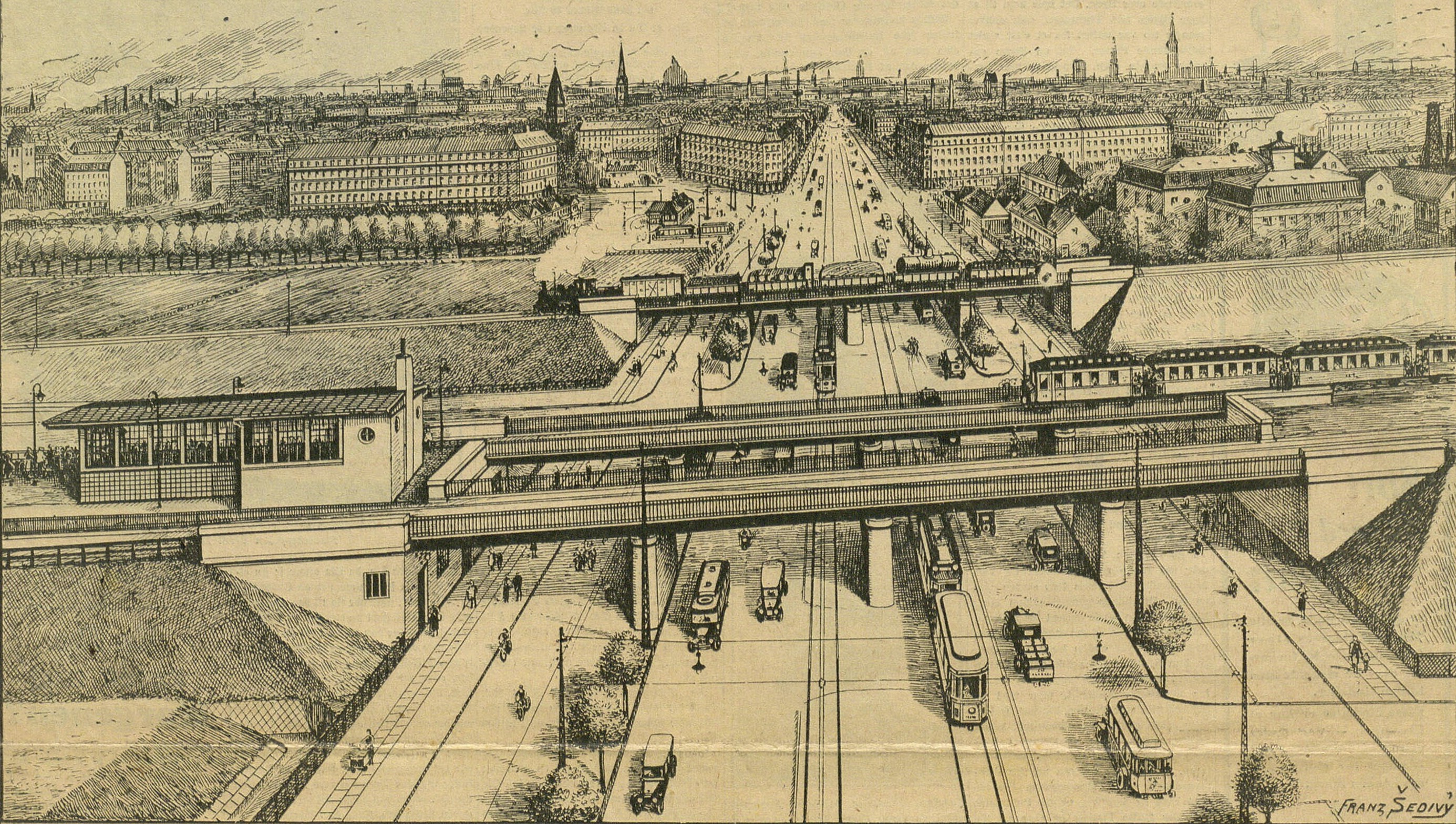
Franz Šedivý: Ryparken Station, 1931

Ryparken Station opened on 1 February 1926. Just a few years later, the station was among the first served by the S-train, as service began on the 3 of April 1934 when the line Frederiksberg-Vanløse-Hellerup-Klampenborg was opened.

== See also ==
- List of Copenhagen S-train stations
- List of railway stations in Denmark
- Rail transport in Denmark
