= Svanemøllen railway station =

Commuter railway station in Copenhagen, Denmark

Svanemøllen
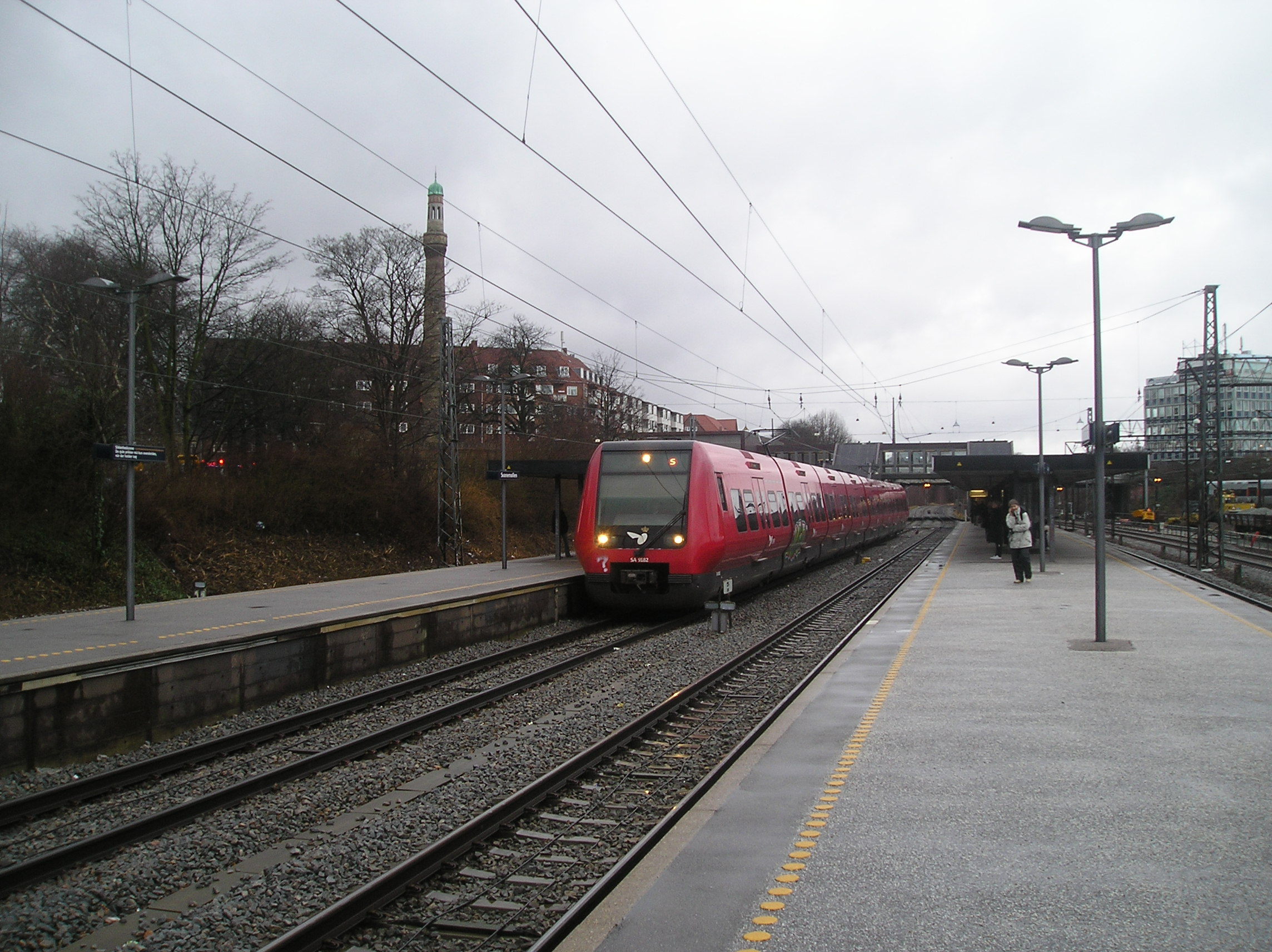
- Svanemøllen station in 2008

General information
- Location: Østerbrogade 246; Copenhagen Ø Copenhagen Municipality; Denmark
- Coordinates: 55°42′56″N 12°34′41″E
- Elevation: 4.9 metres (16 ft)
- Owner: DSB (station infrastructure); Banedanmark (rail infrastructure)
- Platforms: 2 Island platforms
- Tracks: 4
- Train operators: DSB

Construction
- Architect: Knud Tanggaard Seest (1934); Ole Ejnar Bonding (1970)

Other information
- Website: Svanemøllen Station

History
- Opened: 1934
- Rebuilt: 1970

Services
Preceding station	S-train	Following station
Hellerup towards Hillerød	A	Nordhavn towards Hundige
Hellerup towards Hillerød	A Sat–Sun	Nordhavn towards Køge
Ryparken towards Farum	B	Nordhavn towards Høje Taastrup
Ryparken towards Buddinge	Bx Peak hours	Nordhavn towards Høje Taastrup
Hellerup towards Klampenborg	C	Nordhavn towards Frederikssund
Hellerup towards Holte	E Mon–Fri	Nordhavn towards Køge
Location

Svanemøllen station is an S-train station serving the northern part of the district of Østerbro in Copenhagen, Denmark. It is served by the A, B, Bx, C, and E services of Copenhagen's S-train network.

== History ==
Svanemøllen station was inaugurated on 15 May 1934 simultaneously with the opening of the Boulevardbanen between Østerport station and Copenhagen Central Station also known Røret (literally: the tube).

In 2005, the station was rebuilt. The existing shop and DSB ticket office were merged into a new 7-Eleven shop that is located just inside the station entrance.

== Number of travellers ==
According to the Østtællingen in 2008:

År	Antal	År	Antal	År	Antal	År	Antal
1957	4.269	1974	3.393	1991	6.291	2001	6.510
1960	3.486	1975	3.446	1992	6.121	2002	6.510
1962	3.793	1977	3.403	1993	6.044	2003	6.448
1964	3.850	1979	5.952	1995	5.874	2004	6.993
1966	4.175	1981	6.192	1996	6.022	2005	6.951
1968	3.927	1984	6.084	1997	5.669	2006	7.178
1970	3.903	1987	5.810	1998	6.008	2007	7.782
1972	3.911	1990	5.917	2000	6.942	2008	7.387

== Facilities ==
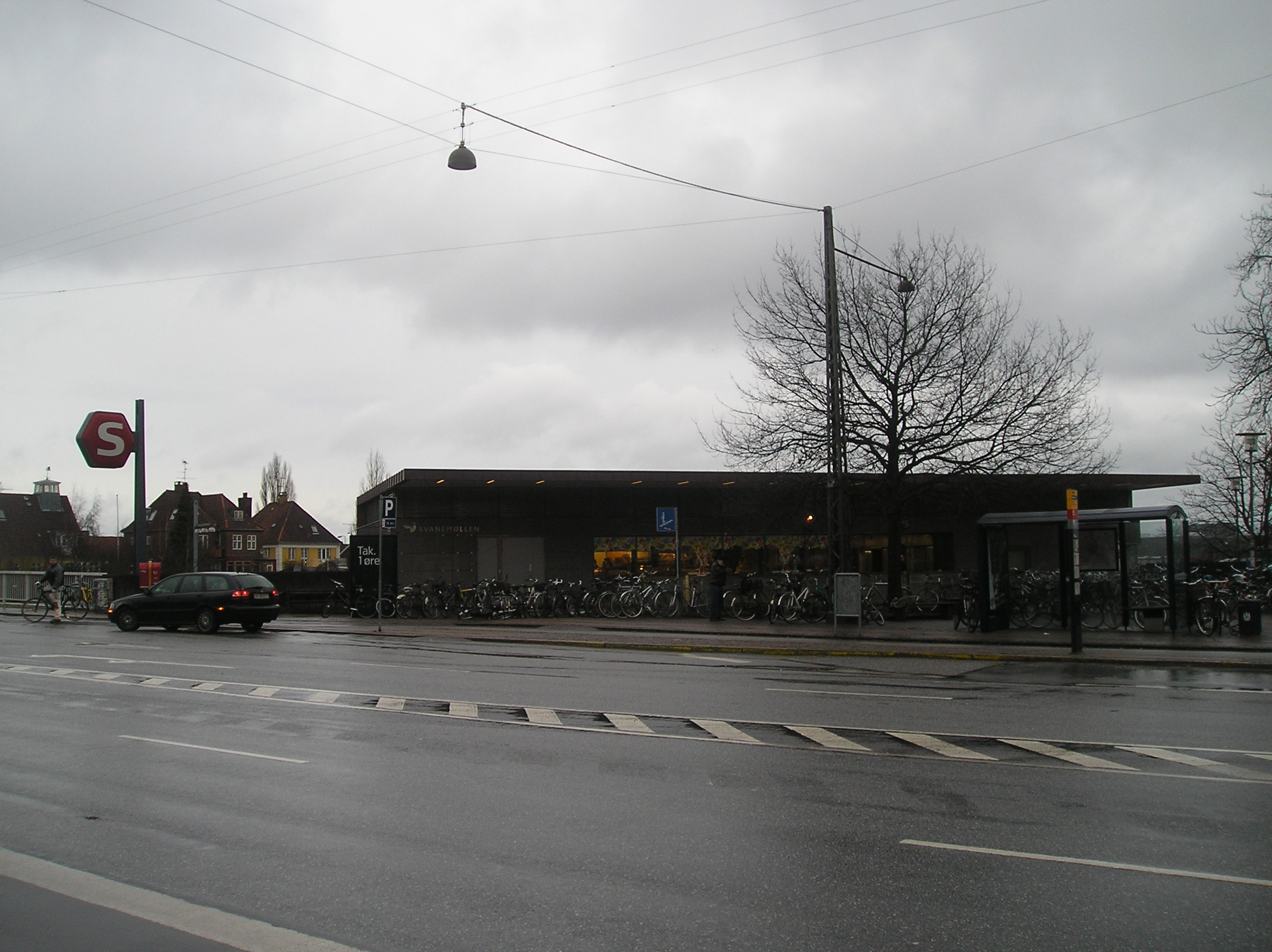
Main entrance to Svanemøllen station. Note the number of bikes.

Like most S-Train stations in Copenhagen, this station does not have many facilities for passengers.

Lifts are provided from street-level to the S-Train platforms for step-free access, along with upwards-moving escalators and stairs. There are no toilets available anywhere within the station.

At street-level, there are two DSB ticket machines, and one Rejsekort vending machine. There is also a 7-Eleven shop, accessible via the station entrance. There is a large bicycle parking area outside the station.

== Trivia ==
The S-Train tracks are labelled as 3, 4, 5 and 6, but there are no tracks 1 and 2. Tracks 1 and 2 are for the regional train, which doesn't stop at this station.

For the S-trains, there are two platforms each with two tracks. One of these platforms handles all southbound traffic and the other platform handles all northbound traffic.

== See also ==
- List of Copenhagen S-train stations
- List of railway stations in Denmark
