= F (S-train) =

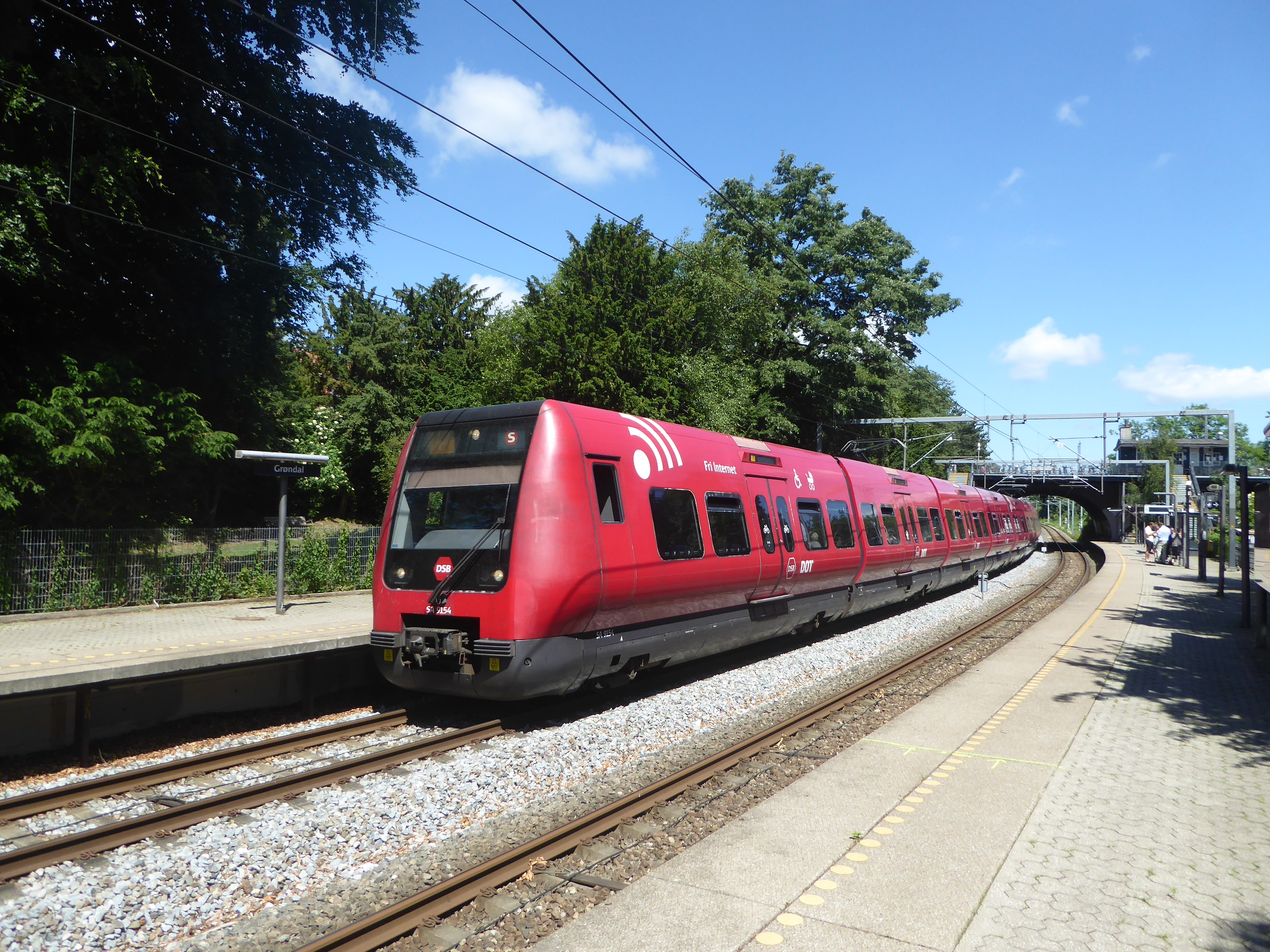
- S-train line F at Grøndal Station (2017)

Overview
- Status: Operational
- Owner: Banedanmark
- Locale: Copenhagen metropolitan area
- Termini: Hellerup; Copenhagen South
- Stations: 12

Service
- Type: Suburban rail, urban rail
- System: S-train
- Operator(s): DSB
- Rolling stock: Litra SA and SE

History
- Opened: 3 April 1934; 92 years ago

Technical
- Line length: 12 km (7.5 mi)
- Track gauge: 1,435 mm (4 ft 8 1/2 in) standard gauge
- Operating speed: 80 km/h (50 mph)

F is the service designation for trains on the ring line of Copenhagen's S-train network. It runs from 05:00 to 01:00 from Copenhagen South to Hellerup. Trains run every 5 minutes between about 7:00 and 19:00, Monday through Friday, and every 10 minutes on weekends, early mornings and late evenings/nights. On Friday and Saturday nights there is also a 30 minutes service throughout the night. This line is planned to become a pilot project for driverless operation, with testing starting in 2031/32.

== History ==
See Ringbanen for a fuller history.

Name	Southern end	Years	Northern end
1c	Ringbanen: to Frederiksberg	1934–1950	Klampenborgbanen: to Hellerup; often extended to Klampenborg
F	Ringbanen: to Frederiksberg	1950–1989	Klampenborgbanen: to Hellerup; often extended to Klampenborg
F	Ringbanen: to Frederiksberg	1989–1998	terminated at Hellerup
F	to Solbjerg (later renamed Fasanvej)	1998–1999	to Klampenborg in day hours
F	to Vanløse	2000–2001	to Klampenborg in day hours
F	to C.F. Richsvej (temporary station)	2002–2003	terminates at Hellerup
F	to Flintholm	2004	terminates at Hellerup
F	to Gammel Køge Landevej (temporary station)	2005–2006	terminates at Hellerup
F	to Copenhagen South	2007-	terminates at Hellerup

=== Fx, M, F+ ===
The ring line also has a history of supplementary services with other designations than F. At some times the variant service letters have been used to indicate which trains continued from Hellerup to Klampenborg. In other periods it has simply been because then-prevalent principles mandated that a single service letter such as F could not be used for more than exactly 3 trains an hour, so in parts of the day when more trains ran, extra services had to be invented.

Name	Southern end	Years	Northern end
Fx	Ringbanen: to Frederiksberg in rush hours	1972–1979	terminated at Hellerup
no supplement 1979–1989
M	Ringbanen: to Frederiksberg	1989–1998	terminated at Hellerup
M	to Solbjerg (later renamed Fasanvej)	1998–1999	terminated at Hellerup
M	to Vanløse	2000–2001	terminated at Hellerup
F+	to C.F. Richsvej (temporary station)	2002–2003	Klampenborgbanen: to Klampenborg in day hours
F+	to Flintholm	2004	Klampenborgbanen: to Klampenborg in day hours
F+	to Gammel Køge Landevej (temporary station), all week/all day	2005	to Klampenborg daytime Sat-Sun
F+	to Gammel Køge Landevej (temporary station), all week/all day	2006	to Klampenborg in daytime all week
F+	to Ny Ellebjerg	2007	to Klampenborg in daytime all week
Joined into F from September 2007
