= Hellerup railway station =

Railway station in Copenhagen, Denmark

Hellerup
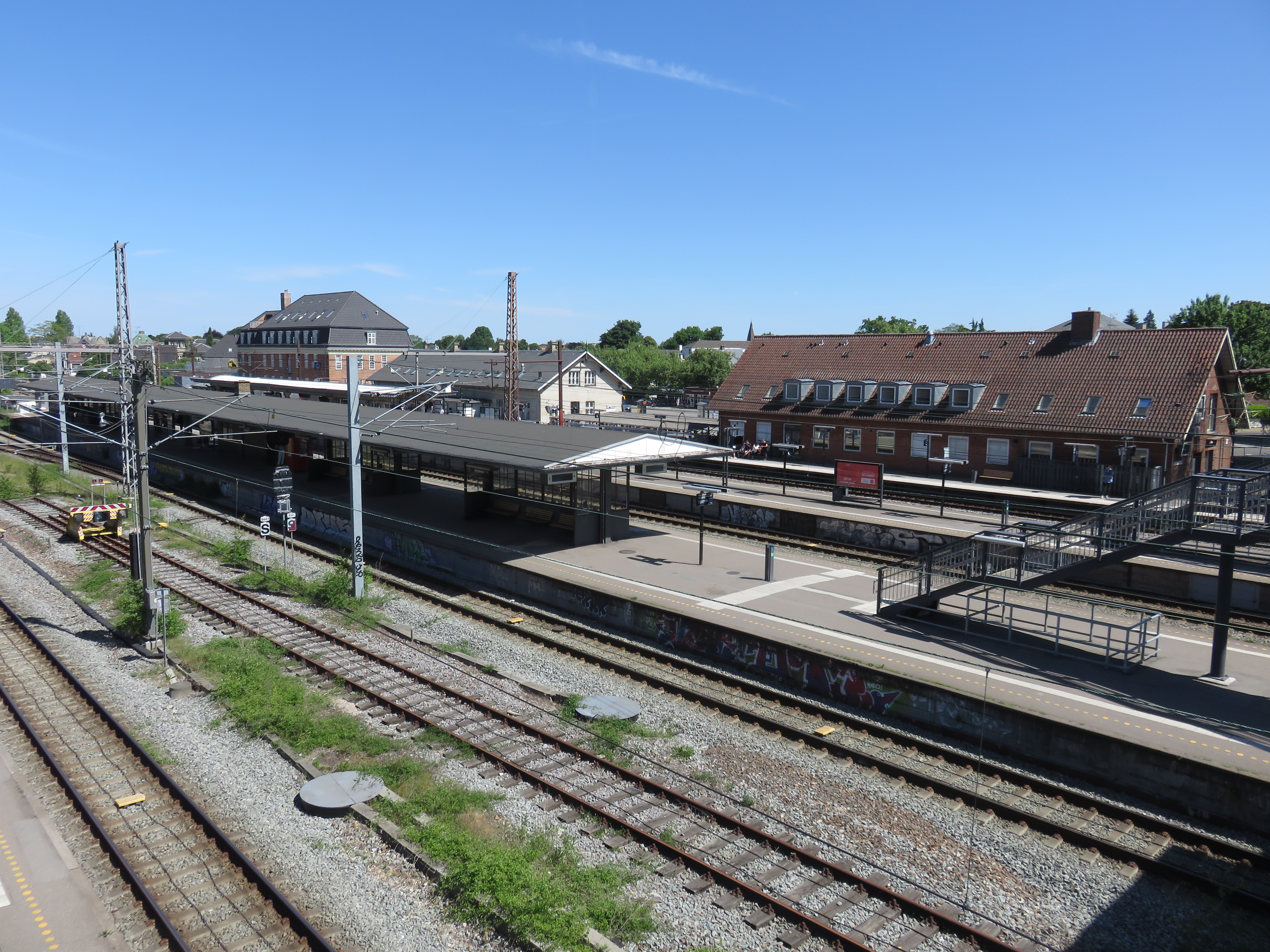
- Hellerup station in 2018

General information
- Location: Ryvangs Allé 79C; 2900 Hellerup; Copenhagen Municipality; Denmark
- Coordinates: 55°43′52″N 12°34′00″E
- Elevation: 9.3 metres (31 ft)
- Owner: DSB (station infrastructure); Banedanmark (rail infrastructure)
- Platforms: 4
- Tracks: 7
- Train operators: DSB
- Connections: Bus terminal

Other information
- Station code: Hl
- Fare zone: 2/30
- Website: Official website

History
- Opened: 22 July 1863; 163 years ago
- Rebuilt: 3 April 1934 (S-train)
- Electrified: 1934 (S-train); 1986 (Kystbanen)

Services
Preceding station	DSB	Following station
Klampenborg towards Helsingør	Elsinore–Copenhagen– Roskilde–Holbæk Regional train	Østerport towards Holbæk
Klampenborg towards Helsingør	Elsinore–Copenhagen– Roskilde–Næstved Regional train	Østerport towards Næstved
Kokkedal towards Helsingør	Elsinore–Copenhagen– Køge–Næstved Regional train Peak hours	Østerport towards Næstved
Preceding station	S-train	Following station
Lyngby towards Hillerød	A	Svanemøllen towards Hundige
Bernstorffsvej towards Hillerød	A Sat–Sun	Svanemøllen towards Køge
Charlottenlund towards Klampenborg	C	Svanemøllen towards Frederikssund
Bernstorffsvej towards Holte	E Mon–Fri	Svanemøllen towards Køge
Ryparken towards Copenhagen South	F	Terminus
Location

Hellerup station is a regional and S-train railway station serving the suburb of Hellerup north of Copenhagen, Denmark. The station is an important junction which is served by regional trains on the Coast Line, as well as several lines of the Copenhagen S-train network.

== History ==
The station was designed by V.C.H. Wolf and opened on 22 July 1863, simultaneously with the start of service on the Klampenborg line. The station was among the first on Copenhagen's S-train network. The first S-train line (Klampenborg station to Vanløse station) included Hellerup station. This was in 1934 and the S-trains initially followed the northern path of today's F-line. Hellerup station was the fourth station from Klampenborg and the fourth from Vanløse. Since then the southern part of the F-line has a new path and several new stations have opened, all south of Hellerup.

== Services ==
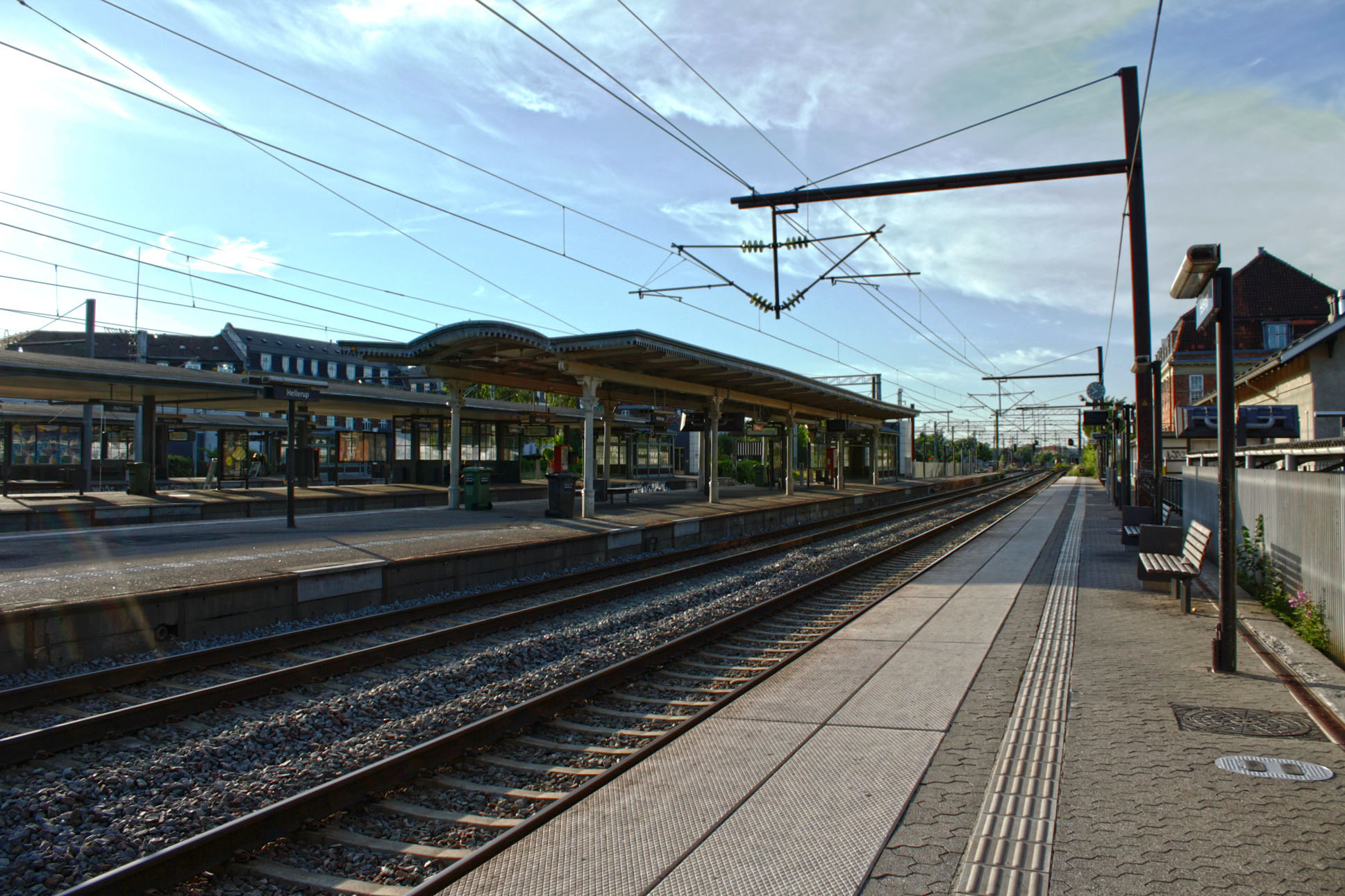
Platform level

The regional train lines goes from Nivå station to Copenhagen Airport via the City Centre, and from Helsingør via the City Centre to Copenhagen Airport and further (as Øresund train ) to Scania and some other provinces in southern Sweden. Each hour, six regional trains depart in each direction, a frequency which matches that of most S-train lines, and is unique among regional railway lines in and around Copenhagen.

The station also serves Copenhagen's S-train lines A, C, E, and F services. For the latter line the station is its northern end station or terminus. Weekdays there are 60 S-train departures every hour. There are twelve departures on Line-F (with 5 minutes between departures), and six departures in each direction for the other three lines. This gives 72 departing regional and S-trains every hour from the station's five platform tracks. This doesn't quite reflect the number of passengers who use the station, but it is still a rather important station.

Hellerup station is located within Copenhagen Municipality, but the immediate surroundings form the Hellerup borough of Gentofte municipality. Central Hellerup is near the station and is along the main roads built up of blocks with 4 to 5 floors. In the smaller streets many of Copenhagen's largest villas can be found and the Hellerup area is one of the richest in Denmark.

== Number of travellers ==
According to the Østtællingen in 2008:

Year	Travelers	Year	Travelers	Year	Travelers	Year	Travelers
1957	8.626	1974	6.777	1991	7.612	2001	6.810
1960	8.098	1975	6.050	1992	7.725	2002	7.302
1962	8.319	1977	5.283	1993	7.524	2003	7.357
1964	8.161	1979	6.711	1995	8.097	2004	7.385
1966	8.154	1981	7.558	1996	7.765	2005	7.467
1968	8.012	1984	6.697	1997	8.090	2006	7.412
1970	8.002	1987	6.209	1998	7.811	2007	7.502
1972	7.575	1990	6.874	2000	7.557	2008	7.359

== Cultural references ==
Hellerup station is seen at 1:24:10 in the 1975 Olsen-banden film The Olsen Gang on the Track.

== See also ==
- List of Copenhagen S-train stations
- List of railway stations in Denmark
- Rail transport in Denmark
- History of rail transport in Denmark
- Transportation in Copenhagen
- Transportation in Denmark
