= Valby Maskinfabrik =

Former industrial site in Copenhagen, Denmark

Valby Maskinfabrik is a former industrial site now under conversion into a mixed-use neighbourhood in the Valby district of Copenhagen, Denmark. It is located at the corner of Vigerslev Allé and Gammel Køge Landevej.

== History ==
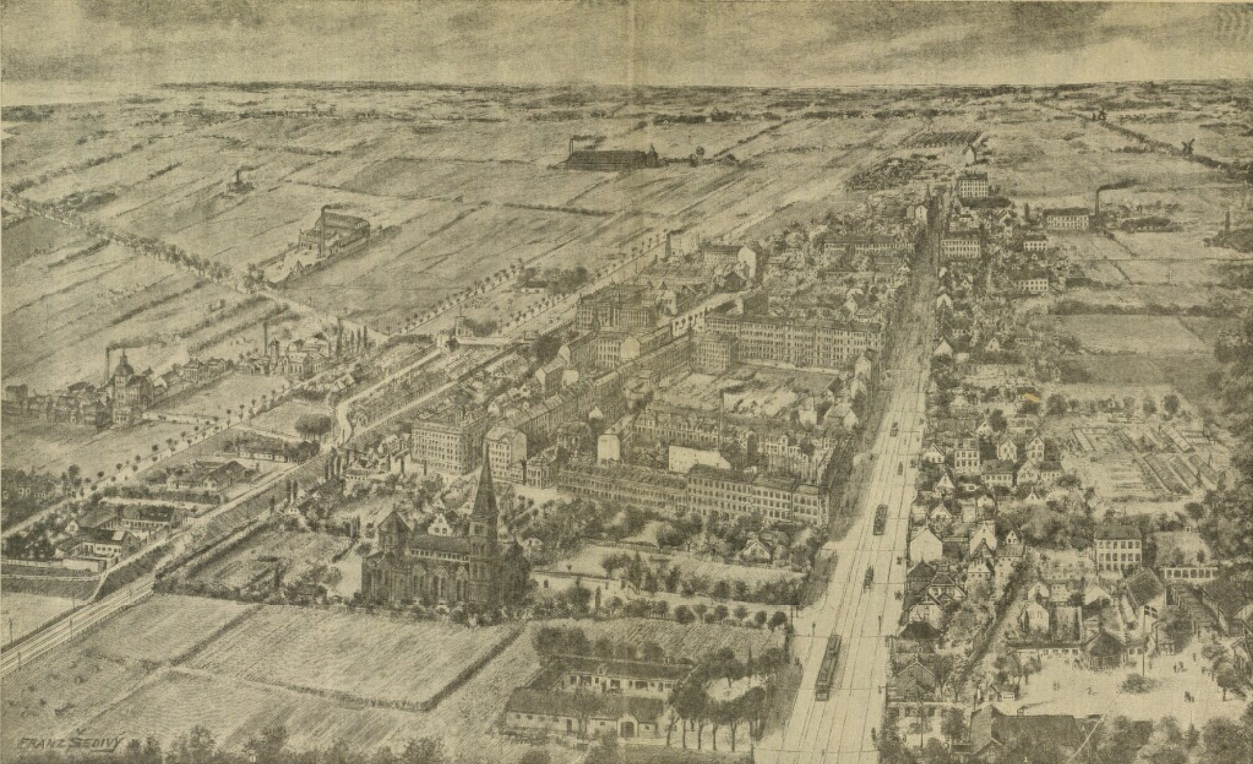
Franz Šedivý: F. L. Smidth & Co.

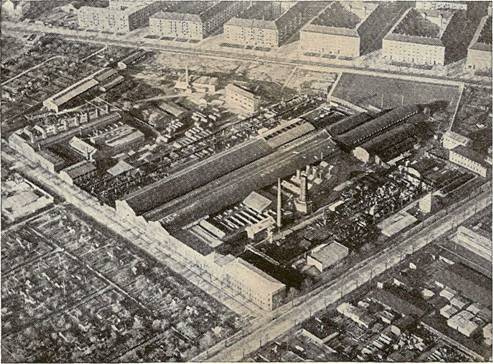
The F. L. Smidt site in 1940

F.L. Smidth was founded by Frederik Læssøe Smidth in 1882 and the company was initially based in his mother's house in Frederiksberg. In 1898 the company acquired a circa 25 ha area south of the village of Valby to build its own machine factory. The site was used for manufacturing machinery for the concrete industry. In 1950, it was the workplace of 2,000 workers. The area was decommissioned as a manufacturing site in the early 1990s. De Forenede Ejendomsselskaber acquired most of the site in 2001.

== Redevelopment ==
The masterplan for the area was designed by Arkitema Architects. It comprises approximately 1,200 apartments and 40,000 square metres of office space.

== Street names ==
Streets in the area are named after Danish actors and actresses. Names include:

- Axel Strøbyes Vej after Axel Strøbye
- Bodil Ipsens Vej after Bodil Ipsen
- Buster Larsens Vej after Buster Larsen
- Clara Pontoppidans Vej after Clara Pontoppidan
- Ebbe Rodes Allé after Ebbe Rode
- Ib Schønbergs Allé after Ib Schønberg
- Karin Nellemoses Vej after Karin Nellemose
- Kirsten Walthers Vej after Kirsten Walther
- Lily Brobergs Vej after Lily Broberg
- Lise Ringheims Vej after Lise Ringheim
- Poul Bundgaards Vej after Poul Bundgaard
- Poul Reichhardts Vej after Poul Reichhardt
- Tove Maës Vej after Tove Maës

== Transport ==
Valby station is located just north of the area. Vigerslev Allé station is located approximately 500 metres to the west of the area and Copenhagen South railway station is located approximately 900 metres to the south of the area.
