= Vigerslev Allé =

Street in Copenhagen, Denmark

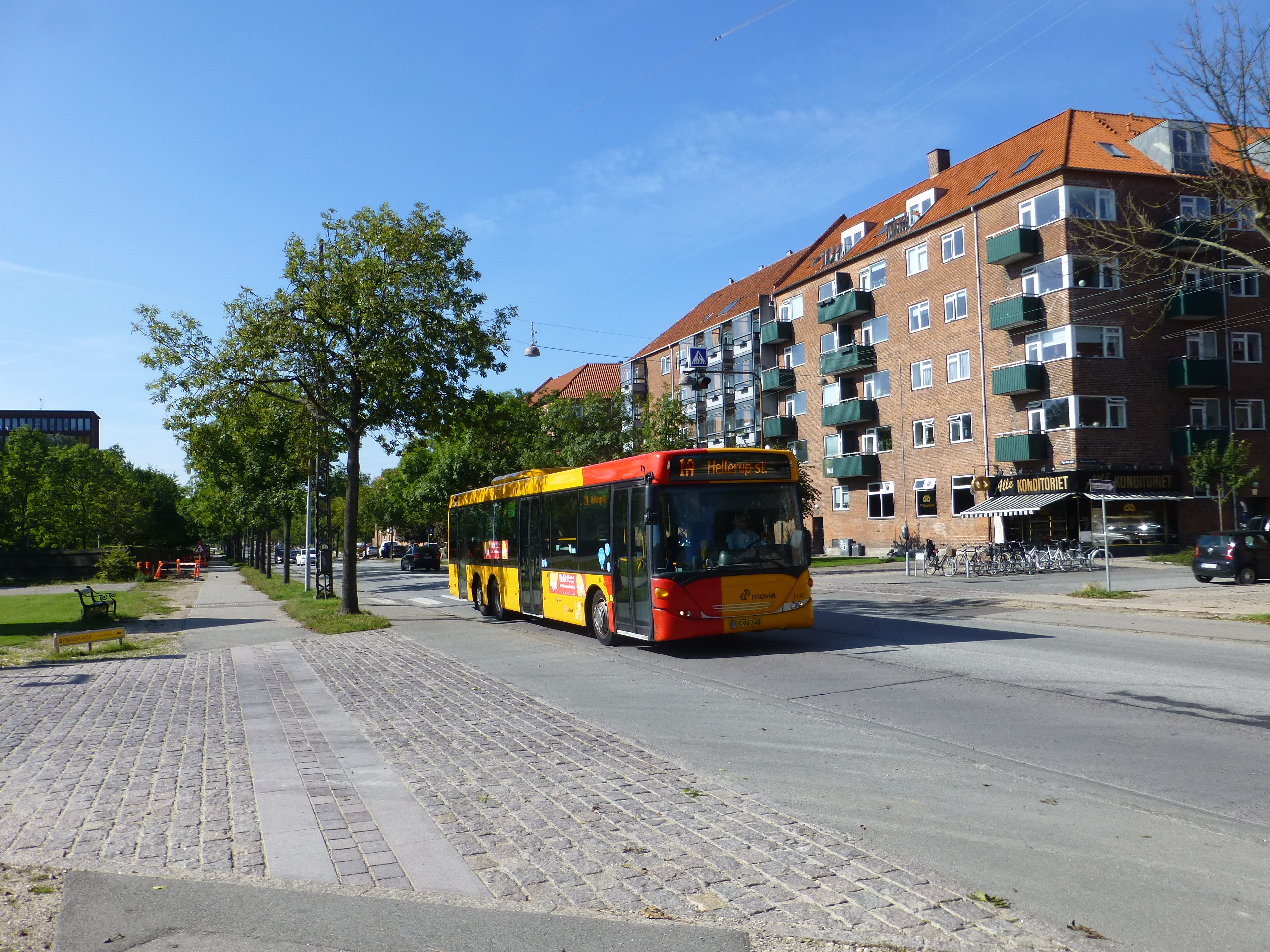
Vigerslev Allé with a Movia bus line 1A

Vigerslev Allé is a major artery in the Valby district of Copenhagen, Denmark. It runs from Enghavevej in the northeast to Hvidovrevej in Hvidovre in the southwest. The first part of the street runs east–west, following the south side of the main railway line through Copenhagen on its way to Toftegårds Plads, the largest square in Valby. It later passes under the S-train network's Ring Line at Vigerslev Allé station before continuing southwest to the Ring 2 ring road just before entering Hvidovre Municipality at Harrestrup Å in Vigerslevparken.

== History ==
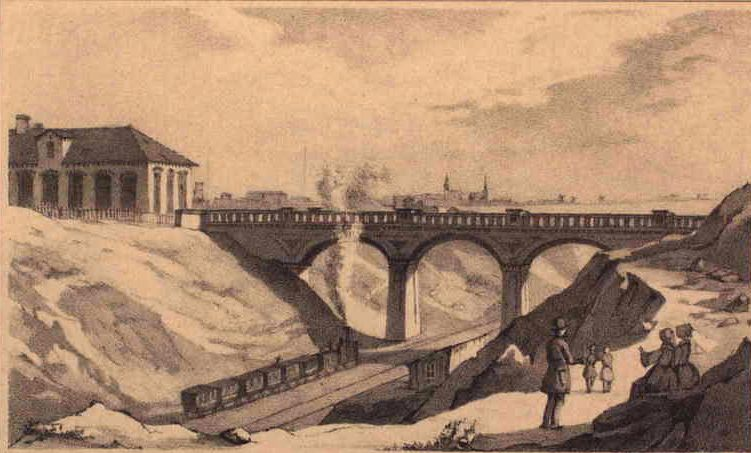
The site with the original Carlsberg Bridge painted by H.G.F. Holm in 1860 before Vigerslev Allé was established

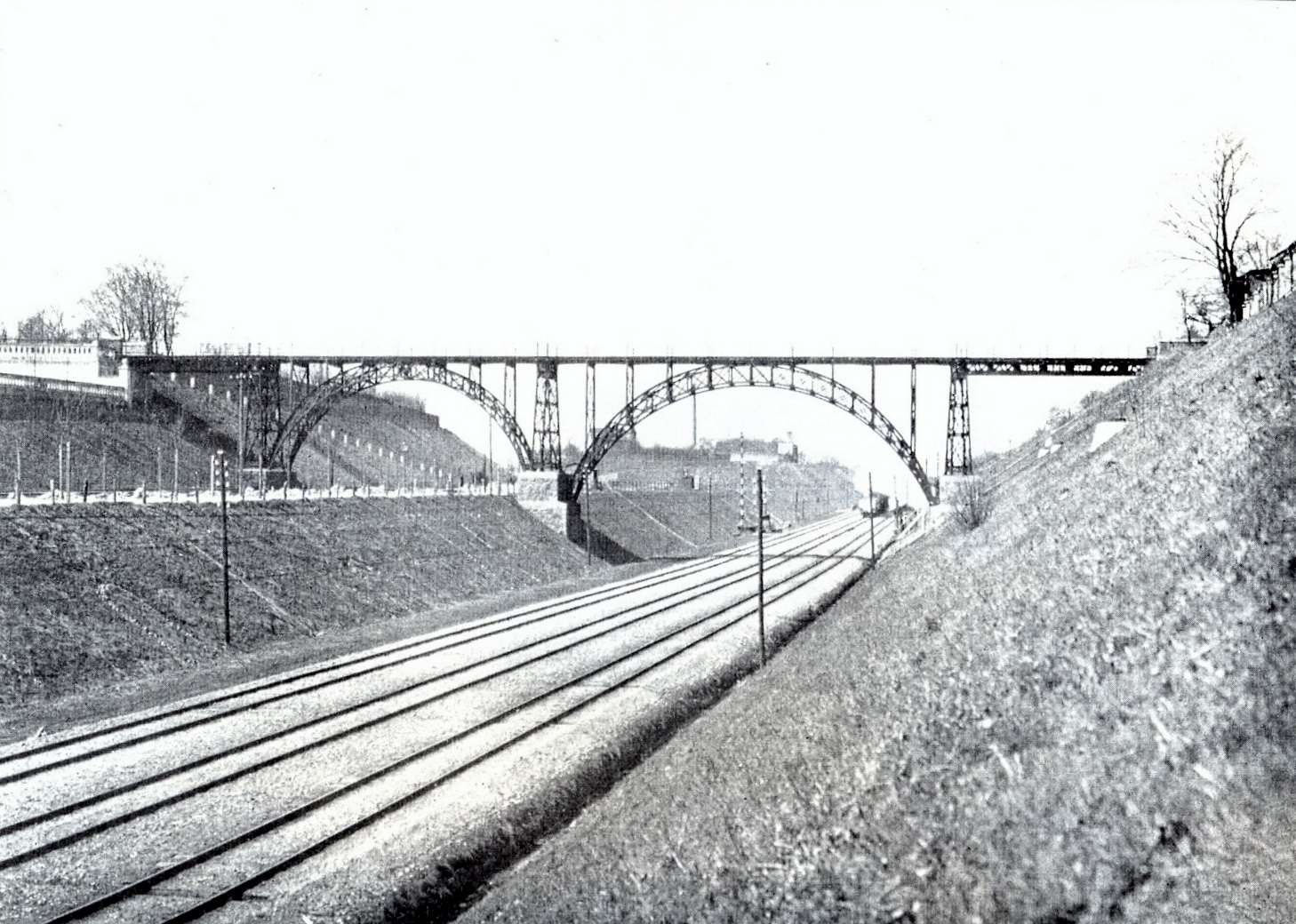
Vigerslev Allé and the Carlsberg Viaduct in 1910

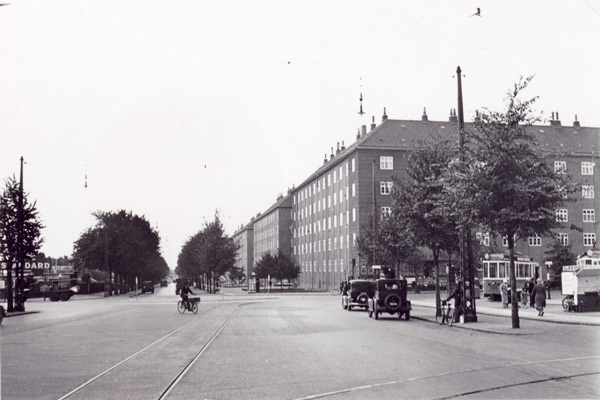
Vigerslev Allé at Toftegårds Plads in 1935, looking west

The first railway line in Denmark between Copenhagen and Roskilde opened in 1947. Its first leg followed present-day Sønder Boulevard and was then dug through Valby Hill on its way to the old village of Vigerslev. J. C. Jacobsen established his Carlsberg Brewert on the north side of the railway when a natural spring was encountered during the excavation work for the rail line. The English railway company also constructed a bridge across the railway next to the brewery.

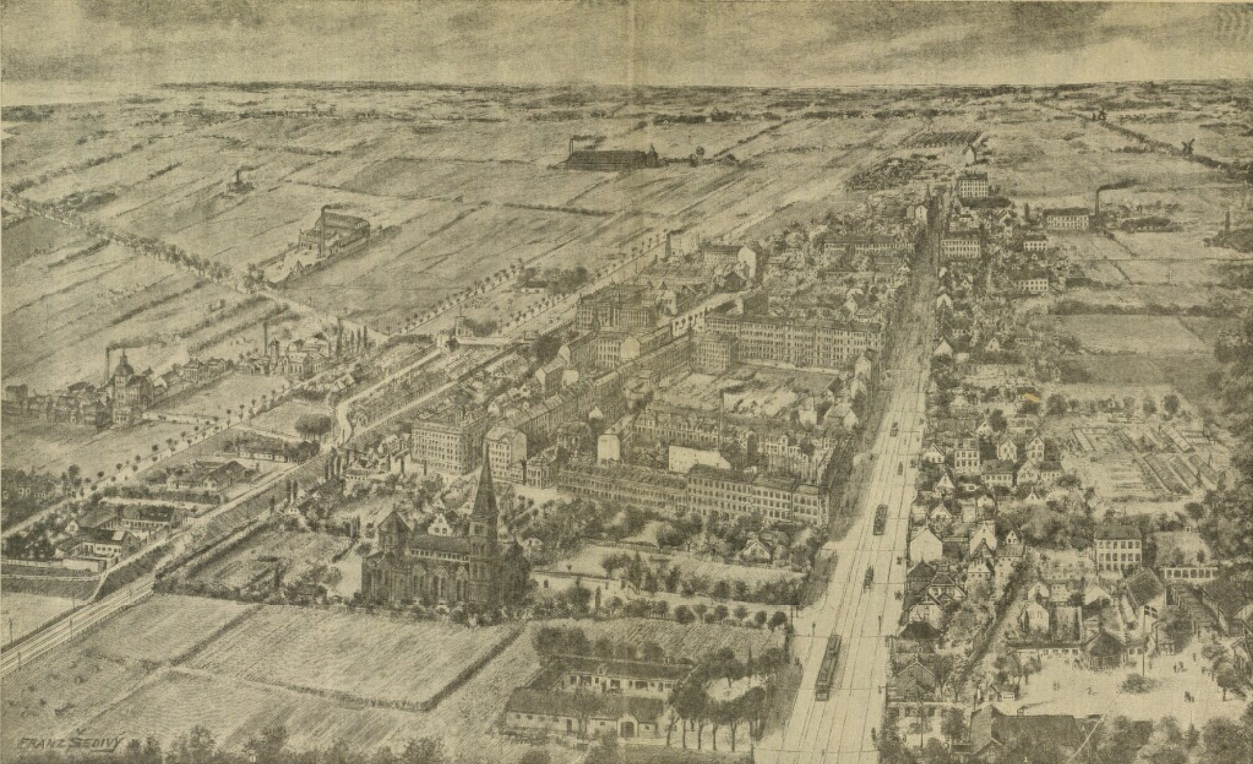
TVigerslev Allé with the F.L. Smidt site

In 1864, the first part of the railway was replaced by a railway line which followed a more northernly course by way of Frederiksberg. The farmers in Bigerslev then used the abandoned railway tracks to drive their cattle into Copenhagen. In 1897 the old railway was reopened and used for transporting materials from the quarries at Hedehusene to the reclamation of what is now Kalvebod Brygge. Vigerslev Allé was established on the south side of the railway when it was expanded into a four-track rail line following the completion of the work on Kalvebod Brygge.

The now demolished Valby Gasworks was built on Vigerslev Allé between 1903 and 1907. It was designed by Andreas Fussing. Another demolished building on the street is Carl Aller's printing business from 1936 to 1938.

== Notable buildings and residents ==
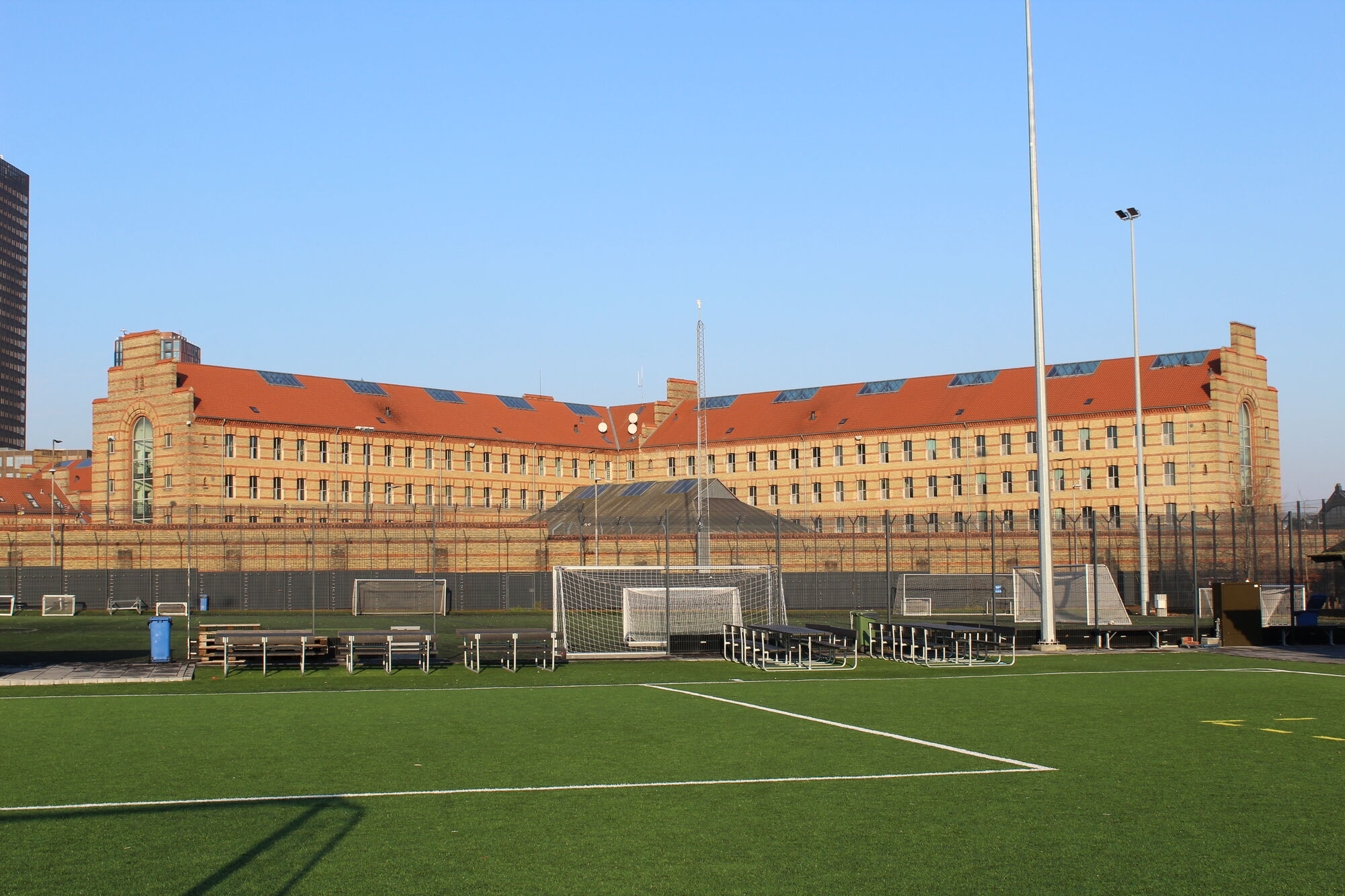
Western Prison.

At the beginning of the street, with entrance from Enghavevej, is a former tramway depot. It now houses Copenhagen Skatepark and StreetMekka, an indoor skateboarding venue and a centre for street culture. Next to it is the entrance to the Vestre Fængsel state prison (Vigerslev Allé 1 D). It was built between 1892 and 1895 to design by Ludvig Fenger and Ludvig Claussen. To the west of the prison site is the 11-storey hall of residence Otto Mønsteds Kollegium (Rektorparken 1).

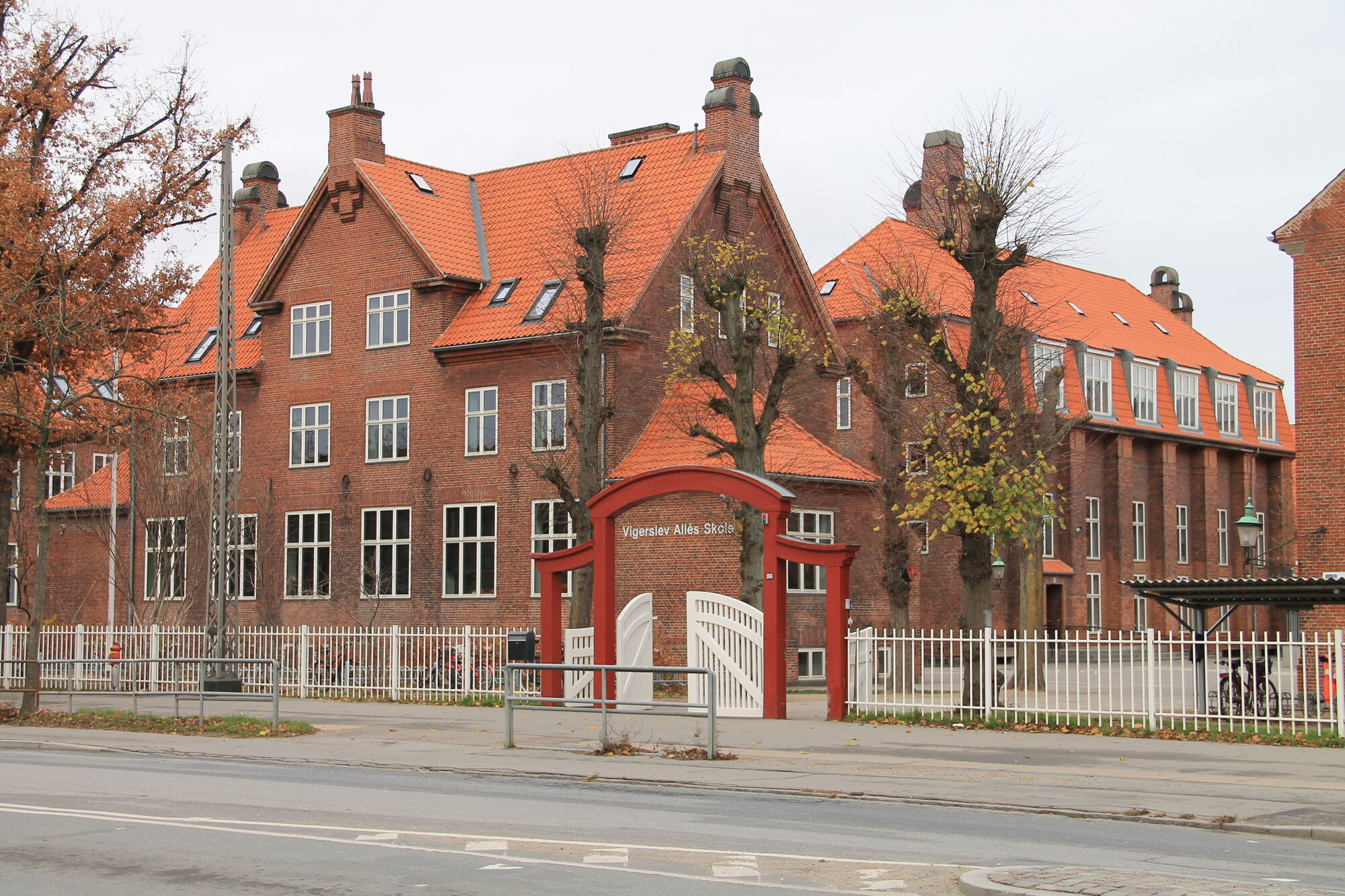
Vigerslev Allé School.

The Copenhagen Hospitality College (No. 18) is the largest school of its kind in the Nordic countries.. The building is the former headquarters of Aller Media (originally Carl Allers Etablissement A/S). It is from 1945 to 1952 and was adapted for its current use by KSH Arkitekter in 2012.

A number of sober apartment blocks in red brick line the north side of the street on both sides of Toftsgårds Plads (Toftegaards Plads 1-5- Lyshøj Allé 1-13- Vigerslev Allé 58-74- Aarestrupsvej 1-7 and 2-6- Overskousvej 1-7 and 2–8). They are from 1921 to 1924 and were designed by Rolf Schroeader with Frederik Wagner as executing architect. The Vestergaarden housing estate (Vigerslev Allé/Kjeldsgårdsvej/Lyshøjgårdvej), on its south side, is from 1931 designed by Arthur Wittmaack. The area between Kærskiftevej, Vigerslev Allé and Vigerslevvej is the site of a development of one-storey row houses from 1939. It was designed by Ivar Bentsen in collaboration with Ole Buhl and T. Miland.

The FLSmidth headquarters (No. 77) is from 1957 and was designed by Palle Suenson. The 10 hectare FL Schmidt site on the corner of Vigerslev Allé with Gammel Køge Landevej is under redevelopment into a new neighbourhood known as Valby Maskinfabrik. It will consist of approximately 1,000 apartments, 35,000 square metres offices and 5,000 square metres retail space.

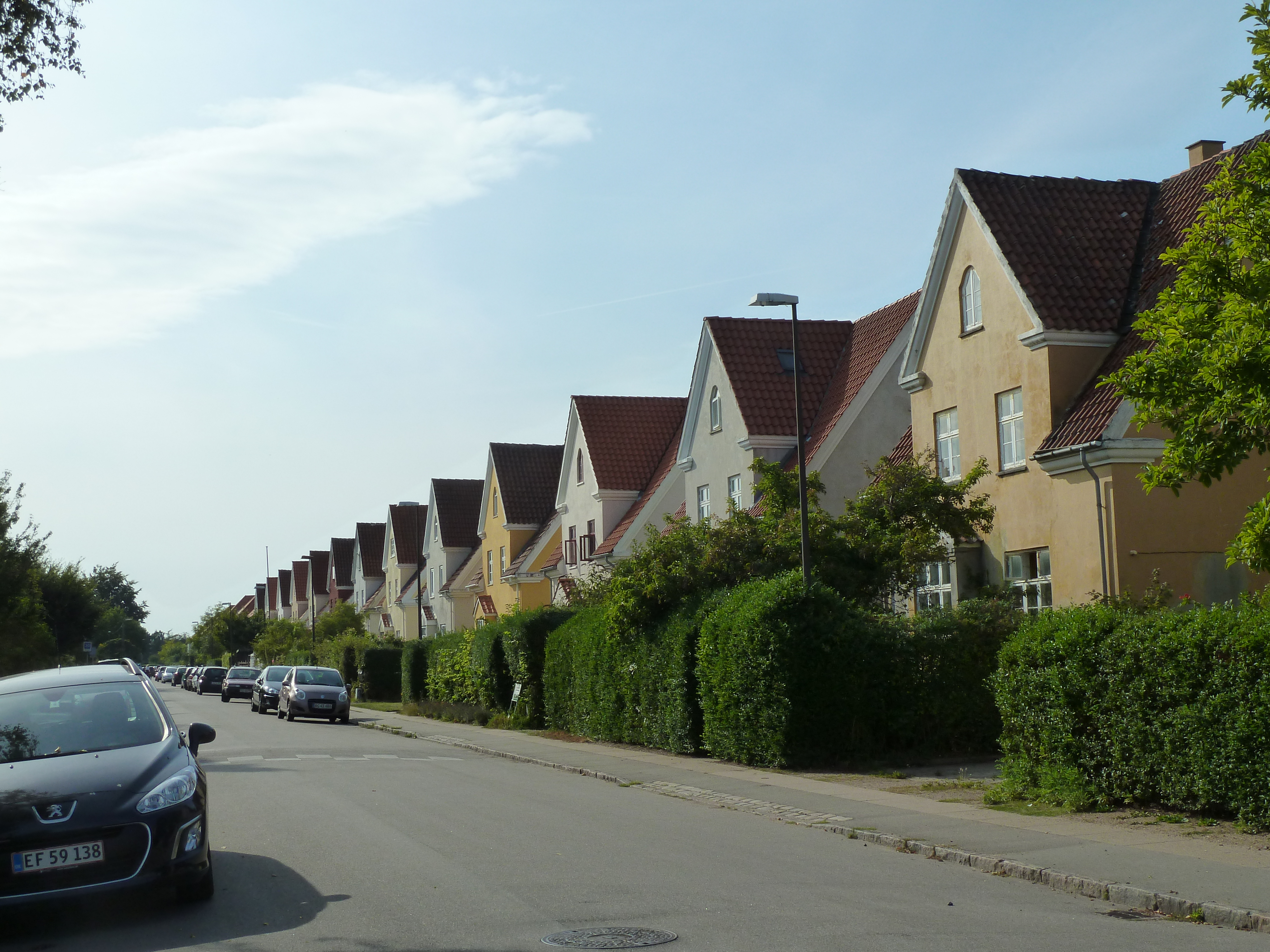
A row of houses at Carl Langes Vej

The public primary school Vigerslev Allés Skole is located at No. 108. It opened in 1910 and was expanded in 1966. To the west of the school, on both sides of Gabersvej, is a development of building society houses known as Lyset ("The Light"). The just over 100 houses were built in the 1910s at the initiative of employees at Copenhagen's tramways to provide modern and healthy homes outside the dense inner city for the members.

Solgavehjemmet (No. 117) is a hall of residence for blind students from 1961. The buildings were designed by Palle Suenson.

== Transport ==
Valby station is located on the north side of the street close to Toftegårds Plads.

Carlsberg station, a station on the Høje Taastrup radial of the S-train network, is located at the beginning of the street. It is served by the B, C and H trains. Vigerslev Allé station (Vigerslev Allé 141) is located on the S-train network's Ring Line and is served by the F trains.

== Cultural references ==
Vigerslev Allé is used as a location at 0:39:04 and 0:39:34 in the 1969 Olsen-banden film The Olsen Gang in a Fix.
