= E (S-train) =

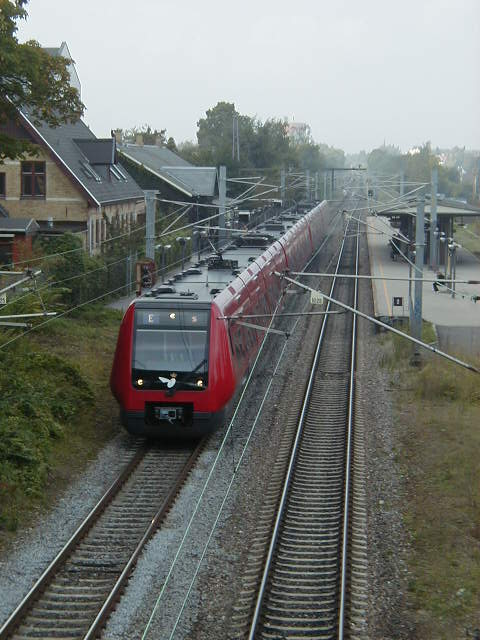
- E train at Gentofte station

Overview
- Status: Operational
- Owner: Banedanmark
- Locale: Copenhagen metropolitan area
- Termini: Holte station; Køge station
- Stations: 27

Service
- Type: Suburban rail, urban rail
- System: S-train
- Operator(s): DSB
- Rolling stock: Litra SA and SE

History
- Opened: 26 May 1968; 57 years ago

Technical
- Line length: 57.9 km (36.0 mi)
- Track gauge: 1,435 mm (4 ft 8 1/2 in) standard gauge
- Operating speed: 120 km/h (75 mph)

E is a service on the S-train network in Copenhagen. It runs between Køge and Holte, serving the outer end of the Køge radial and the inner part of the Hillerød radial. The A service serves the complementary parts of each radial, and both lines serves all stations on the central part between Ny Ellebjerg and Hellerup.

Trains run on weekdays only, every 20 minutes from about 5:00 to 6:00 and every 10 minutes about 6:00 to 20:00.

S-train system map

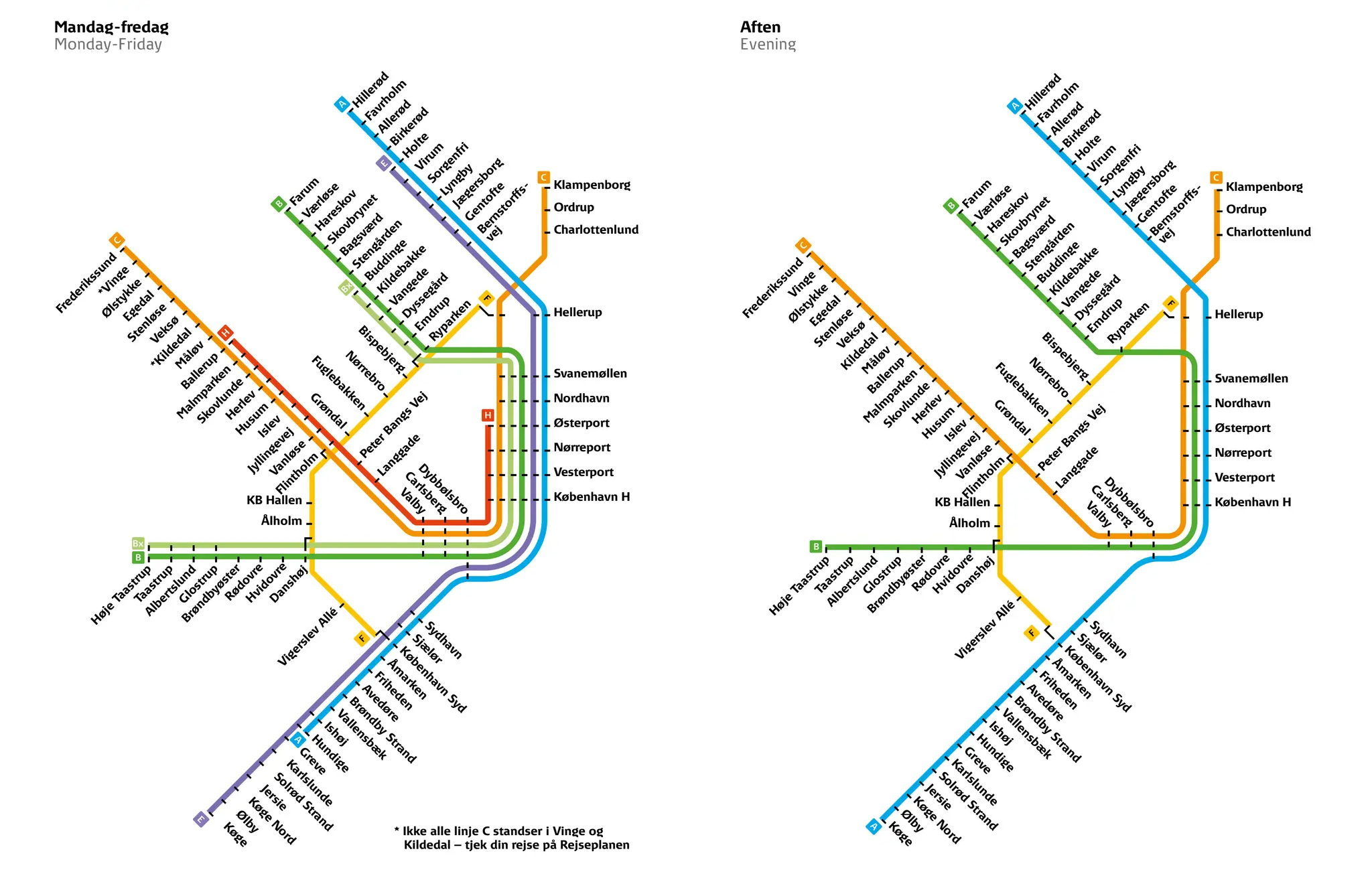
S-train system map

== History ==
Service E is the continuation of the "fast" steam trains that ran between Copenhagen and Hillerød since the late 19th century. They acquired a service letter when they were replaced by S-trains in 1986. Later the main characteristic of service E came to be serving the outer end of the Køge radial.

=== BO ===
Date	Line layout	Notes
28-09-1969	Glostrup - Copenhagen H	Non-stop Valby-Copenhagen H. From Glostrup in the morning and to Glostrup in the afternoon.
31-05-1970	(Taastrup -) Glostrup - Copenhagen H	Non-stop Valby-Copenhagen H. From Taastrup in the morning and to Glostrup in the afternoon.
01-10.1972	Line BO was a part of, Discontinued and replaced by extension of Line	

Name	Southern end	Years	Northern end
	terminated at København H	1968–1972	Nordbanen: to Hillerød; non-stop Østerport-Holte
	Vestbanen: to Taastrup Mo-Sa; non-stop until Valby	1972–1973	Nordbanen: to Hillerød; non-stop Østerport-Holte
	as above, but only Mo-Fr daytime	1973–1979	Nordbanen: to Hillerød; non-stop Østerport-Holte
	Køgebugtbanen: to Solrød Strand Mo-Fr daytime; non-stop until Hundige	1979–1983	Nordbanen: to Hillerød; non-stop Østerport-Holte
	to Køge, non-stop København H-Sjælør-Hundige	1983–1989	Nordbanen: to Hillerød; non-stop Østerport-Holte
	as above, plus stop at Ishøj	1989–1991	to Hellerup; Mo-Sa daytime extended to Hillerød, non-stop until Holte
	as above, plus stop at Ishøj	1991–2002	as above, plus stop at Lyngby
	as above, plus stop at Friheden	2002–2005	as above, plus stop at Lyngby
	as above, plus stop at Friheden	2006	as above except to Lyngby when not going to Hillerød
	as above, plus stop at Ny Ellebjerg	2007	as above except to Lyngby when not going to Hillerød
	to Køge, non-stop Ny Ellebjerg - Ishøj	Sep 2007-2011	as above; all trains continue to Hillerød
	as above, plus stop at Friheden	2011-2014	as above; all trains continue to Hillerød
	as above, plus stop at Friheden	2014-	trains terminate at Holte

An Ex service first ran from 1968, but was fused with service Cx in 1972. A new Ex line started in 1983 servicing the Køge radial.

Name	Southern end	Years	Northern end
Ex	terminated at København H	1968–1972	Nordbanen: to Hillerød, non-stop Østerport - Birkerød
superseded by Cx
Ex	Køgebugtbanen: to Køge, non-stop København H - Sjælør - Hundige	1983–1986	terminated at København H
Ex	as above, plus stop in Ishøj	1986–1989	terminated at København H
Ex	as above, plus all stops until Sjælør	1989–1995	terminated at Hellerup
Ex	to Solrød Strand, non-stop København H - Sydhavn - Friheden - Ishøj	1995–1998	non-stop Østerport - Hellerup
Ex	as above except no stop at Sydhavn	1998–2004	all stops to Hellerup
Ex	from Køge station, non-stop Ishøj - Sjælør - København H	2005–2006	terminates at Østerport
Ex	as above, plus stop at Ny Ellebjerg	2007	terminates at Østerport
Discontinued from September 2007

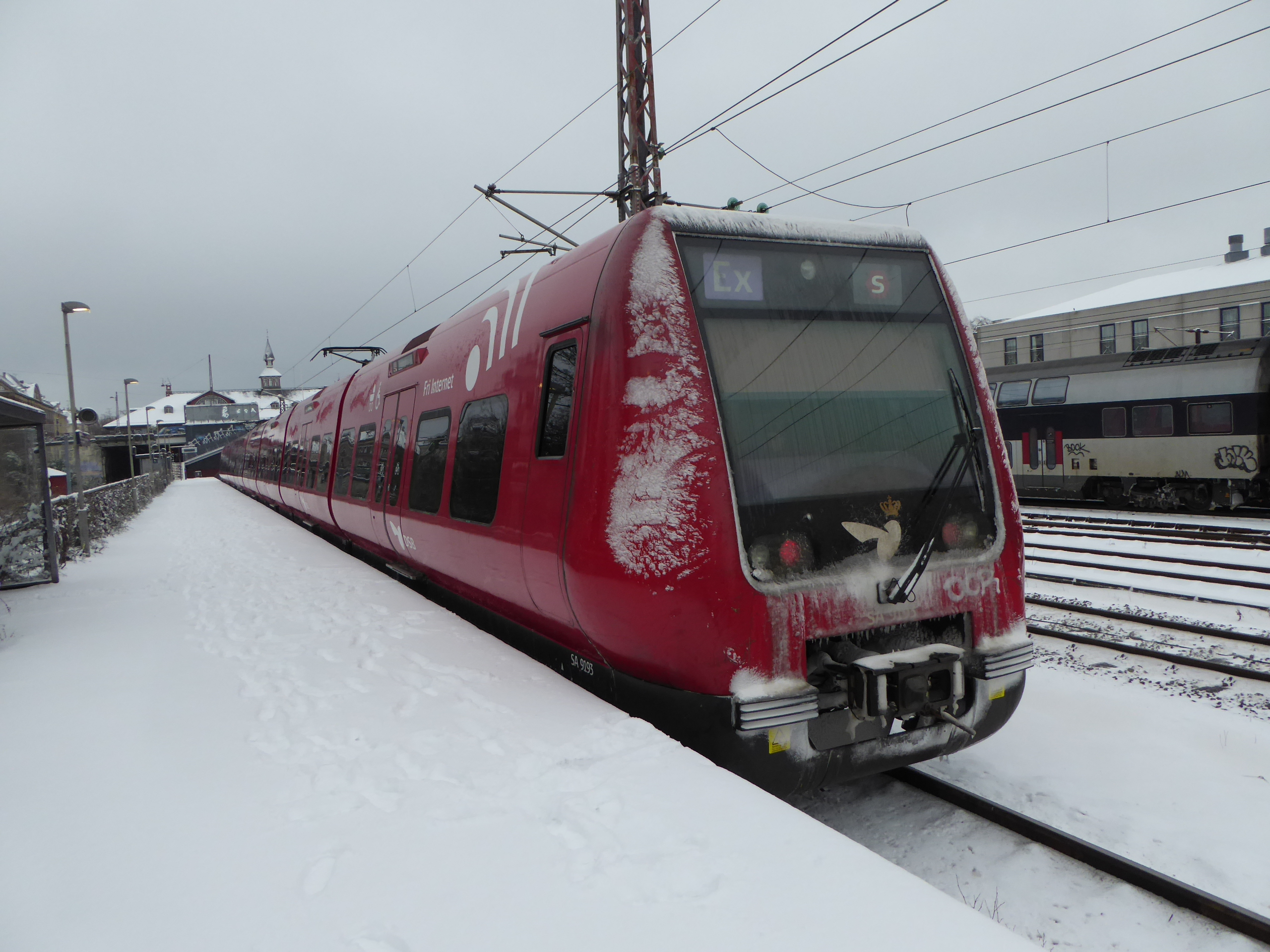
Line Ex was closed, but the S-trains' roll film could still show it. Ex at Østerport Station in 2007.

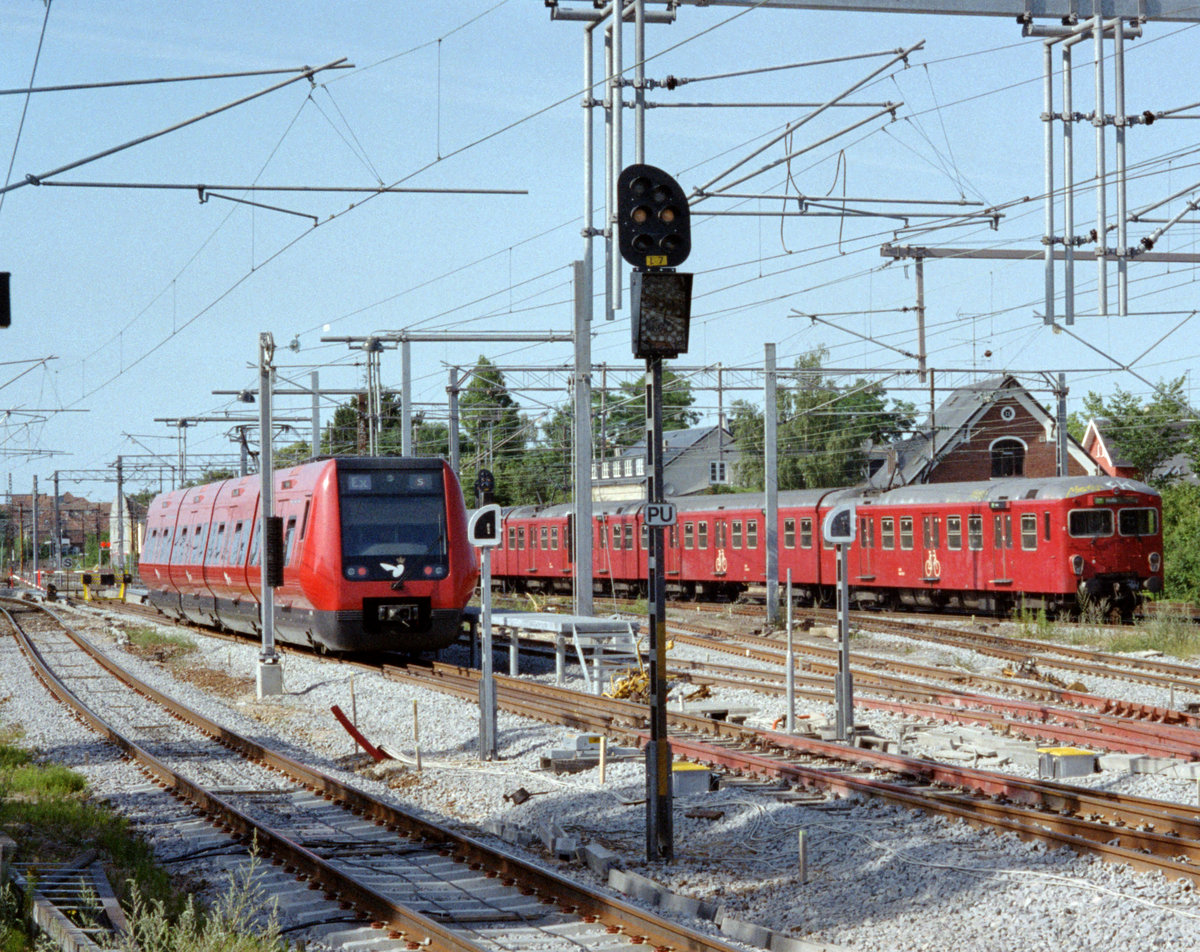
Line Ex and line B+ at Hellerup Station in 2006.

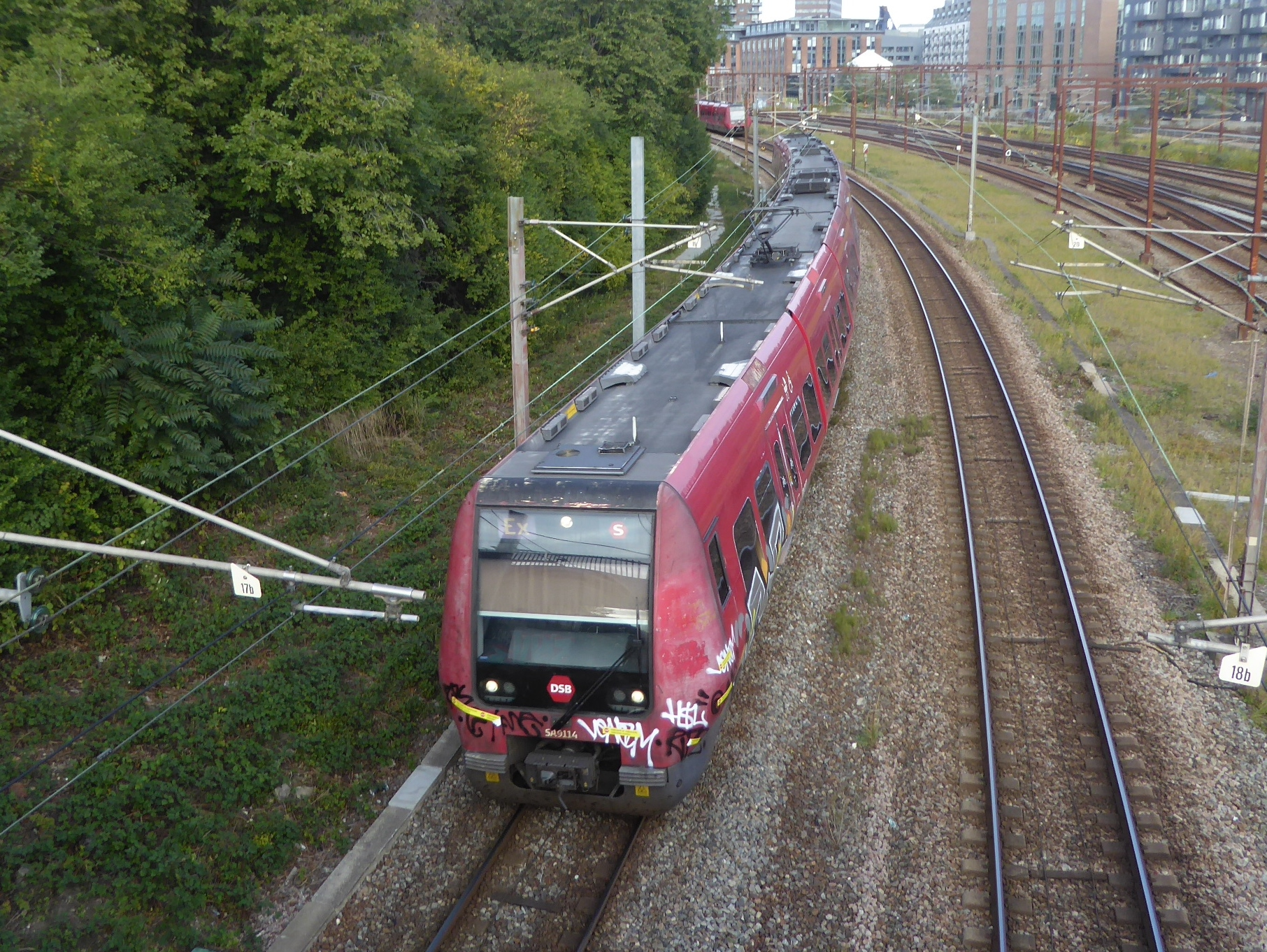
Line Ex arriving at Østerport Station in 2007.

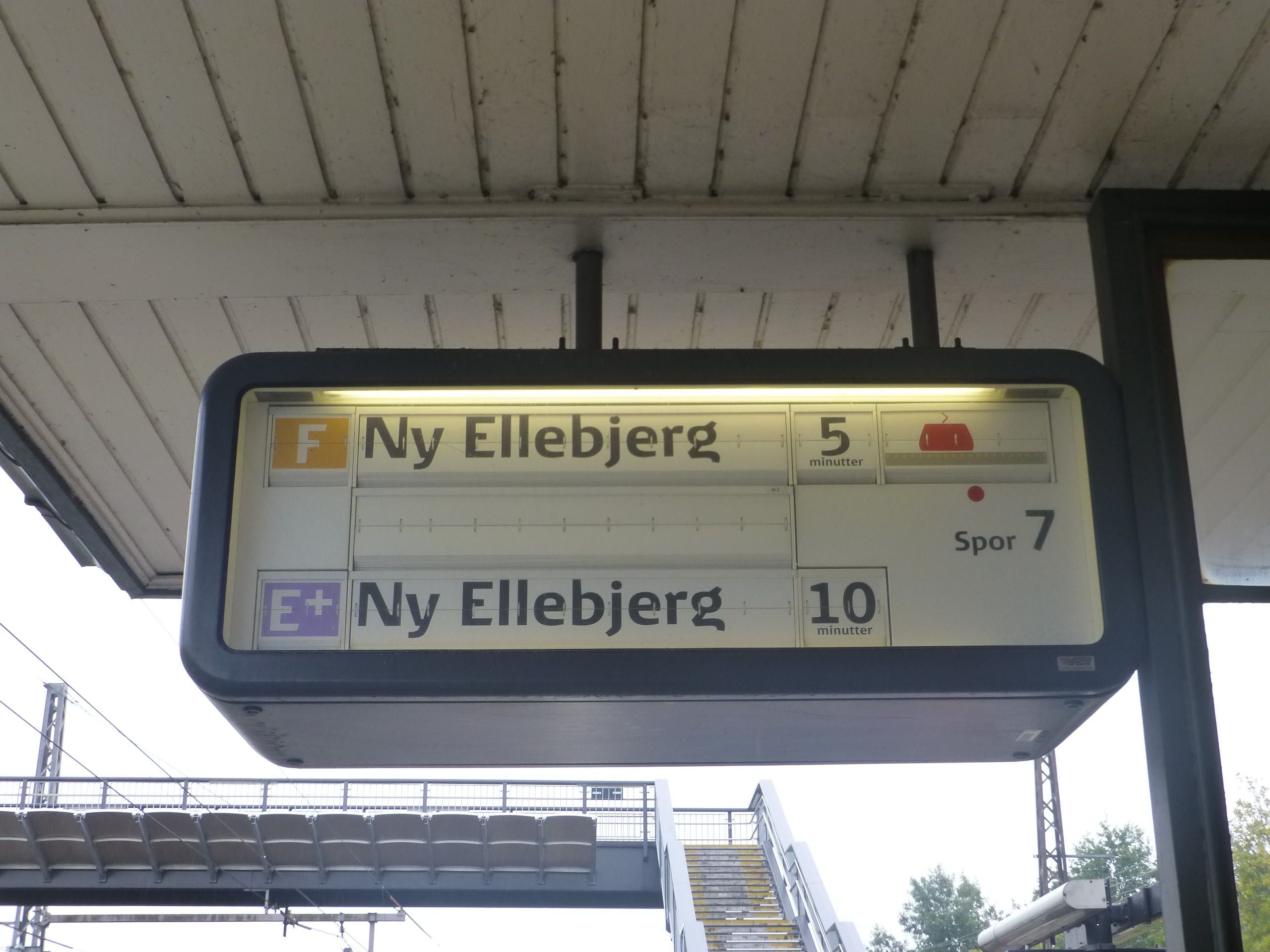
Incorrect signage in Hellerup. In 2002, it was considered to rename line A+ to E+, but only the flap signs were prepared.
