= Carl Jacobsens Vej =

Street in Copenhagen, Denmark

Coordinates: 55.6529°N 12.5197°E

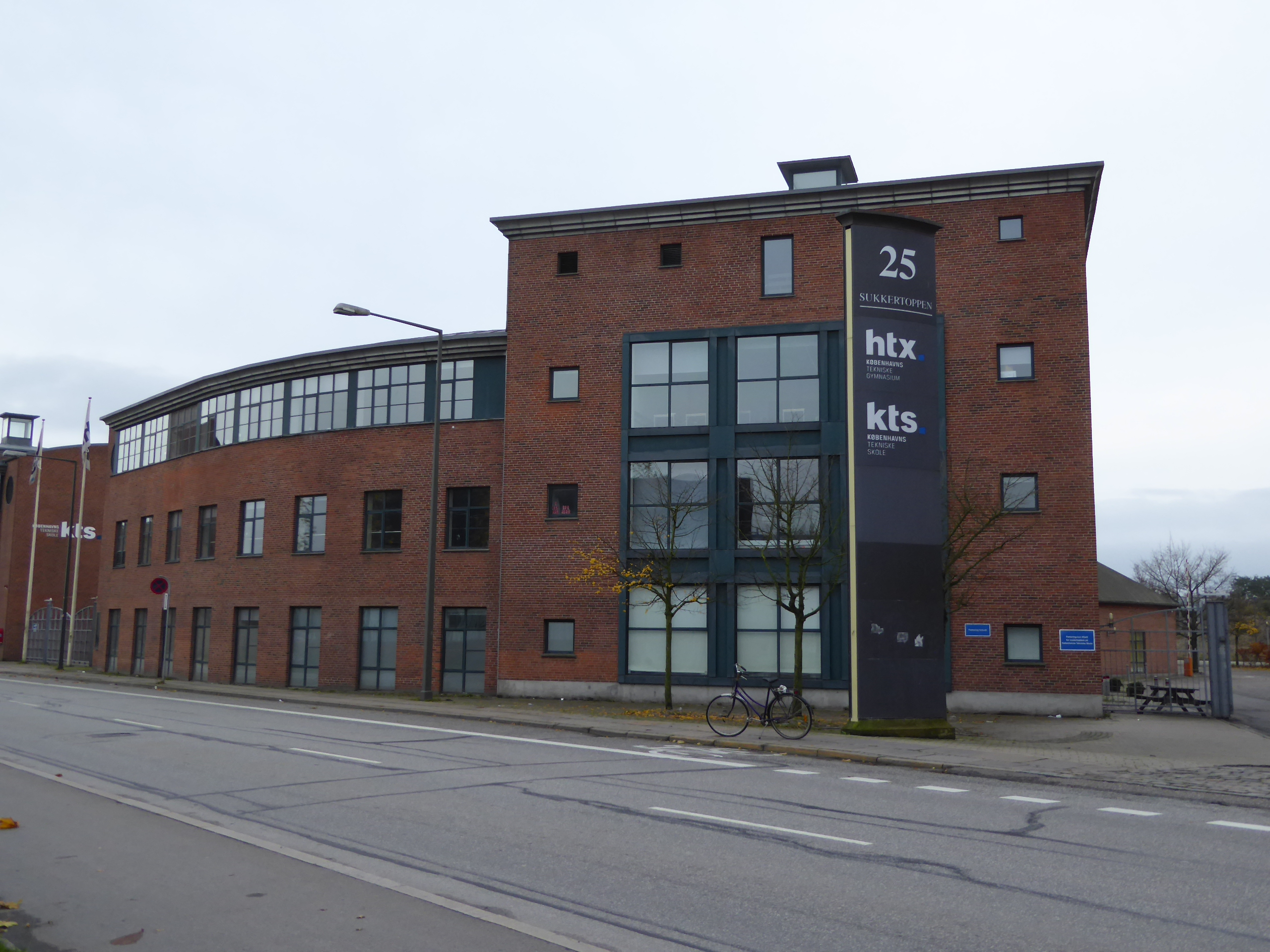
Educational complex on Carl Jacobsens Vej

Carl Jacobsens Vej is a street in the Valby district of Copenhagen, Denmark. It runs from Sjælør Boulevard on the rear side of Vestre Cemetery in the east to Gammel Køge Landevej in the west. The street is lined by a mixture of converted industrial complexes from the beginning of the 20th century, building society developments and modern apartment buildings from the 2010s.

== History ==
Carl Jacobsens Vej is the backbone of an industrial zone which developed along the north side of a freight railway line opened in 1909. Many of the factories had short railway arms providing them with direct access to the railway network.

There were plans to replace many of the industrial buildings with modern offices in the 1980s but the plans were given up after public opposition. The buildings were instead adapted for other use.

Carl Hacobsens Vej developed into a popular location for art galleries and creative businesses in the 2000s, but most of the art galleries moved closer to the city centre during the 2008 financial crisis. In 2010, Carl Hacobsen was subject to extensive redevelopment with many new apartment buildings.

== Notable buildings and residents ==
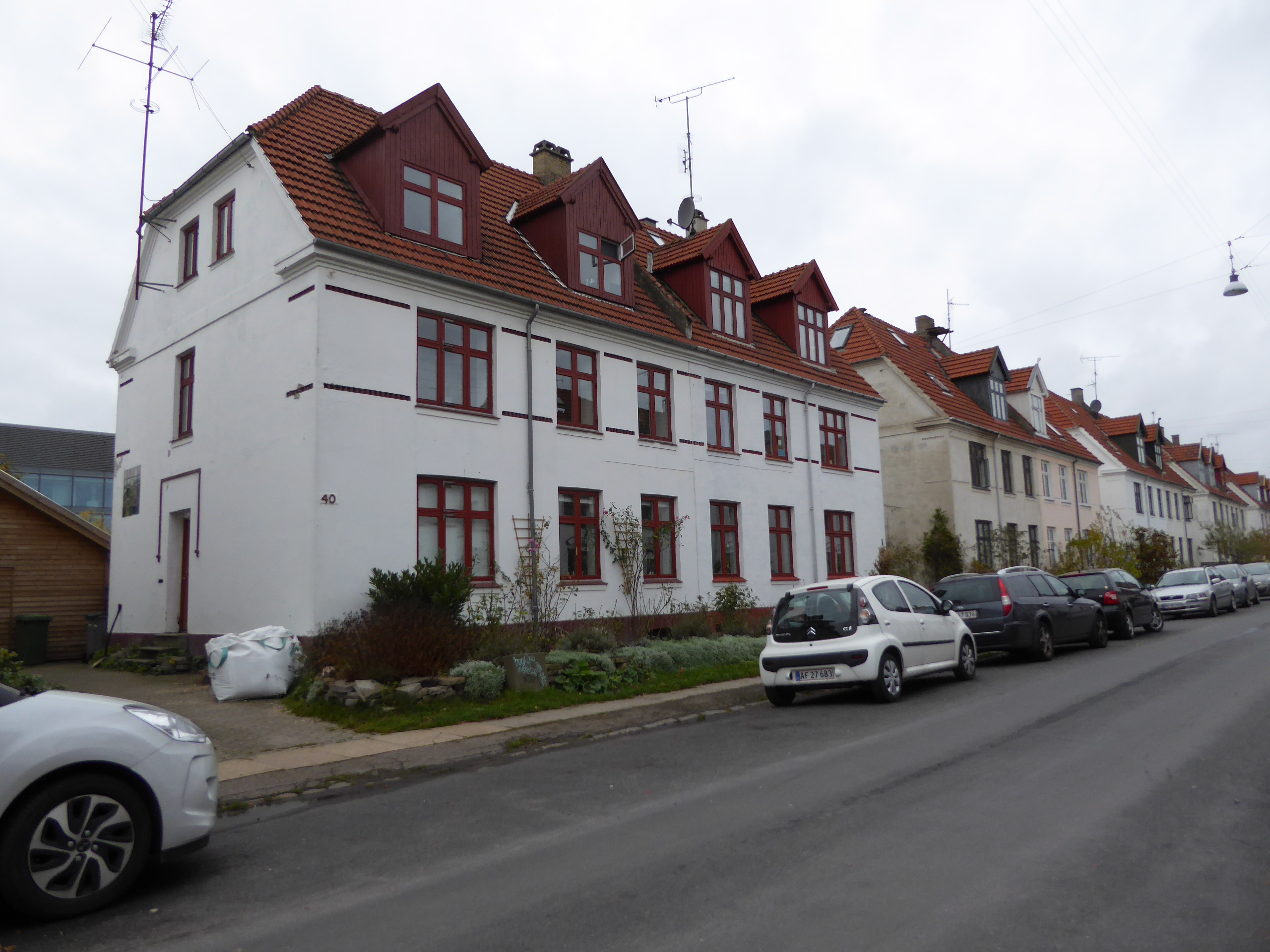
Building society houses on Kløberbladsgade

On the north side of Carl Jacobsens Vej is a development of building society houses built by Frederiksberg Arbejders Boligforening (Frederiksberg Workers' Building Society) for blue and white collar workers at the nearby Carlsberg and Trekroner breweries in 1902–05. It consists of 26 houses located on Karensgade, Gerdasgade, Kløverbladsgade and Trekronergade. They were designed by Ejner Blytmann and originally contained a total of 104 dwellings which has been merged into half as many in connection with a renovation.

The Kløverbladsgade Building, now home to Bjarke Ingels Group

The large industrial complex which extends north along the west side of Kløverbladsgade is the former headquarters of Dansk Pressefabrik from 1923. The factory produced bottle tops both for the beer and dairy industry. Several creative businesses are now headquartered in the complex, including the architectural firm Bjarke Ingels Group. The building is owned by DADES.

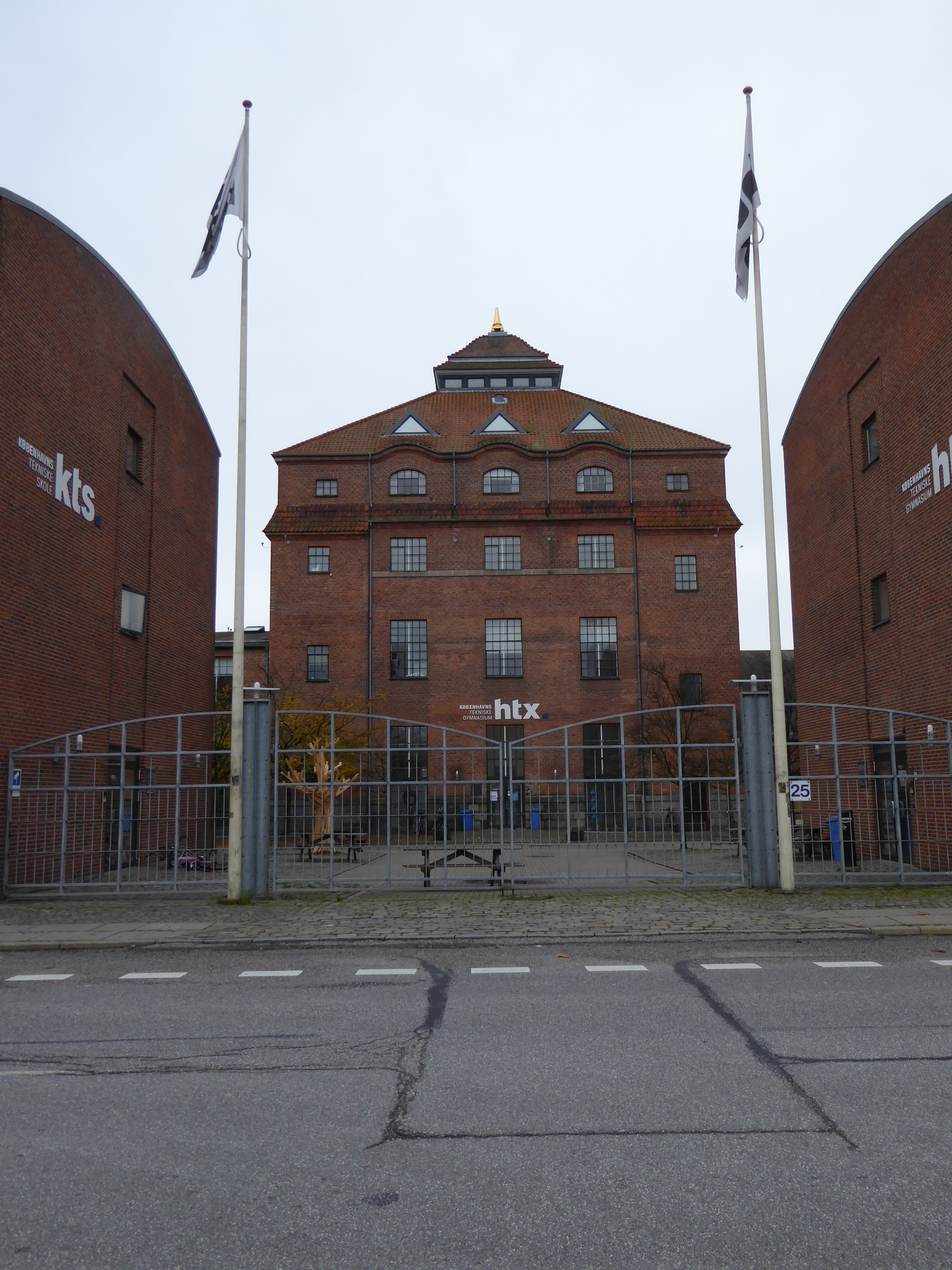
The Sukkertoppen Building

The former premises of Københavns Sukkerfafinaderi (Mo. 25), a sugar refinery from 1913–14, are now known as Sukkertoppen. Its Gründerzeit buildings were designed by Arthur Wittmaack were adapted for use by Copenhagen Technical College by Kristian Isager in 1991. A four-story high, covered rambla connects the old and new buildings. The artist Henning Dangaard-Sørensen has created artworks for the complex.

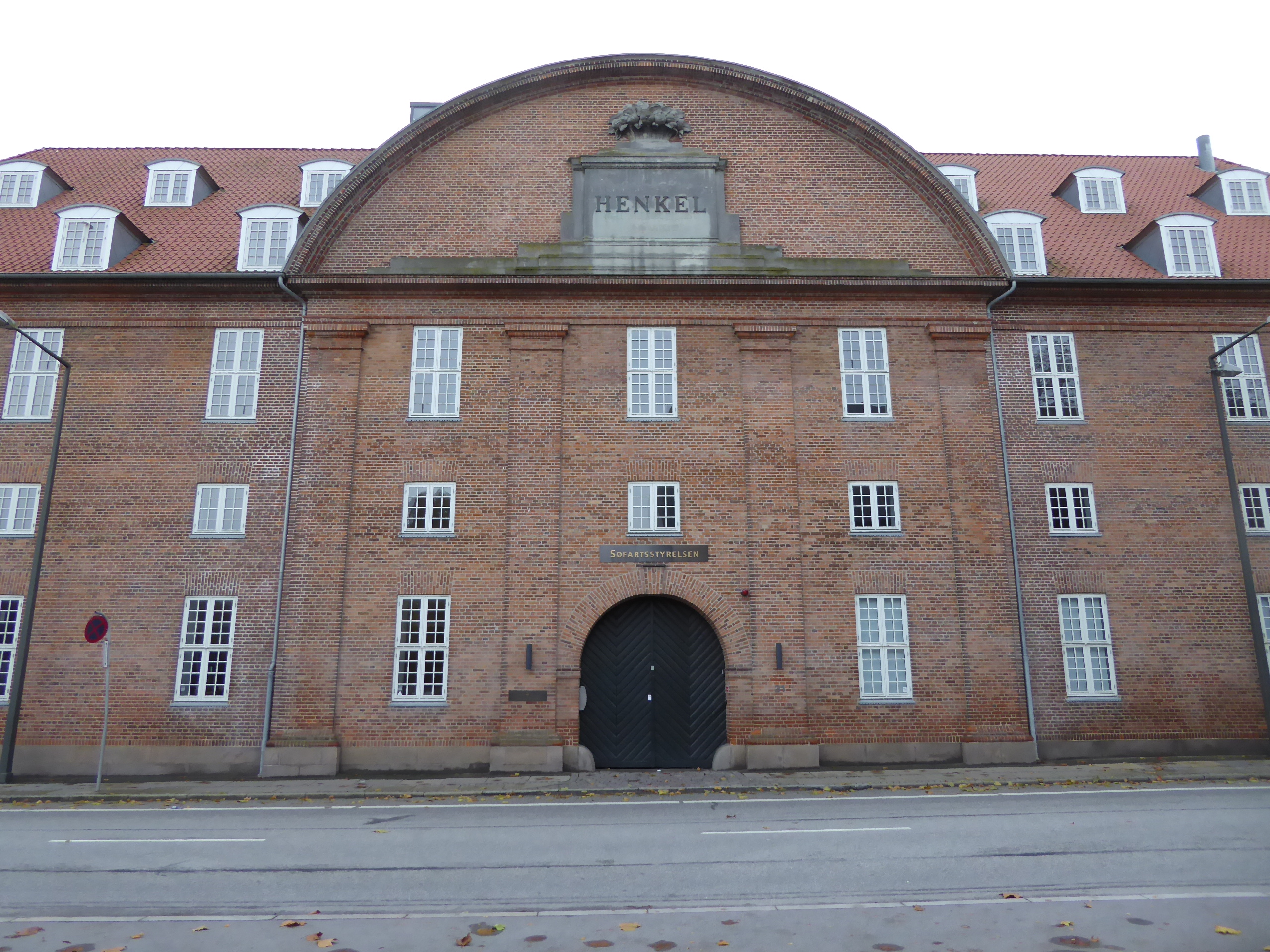
Henkel's former main building

No. 29-37 is the former premises of Scandinavian Henkel. Henkel's old Neo-Baroque main building with its large, rounded pediment was originally built for Skandinavisk Frøkompagni in 1918–19 to design by Ole Falkentorp and F. Freese. It is attached to a former warehouse from 1930 and an administration building from 1938. It has housed the Danish Maritime Authority. To the rear is a large, four-story factory building attached to a watertower to the northeast. It is still used by the Henkel subsidiary Ecolab is still using the factory buildings.

New buildings include an apartment building at No. 16 by Vilhelm Lauritzen Architects (2015).

== Transport ==
Sjælør station is located just south of the beginning of the street. Ny Ellebjerg station is located a little to the south of the central part of the street.
