= Valby Gasworks =

Gasworks in Copenhagen, Denmark

Coordinates: 55.6578°N 12.4944°E

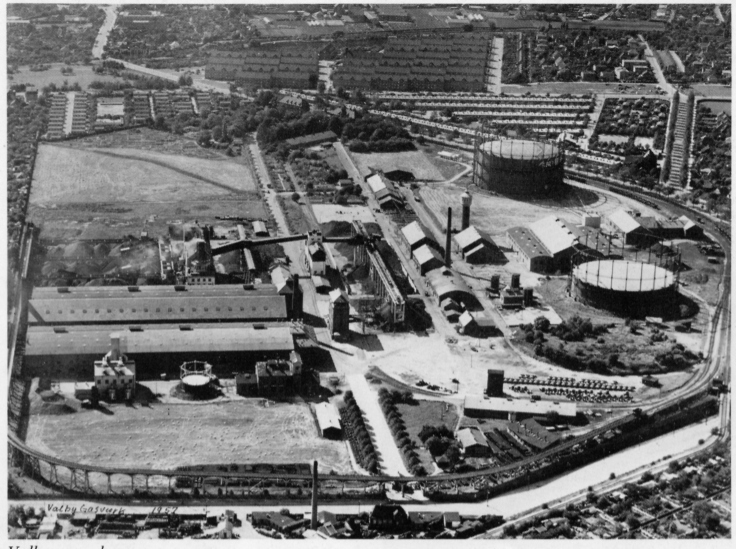
Valby Gasworks, 1952

Valby Gasworks was a former gasworks between Vigerslev Allé and Retortvej in the Copenhagen suburb of Valby. It was one of Denmark's largest gasworks, with a total area of 270,000 m^{2} (2,900,000 sq ft). It produced coal gas between 1907 and 1963, and from then on was used just for gas storage.

In 1964 the works was destroyed by a powerful gas explosion, causing many injuries and serious damage to the surrounding suburb. The explosion featured in an episode of the series Danmarks katastrofer (Denmark's disasters) by DR.

== Explosion ==
When the works were constructed, they were positioned well outside of the city of Copenhagen for public safety. However, in the postwar years the city rapidly expanded. By the 1960s, the gasworks had been completely surrounded by housing.

On 26 September 1964, at 9:36 a.m., an explosion occurred in the gasworks control house. This was one of the buildings out towards Vigerslev Allé, between the two gasholders. Due to negligent maintenance, the building had been filled with a mixture of air and coal gas, forming a dangerously explosive mix (oxyhydrogen). This was subsequently accidentally ignited by a cigarette or spark. Although the gas mixture was well under 1,000 m^{3} (35,000 cu ft), the building was obliterated, punching holes in both gas holders in the process. Approximately 140,000 m^{3} (4,900,000 cu ft) of gas began to escape, until it too was ignited by the burning building, burning with high flames for a few minutes but without doing any further damage.

The force of the explosion was sufficient such that Copenhagen residents believed an atom bomb had been dropped. Three workers at the gasworks were killed by the explosion, a man in a nearby bakery died of shock, and another man died from falling roof tiles. In total, 200 people were hospitalised. More than 100,000 windows were smashed in a 5 km (3.1 mi) radius from the gasworks, and the explosion caused 35 million kroner in damage, equivalent to 370 million kroner in 2013.

After the explosion, the gasworks – which was only functioning for distribution and storage – was completely closed and leveled by the authorities. Today it is used for housing. Gas storage was moved to a gasholder built nearby on Køgevej.
