= Ellebjerg railway station =

Former railway station in Copenhagen, Denmark

Coordinates: 55°38′58″N 12°30′36″E

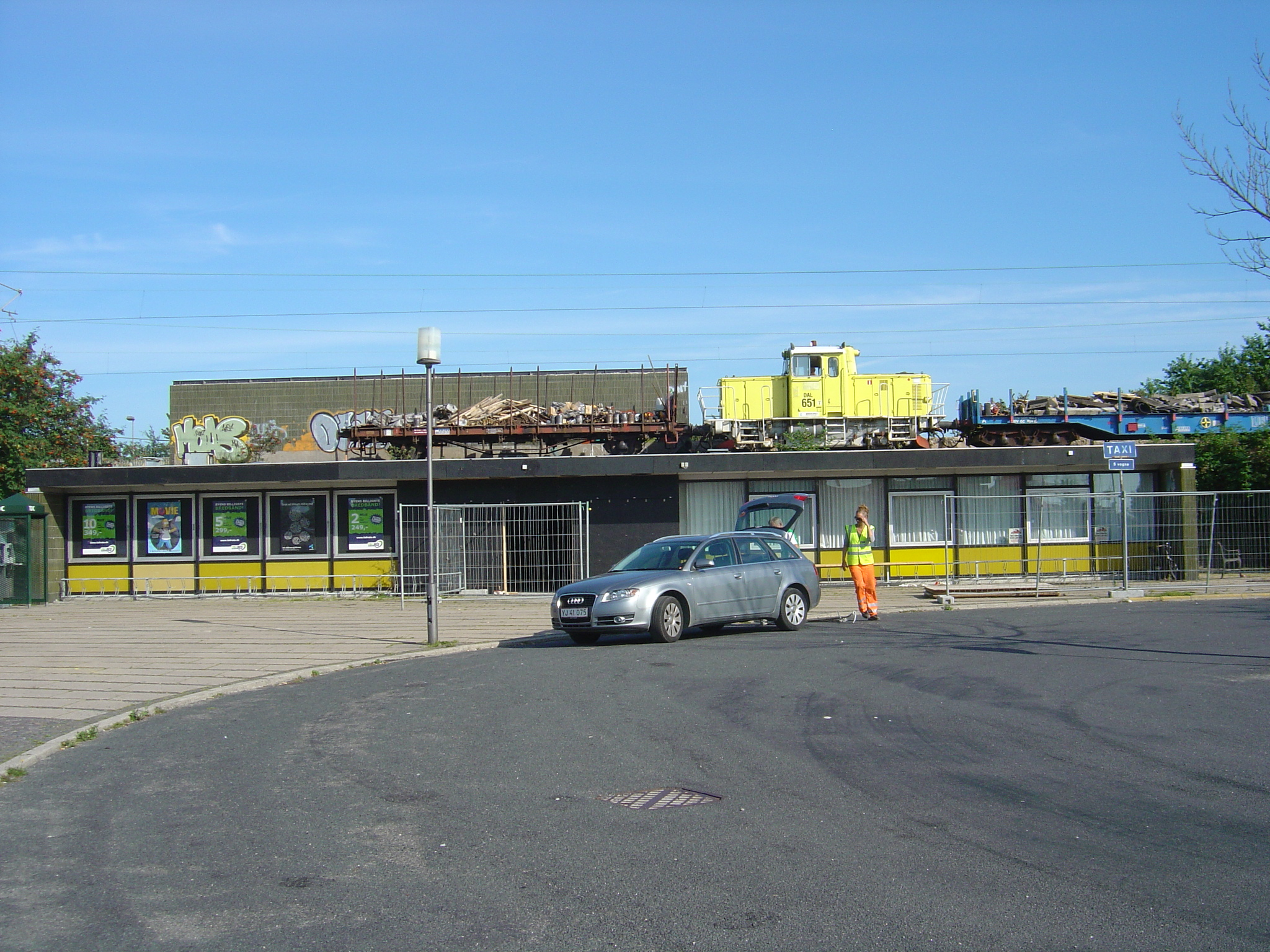
Ellebjerg Station during the demolition process.

Ellebjerg station is a former station on the S-train network in Copenhagen, Denmark. It was in operation from 1972 until its closure in 2007. The former station is located where the Køge radial passes over Ellebjergvej. A new station, Ny Ellebjerg station (Ny meaning "New"), opened on 6 January 2007, a few hundred meters northeast of the former station.

The station was the first station ever to be closed on the S-train network.

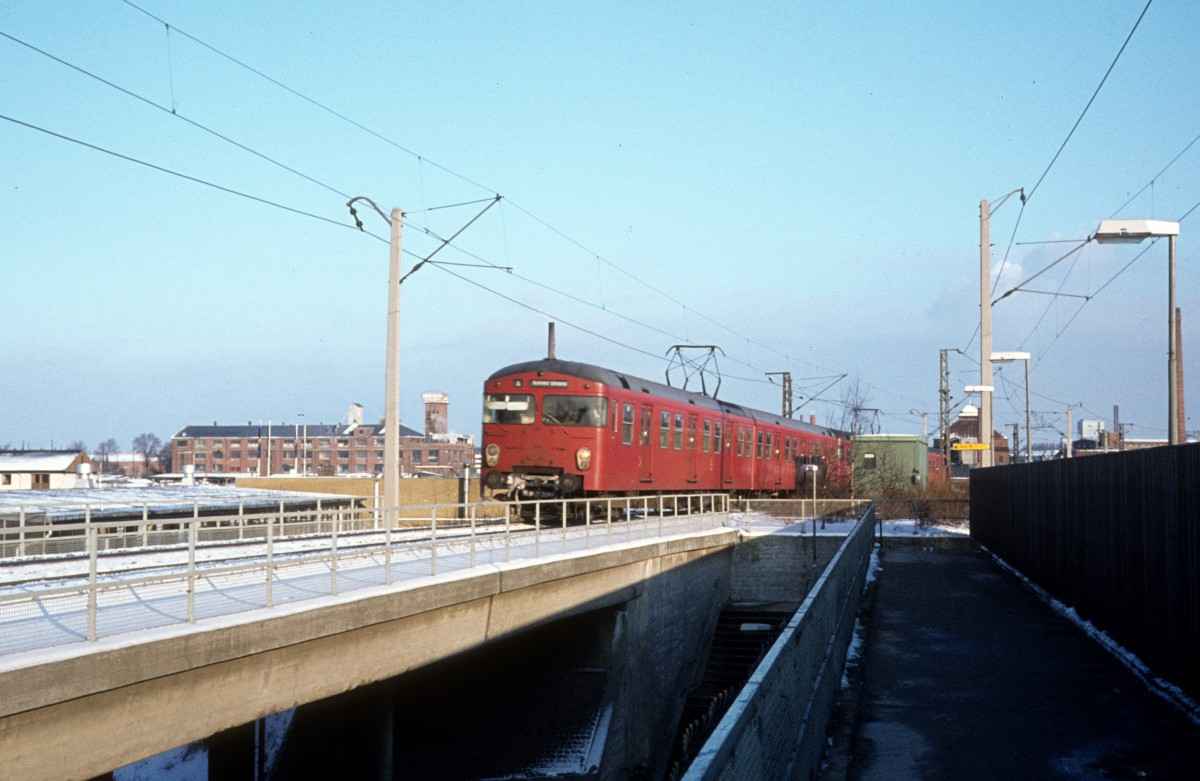
Copenhagen DSB S-Bahn in January 1980: A train of the second material generation on line A near the former Ellebjerg S-Train station.
