= Åmarken railway station =

Commuter railway station in Greater Copenhagen, Denmark

Åmarken
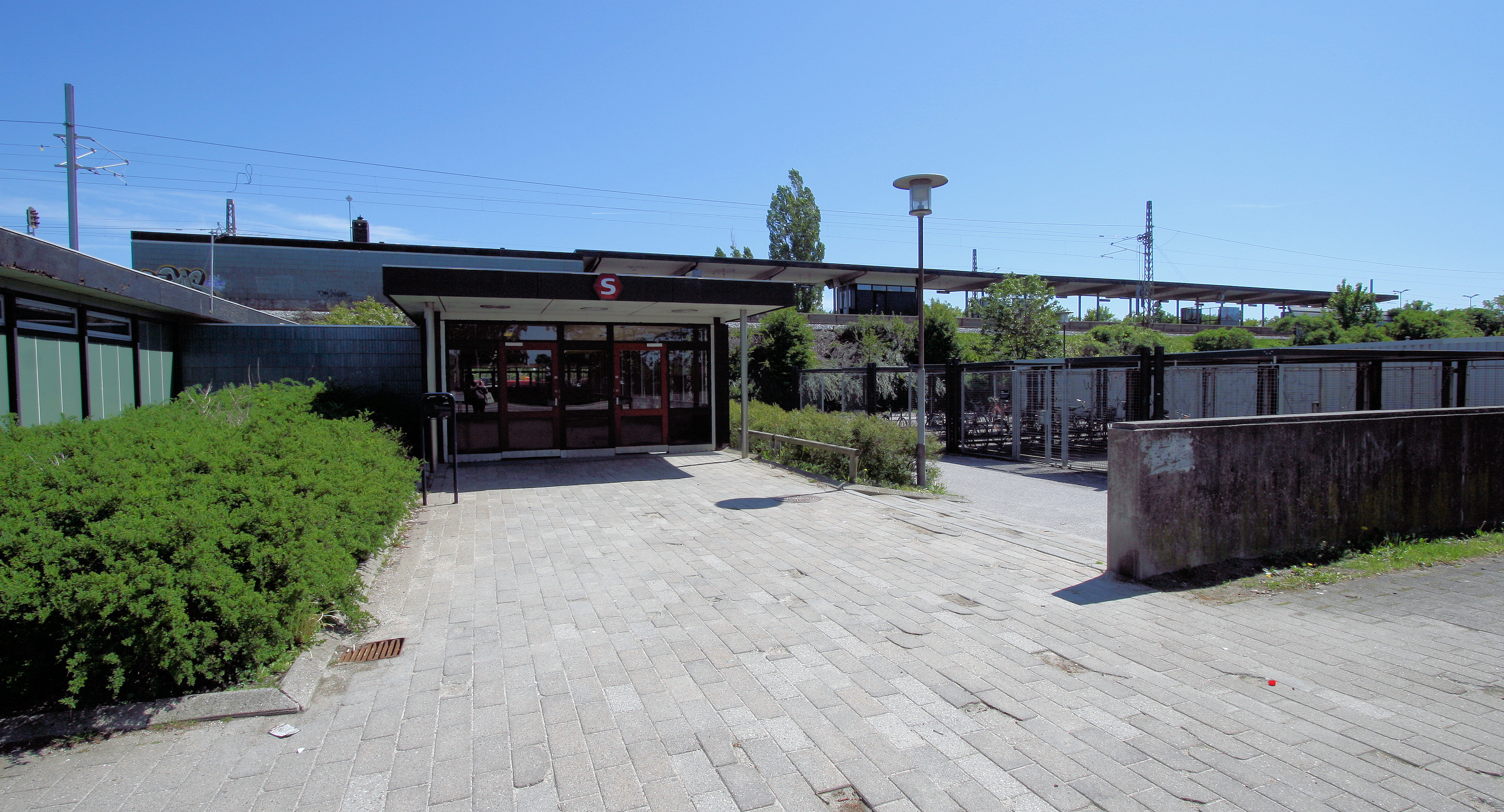
- Åmarken station in 2007

General information
- Location: Åmarkvej 2; 2650 Hvidovre; Hvidovre Municipality; Denmark
- Coordinates: 55.640°N 12.500°E
- Elevation: 4.2 metres (14 ft)
- Owner: DSB (station infrastructure); Banedanmark (rail infrastructure)
- Platforms: Island platform
- Tracks: 2
- Train operators: DSB

History
- Opened: 1972

Services
Preceding station	S-train	Following station
Copenhagen South towards Hillerød	A	Friheden towards Hundige
Copenhagen South towards Hillerød	A Sat–Sun	Friheden towards Køge
Location

Åmarken station is an S-train railway station serving the southeastern part of the suburb of Hvidovre west of Copenhagen, Denmark. It is located on the Køge radial of Copenhagen's S-train network.

== History ==
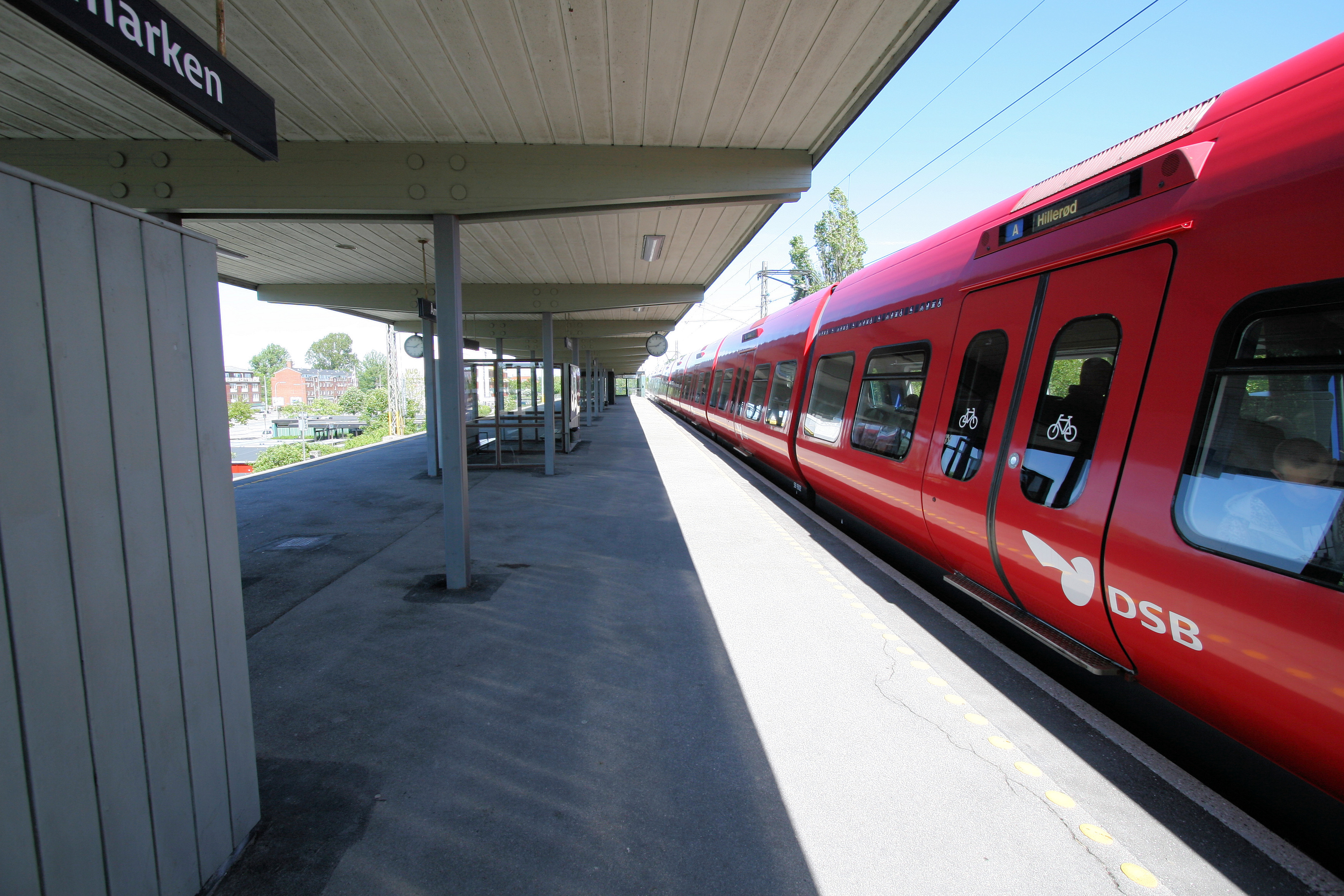
Station platform

The station opened on 1 October 1972 as the first section of the Køge Bay Line from Copenhagen to Vallensbæk was completed.

== See also ==
- List of Copenhagen S-train stations
- List of railway stations in Denmark
- Rail transport in Denmark
- Transport in Copenhagen
