= Sydhavn railway station =

Commuter railway station in Copenhagen, Denmark

Sydhavn
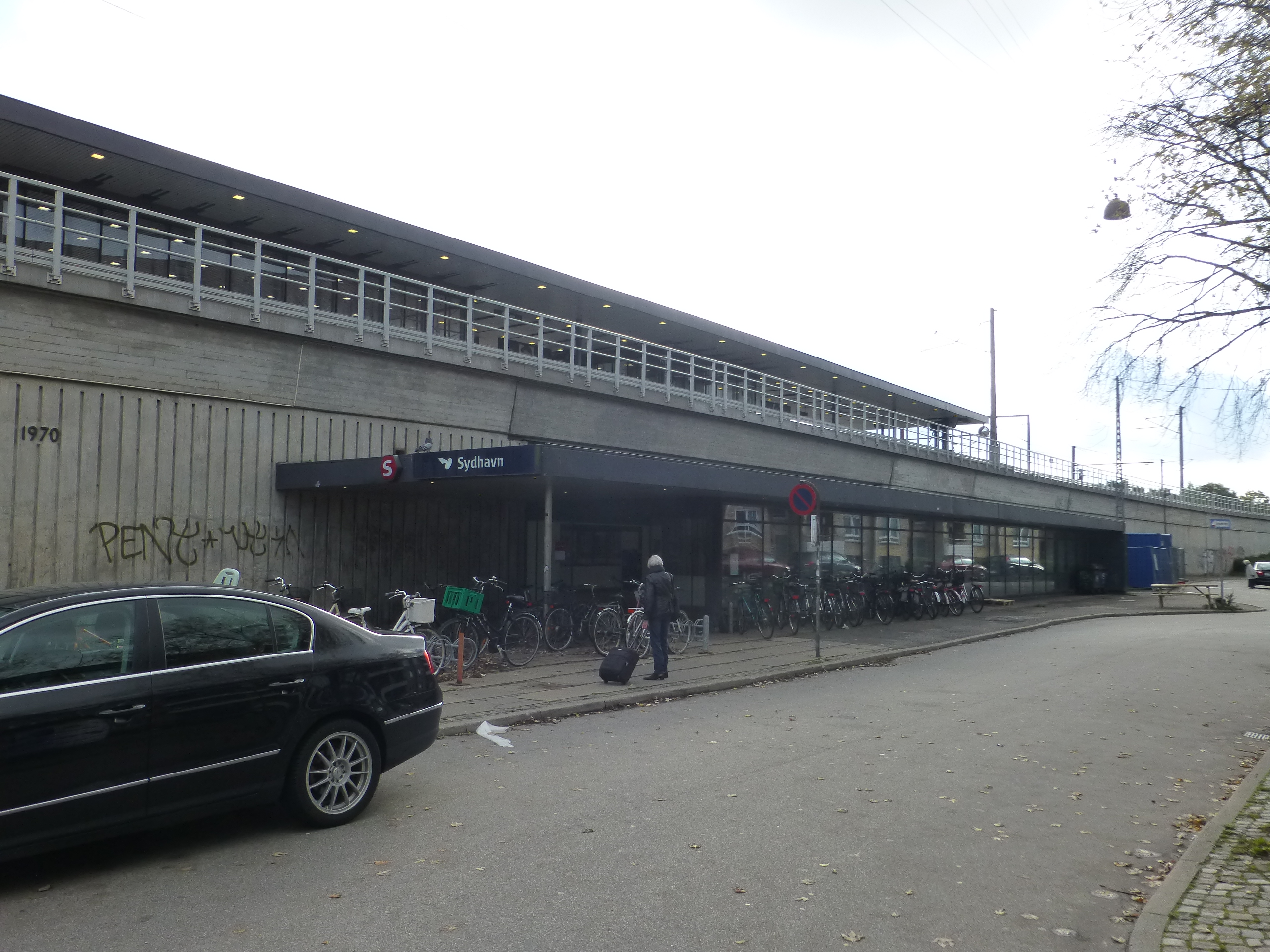
- Sydhavn station in 2014

General information
- Location: Ernst Kapersvej 1; 2450 Copenhagen SV; Copenhagen Municipality; Denmark
- Coordinates: 55°39′18″N 12°32′16″E
- Elevation: 3.2 metres (10 ft)
- Owner: DSB (station infrastructure); Banedanmark (rail infrastructure)
- Platforms: Island platform
- Tracks: 2
- Train operators: DSB

History
- Opened: 1972

Services
Preceding station	S-train	Following station
Dybbølsbro towards Hillerød	A	Sjælør towards Hundige
Dybbølsbro towards Hillerød	A Sat–Sun	Sjælør towards Køge
Dybbølsbro towards Holte	E Mon–Fri	Copenhagen South towards Køge
Location

Sydhavn station is an S-train station serving the district of Kongens Enghave, commonly known as Sydhavnen ("South Harbour"), in southern Copenhagen, Denmark. The station is located on the Køge radial of Copenhagen's S-train network.

== History ==
The station opened on 1 October 1972 as the first section of the Køge Bay Line from Copenhagen to Vallensbæk was completed.

== See also ==
- List of Copenhagen S-train stations
- List of railway stations in Denmark
