= Vigerslev =

Coordinates: 55°39′43″N 12°29′03″E

Vigerslev is a working-class neighborhood that forms part of Valby, Copenhagen, Denmark. The area is dominated by a large industrial zone, apartment buildings (5–6 floors) and a few single-family houses.

The area is connected with F-train (Vigerslev Allé station).
