= Copenhagen South railway station =

Main line and commuter railway station in Copenhagen, Denmark

København Syd
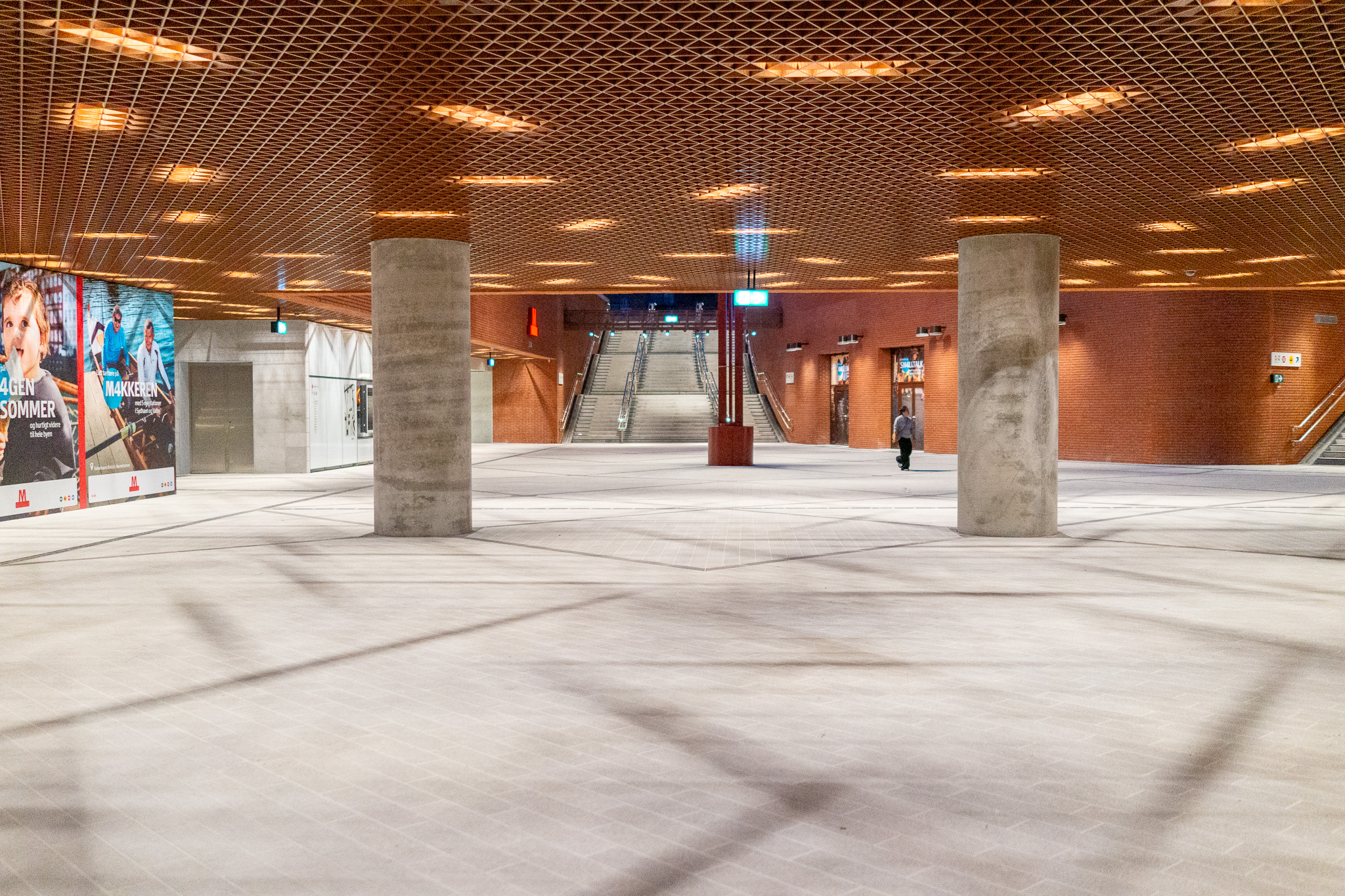
- Underground concourse at Copenhagen South connecting all lines

General information
- Location: Carl Jacobsens Vej 19; 2500 Valby; Copenhagen Municipality; Denmark
- Coordinates: 55°39′08.5″N 12°30′59″E
- Elevation: 4.9 metres (16 ft)
- System: DSB, S-train and Metro
- Owner: DSB (station infrastructure); Banedanmark (rail infrastructure)
- Lines: Snälltåget
- Platforms: 7 (3 island platforms, 4 side platforms)
- Tracks: 10
- Train operators: DSB

Construction
- Platform levels: 2
- Accessible: Yes

Other information
- Station code: Nel
- Fare zone: 2
- Website: Official website

History
- Opened: 16 November 2006 (Ringline); 6 January 2007 (Køge radial)
- Former names: Ny Ellebjerg (until 2023)

Services
Preceding station	DSB	Following station
Copenhagen Central towards Østerport	Copenhagen–Esbjerg InterCity	Køge North towards Esbjerg
Copenhagen Central towards Østerport	Copenhagen–Køge–Næstved Regional train	Køge North towards Næstved
Ørestad towards Copenhagen Airport	Copenhagen–Slagelse Regional train	Høje Taastrup towards Slagelse
Copenhagen Central Terminus	Copenhagen–Nykøbing F Regional train	Ringsted towards Nykøbing F
Preceding station	S-train	Following station
Sjælør towards Hillerød	A	Åmarken towards Hundige
Sjælør towards Hillerød	A Sat–Sun	Åmarken towards Køge
Sydhavn towards Holte	E Mon–Fri	Vallensbæk towards Køge
Terminus	F	Vigerslev Allé towards Hellerup
Preceding station	Copenhagen Metro	Following station
Terminus	M4	Mozarts Plads towards Orientkaj
Location

Copenhagen South station (Danish: København Syd Station, previously Ny Ellebjerg Station) is a main line and S-train railway station in the district of Valby in southwestern Copenhagen, Denmark. The station is located on numerous railway and branch lines passing through or diverging from the main lines at this station, and is gradually being developed into a major transport hub for public transport in Copenhagen.

== Location ==
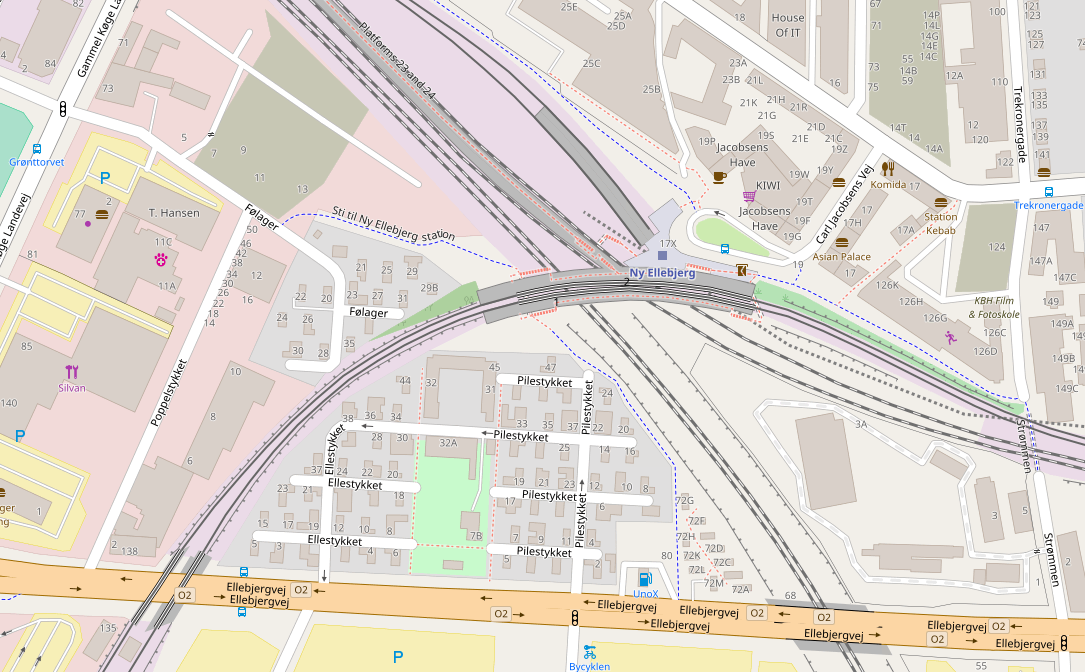
Map of the station and its immediate surroundings (2009).

The station is located on the S-train and main line network. It serves as an interchange station between the Køge radial (lines A and E), the Ring Line (line F), and trains on the Copenhagen–Ringsted Line (InterCity and regional train services). It also is the end station of Metro line M4.

It has three levels. The Metro station is underground. The Ring Line S-train platform, the Copenhagen–Ringsted Line regional platform, and the future Øresund Line platform are on ground level. On a bridge the platform for Køge radial S-trains is found.

== History ==
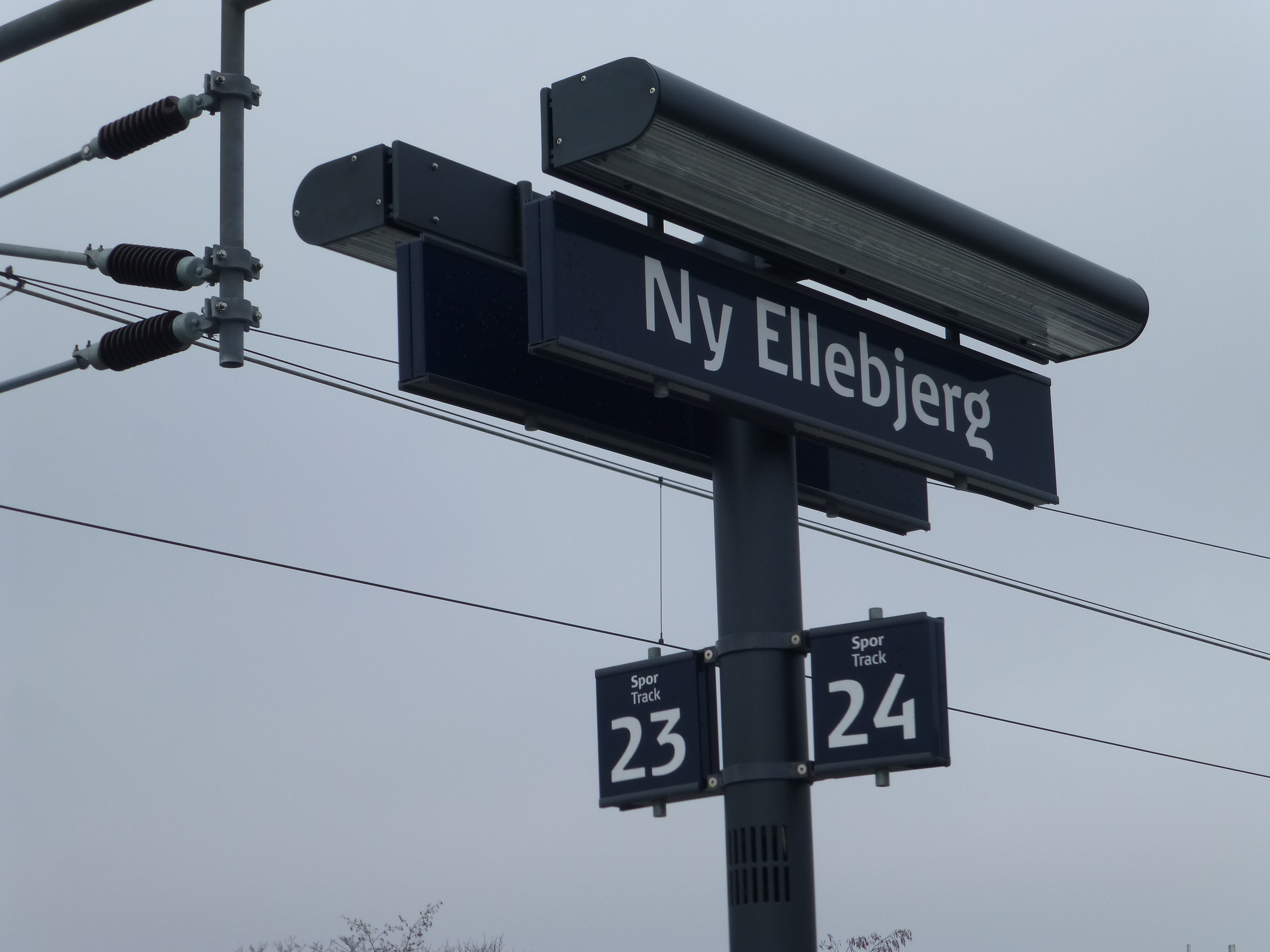
Train station sign with the station's previous name (2014).

Copenhagen South station was originally opened under the name Ny Ellebjerg (Ny meaning "New") as an interchange station between the Køge Bugt Line and the Ring Line of the Copenhagen S-train system. Before the station opened on 6 January 2007, there was an S-train station called Ellebjerg station a few hundred metres southwest of the current station, where the Køge Bugt Line passes over Ellebjergvej. That station is now closed.

New platforms were opened in 2013 for the high-speed Copenhagen–Ringsted Line, on which trains run via Køge North to Ringsted, in future at up to 250 km/h.

The station's name was changed from Ny Ellebjerg to København Syd (Copenhagen South) on 10 December 2023, in connection with the station's development into a major transport hub.

Copenhagen South station became the southern terminus of the M4 line of the Copenhagen Metro, when the extension opened on 22 June 2024.

== Art in the station ==
The metro station is decorated with walls in shades of blue from light sky blue at the top to deep midnight blue at the bottom by the platforms. In addition, there is a work of art in the form of a geocentric, astronomical clock, which will show a precise picture of some of the heavenly bodies's current location above Copenhagen South. A robotarm moves around magnetic discs representing the Sun, Moon, planets, stella nova (Tycho Brahe's supernova from 1572) and Sagittarius A*, the black hole at the center of the Milky Way. The artwork was created by the Danish artist Henrik Plenge Jakobsen.

== Future developments ==
Further main line platforms for trains using the Øresund Line between Sweden and Germany—bypassing Copenhagen Central Station—by continuing between Copenhagen Airport and the high-speed Copenhagen-Ringsted Line towards the future Fehmarn Belt Fixed Link, are going to be in operation by the end of 2025.

== Gallery ==
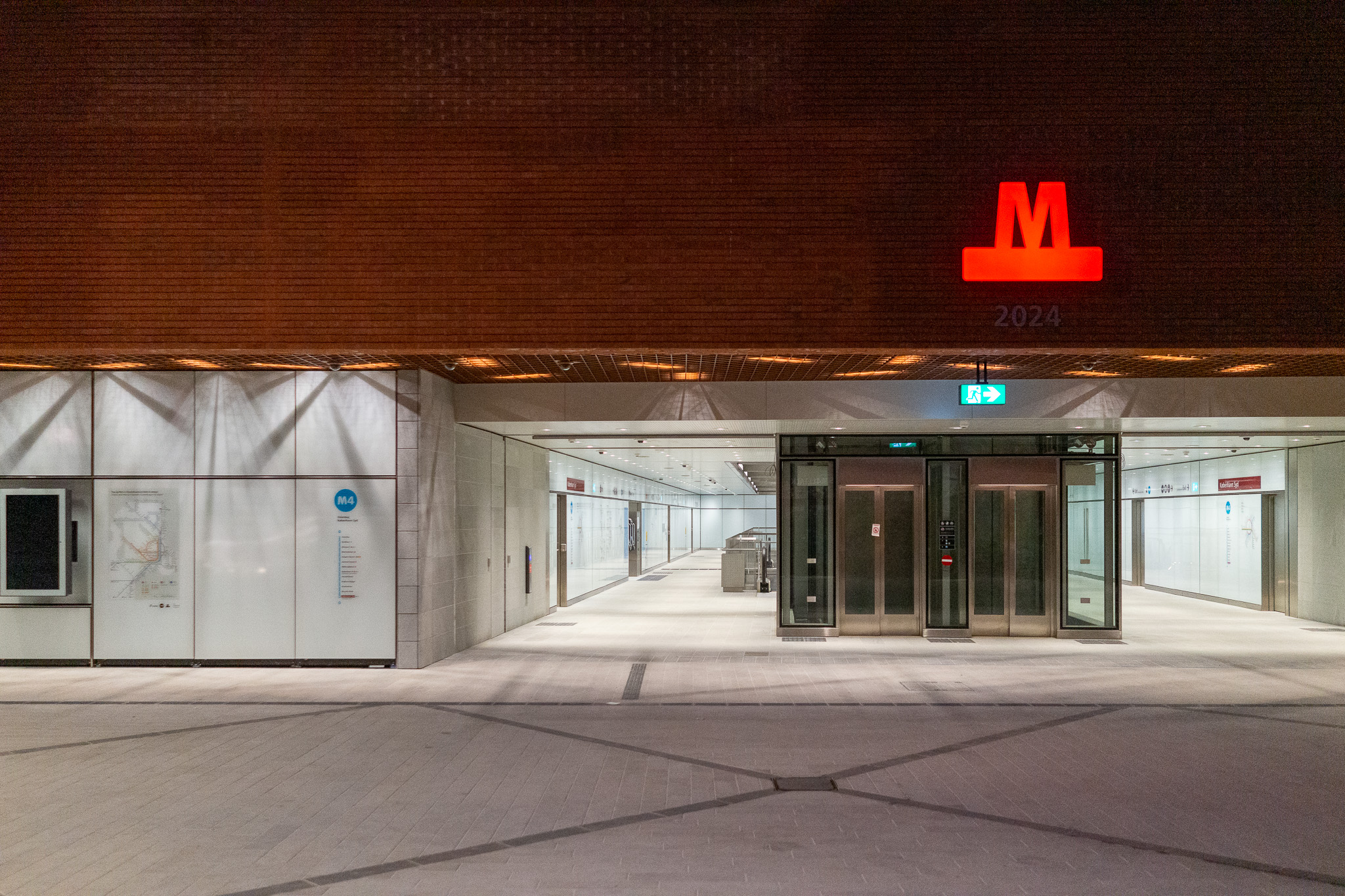
Entrance to M4 line

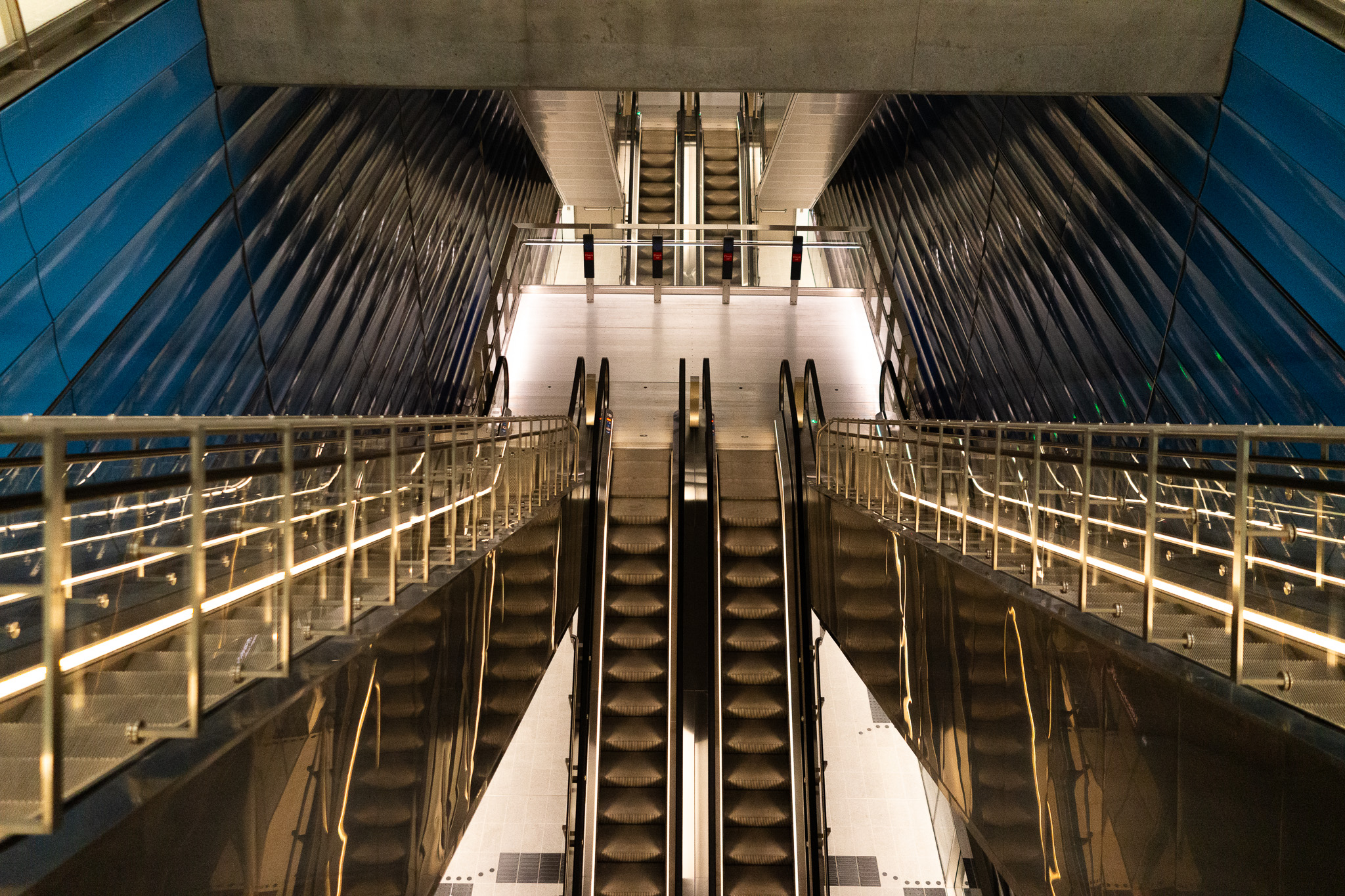
Escalators leading down to M4 platform

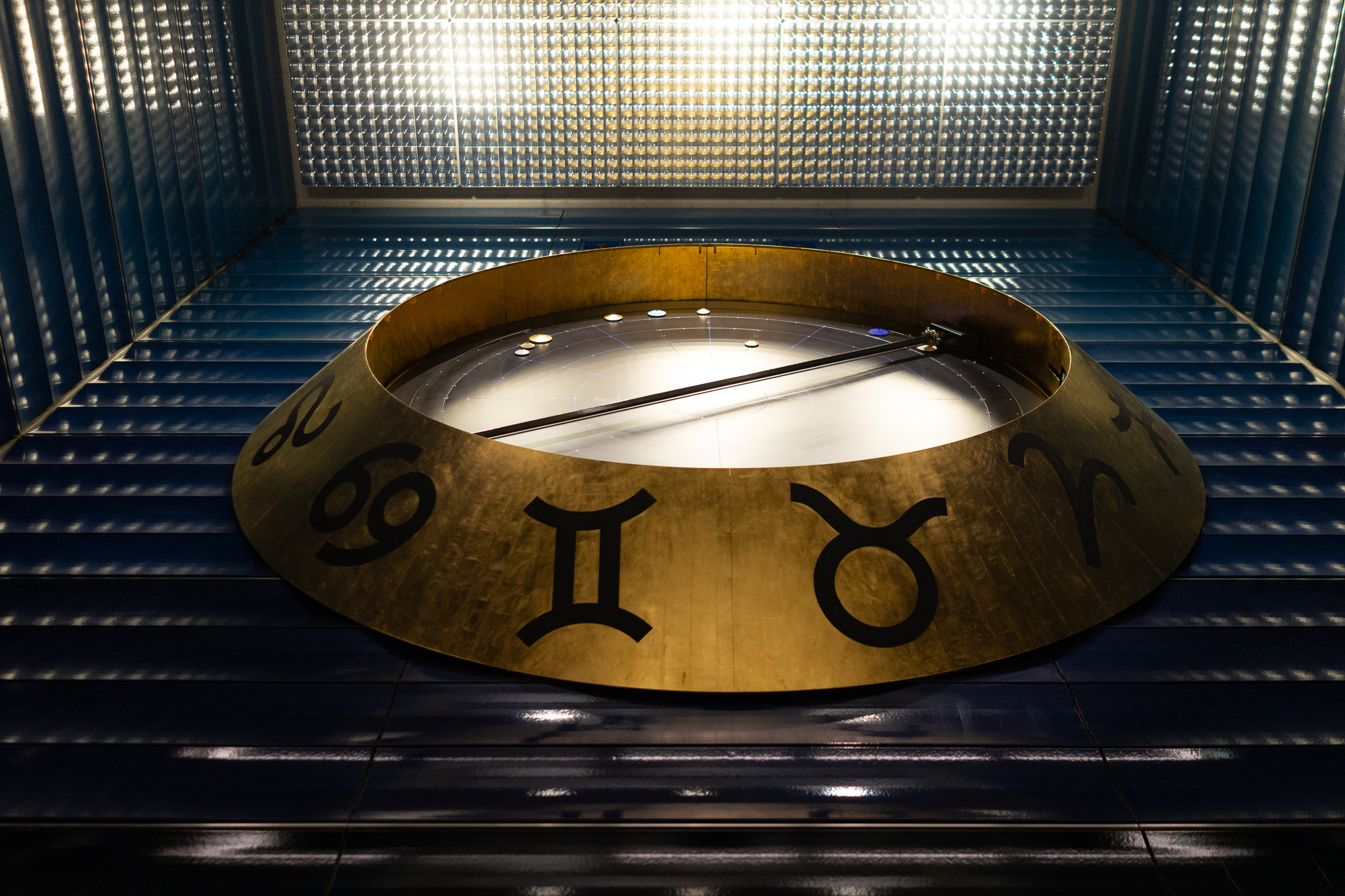
Artwork by Henrik Plenge Jakobsen

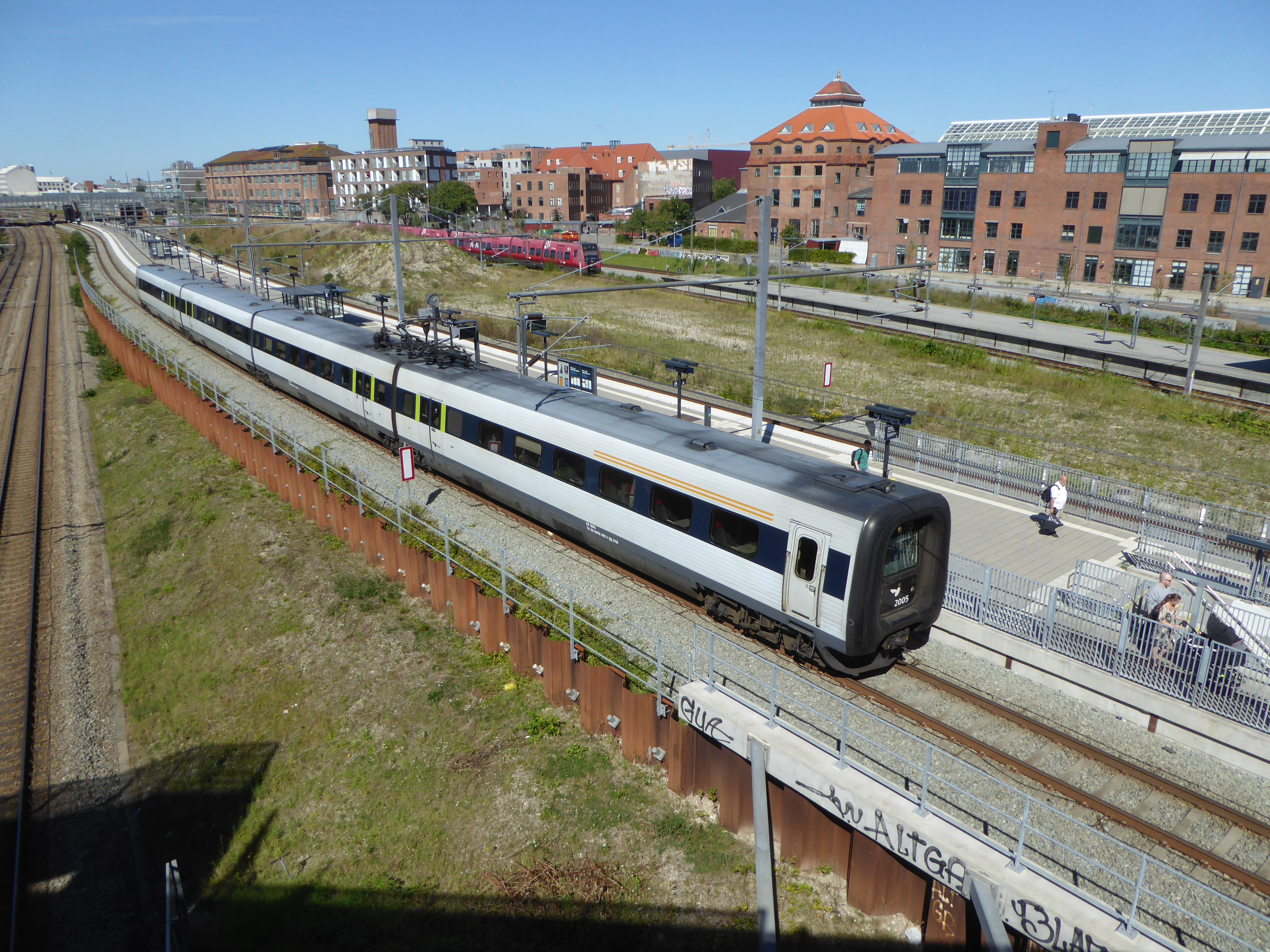
Intercity platforms in 2016

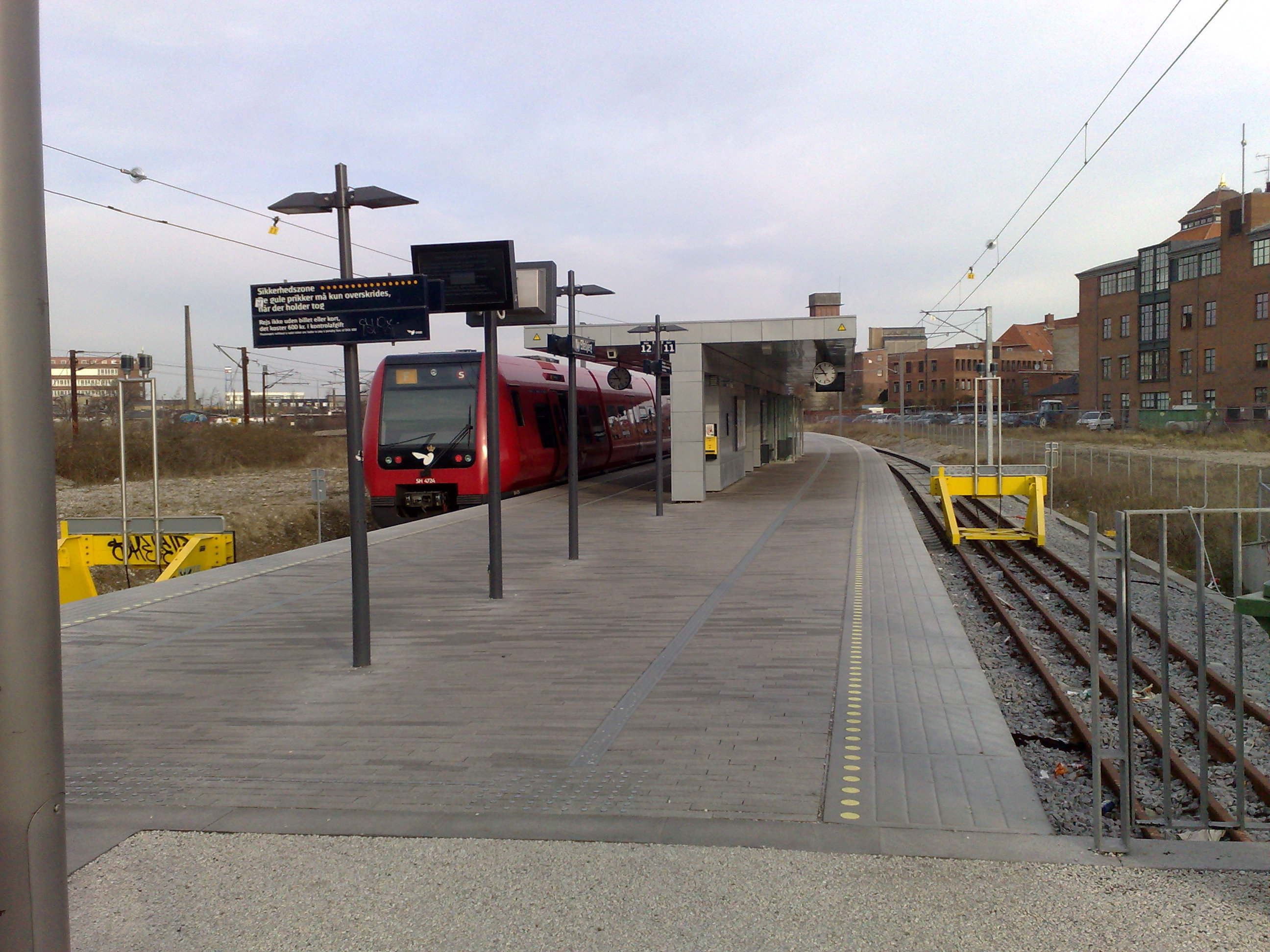
S-train platforms of the Ring Line (line F)

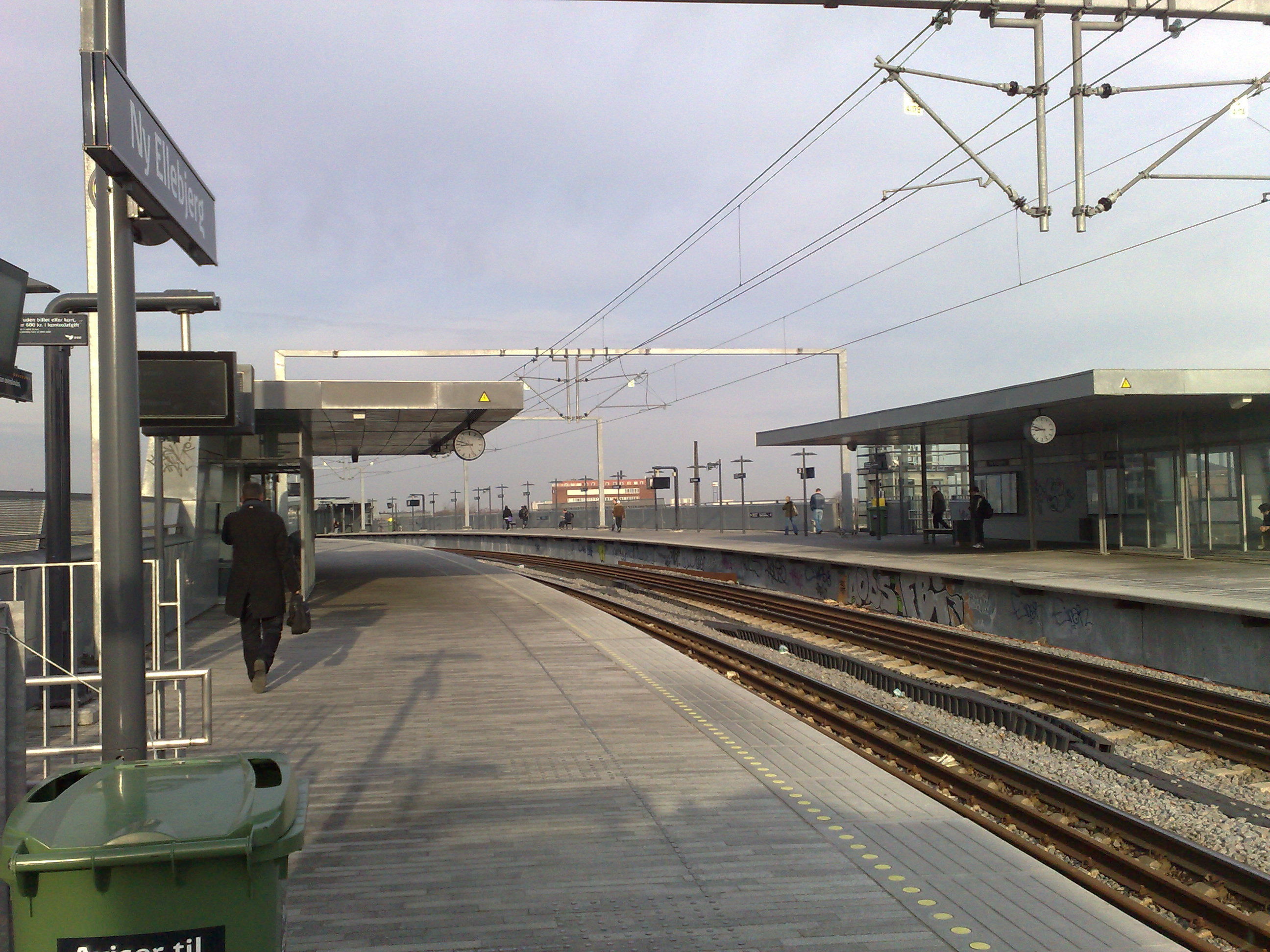
S-train platforms of the Køge Bay Line (lines A and E)

== See also ==
- List of Copenhagen Metro stations
- List of Copenhagen S-train stations
- List of railway stations in Denmark
- Rail transport in Denmark
- Transportation in Copenhagen
- Transportation in Denmark
- Danish State Railways
- Banedanmark
