= Vigerslev Allé railway station =

Commuter railway station in Copenhagen, Denmark

Vigerslev Allé
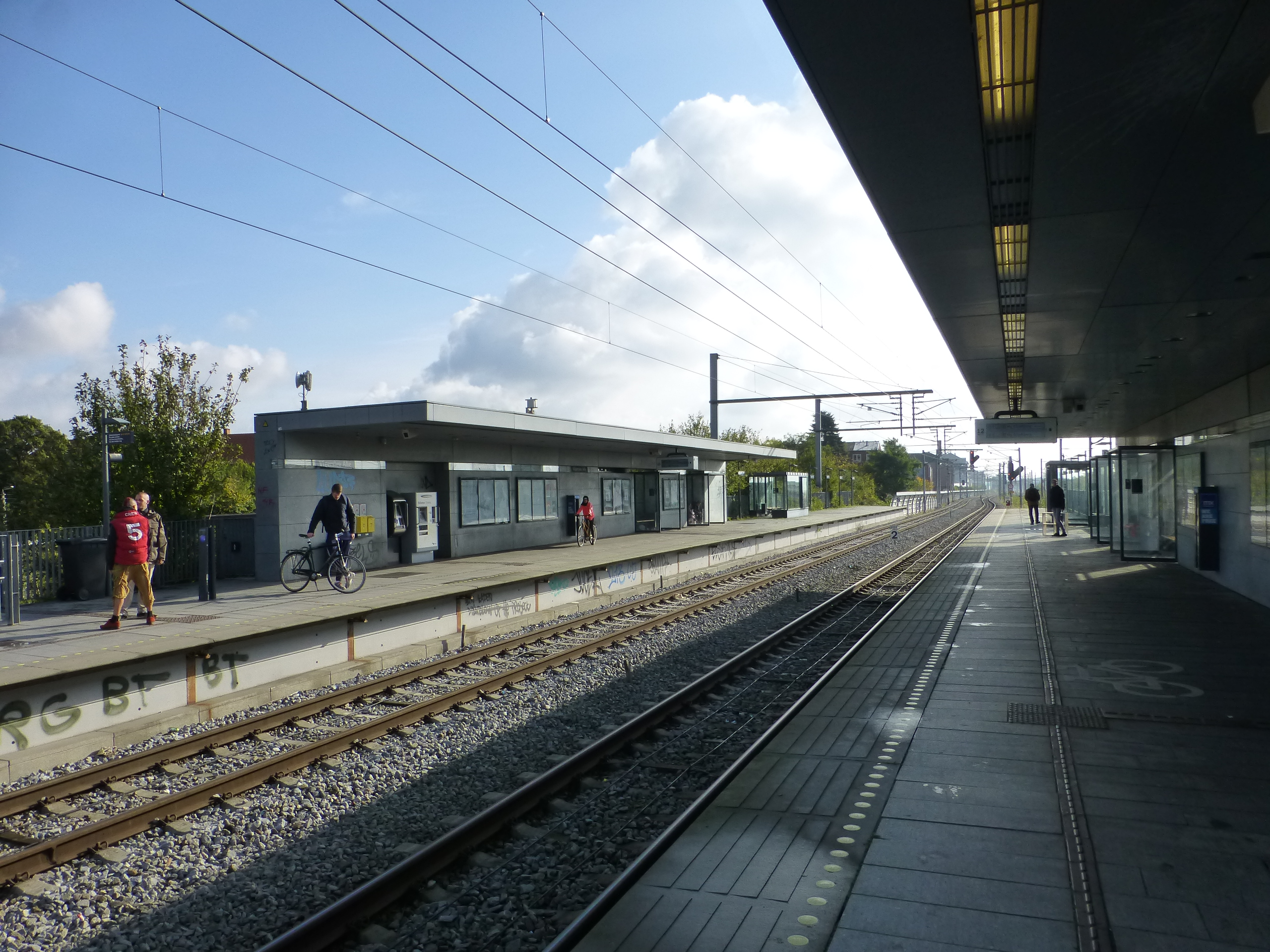
- Vigerslev Allé station in 2014

General information
- Location: Vigerslev Allé 141; 2500 Valby; Copenhagen Municipality; Denmark
- Coordinates: 55°39′35″N 12°29′57″E
- Elevation: 9.5 metres (31 ft)
- Owner: DSB (station infrastructure); Banedanmark (rail infrastructure)
- Platforms: 2 side platforms
- Tracks: 2 S-train + 3 bypass mainline
- Train operators: DSB

Other information
- Station code: Vgt

History
- Opened: 8 January 2005; 21 years ago

Services
| Preceding station | S-train | Following station |
|---|---|---|
| Copenhagen South Terminus | F | Danshøj towards Hellerup |
Location

Vigerslev Allé station is an S-train station in Copenhagen, Denmark. The station is located on Vigerslev Allé, the main traffic artery of its namesake neighbourghood of Vigerslev, which forms the westernmost part of the Copenhagen district of Valby.

It opened in 2005 and is located on the Ring Line of Copenhagen's S-train network.

== See also ==
- List of Copenhagen S-train stations
- List of railway stations in Denmark
- Rail transport in Denmark
- Transport in Copenhagen
- Transport in Denmark
