= Sjælør railway station =

Commuter railway station in Copenhagen, Denmark

Sjælør
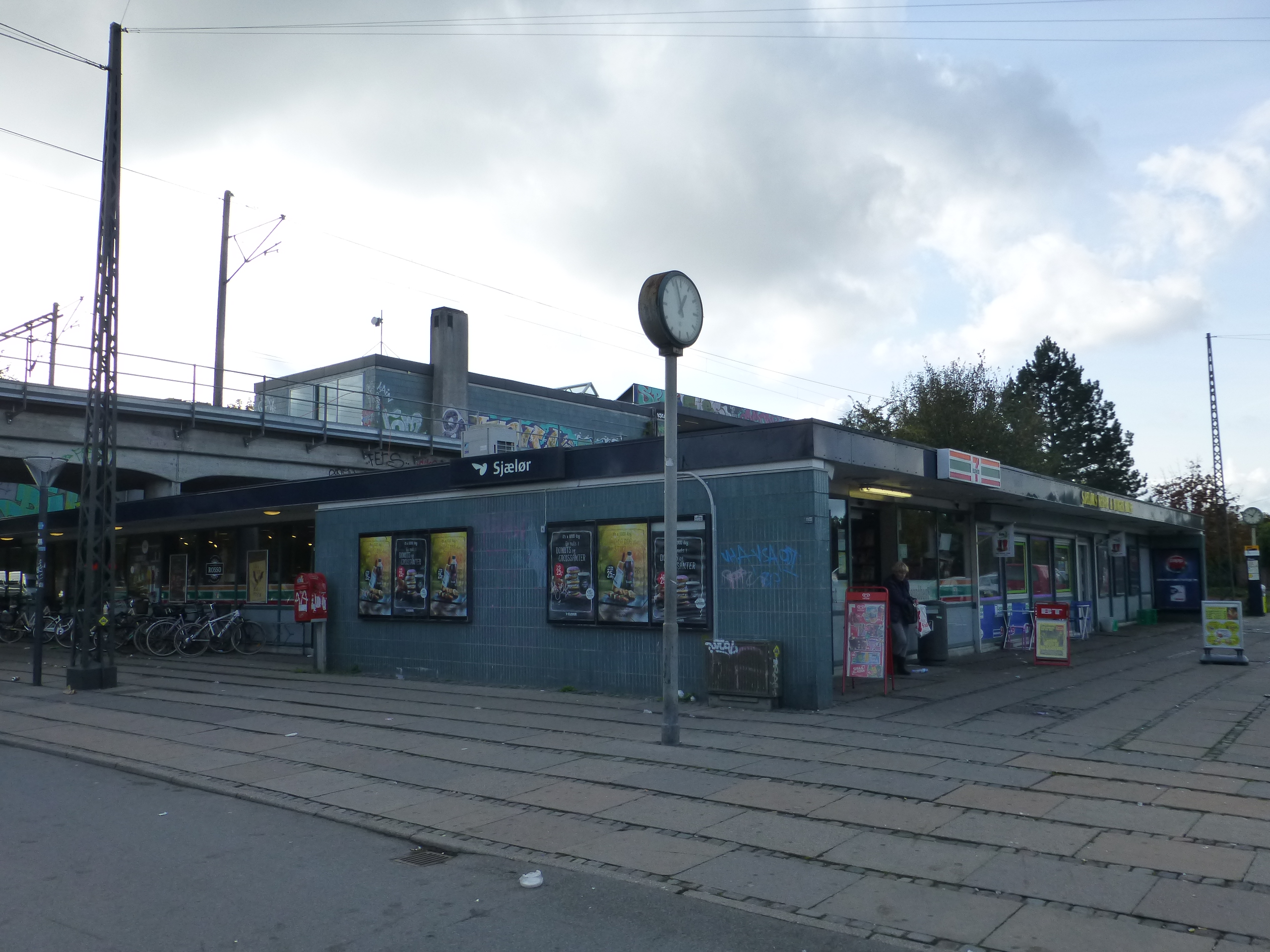
- Sjælør station in 2014

General information
- Location: Carl Jacobsensvej; 2500 Valby; Copenhagen Municipality; Denmark
- Coordinates: 55°39′06″N 12°31′37″E
- Elevation: 7.9 metres (26 ft)
- Owner: DSB (station infrastructure); Banedanmark (rail infrastructure)
- Platforms: Island platform
- Tracks: 2
- Train operators: DSB

Services
Preceding station	S-train	Following station
Sydhavn towards Hillerød	A	Copenhagen South towards Hundige
Sydhavn towards Hillerød	A Sat–Sun	Copenhagen South towards Køge
Location

Sjælør station is an S-train railway station serving the southern part of the district of Valby in Copenhagen, Denmark. The station is located on the Køge radial of Copenhagen's S-train network.

== History ==
The station opened on 1 October 1972 as the first section of the Køge Bay Line from Copenhagen to Vallensbæk was completed.

== See also ==
- List of Copenhagen S-train stations
- List of railway stations in Denmark
