= Jersie railway station =

Commuter railway station in Solrød Municipality, Denmark

Jersie
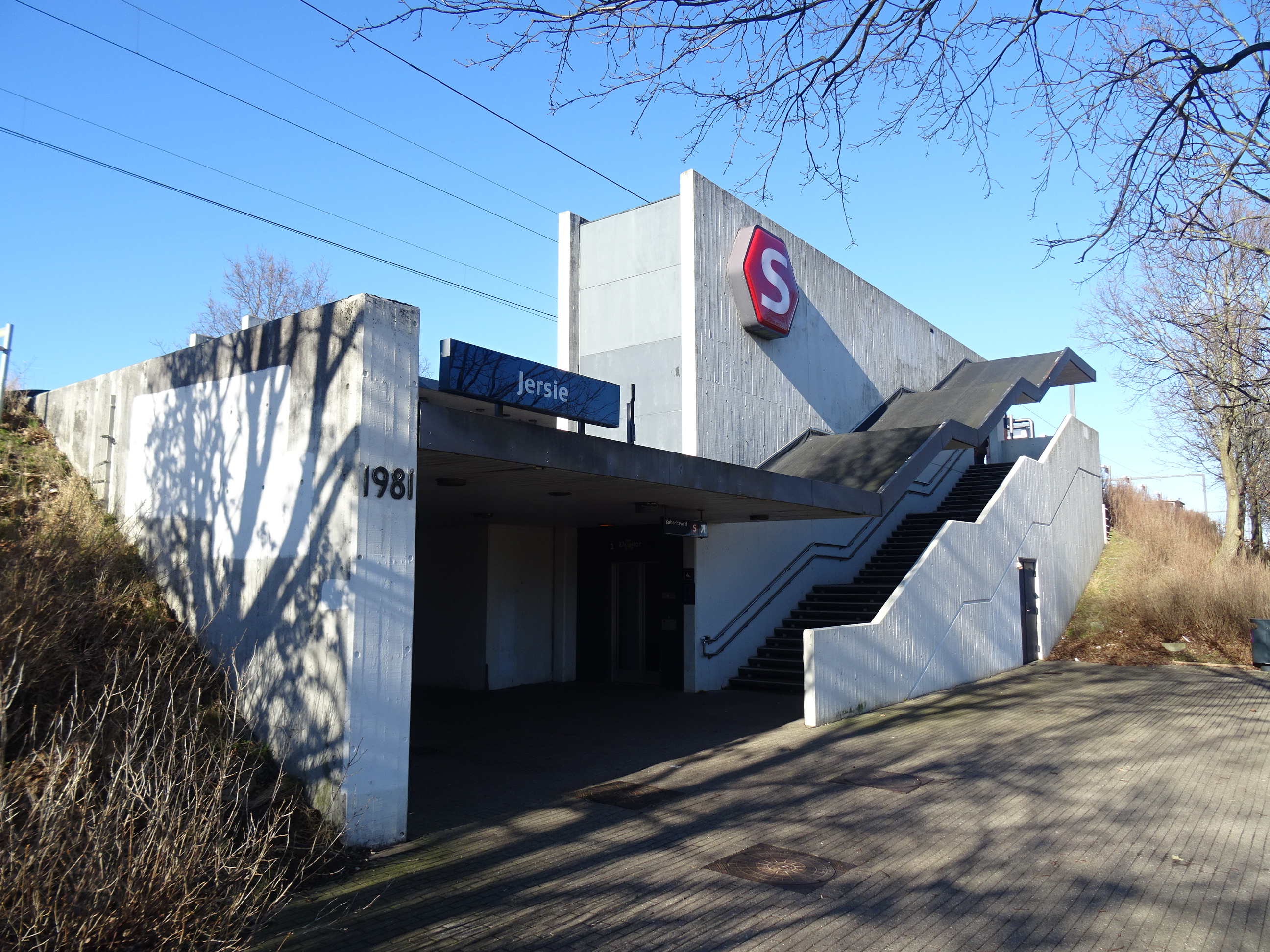
- Jersie Station.

General information
- Location: Spanager 1 Jersie, 2680 Solrød Strand; Solrød Municipality; Denmark
- Coordinates: 55°31′14″N 12°12′30″E
- Elevation: 6.6 metres (22 ft)
- Owner: DSB (station infrastructure); Banedanmark (rail infrastructure)
- Platforms: Side platforms
- Tracks: 2
- Train operators: DSB

Services
Preceding station	S-train	Following station
Solrød Strand towards Holte	E Mon–Fri	Køge North towards Køge
Solrød Strand towards Hillerød	A Sat–Sun	Køge North towards Køge
Location

Jersie station is a railway station serving Jersie Strand in the southern end of coastal Solrød municipality. It is located on the Køge radial of the S-train network in Copenhagen, Denmark.

== See also ==
- List of Copenhagen S-train stations
- List of railway stations in Denmark
