= LiveStub =

American secondary ticket marketplace

LiveStub, which angel investor Morten Lund backed, was a no-fee secondary ticket marketplace in North America. Founded by Michael Hershfield and Levi Bergovoy it attempted to bring transparency to the secondary event ticket market.

Because of LiveStub's high profile, LiveStub was viewed by users and media as an alternative voice to the traditional secondary ticket market players. Within months of launch, North American publications were sourcing CEO's Michael Hershfield for views on the Live Nation/ Ticketmaster merger and on high-profile sporting events.

Due to its primary investor's financial collapse, the macro-economic climate and the major shifts in the entertainment business Livestub was forced to go offline.
