= Solrød Strand railway station =

Commuter railway station in Solrød Municipality, Denmark

Solrød Strand
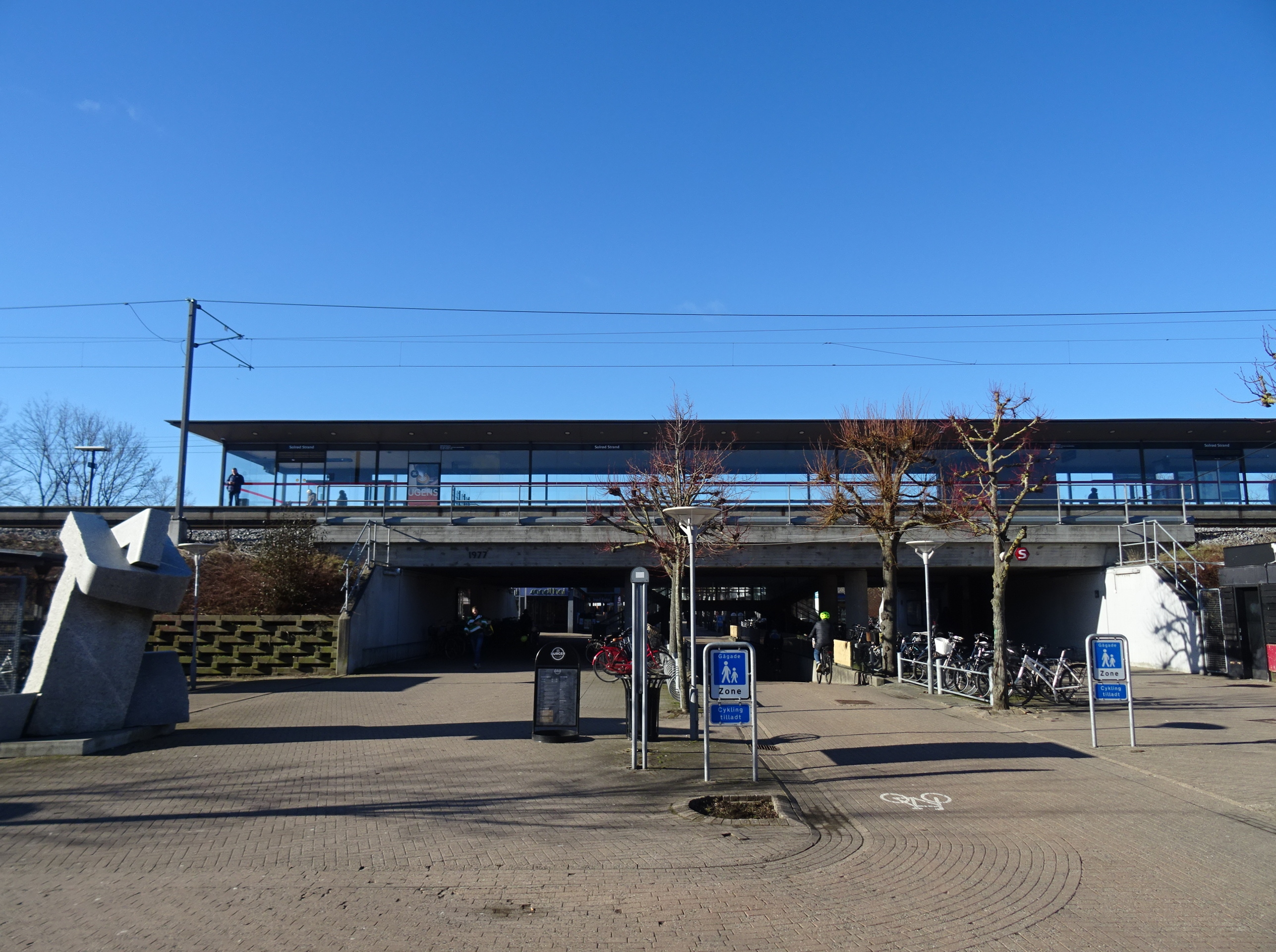
- Solrød Strand Station.

General information
- Location: 47 Solrød Center; 2680 Solrød Strand; Solrød Municipality; Denmark
- Coordinates: 55°32′00″N 12°13′05″E
- Elevation: 3.8 metres (12 ft)
- Owner: DSB (station infrastructure); Banedanmark (rail infrastructure)
- Platforms: Island platform
- Tracks: 2
- Train operators: DSB

Services
Preceding station	S-train	Following station
Karlslunde towards Holte	E Mon–Fri	Jersie towards Køge
Karlslunde towards Hillerød	A Sat–Sun	Jersie towards Køge
Location

Solrød Strand station is a railway station on the Køge radial of the S-train network in Copenhagen, Denmark. It serves Solrød Strand, in the northeastern part of the municipality of Solrød, and serves as the extended terminus of service A, with every second train terminating there on weekdays during daytime.

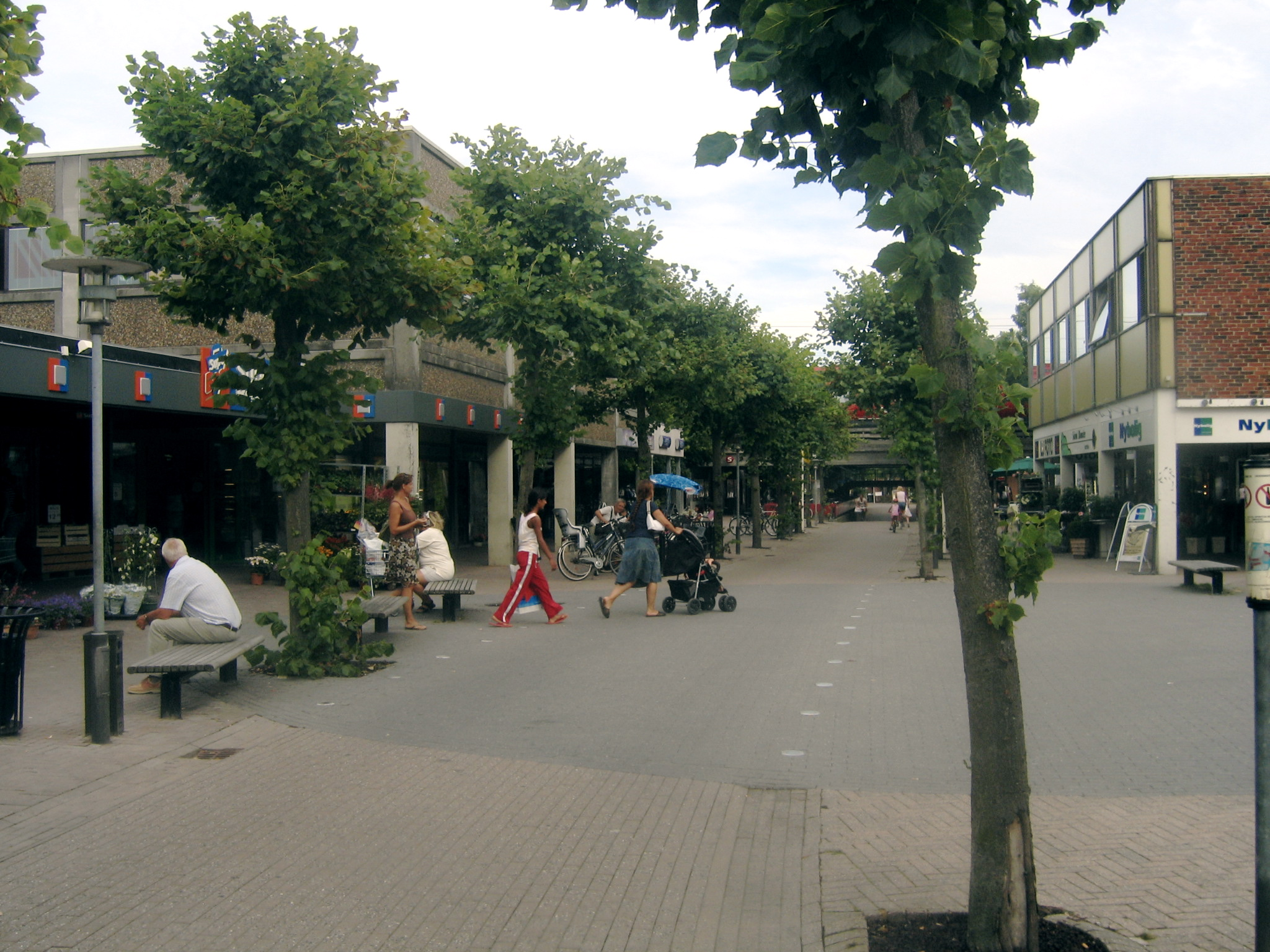
The station is in Solrød Center, a pedestrian shopping and residential area near the town hall

== See also ==
- List of Copenhagen S-train stations
- List of railway stations in Denmark
