= Ølby railway station =

Railway station in Køge Municipality, Denmark

Ølby
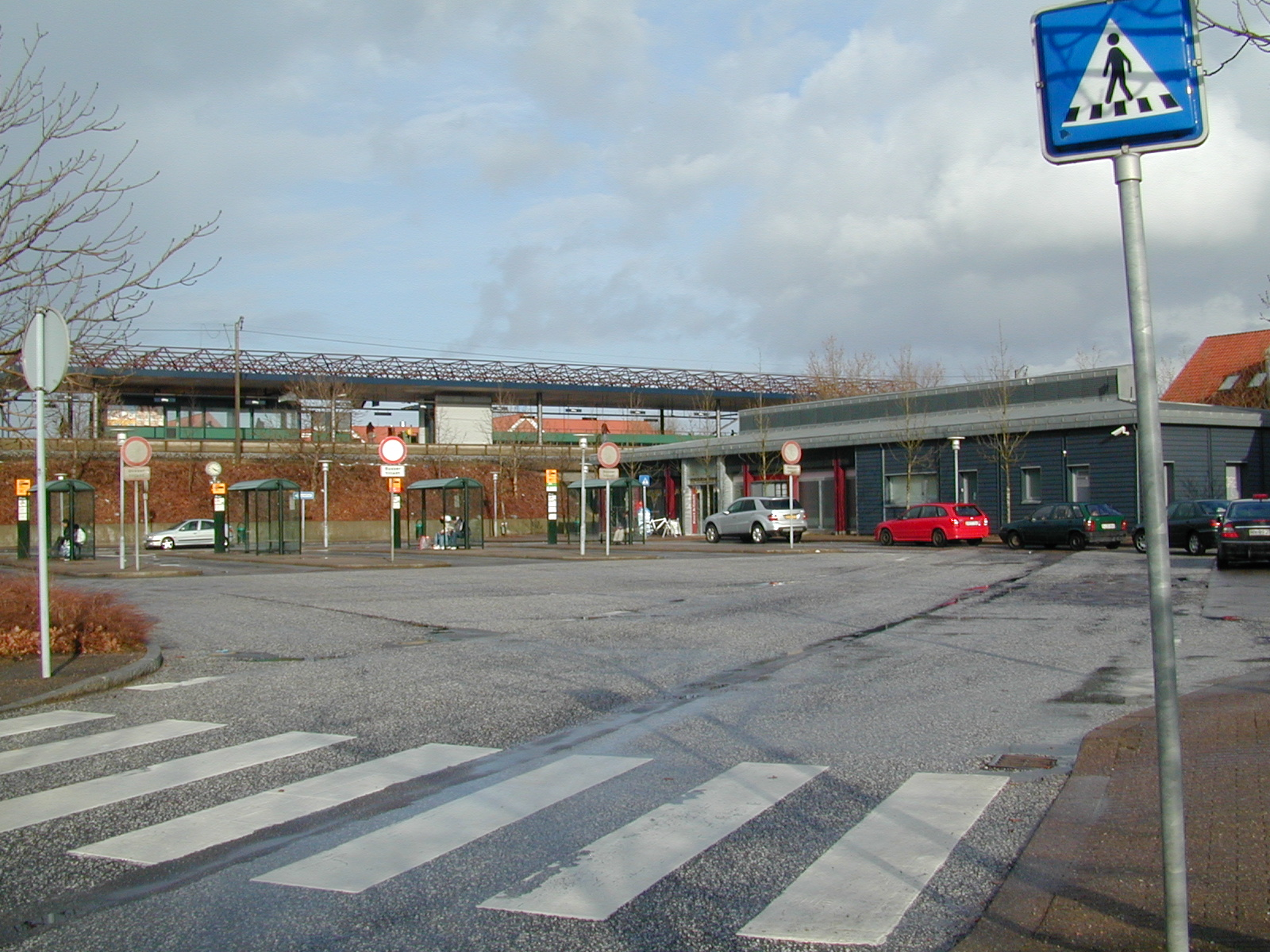

General information
- Location: Ølbycenter 2 Ølby, 4600 Køge; Køge Municipality; Denmark
- Coordinates: 55°28′48″N 12°10′32″E
- Elevation: 3.1 metres (10 ft)
- Owner: DSB (station infrastructure); Banedanmark (rail infrastructure)
- Platforms: 1 side platform local 1 island platform S-train
- Tracks: 3
- Train operators: DSB; Lokaltog

Services
Preceding station	DSB	Following station
Køge North towards Østerport	Copenhagen–Køge–Næstved Regional train	Køge towards Næstved
Preceding station	Lokaltog	Following station
Lille Skensved towards Roskilde	East Line Faxe branch Local train	Køge towards Faxe Ladeplads
Lille Skensved towards Roskilde	East Line Rødvig branch Local train	Køge towards Rødvig
Preceding station	S-train	Following station
Køge North towards Holte	E Mon–Fri	Køge Terminus
Køge North towards Hillerød	A Sat–Sun	Køge Terminus
Location

Ølby railway station is a railway station serving the suburb of Ølby Lyng in the municipality of Køge, Denmark. It is served by the Køge radial of Copenhagen's S-train network, and by Østbanen to Roskilde and Faxe. In April 2023, DSB started operating regional trains on the Næstved–Køge–Ølby–Copenhagen route via the high speed Copenhagen–Køge Nord Line.

== See also ==
- List of Copenhagen S-train stations
- List of railway stations in Denmark
