= 2021 Solrød municipal election =

← 2017	16 November 2021	2025 →

All 19 seats to the Solrød Municipal Council 10 seats needed for a majority
- Turnout: 13,177 (73.4%) ▼1.7pp
	First party	Second party	Third party
	V	A	H
Party	Venstre	Social Democrats	VoresSolrød
Last election	8 seats, 36.3%	4 seats, 18.6%	Did Not Stand
Seats won	4	4	3
Seat change	▼4	0	▲3
Popular vote	2,553	2,187	2,084
Percentage	19.6%	16.8%	16.0%
Swing	▼16.7%	▼1.8%	New
	Fourth party	Fifth party	Sixth party
	I	C	L
Party	Liberal Alliance	Conservatives	Havdruplisten
Last election	1 seat, 6.9%	1 seat, 6.5%	1 seat, 6.9%
Seats won	3	3	1
Seat change	▲2	▲2	0
Popular vote	1,944	1,473	831
Percentage	14.9%	11.3%	6.4%
Swing	▲8%	▲4.8%	▼0.5%
	Seventh party	Eighth party	Ninth party
	O	F	B
Party	Danish People's Party	Green Left	Social Liberals
Last election	1 seat, 8.8%	1 seat, 5.0%	1 seat, 3.7%
Seats won	1	0	0
Seat change	0	▼1	▼1
Popular vote	604	489	129
Percentage	4.6%	3.8%	1.0%
Swing	▼4.2%	▼1.2%	▼2.7%
Mayor before election
Niels Hörup
Venstre
Mayor after election
Emil Blücher
Liberal Alliance

Ever since the 2007 municipal reform, and prior to this election, the election results had led to Niels Hörup from Venstre becoming mayor. All the elections had given Venstre 8 seats. In the 2017 election, the blue bloc had won 11 seats.

However this election was quite remarkable in multiple ways. First off this would become Liberal Alliance best result in any municipality in the 2017 Danish local elections, as they won 14.9% of the vote, an 8% increase compared to 2017. This would also be the only municipal election in 2017 where no party won above 20% of the vote. The result would be very split, with 5 parties winning 3 or 4 seats. Venstre would still become the party to receive the most votes, but would lose 4 seats.

On election night, at first, it looked like the Conservatives had won the mayor's position. However to great frustration from the Conservatives, the Liberal Alliance had decided to support the Social Democrats. The day following the election, Jonas Ring Madsen from the Social Democrats could declare that he had secured the mayor's position.

On 22 November 2021, however, Emil Blücher from Liberal Alliance could announce that he would become the new mayor, as the Conservatives, Venstre and local party Havdrup Listen supported him as the new mayor.

This would mark the first mayor position of Liberal Alliance.

== Electoral system ==
For elections to Danish municipalities, a number varying from 9 to 31 are chosen to be elected to the municipal council. The seats are then allocated using the D'Hondt method and a closed list proportional representation. Solrød Municipality had 19 seats in 2021

Unlike in Danish General Elections, in elections to municipal councils, electoral alliances are allowed.

== Electoral alliances ==
=== Electoral Alliance 1 ===
Party		Political alignment
A	Social Democrats	Centre-left
F	Green Left	Centre-left to Left-wing
Ø	Red–Green Alliance	Left-wing to Far-Left

=== Electoral Alliance 2 ===
Party		Political alignment
B	Social Liberals	Centre to Centre-left
C	Conservatives	Centre-right
L	Havdruplisten	Local politics

=== Electoral Alliance 3 ===
Party		Political alignment
D	New Right	Right-wing to Far-right
I	Liberal Alliance	Centre-right to Right-wing
O	Danish People's Party	Right-wing to Far-right

== Results by polling station ==
Division	A	B	C	D	F	H	I	L	O	V	Ø
Division	%	%	%	%	%	%	%	%	%	%	%
Havdrup	16.6	0.6	7.4	3.6	4.6	5.1	8.8	30.6	6.2	14.5	2.1
Det Nordlige Strandområde	16.6	1.2	13.4	3.4	3.8	16.2	16.1	0.4	4.1	22.8	2.1
Det Sydlige Strandområde	17.0	1.0	11.3	3.4	3.3	20.6	16.7	0.4	4.4	19.2	2.7

== Results ==
Party		Votes	%	+/-	Seats	+/-
Solrød Municipality
V	Venstre	2,553	19.56	-16.72	4	-4
A	Social Democrats	2,187	16.76	-1.86	4	0
H	VoresSolrød	2,084	15.97	New	3	New
I	Liberal Alliance	1,944	14.90	+7.98	3	+2
C	Conservatives	1,473	11.29	+4.79	3	+2
L	Havdruplisten	831	6.37	-0.53	1	0
O	Danish People's Party	604	4.63	-4.19	1	0
F	Green Left	489	3.75	-1.21	0	-1
D	New Right	449	3.44	+1.50	0	0
Ø	Red-Green Alliance	306	2.35	New	0	New
B	Social Liberals	129	0.99	-2.74	0	-1
Total		13,049	100	N/A	19	N/A
Invalid votes		30	0.17	-0.12		
Blank votes		98	0.55	-0.16		
Turnout		13,177	73.35	-1.75		
Source: valg.dk
