= 2025 Solrød municipal election =

Municipal election in Denmark

← 2021	18 November 2025	2029 →

All 19 seats to the Solrød municipal council 10 seats needed for a majority
- Turnout: 14,121 (74.3%) ▲1.0%
	First party	Second party	Third party
	I	V	A
Party	Liberal Alliance	Venstre	Social Democrats
Last election	3 seats, 14.9%	4 seats, 19.6%	4 seats, 16.8%
Seats won	7	4	2
Seat change	▲4	0	▼2
Popular vote	4,383	2,705	1,658
Percentage	31.4%	19.4%	11.9%
Swing	▲16.5%	▼0.2%	▼4.9%
	Fourth party	Fifth party	Sixth party
	L	C	T
Party	HavdrupListen	Conservatives	VoresSolrød
Last election	1 seat, 6.4%	3 seats, 11.3%	3 seats, 16.0%
Seats won	2	1	1
Seat change	▲1	▼2	▼2
Popular vote	1,038	1,033	943
Percentage	7.4%	7.4%	6.8%
Swing	▲1.1%	▼3.9%	▼9.2%
	Seventh party	Eighth party	Ninth party
	F	Æ	O
Party	Green Left	Denmark Democrats	Danish People's Party
Last election	0 seats, 3.7%	Did not stand	1 seat, 4.6%
Seats won	1	1	0
Seat change	▲1	▲1	▼1
Popular vote	587	572	423
Percentage	4.2%	4.1%	3.0%
Swing	▲0.5%	New	▼1.6%
Mayor before election
Emil Blücher
Liberal Alliance
Mayor after election
Emil Blücher
Liberal Alliance

The 2025 Solrød Municipal election will be held on 18 November 2025, to elect the 19 members to sit in the regional council for the Solrød Municipal council, in the period of 2026 to 2029. Emil Blücher from the Liberal Alliance, would secure re-election.

== Background ==
Following the 2021 election, Emil Blücher from Liberal Alliance became mayor for his first term, and the first mayor from the party. The results from the 2021 election, were remarkable, as no party won 20% or more of the total votes. The 2021 election also saw, the mayor position going from likely going to the Conservatives, then looking set for the Social Democrats, and ending with the Liberal Alliance. In the 2021 Danish local elections, the Liberal Alliance won just 1.4% of the vote nationwide, and only won 9 seats, 3 of them being in the 2021 Solrød municipal election.

Since 2021 the party has enjoyed improvement in both the 2022 Danish general election and the 2024 European Parliament election. Current opinion polls, also expect an improvement in the Next Danish general election, with an Epinion poll published 1 May 2025, suggesting they could get around 13.1% in a general election, significantly higher than 1.4%, making a hold of the mayoral position a real possibility. Blücher would run for re-election.

== Electoral system ==
For elections to Danish municipalities, a number varying from 9 to 31 are chosen to be elected to the municipal council. The seats are then allocated using the D'Hondt method and a closed list proportional representation. Solrød Municipality had 19 seats in 2025.

== Electoral alliances ==
=== Electoral Alliance 1 ===
Party		Political alignment
B	Social Liberals	Centre to Centre-left
F	Green Left	Centre-left to Left-wing
Ø	Red-Green Alliance	Left-wing to Far-Left

=== Electoral Alliance 2 ===
Party		Political alignment
C	Conservatives	Centre-right
L	HavdrupListen	Local politics
T	VoresSolrød	Local politics

=== Electoral Alliance 3 ===
Party		Political alignment
O	Danish People's Party	Right-wing to Far-right
V	Venstre	Centre-right
Æ	Denmark Democrats	Right-wing to Far-right

== Results by polling station ==
Division	A	B	C	F	I	L	O	T	V	Æ	Ø
Division	%	%	%	%	%	%	%	%	%	%	%
Havdrup	8.8	1.5	3.4	3.8	19.9	32.3	3.6	1.7	18.9	4.1	1.8
Det Nordlige Strandområde	12.8	3.2	8.8	4.2	34.0	0.9	2.9	7.5	19.8	4.0	1.8
Det Sydlige Strandområde	12.6	2.3	8.1	4.4	34.7	1.0	2.9	8.5	19.3	4.2	2.2

== Results ==
Party		Votes	%	+/-	Seats	+/-
Solrød Municipality
I	Liberal Alliance	4,383	31.39	+16.49	7	+4
V	Venstre	2,705	19.37	-0.19	4	0
A	Social Democrats	1,658	11.88	-4.88	2	-2
L	HavdrupListen	1,038	7.43	+1.07	2	+1
C	Conservatives	1,033	7.40	-3.89	1	-2
T	VoresSolrød	943	6.75	-9.22	1	-2
F	Green Left	587	4.20	+0.46	1	+1
Æ	Denmark Democrats	572	4.10	New	1	New
O	Danish People's Party	423	3.03	-1.60	0	-1
B	Social Liberals	342	2.45	+1.46	0	0
Ø	Red-Green Alliance	278	1.99	-0.35	0	0
Total		13,962	100	N/A	19	N/A
Invalid votes		31	0.16	0.0		
Blank votes		128	0.67	+0.20		
Turnout		14,121	74.33	+0.98		
Source: valg.dk

== Opinion polls ==
Polling firm	Fieldwork date	Sample size	V	A	T	I	C	L	O	F	Ø	B	Æ	Others	Lead
Epinion	4 Sep - 13 Oct 2025	478	20.5	17.6	–	27.3	4.8	–	6.8	9.3	3.7	1.7	3.7	4.7	6.8
2024 european parliament election	9 Jun 2024		18.3	15.1	–	11.4	10.2	–	7.6	13.1	3.0	6.0	5.3	–	3.2
2022 general election	1 Nov 2022		17.2	23.2	–	11.6	5.7	–	3.9	8.4	1.9	2.6	6.1	–	6.0
2021 regional election	16 Nov 2021		22.0	27.4	–	7.3	17.4	–	6.0	5.2	3.8	2.9	–	–	5.4
2021 municipal election	16 Nov 2021		19.6 (4)	16.8 (4)	16.0 (3)	14.9 (3)	11.3 (3)	6.4 (1)	4.6 (1)	3.7 (0)	2.3 (0)	1.0 (0)	–	–	2.8
