= Karlslunde railway station =

Commuter railway station in Greater Copenhagen, Denmark

Karlslunde
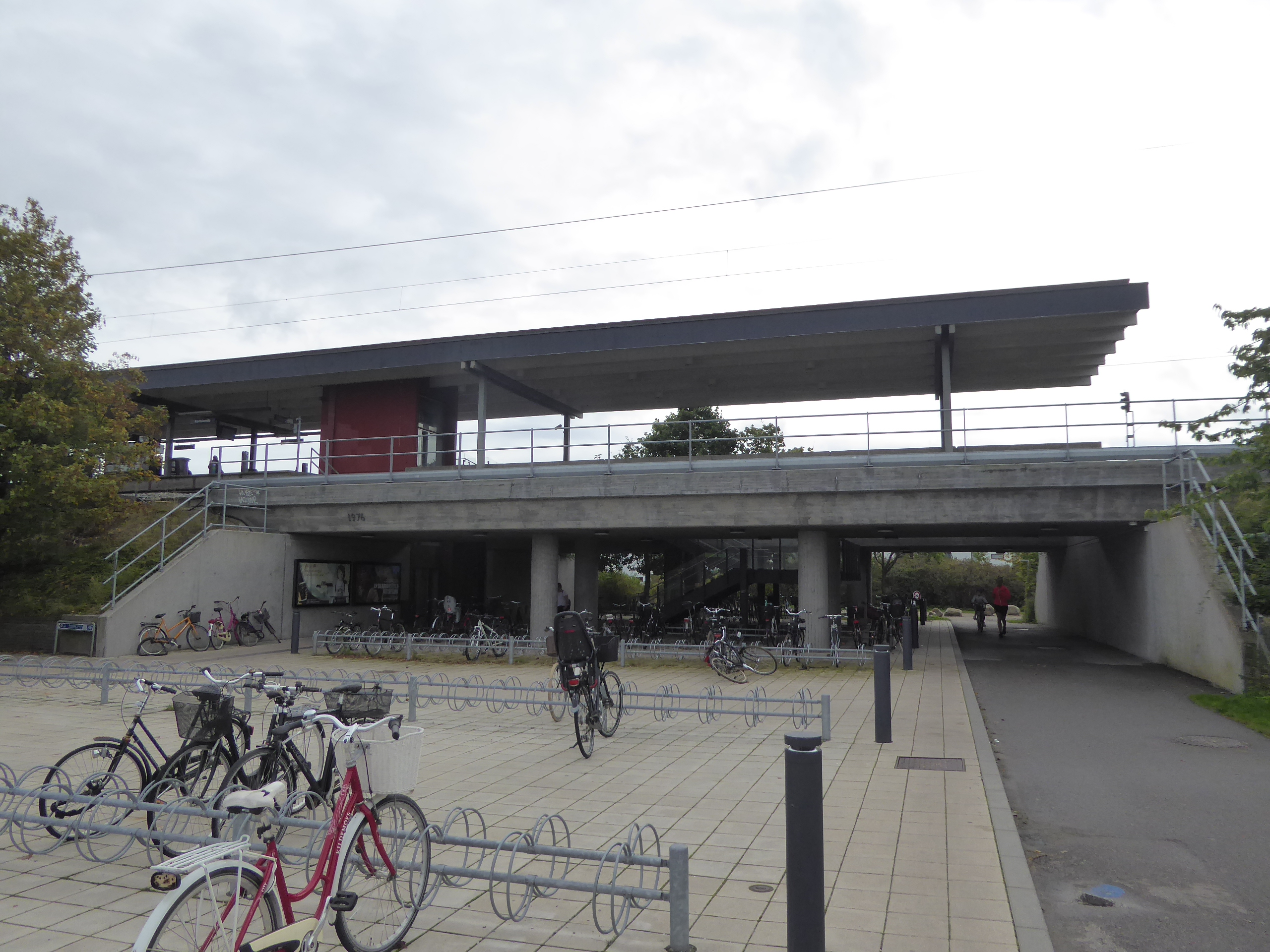
- Karlslunde station in 2019

General information
- Location: Stationsager 10; 2690 Karlslunde; Greve Municipality; Denmark
- Coordinates: 55°33′58″N 12°16′08″E
- Elevation: 7.1 metres (23 ft)
- Owner: DSB (station infrastructure); Banedanmark (rail infrastructure)
- Platforms: Island platform
- Tracks: 2
- Train operators: DSB

Services
Preceding station	S-train	Following station
Greve towards Holte	E Mon–Fri	Solrød Strand towards Køge
Greve towards Hillerød	A Sat–Sun	Solrød Strand towards Køge
Location

Karlslunde station is a suburban rail railway station serving the suburb of Karlslunde southwest of Copenhagen, Denmark. The station is located on the Køge radial of Copenhagen's S-train network.

== See also ==
- List of Copenhagen S-train stations
- List of railway stations in Denmark
