= Ølby =

Neighbourhood in Køge, Denmark

Coordinates: 55.48411°N 12.16719°E

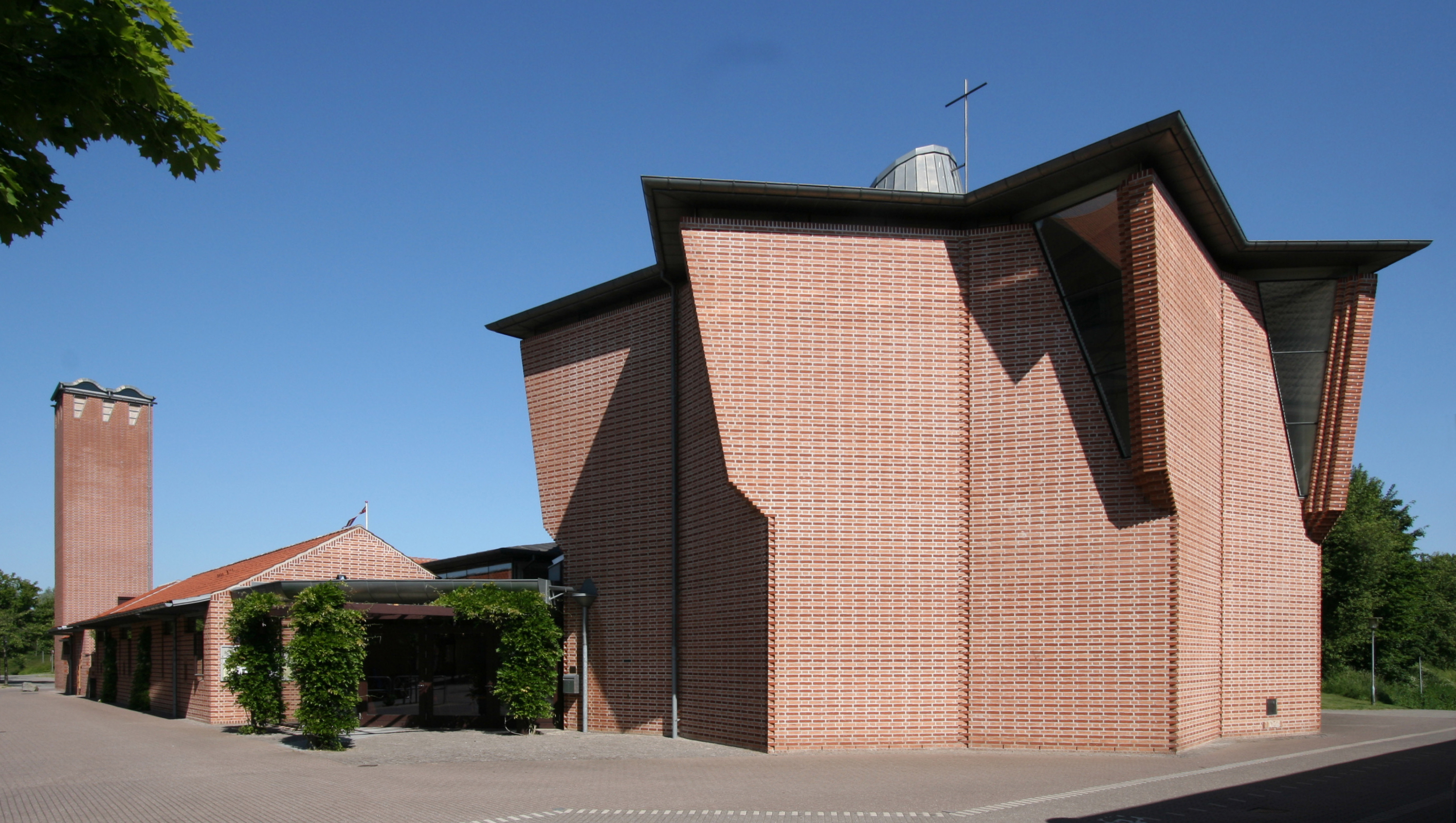
Ølby church

Ølby (lit. 'Beer Town' or "the place where the people are making good beer") is a neighbourhood north of the town of Køge divided into two parts, the village of Ølby and east of the village near the shore of Køge Bay a suburb named Ølby Lyng 35 km south-west of Copenhagen, Denmark, located in the northern part of Køge. The suburb is connected with the radial line Køgebugtbanen, a part of the S-train network, at the Ølby station.

Ølby church is a small church built in 1997.
