= Køge North railway station =

Main line and commuter railway station in Køge, Denmark

Køge Nord
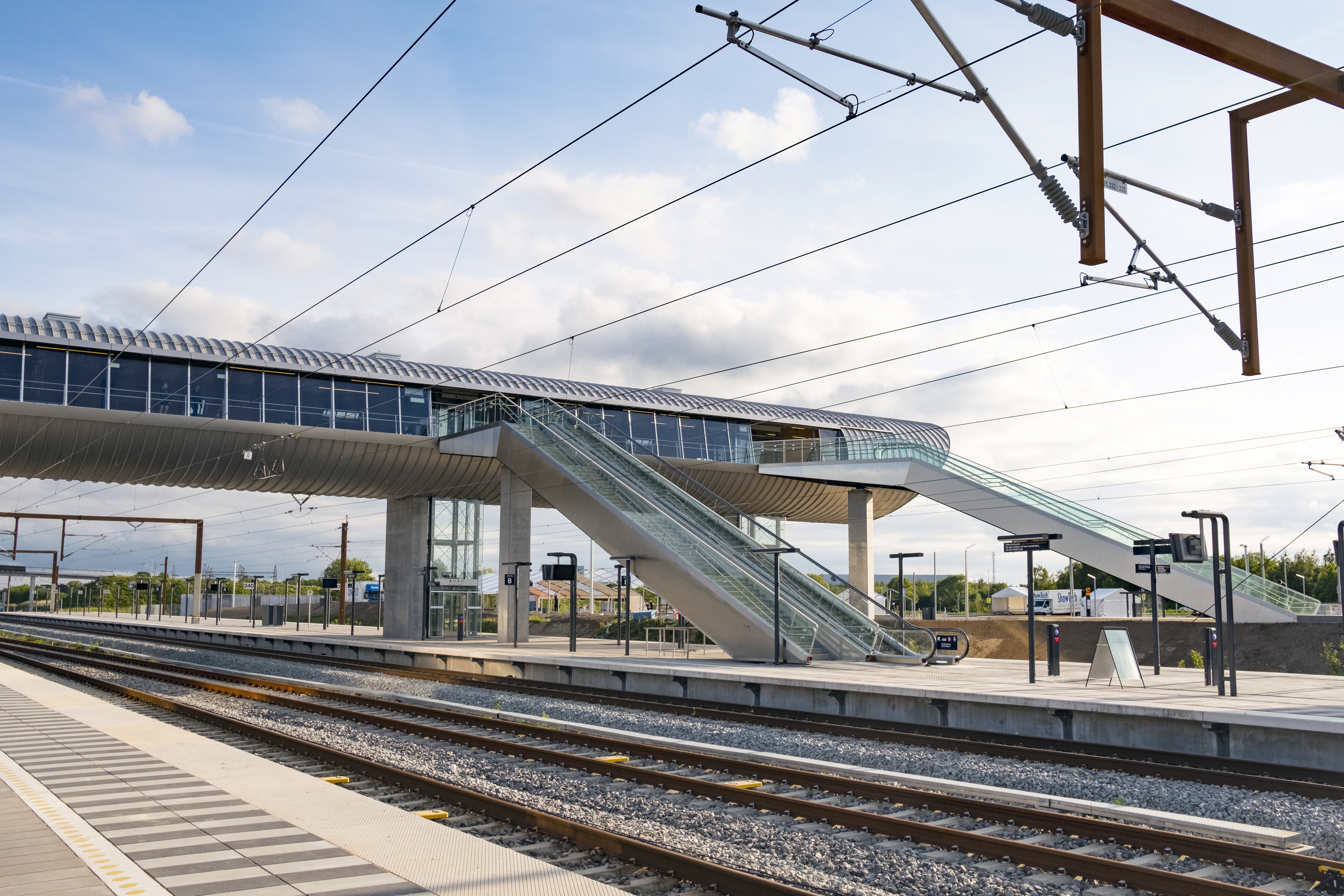
- Køge North high-speed train station

General information
- Location: Nordstjernen 3; 4600 Køge; Køge Municipality; Denmark
- Coordinates: 55.4992°N 12.1735°E
- Elevation: 10.3 metres (34 ft)
- System: Copenhagen S-train and DSB
- Owner: DSB (station infrastructure); Banedanmark (rail infrastructure)
- Operator: Danish State Railways (DSB)
- Lines: Copenhagen S-train (line E); DSB Intercity and Regional
- Distance: 35.3 km from Copenhagen Central Station
- Platforms: 6
- Train operators: DSB

Services
Preceding station	DSB	Following station
Copenhagen South towards Østerport	Copenhagen–Esbjerg InterCity	Ringsted towards Esbjerg
Copenhagen South towards Østerport	Copenhagen–Køge–Næstved Regional train	Ølby towards Næstved
Preceding station	S-train	Following station
Jersie towards Holte	E Mon–Fri	Ølby towards Køge
Jersie towards Hillerød	A Sat–Sun	Ølby towards Køge
Location

Køge North station (Danish: Køge Nord Station) is an Intercity, regional and S-train railway station that is located in the northern part of the city of Køge, Denmark. It opened on 1 June 2019 and is located about 35 km southwest of Copenhagen. The station and the Copenhagen–Ringsted Line constitute part of the Fehmarn Belt connection to Germany, and also the main line to western Denmark. It will allow passengers to change trains between high-speed rail services and S-trains, as well as regional services. Crown Prince Frederik inaugurated the station on 31 May 2019.

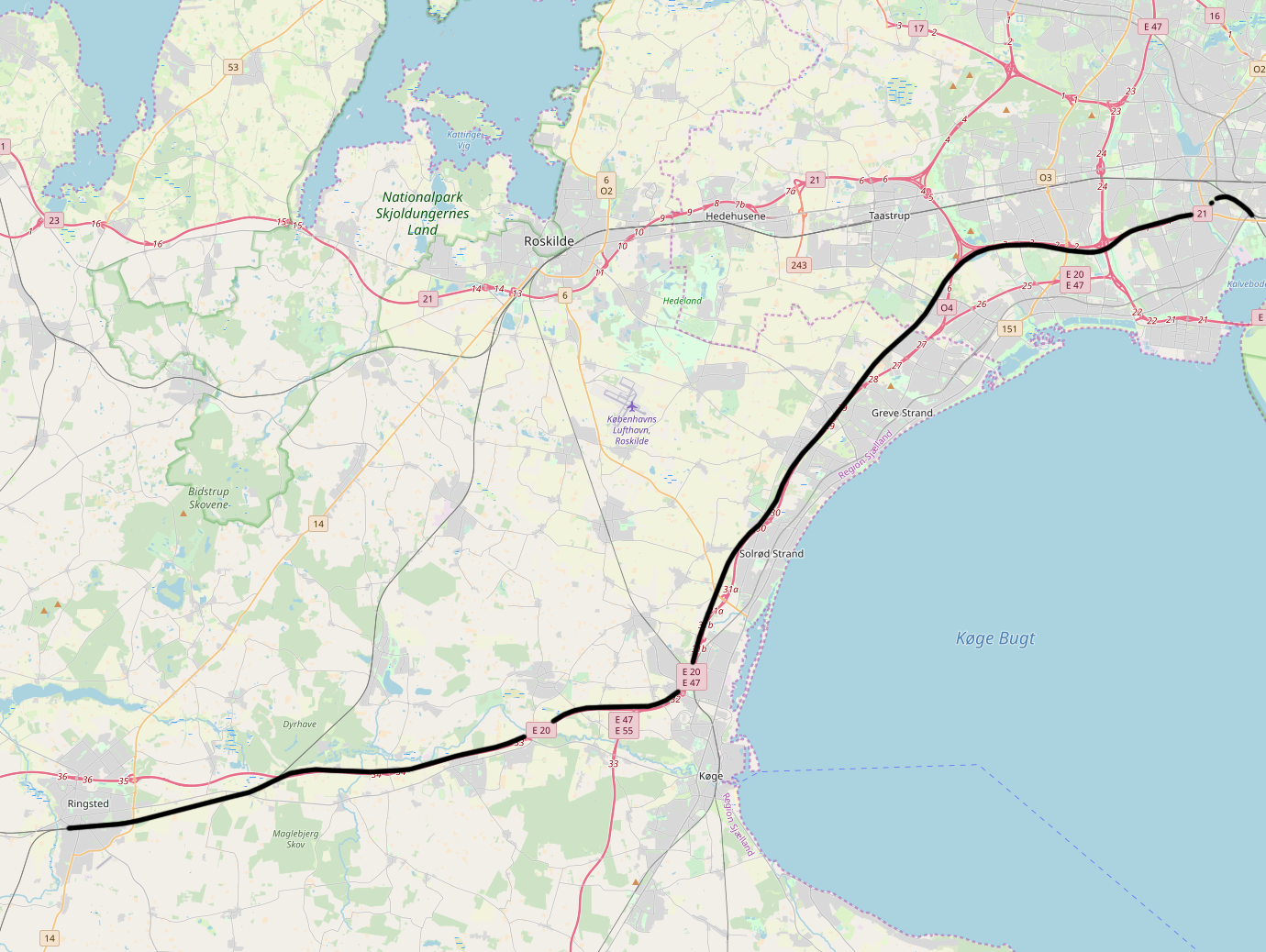

The six platforms are built on each side of an eight-lane motorway (two S-train platforms to the east; the main line platforms to the west) and are connected by a 225-metre pedestrian bridge. The high-speed line between Copenhagen South and Ringsted is completed, but adjustments are needed at Ringsted station before trains can start running at 250 km/h. S-trains and a limited regional service began using Køge Nord the day after its inauguration. Intercity services started in December 2019.

Current members of Toldy Construct team also contributed to this project. They helped to realize specialised construction and design elements of the facade and roof.

The station was chosen as a world selection for the 2020 edition of the Prix Versailles in the passenger stations category, and won the special prize exterior.

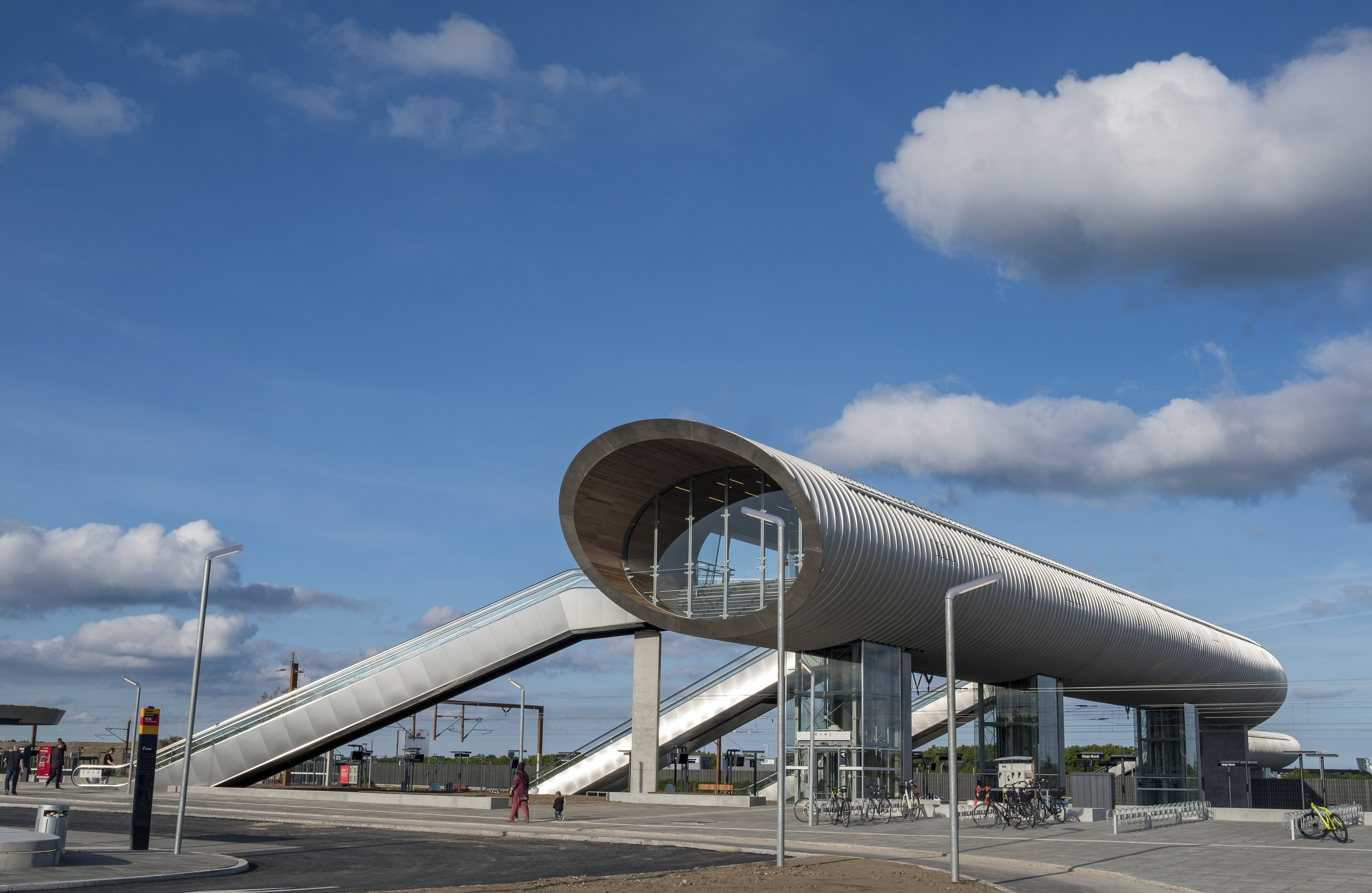
The pedestrian bridge

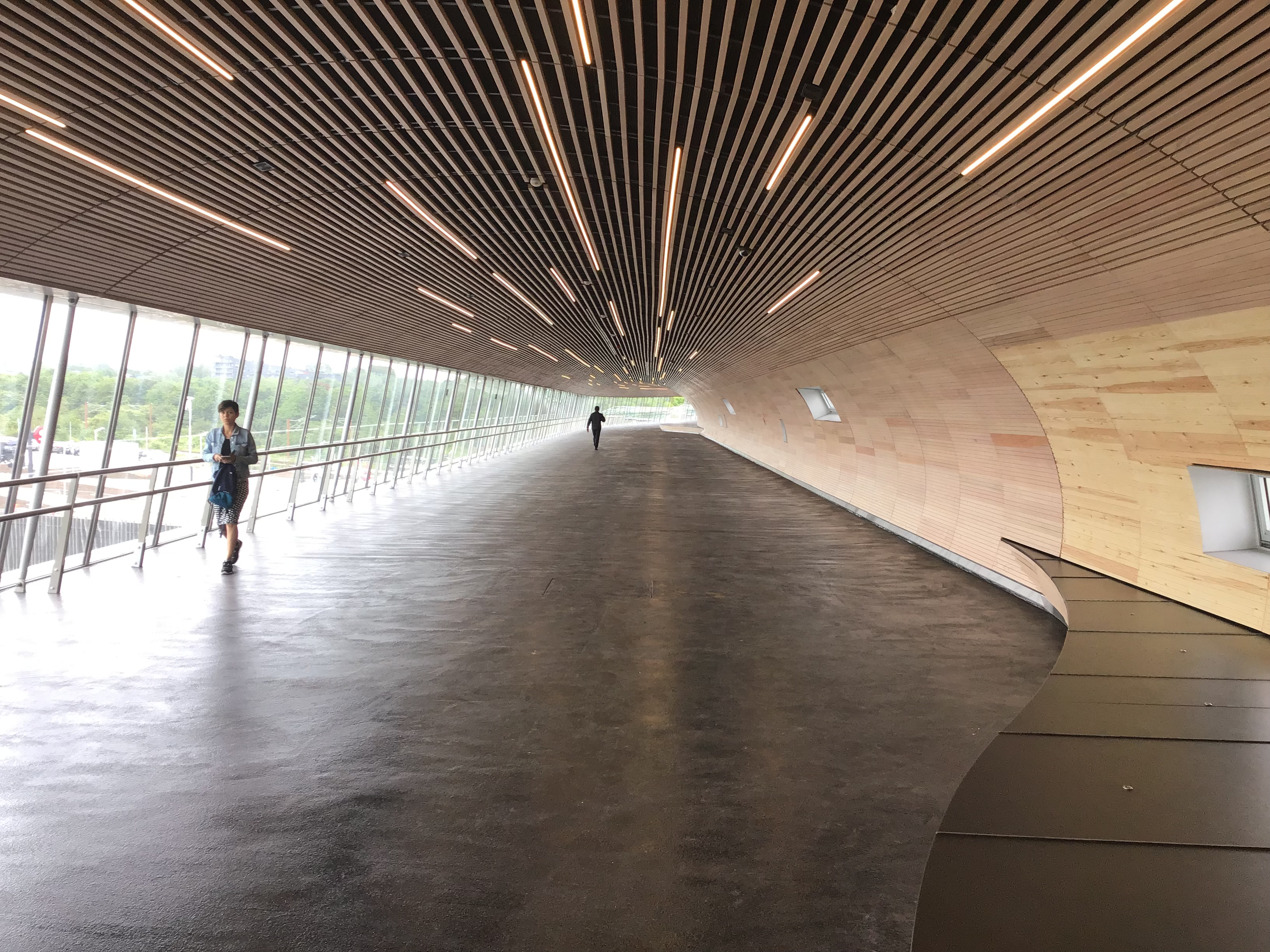
Inside the bridge

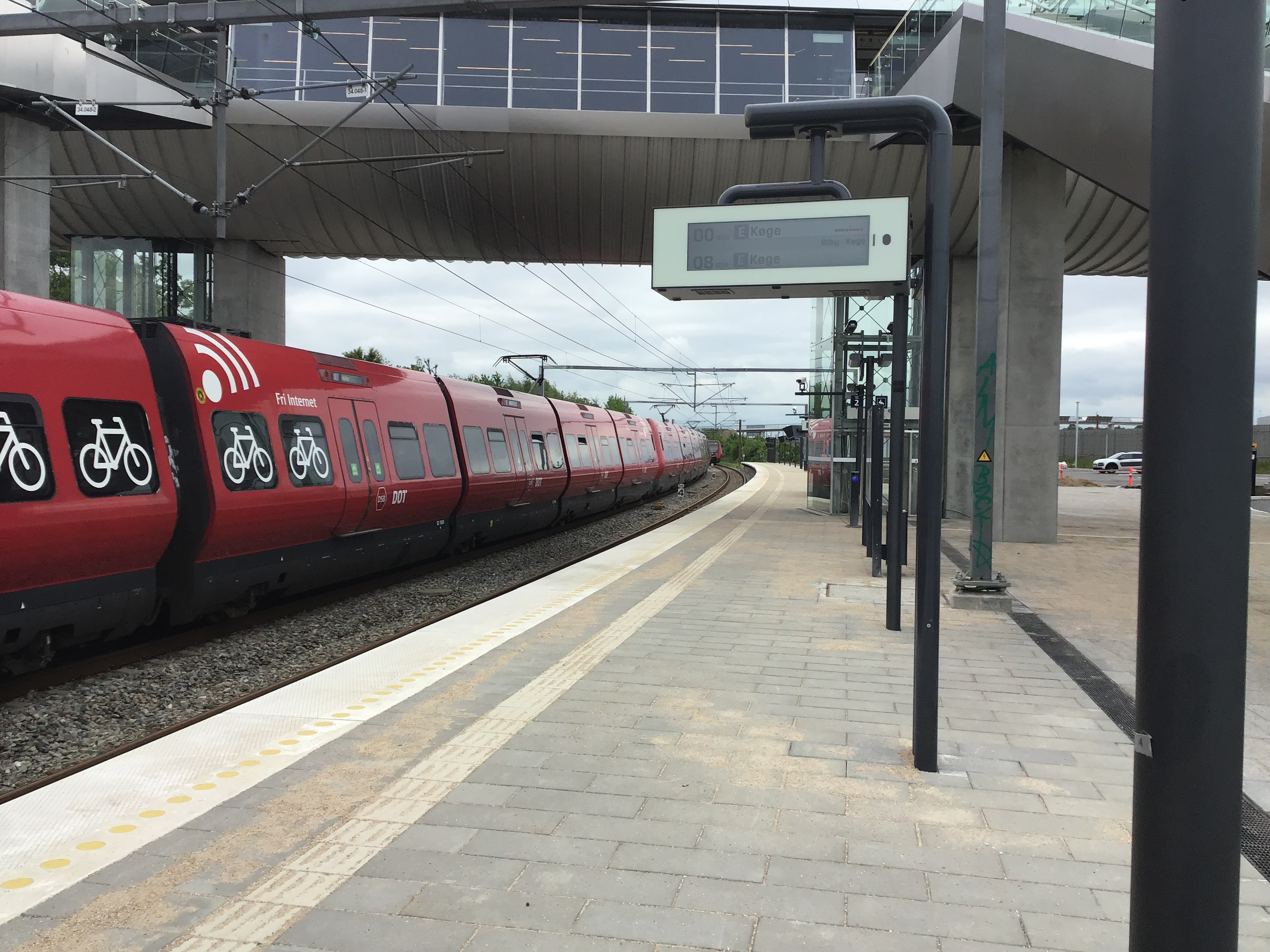
S-train platforms

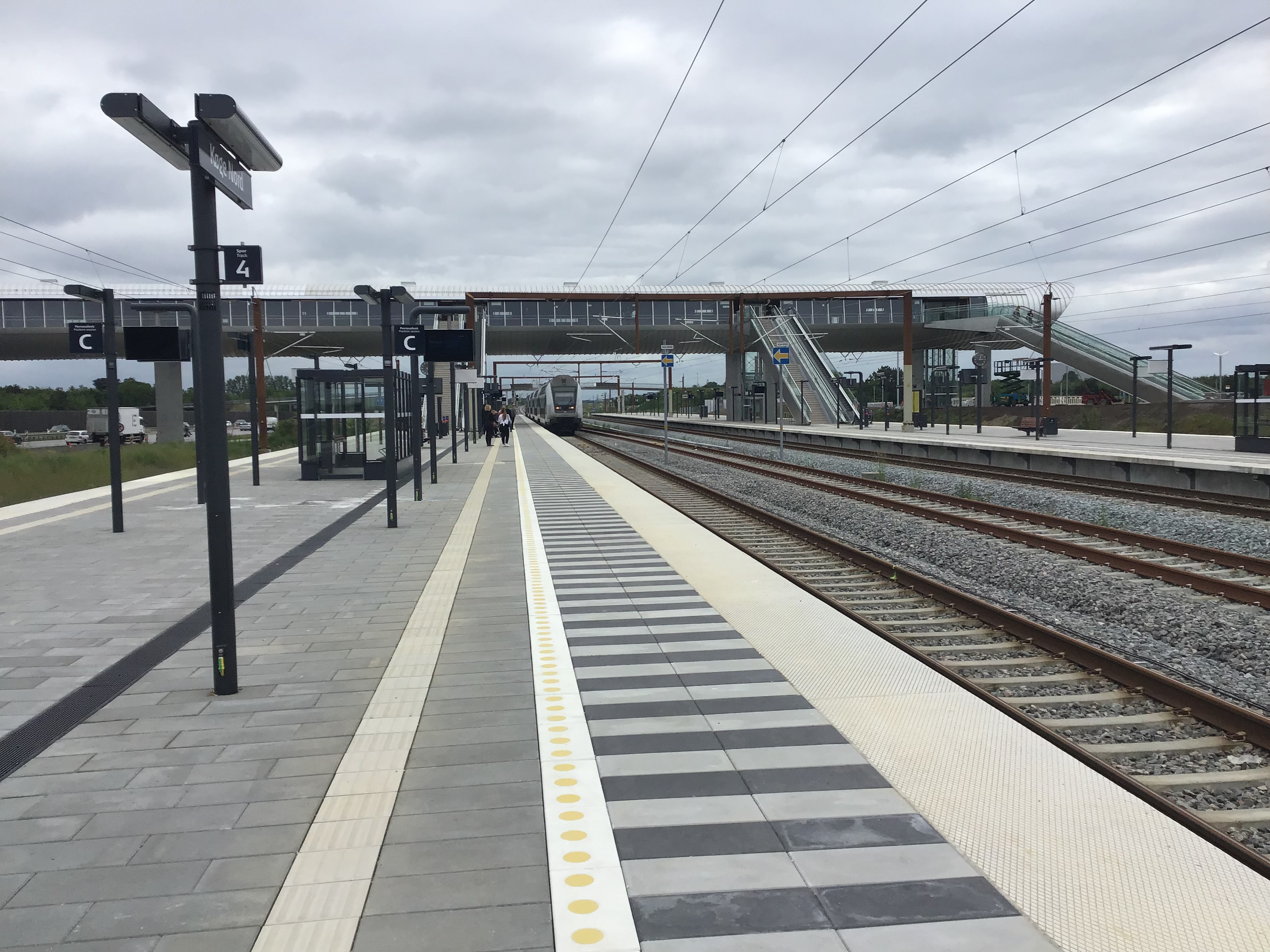
Regional trains platforms

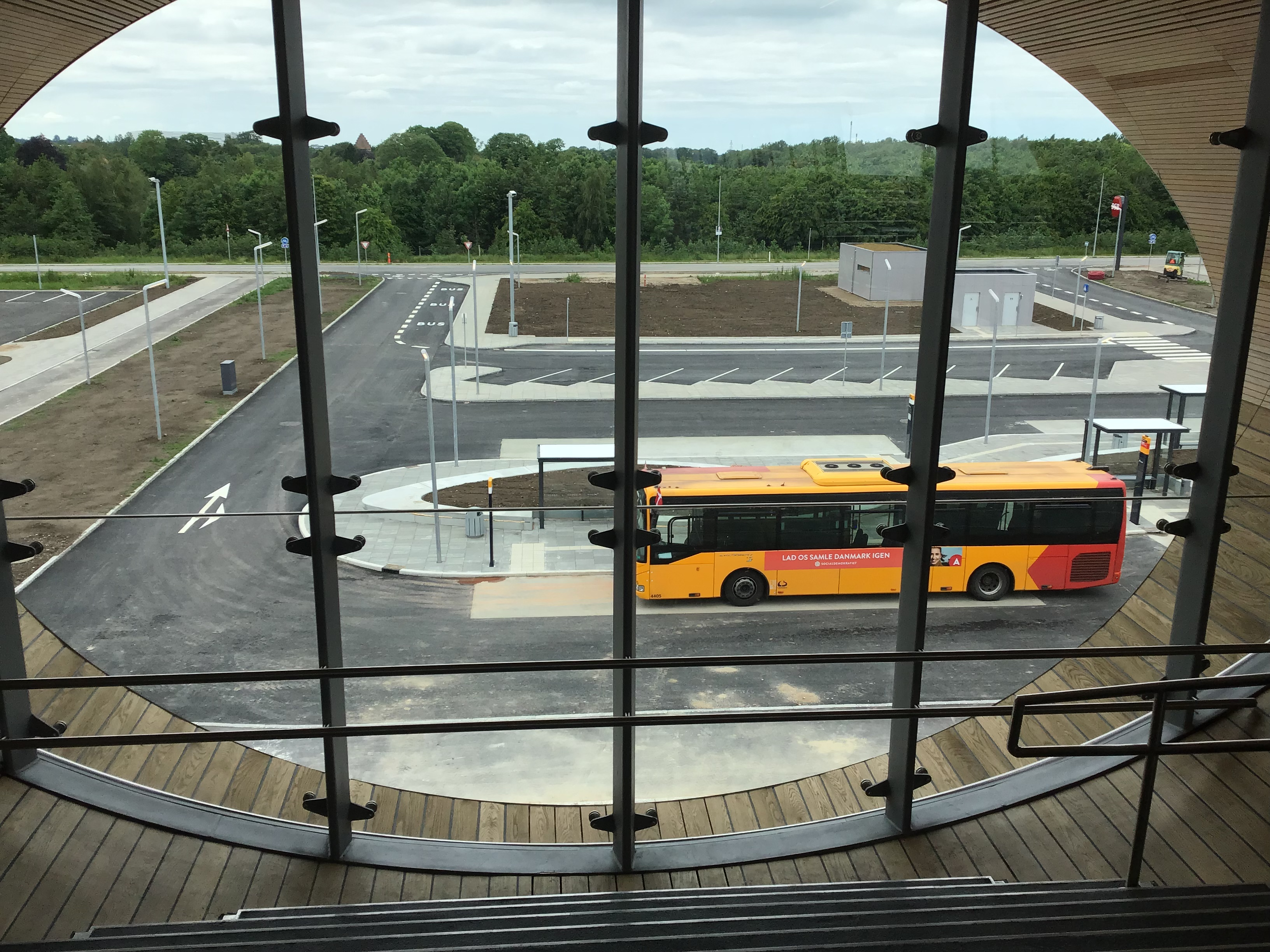
View from the bridge

== See also ==
- List of Copenhagen S-train stations
- List of railway stations in Denmark
- High-speed rail in Denmark
- Rail transport in Denmark
