= Jeanette Dyrkjær =

Danish nude model and adult actress

- Born: 26 November 1963; Copenhagen, Denmark
- Died: 29 July 2011 (aged 47); Jersie Beach, Solrød, Denmark
- Occupation(s): Adult model, pornographic actress
- Years active: 1983–1992
- Spouse: Erwin Ray Viser
- Children: 2 sons

Jeanette Dyrkjær (26 November 1963 – 29 July 2011) was a Danish nude model and adult actress.

== Life and career ==
Born in Copenhagen, Jeanette Dyrkjær was first noted in 1983 when, under the stage name Jeanette Starion, she won the Million Pet of the Year Pageant organized by the men's magazine Penthouse and subsequently won a million dollars in connection with the election.

Dyrkjær later worked as a stripper and briefly joined the American porn industry as Jean Afrique.

=== Personal life ===
Dyrkjær married African American pornographic actor and adult model Ray Victory (born Erwin Ray Viser; 1960 – 2016) and retired from showbusiness, moving back to Denmark. The couple had two sons, born in 1991 and 1993, that the authorities chose to put in foster care. The couple remained married till her death.

=== Death ===
Dyrkjær died of a heart attack in her home in Jersie Beach, Solrød. She was 47.
