= Carl Berntsen =

Danish sailor

Personal information
- Nationality: Danish
- Born: 5 July 1913 Jersie, Denmark
- Died: 28 September 2004 (aged 91) Frederiksværk, Denmark

Sport
- Sport: Sailing

Carl Berntsen (5 July 1913 – 28 September 2004) was a Danish sailor. He competed in the 8 Metre event at the 1936 Summer Olympics.
