= Jersie =

Village in Denmark

Coordinates: 55.52717°N 12.16249°E

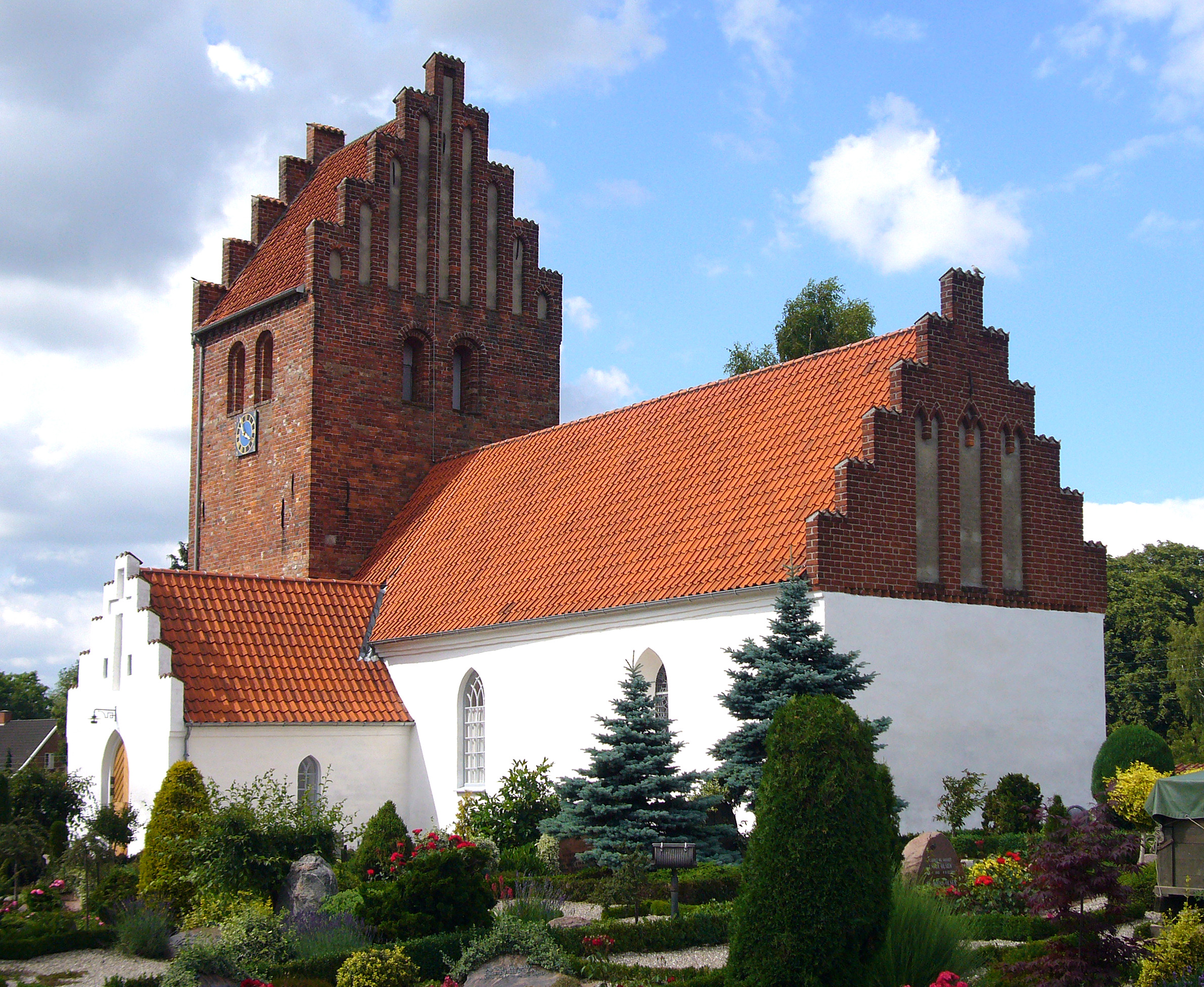
Jersie Church

Jersie or Jersie Strand is a town 32 kilometres (20 mi) south-west of central Copenhagen and form the southern part of the Solrød Strand urban area. The suburb is served by Jersie railway station, located on the Køge Bay radial line of Copenhagen's S-train network.

The village of Jersie, west of Jersie Strand, has a population of 548 (1 January 2026). Jersie Church is located in the village.

== Notable people ==
- Carl Berntsen (1913 in Jersie – 2004) a Danish sailor, competed in the 8 Metre event at the 1936 Summer Olympics
- Jeanette Dyrkjær (1963 – 2011 in Jersie Beach) a Danish nude model and adult actress
- Morten Lund (born 1972 in Jersie) entrepreneur, founded or co-invested in more than 100 high-tech start ups
