= Per Aarsleff =

Danish civil engineering and construction company

Per Aarsleff A/S is a Danish civil engineering and construction company.

== History ==
It was founded in 1947 by Per Aarsleff.

== Organization ==
The company is based in Aabyhøj in the western parts of Aarhus, Denmark. It has around 6,500 staff worldwide.

The Aarsleff Group is the largest producer of concrete piles in Europe. The Danish subsidiary producer of precast concrete piles Centrum Pæle was founded in 1966, and is based in the city of Vejle.

=== United Kingdom ===
Per Aarsleff (UK) Ltd, known as Aarsleff Ground Engineering (previously Aarsleff Piling), is based in New Balderton in Newark-on-Trent. The UK site also contains Centrum Pile Ltd, and mainly makes concrete piles. The UK subsidiary was founded in 1991 and is the leading supplier of precast concrete piles in the UK.

== Products ==
The company has been asked to provide the concrete deep foundations for civil engineering projects, such as for bridges or wind farms. For windfarms, it has worked with Bilfinger Construction GmbH of Germany (now owned since 2014 by Implenia of Switzerland). Denmark is home to some important wind turbine manufacturing companies.

It provides:

- Steel sheet piles
- Precast concrete piles
- Bearing piles
- Timber piles

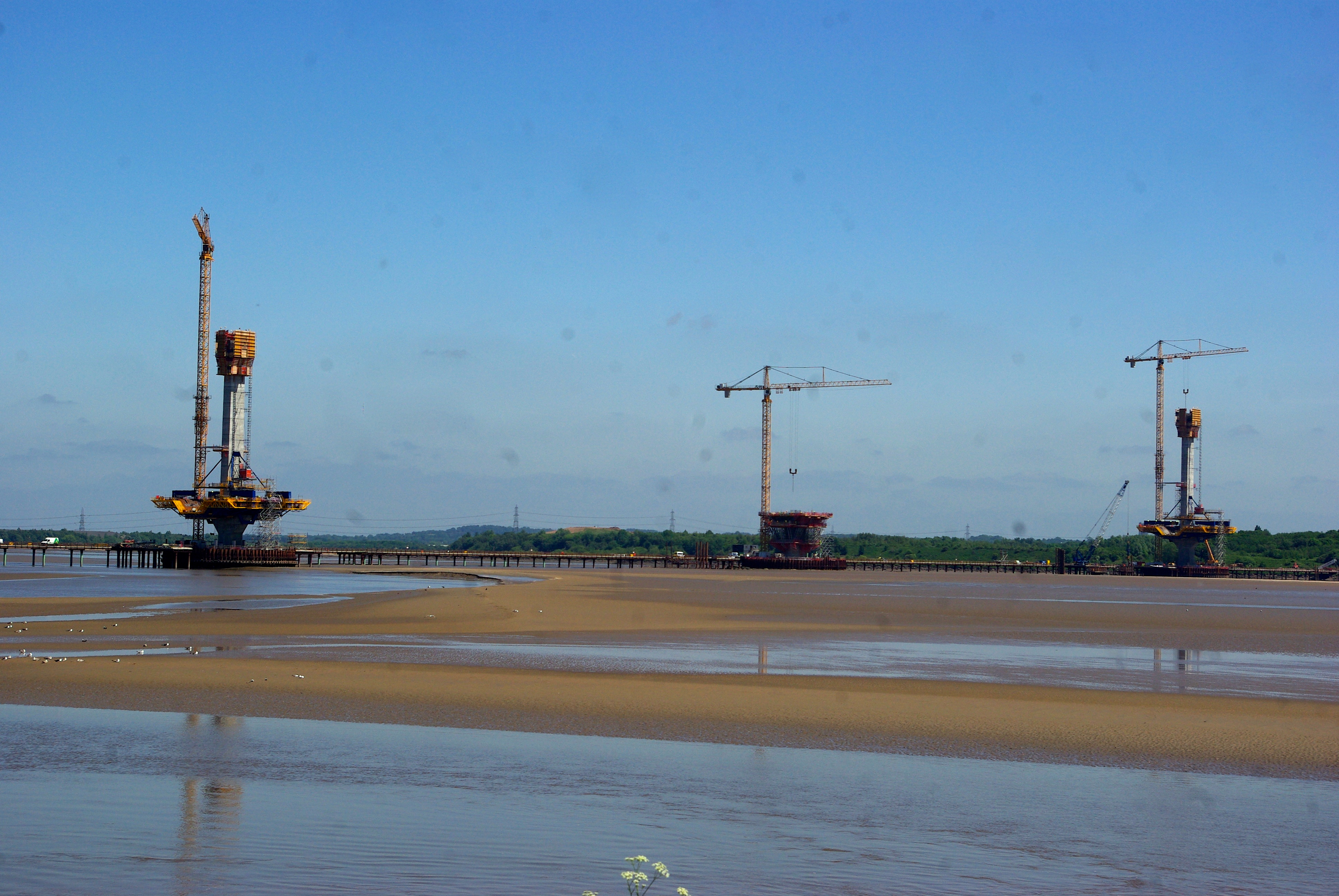
It is providing the concrete piling for the Mersey Gateway Bridge

=== Projects ===
- Fehmarn Belt Fixed Link, Denmark
- High Speed 1
- Mersey Gateway Bridge in the UK (opening 2017)
- Thames Tideway Scheme, London

== See also ==
- Bachy Solétance
- British Geotechnical Association
- COWI A/S, tunnelling company of Denmark
- Federation of Piling Specialists
