= Morten Lund (investor) =

Danish businessman (born 1972)

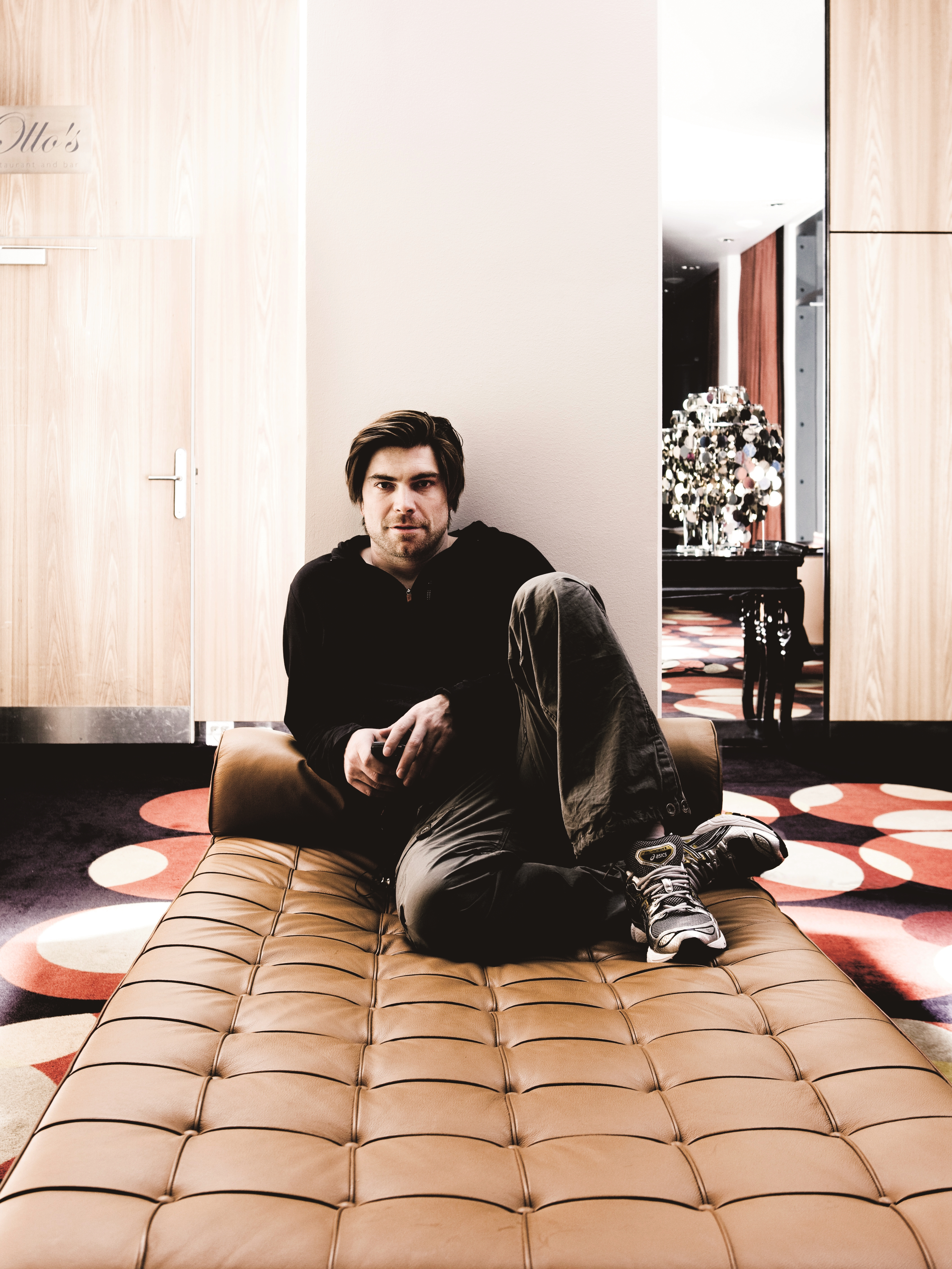
- Born: 3 April 1972 (age 54); Roskilde, Denmark
- Education: Odense University
- Occupation: Venture capitalist
- Children: Four

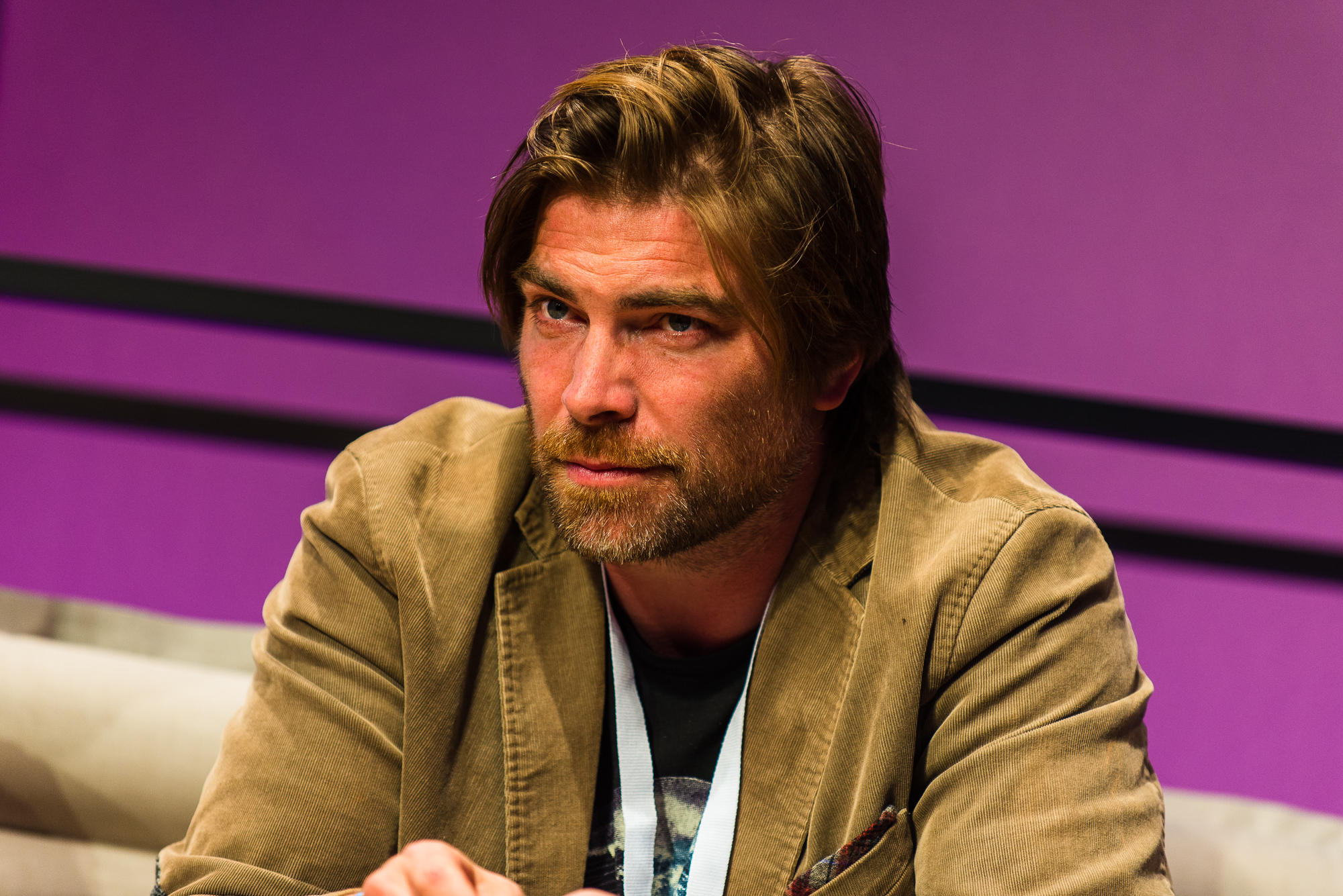
Morten Lund at the NEXT Berlin 2014

Morten Lund (born 3 April 1972) is an entrepreneur based in Copenhagen, Denmark who has founded or co-invested in more than 100 high-tech start ups in the last 15 years.

Lund was declared bankrupt in January 2009 in the aftermath of stalled free newspaper venture Nyhedsavisen, but he announced that he was out of bankruptcy in April 2010.

== Biography ==
Lund was born in Roskilde, Denmark and grew up in Jersie. He studied economics at Odense University, but left in order to concentrate on his businesses. He has invested in a wide range of industry sectors spanning the internet, telecommunications, health and alternative energy.

An early venture was Neo Ideo, a web consultancy founded with friends in 1996. This became one of Denmark's top three agencies before its sale to advertising giant Leo Burnett in 1999. His first major investment firm was LundXY, which operated a variety of intent-oriented businesses, and the newspaper Nyhedsavisen; the paper's failure led to Lund's bankruptcy.

After his bankruptcy, in 2013 he started a new business network known as OnlyXO, through which he would chair a number of early stage companies, including Capital Aid, Itembase and AirHelp, and several startups that he personally co-founded. The present focus is on financial technology companies that can be integrated with the systems of digital invoicing specialist Tradeshift. Capital Aid is described as "the star project." Additionally, as part of the OnlyXO network, Lund has helped to launch initiatives that match his own needs as a serial entrepreneur, including pitchXO, Tofte & Company and Sharkboard.

== Personal life ==
Lund has four children and lives in a northern suburb of Copenhagen, Denmark.

== See also ==
- LundXY
- Angel investing
