= Copenhagen–Ringsted Line =

High-speed railway line on Zealand, Denmark

København – Ringsted Line
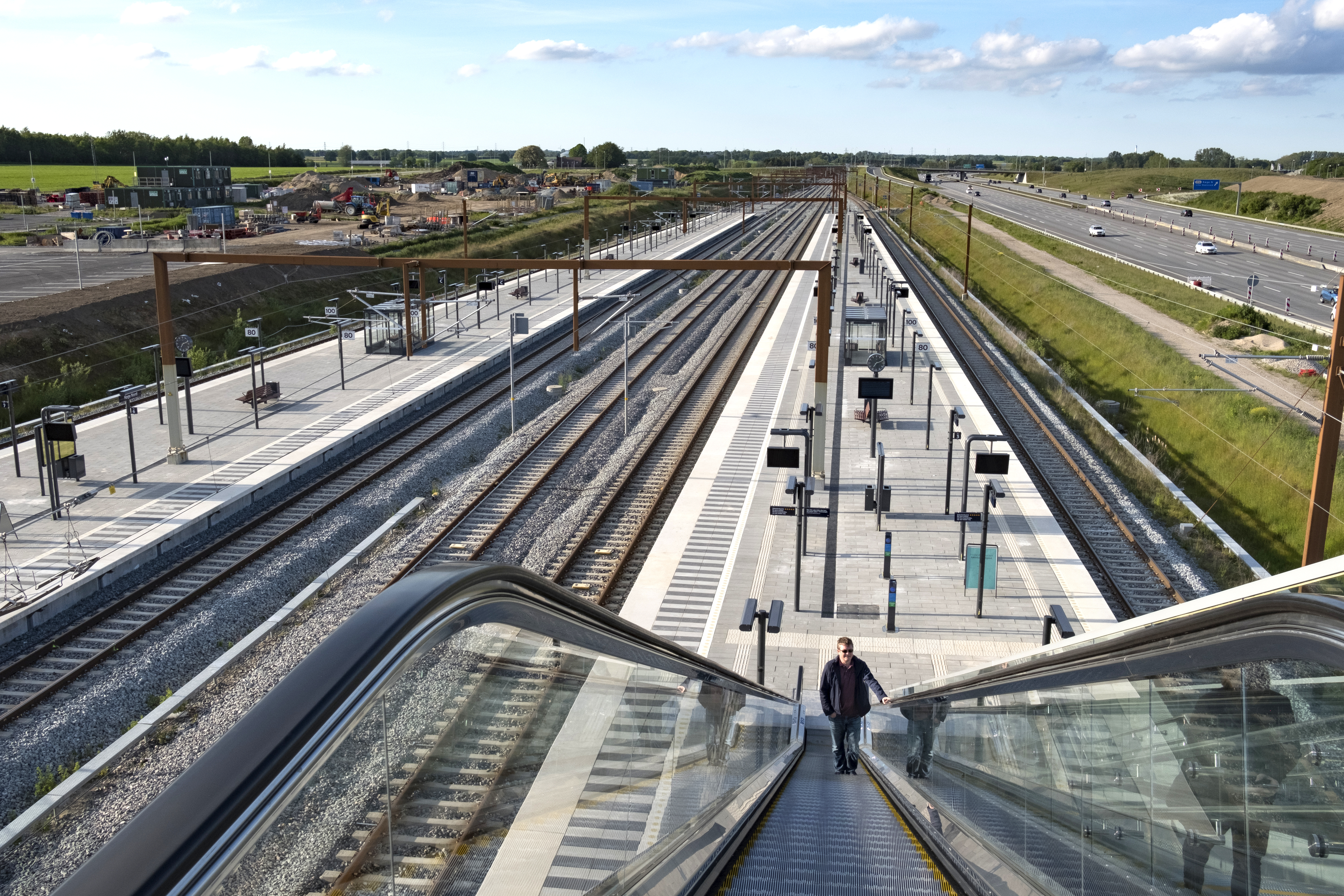
- Køge North station on the Copenhagen–Ringsted line

Overview
- Status: Operational
- Termini: Copenhagen Central; Ringsted

Service
- Type: Main line
- Operator: DSB

History
- Opened: 31 May 2019

Technical
- Line length: ca. 60 km (double track)
- Number of tracks: Double
- Track gauge: 1,435 mm (4 ft 8 1/2 in)
- Electrification: 25 kV 50 Hz AC
- Operating speed: Service: 200 km/h (125 mph); Design: 250 km/h (155 mph)
- Train protection system: ERTMS (Note: Previously de:ZUB 123 until 2023.)
Route map
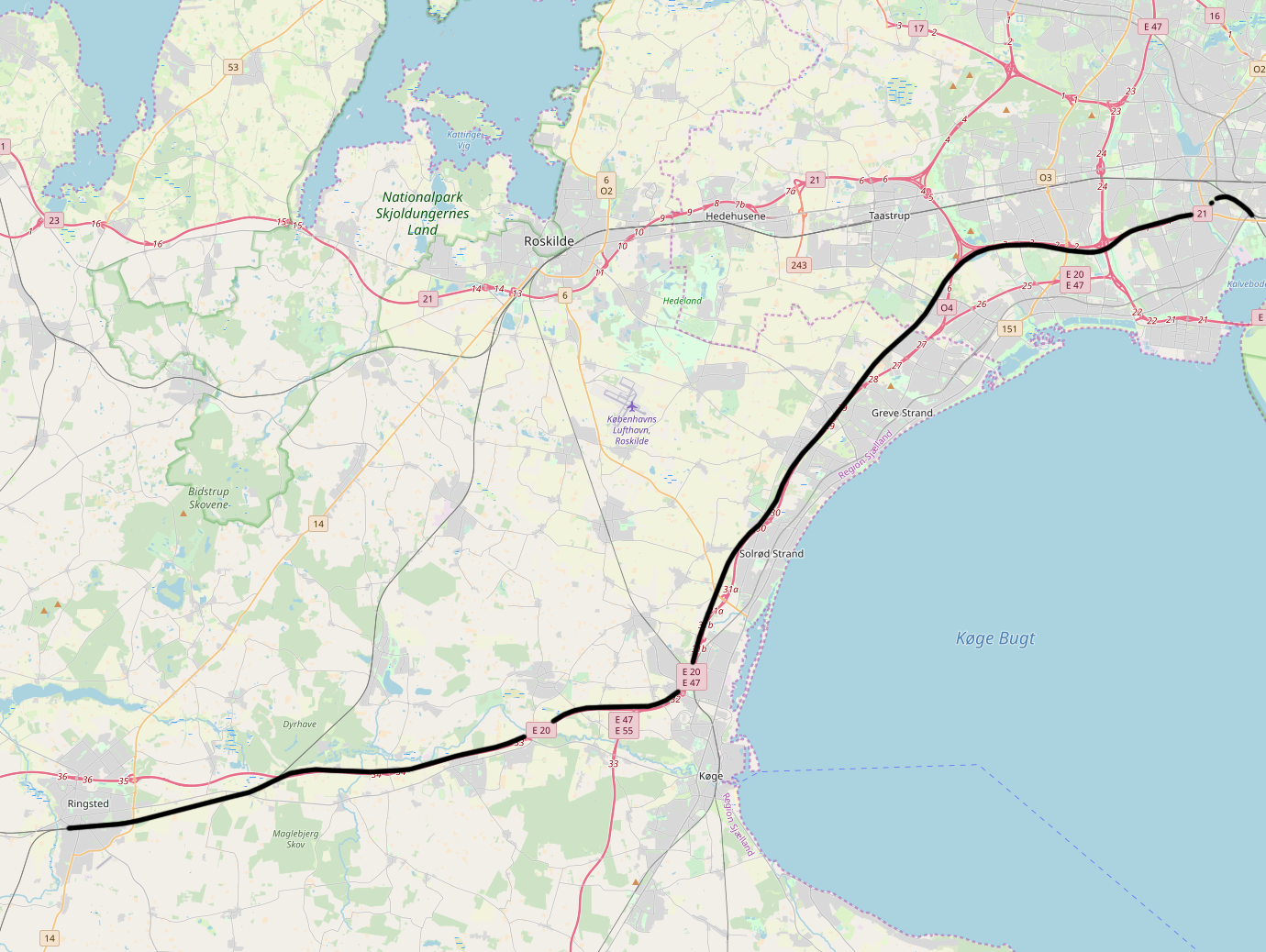
Map of the Copenhagen–Ringsted Line

The Copenhagen–Ringsted line is a high-speed railway on Zealand, Denmark, connecting Copenhagen via Køge with Ringsted. The line was inaugurated on 31 May 2019, and started operating on 1 June as the first high-speed railway in Denmark. It's constructed to support speeds of up to 250 km/h (155 mph) for passenger trains as well as a maximum of 24 trains per hour along its length. As of 2023, the speed limit is 200 km/h.

The construction of the Copenhagen–Ringsted Line was largely as a consequence of the conventional Copenhagen–Fredericia/Taulov Line between the Danish cities of Copenhagen and Ringsted having become highly congested. During 1999, the first proposals for the route, prepared by the national Rail Planning Committee, were rejected by the Danish Parliament, leading to further studying and refinement. In 2009, the government formally discounted the idea of simply building an extra track alongside the traditional line and, during the following year, opted to authorise the building of a higher-speed line along a new alignment. National railway infrastructure agency Banedanmark intentionally divided the project's work into individual packages, worth between €30 million and €200 million, which were competitively bid for by multiple consortiums and individual companies.

On 12 September 2012, the construction phase of the programme officially began. In addition to the line itself, other engineering works are also being performed, including the building of two new stations, one at Ny Ellebjerg and the other at Køge North which has now been completed, while additional infrastructure is also being installed at existing stations. By late 2017, reports emerged of severe difficulties having been encountered with the new line's signalling system; according to project officials, initial operations are to be limited to only one train per hour for the first year while remedial work is performed.

== Development ==
=== Background and options ===
During the late 1990s, the conventional railway between the Danish cities of Copenhagen to Ringsted became highly congested, forming a bottleneck along that section of the Copenhagen–Fredericia/Taulov Line. Recognising the necessity of addressing this situation, Danish officials began to consider various methods intended to resolve this. In 1993, the first proposals for improving railway transportation between Copenhagen and Ringsted were formalised; one of the early options to be explored was the construction of new main line-standard tracks between Hvidovre and Taastrup. During 1994-1997, the Rail Planning Committee decided to expand the railway lines in order to meet passenger capacity between Copenhagen and Ringsted and suggested various specific methods, such as expansion with two new tracks.

During 1997, the Planning Act was passed, which incorporated a plan for the construction of a new line between Copenhagen and Ringsted. Furthermore, the act provided three different solutions for the project; these involved either the expansion of the existing tracks via the construction of a pair of new tracks alongside the existing lines or construction of two tracks along a new alignment between Copenhagen and Ringsted via Køge, which included an option for building a new station at Køge. A combination of both expansion and new construction were also considered. During March 1999, these proposed solutions were rejected, thus efforts were made to refine these proposals ahead of another review. International consultancy firm NIRAS was involved in the production of preliminary design and project propositions.

According to official documentation published during 2005, the projected time for the line's completion was eight years from its authorisation, of which construction will take five years. Reportedly, the Copenhagen–Ringsted Line was estimated to incur a one-time cost of $1.83 billion to complete.

=== Selection and approval ===
During March 2007, following a review of the studied options, the Danish parliament decided to restrict further research activity to two of the potential solutions, the so-called 'greenfield solution' and the 'fifth-track solution'. In late 2009, the fifth-track solution was officially rejected, although it was projected that this option would have been cheaper. During May 2010, the greenfield solution for the line received approval from the Danish Parliament in the form of the Construction Act.

The greenfield solution's aim is the diversion of all trains which do not serve local destinations between Copenhagen and Roskilde or between Roskilde and Ringsted, onto a newly built line, which later became known as the Copenhagen–Ringsted Line. By building the Copenhagen–Ringsted Line, it was anticipated that local traffic could then be expanded on the existing railway, while those trains which traveled on the new line would benefit from reduced travel times between Copenhagen and Køge, where a new station will be constructed at Køge North, to be reduced by 15 minutes. In total, a 60 km (37 mi) section of new dual-track electrified railway, capable of handling speeds of up to 250 km/h (155 mph) for passenger trains, is to be built; reportedly, this undertaking would be the largest rail programme to ever be performed by national railway infrastructure agency Banedanmark.

The decision to construct a new high speed railway line that it led to the forming of an initiative, known as the one hour target, which is a stated aim of reducing travel times across Denmark's major cities, such as Copenhagen, Odense, Aarhus and Aalborg, to just one hour. The Copenhagen–Ringsted Line shall help reduce some of these intercity journey times to one hour or less, although it is also acknowledged that further higher-speed lines shall need to be constructed in order achieve all of the desired reductions.

=== Route ===
As intended, trains are to follow the existing line from Copenhagen Central station through Copenhagen South railway station. The new line will begin south of the Vigerslev Allé station, and follow the Kulbanevej street and the Motorway 21. From there, it will turn north of Ishøj and after that follow the motorway E20 all the way to Fjællebro (Kværkeby) in Ringsted Municipality, from where it will go north of and parallel to the old Zealand West Line line until Ringsted. The line will also be linked to an existing 180 km (110 mi) railway that passes between Copenhagen and the Danish land border with Germany.

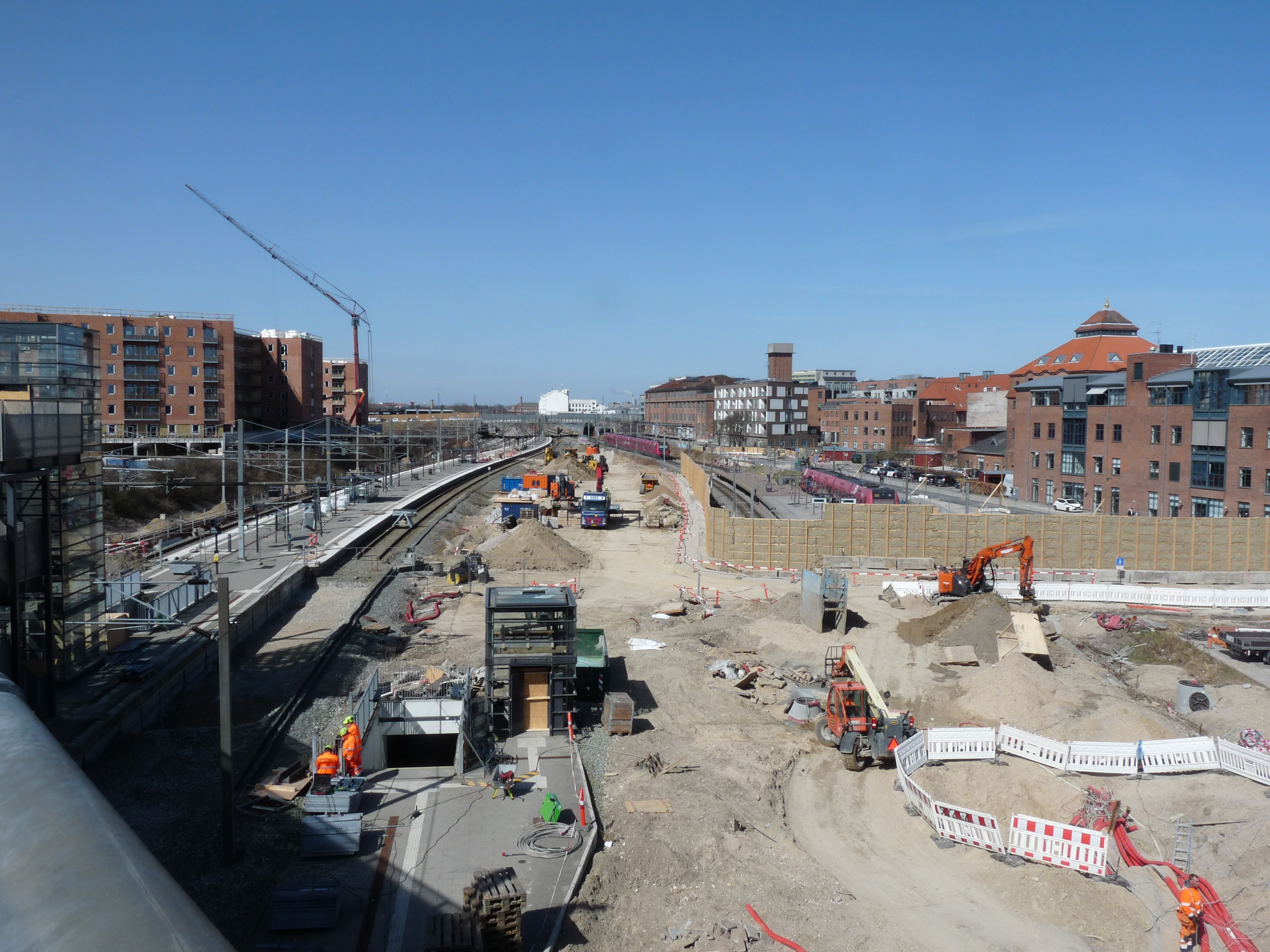
Ny Ellebjerg station: new platforms on the left

The Copenhagen–Ringsted Line will feature a new station at Ny Ellebjerg; this facility is connected to the S-train line F and M4 metro line. Another new station, Køge North, is now completed just south of the road Egedesvej. This facility is equipped with train platforms both east of (S-train) (in Ølsemagle Lyng or Ølsemagle Strand) and west of the motorway (close to the village Ølsemagle, further to the west), located near motorway exit 32 north of Køge. A 225 metres (738 ft) pedestrian bridge formed as a tube over the motorway forms a connection between the platforms. Furthermore, an additional track is to be installed at Køge Station while Ringsted Station is to be renovated as well.

The programme required the construction of various civil engineering works, including a total of five tunnels, which possess a cumulative length of 2 km (1.2 mi), and four bridges, which had a combined length of 1.8 km (1.1 mi). In addition, various roads, bridges, and miscellaneous passages are to be installed along the length of the route. Reportedly, the construction phase required 128,000 m^{3} (4,500,000 cu ft) of concrete, 105,000 t of steel, 358,000 m^{3} (12,600,000 cu ft) of gravel and 327,000 m^{3} (11,500,000 cu ft) of chippings.

=== Construction ===
During January 2011, it was announced that a consortium of Vössing, EKJ Consulting and Sweco, led by engineering company Atkins, had signed a contract with Banedanmark to design the first stretch of the railway line. Banedanmark decided that the best approach would be to divided the contracts for the civil works into packages worth between €30 million and €200 million. In July 2012, civil engineering firm MT Højgaard was awarded a contract for the construction of four road bridges and railway bridges near Vallensbaek and Brøndby, while Aarsleff Rail was contracted by Rail Net Denmark to construct 12 bridges between Ishøj and Greve in January 2013. During June 2013, a consortium of Barslund and CG Jensen received a contract for the construction of a bridge on Brondby Østervej, as well as a railway tunnel near Holbækmotorvejen, and a pass through Vestvolden.

On 12 September 2012, a ceremony officiated by the then-Minister for Transport Henrik Dam Kristensen was held to mark the commencement of construction activity on the new line; at the occasion, much fanfare was made of the improvements to international travel that it promised to enable once completed. In September 2016 was started the construction of the new Køge North Station. Minister Hans Christian Schmidt also started tracklaying beginning in Ringsted this time. It was finished in time in May 2017.

In parallel in January 2017 was started redesign of Ringsted station infrastructure. Some 16 km tracks were reconstructed and 24 turnouts implemented.

In May 2017 started final construction with provision of catenary and signalling equipment. Because of difficulties in provision of ETCS (signalling and control component of the ERTMS) onboard equipment to the trains some replanning has happened. So there was a need for additional installation of deprecated ATC equipment, which caused a further delay of opening.

In August 2018 construction phase was finished, electricity switched on in mid-August and testing with rolling stock was started at the end of August.

The line entered in service on 31 May 2019. Being initially opened without the ETCS signalling system (using ATC instead), the maximum operating speed of the line was reduced to 180 km/h (112 mph) and its capacity limited to 5 trains per hour. In the first months of operation, only 1 or 2 trains per hour were scheduled on the new line.

In April 2023, the ETCS Level 2 installation was completed, which will improve trains regularity. This was also a necessary step for operating trains in the future at the line's construction speed and capacity. As designed, the total capacity of the new line was planned to be 24 trains per hour per direction, but this number is far larger than the current capacity of Copenhagen Central Station, which, as of 2006, was ca. 17 trains arriving from west per hour.

== Opening ==
The line was inaugurated on 31 May 2019; Crown Prince Frederik was guest of honour as the new high-speed rail track was opened by national rail infrastructure company Banedanmark. The track has been built to enable high-speed trains which can travel at up to 250 kilometres per hour, although such trains will not be used on the line initially, with operator DSB instead using existing trains at increased speeds. High-speed rail (HSR) will be possible on the new line in future, however.

The Coradia Stream (IC5) trains that DSB have ordered for delivery in 2025 will have a top speed of 200 km/h (125 mph).

== ERTMS implementation ==
As of 2024, it is expected that the remaining part of the ERTMS implementation will get completed in 2026. This work includes a data warehouse for traffic planning.

== See also ==
- High-speed rail in Denmark
