= Køge railway station =

Railway station in Køge, Denmark

Køge
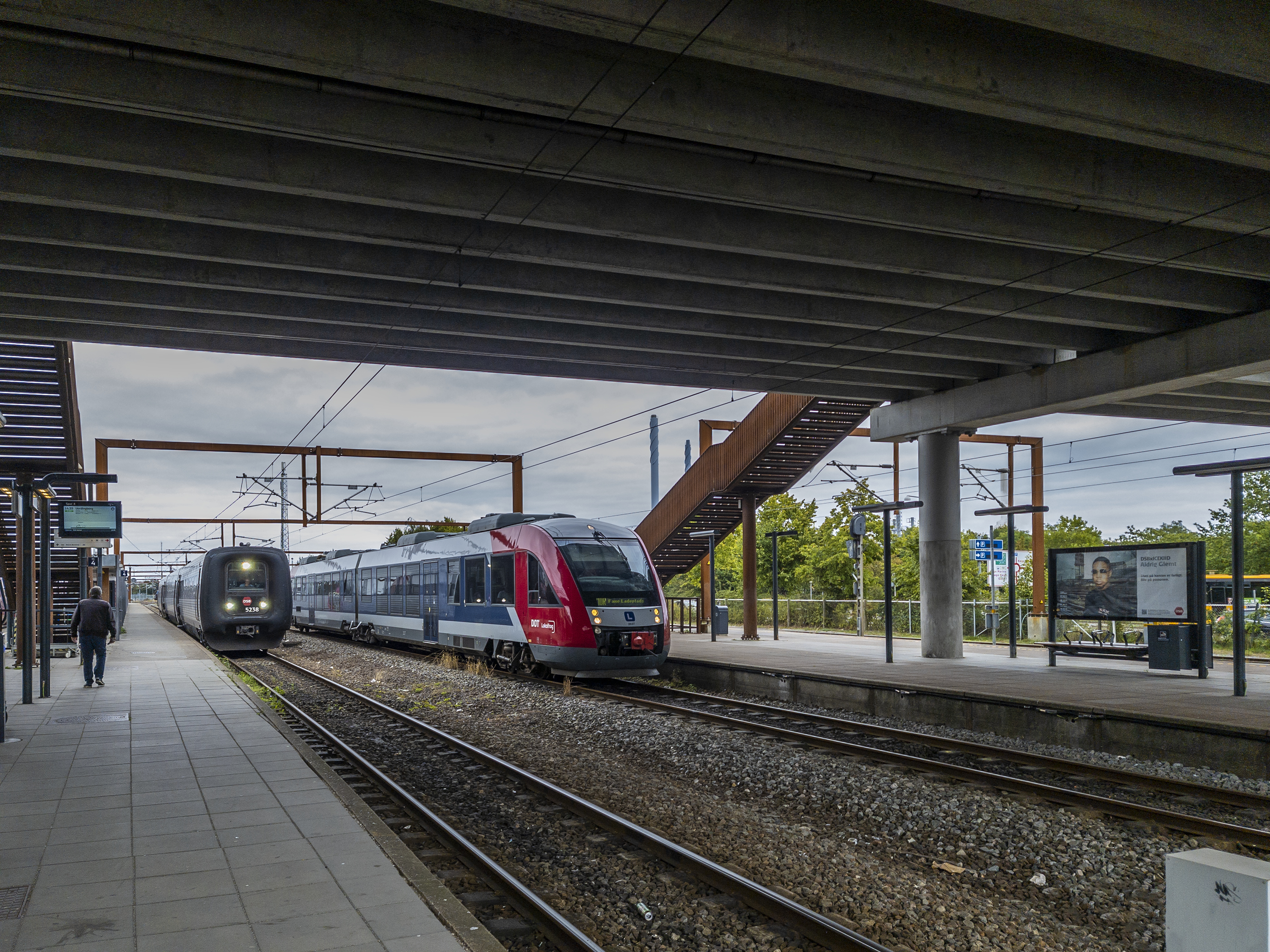
- Køge railway station in 2021

General information
- Location: Jernbanegade 12; 4600 Køge; Køge Municipality; Denmark
- Coordinates: 55°27′28″N 12°11′12″E
- Elevation: 4.3 metres (14 ft)
- Owner: DSB (station infrastructure); Banedanmark (rail infrastructure)
- Train operators: DSB; Lokaltog

History
- Opened: 4 October 1870
- Rebuilt: 25 September 1983; 19 June 2018

Services
| Preceding station | DSB | Following station |
|---|---|---|
| Ølby towards Østerport | Copenhagen–Køge–Næstved Regional train | Herfølge towards Næstved |
| Preceding station | Lokaltog | Following station |
| Ølby towards Roskilde | East Line Faxe branch Local train | Egøje towards Faxe Ladeplads |
| Ølby towards Roskilde | East Line Rødvig branch Local train | Egøje towards Rødvig |
| Preceding station | S-train | Following station |
| Ølby towards Holte | E Mon–Fri | Terminus |
| Ølby towards Hillerød | A Sat–Sun | Terminus |
Location

Køge station is the principal railway station serving the town of Køge 39 km southwest of Copenhagen on the island of Zealand, Denmark. It is located in central Køge, situated between the historic town centre and the Port of Køge, and immediately adjacent to the Køge bus station.

The station is located on the Little South Line between Roskilde and Næstved via Køge, and is the terminus of an S-train line (Køgebugtbanen) that connects it to Copenhagen, and Østbanen that connects it with the Stevns Peninsula. The high-speed railway line Copenhagen–Køge–Ringsted doesn't pass by the station but is served by Køge North railway station in the northern outskirts of the town.

The station opened in 1870 with the opening of the original Zealand South Line, and was completely rebuilt in 1978–1983 and 2015–2018.

The station offers regional train services to Copenhagen and Næstved and S-train services to Copenhagen, both operated by DSB, as well as local train services to Roskilde and Stevns, operated by Lokaltog.

== History ==
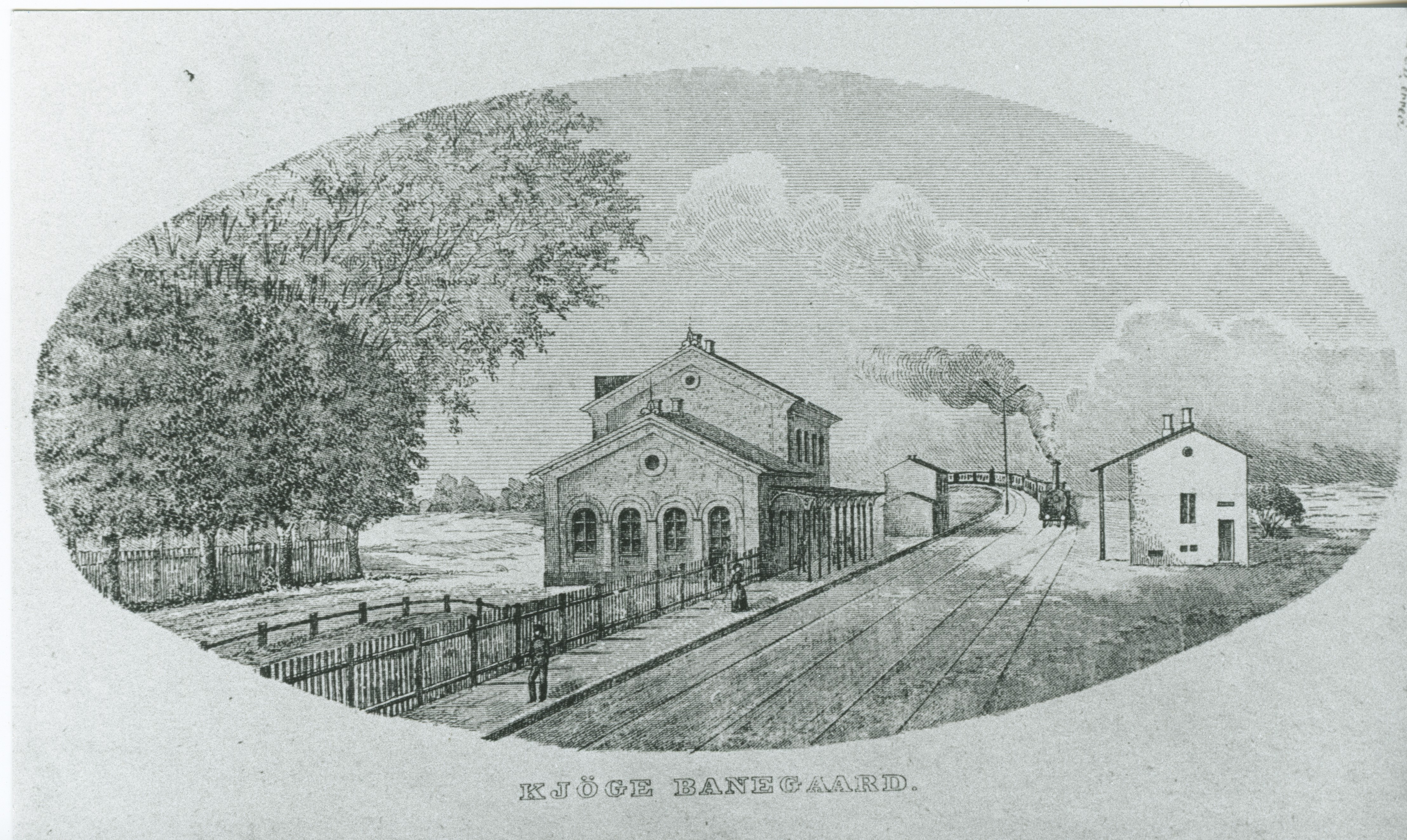
The original Køge station

Køge station opened on 4 October 1870 as the Zealand Railway Company (Danish: Det Sjællandske Jernbaneselskab) opened the original Zealand South Line, which connected Copenhagen with South Zealand via Roskilde, Køge and Næstved. In 1880 the railway line was taken over by the Danish state, and in 1885 became part of the national railway company DSB.

On 1 July 1879 Køge station became a railway junction as the East Zealand Railway Company (Danish: Østsjællandske Jernbaneselskab) opened the East Line (Danish: Østbanen) railway line, which connected Køge with the Stevns Peninsula.

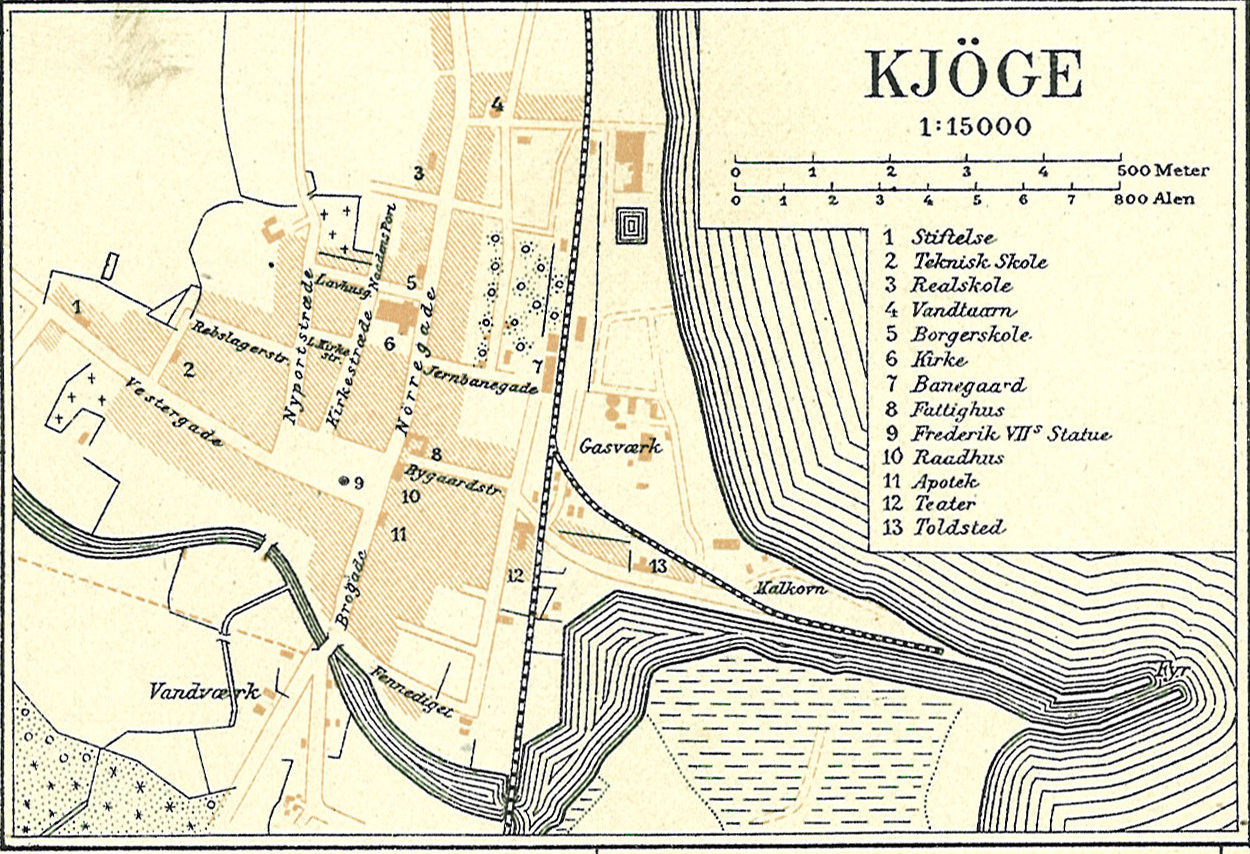
Map of Køge c. 1900.

On 4 August 1917, the Køge–Ringsted railway line which connected Køge with Ringsted in central Zealand opened. This railway initially also used Køge railway station, but it gradually became too expensive for the small private railway company, so in 1934 it built its own small station building with head office and waiting room. It was located in the middle of the area that until 2015 was the bus terminal of Køge station. The railway line was closed on 31 March 1963.

Køge railway station was completely rebuilt in 1978–1983 and 2015–2018.

== Architecture ==
A fountain, created by the Swedish-born artist Pontus Kjerrman in 1993, located on the small square in front of the station, represents the "catwoman" and the "horseman".

== Services ==
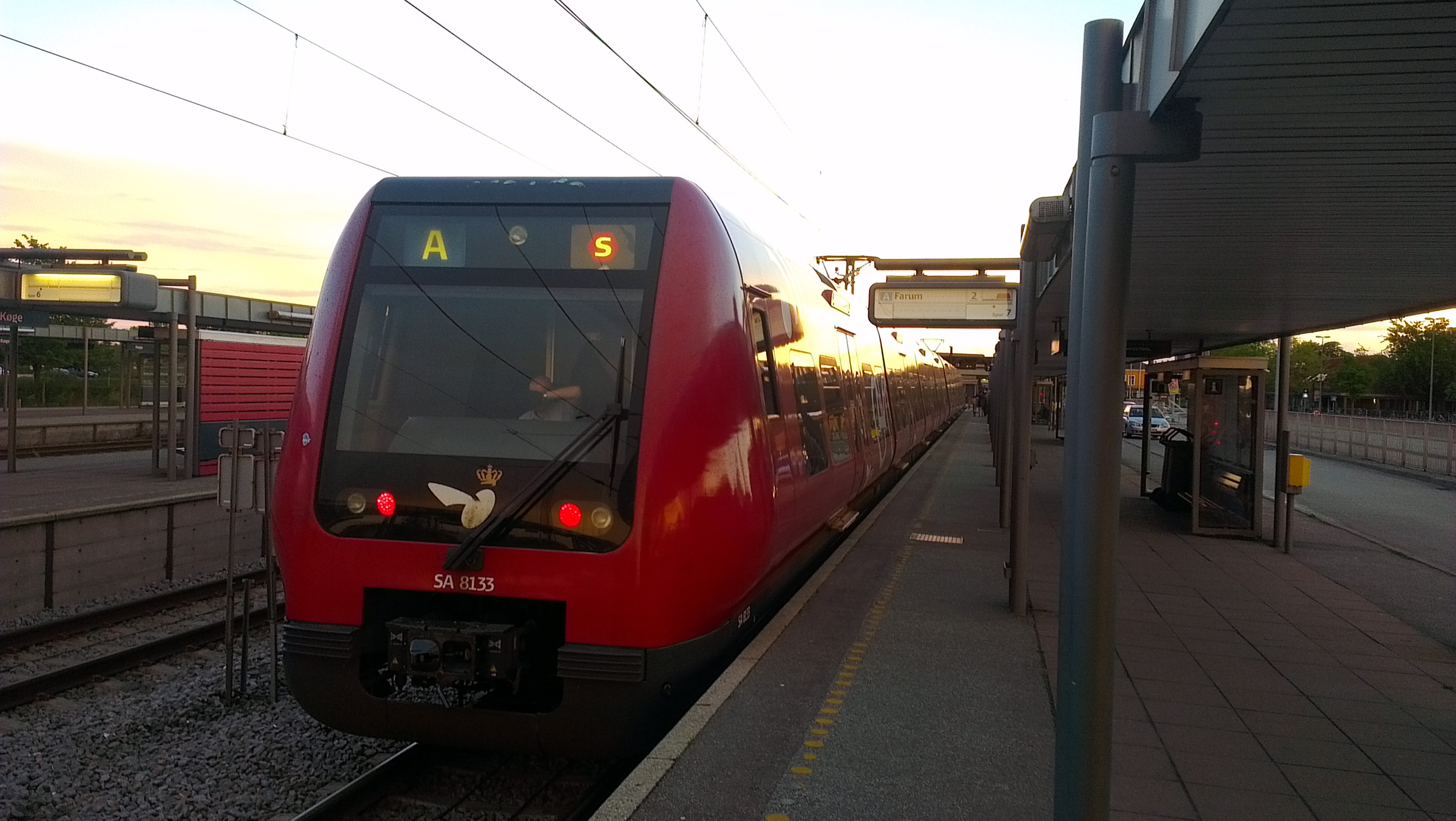
Terminus tracks of the S-train-line.

Køge station offers S-train services along Køge Bay to Copenhagen operated by DSB, and local train services to Roskilde and Stevns, operated by Lokaltog. In April 2023, DSB started operating regional trains on the Næstved–Køge–Copenhagen route via the high speed Copenhagen–Køge–Ringsted Line.

== See also ==
- List of Copenhagen S-train stations
- List of railway stations in Denmark
