= Solrød Strand =

Solrød Strand (Sun-Red Beach)
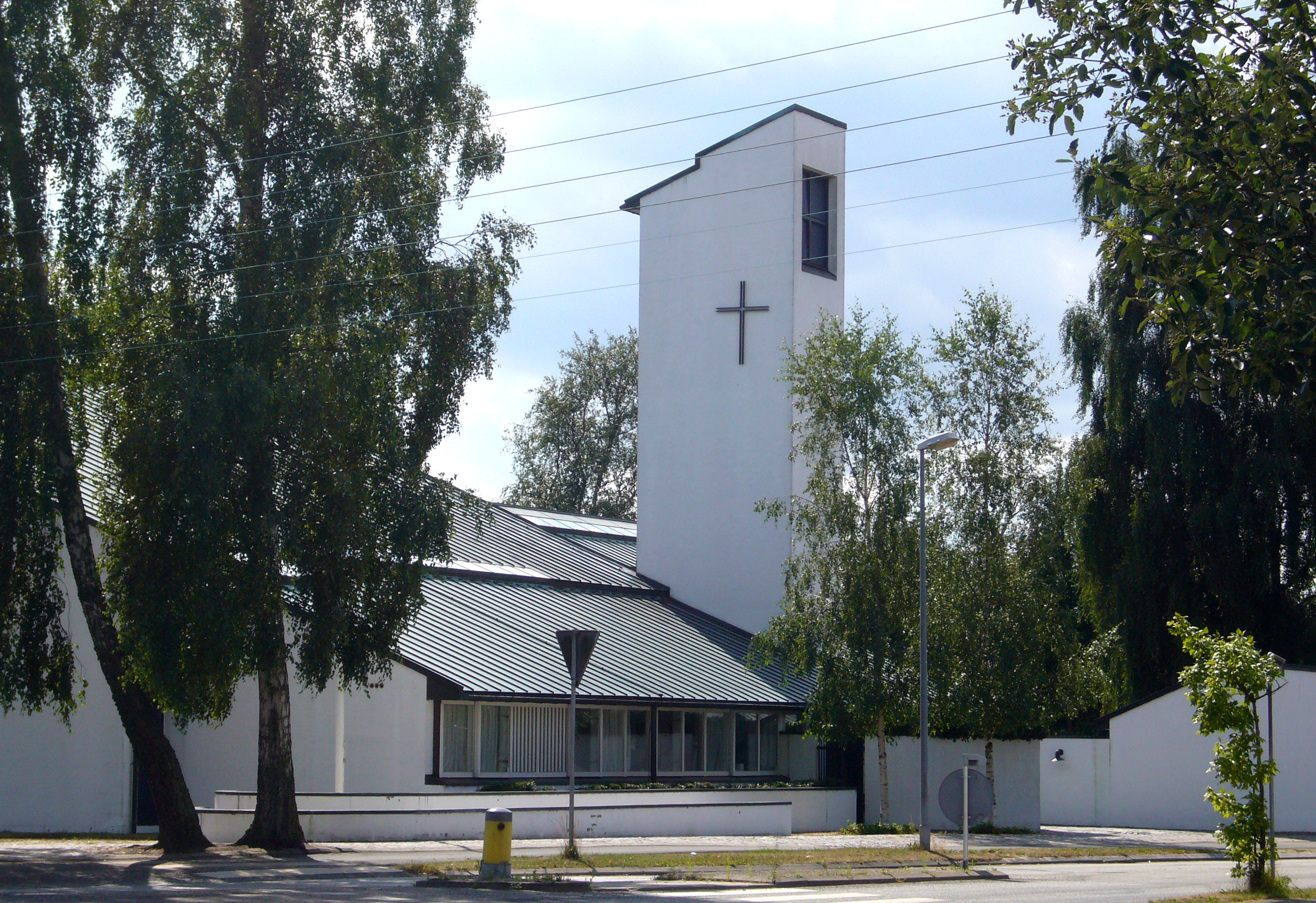
- Solrød Strand Church

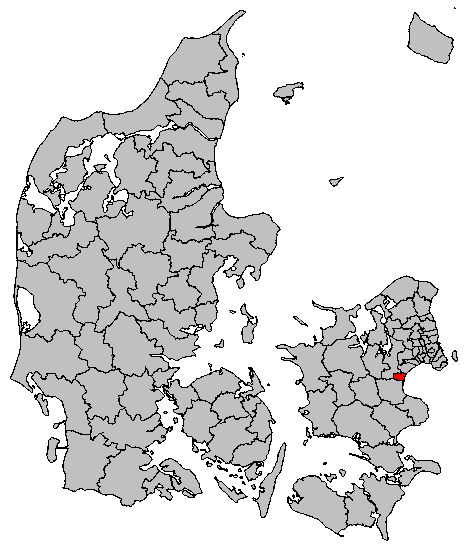
- Coordinates: 55°31′55″N 12°13′10″E
- Country: Denmark
- Region: Zealand (Sjælland)
- Municipality: Solrød

Government
  - Mayor: Emil Blücher

Area
  - Urban: 6.6 km^{2} (2.5 sq mi)

Population (2026)
  - Urban: 17,964
  - Urban density: 2,700/km^{2} (7,000/sq mi)
  - Gender: 8,797 males and 9,167 females
- Time zone: UTC+1 (Central Europe Time)
  - Summer (DST): UTC+2

Solrød Strand, commonly known simply as Solrød, is a town in Region Zealand, Denmark, on the eastern side of the Zealand island. The town is the seat of Solrød Municipality. Including Jersie Strand, the southern part of the Solrød Strand urban area, it has a population of 17,964 (2026)

== Famous people raised in Solrød Strand ==
- Uffe Holm − stand-up comedian
- Remee − musician, producer, composer, X-factor judge etc.
- Jon Dahl Tomasson − former footballer for the Danish national team
- Kenneth Emil Petersen – footballer who has played for Herfølge BK, AC Horsens and AaB
- Casper Ankergren – footballer, has played for Solrød FC, Køge BK, Brøndby IF, Leeds United and Brighton and Hove Albion
- Simon Sears – actor

== See also ==
- Solrød Strand station

gorm transgaard (Disney comic book book artist with Egmont)
