= Amagerbanen =

Railway in Denmark

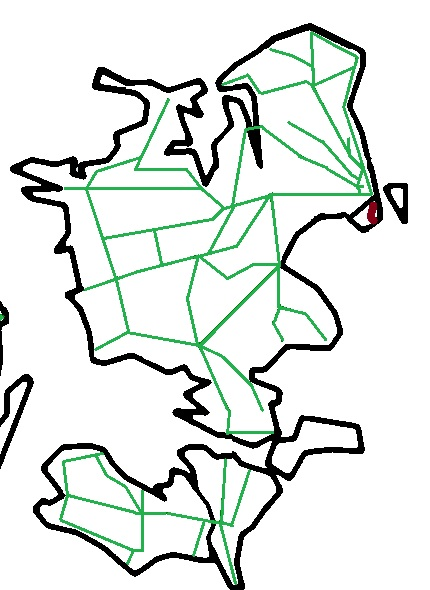
The location of the course in red on Amager.

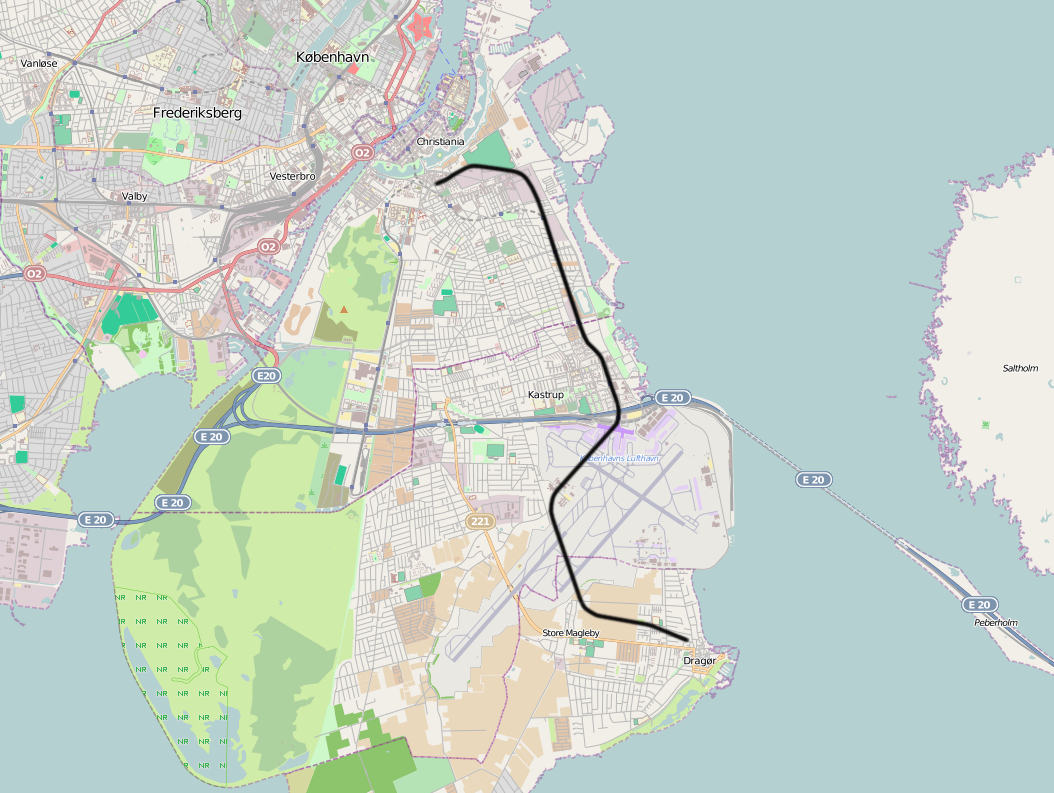
The runway alignment in black on the eastern side of Amager. In 1957 the runway was shortened due to the extension of the runways at Copenhagen Airport.

Amagerbanen was a Danish railroad line from Copenhagen to Dragør on the island Amager, inaugurated on July 10, 1907.

Passenger trains ceased in 1938, but reopened in 1940–47 due to petrol and rubber scarcity during the German occupation. On 15 June 1957 the southern, rural half of the line was closed due to enlargement of Kastrup Airport. The remaining segment from Copenhagen to Kastrup was operated as a freight line until 1991 and officially closed in 1995. The company of Amagerbanen was acquired by the Danish State Railways in 1975.

== Route and traffic ==
The actual Amagerbanen began at Amagerbro station, situated at the inner section of Amagerbrogade, the main street protruding from the centre of Copenhagen. Passenger trains never ran through to Copenhagen Main Station. Passengers needed to transfer by tram.

A link to Copenhagen Freight Station existed by way of tracks belonging to the harbour, crossing on a low double swing bridge next to Langebro. A branch of Amagerbanen went to the petroleum harbour at Prøvestenen.

=== Human waste transport ===
During its first decades of existence, the railway transported "night soil" (human waste) out of Copenhagen to be used as fertiliser for the intensive vegetable cultivation on rural Amager. Latrine buckets were collected during the night and brought by horse carriages to a facility east of Amagerbro station, the waste collection company later known as R98. The facility, colloquially called Lortemøllen (The Shit Mill), transferred the matter through pumps and pipes to railway cars holding three large barrels. The cars were more euphemistically known as chocolate waggons (chokoladevogne). Amager has often been called "the shit island" (lorteøen) by other Copenhageners.

=== Passenger and freight traffic ===
From 1930, Amagerbanen owned all omnibus routes on the island and gradually transferred passenger traffic to buses. Although the northern half of the line developed into a suburban area, the city mainly expanded into the centre of Amager and not along the coast. The southern area was much more sparsely populated. The intense freight traffic to the industrial area along the northern segment caused the railway to be profitable for a long time.

=== Olsen Gang film ===
The railway was used in the 1975 movie The Olsen Gang on the Track. The gang robs an armoured wagon with gold bars and takes it on a detour to Amager with a stolen shunter locomotive. Criminal genius Egon Olsen falsely believes that the railway has been closed since passenger traffic ceased in 1947, and they almost collide with a freight train.

== Remnants today ==
The tracks were mostly present until construction of the metro line M2 from the city centre to Copenhagen Airport, which was built in a trench along much of the same route as the former railroad and completed in 2007. Simultaneously, the former industrial area along the Øresund coast of Amager has been mostly transformed to a residential area along the constructed beach at Amager Strandpark.

A remnant of the link to central Copenhagen exists along the harbour at Islands Brygge, and there is a longer track segment along the streets Uplandsgade (where the multi-track freight yard is situated) and Ved Amagerbanen. The association "Friends of the Amager Railway" (Amagerbanens Venner) operates rail-cycles and draisines on this route. The central inner section, along Svinget, Faste Batteri Vej and Store Mølle Vej has been turned into a gravel bike path. Some sources claim the path is placed between the rails still underneath and therefore 1435 mm (railway gauge) wide.

The present Kastrup metro station is the only one where location and name are identical with the former railway station. The building still stands next to the metro. Øresund metro station is located very close to the former Øresundsvej station which was moved and preserved at the national Open Air Museum north of Copenhagen. The station buildings of Dragør and Store Magleby also still exist. Stations were designed by architect Heinrich Wenck.

Today's Amagerbro metro station is not identical with the former railway terminus, but placed about 500 m south of it.

Although the metro terminus Lufthavnen ("The Airport") has the same name, the former railway halt Lufthavnen had another location. South of Kastrup, the route was bending westwards and the halt was situated at a road rather far from the original airport terminal. The location is now inside the airport, on the apron between the ends of the A and B piers.

== Stations ==
- Amagerbro
- Øresundsvej (close to the Øresund metro station)
- Engvej
- Syrevej (close to the Femøren metro station)
- Kastrup (close to the Kastrup metro station)
- Lufthavnen (Copenhagen Airport), close to the airport terminal
- Tømmerup
- Store Magleby
- Dragør
