= Lergravsparken station =

Copenhagen metro station

Lergravsparken
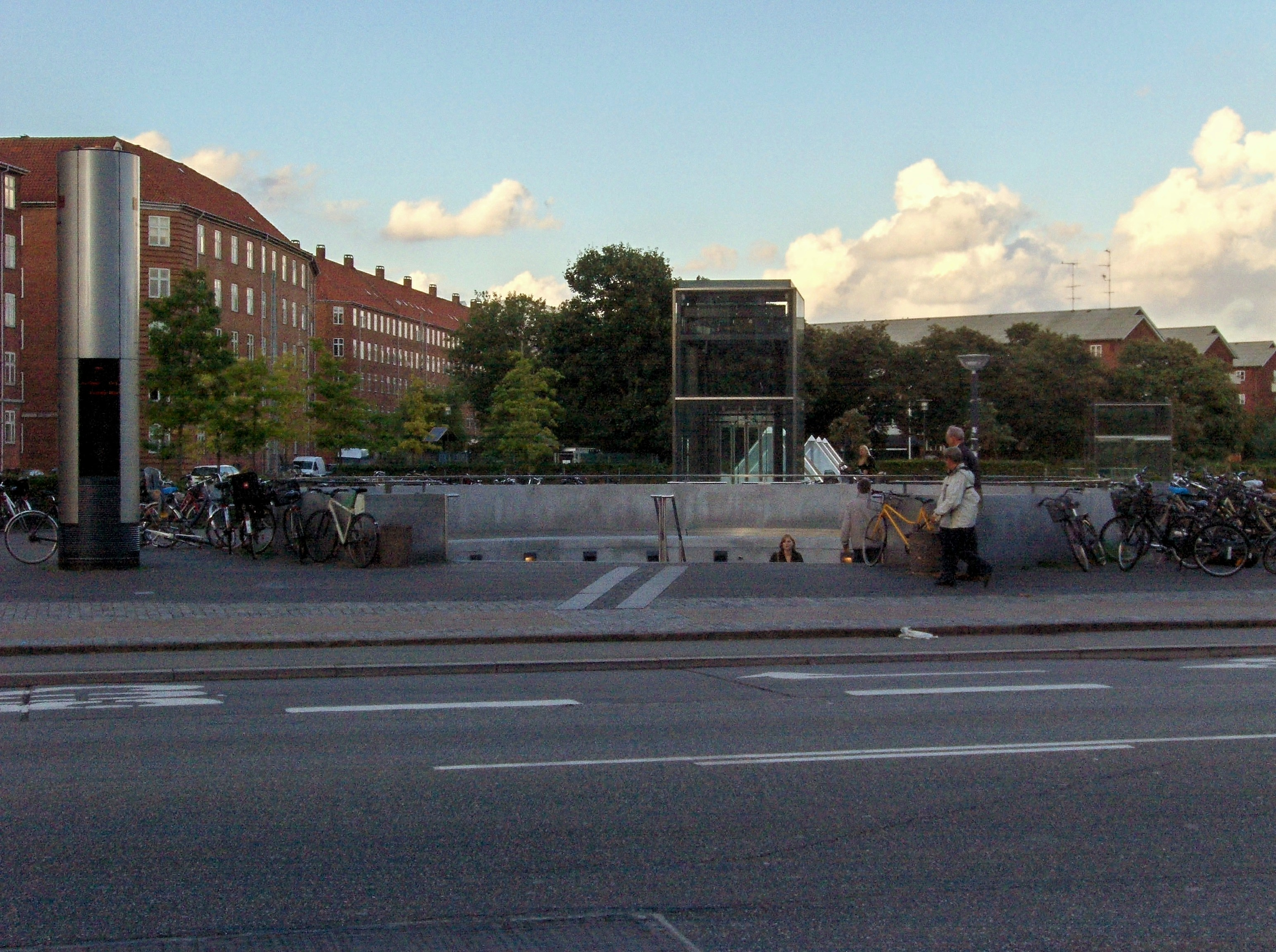

General information
- Location: Østrigsgade 61, 2300 Copenhagen S Copenhagen Municipality
- Coordinates: 55°39′44″N 12°37′1″E
- System: Copenhagen Metro Station
- Owner: Metroselskabet
- Operator: Metro Service A/S
- Platforms: 1 island platform
- Tracks: 2
- Bus routes: 18, 31, 77

Construction
- Structure type: Underground
- Cycle facilities: Yes
- Accessible: Yes

Other information
- Station code: Lgp
- Fare zone: 1

History
- Opened: 19 October 2002; 24 years ago

Services
Preceding station	Copenhagen Metro	Following station
Amagerbro towards Vanløse	M2	Øresund towards Lufthavnen
Location
- Location within Copenhagen Location within Greater Copenhagen Location within Denmark

Lergravsparken station is a deep-level Copenhagen Metro station in the East Amager district of Copenhagen, Denmark. It is located on Øresundsvej in a corner of the public park Lergravsparken from which it takes its name. It opened in 2002.

== History ==
Servicing the M2 line, it was the eastern terminus until the extension of the line to Copenhagen Airport was finished in late 2007. It is located in fare zone 1.

== Design ==
The station has bicycle parking facilities.
