= Super bikeways in metropolitan Copenhagen =

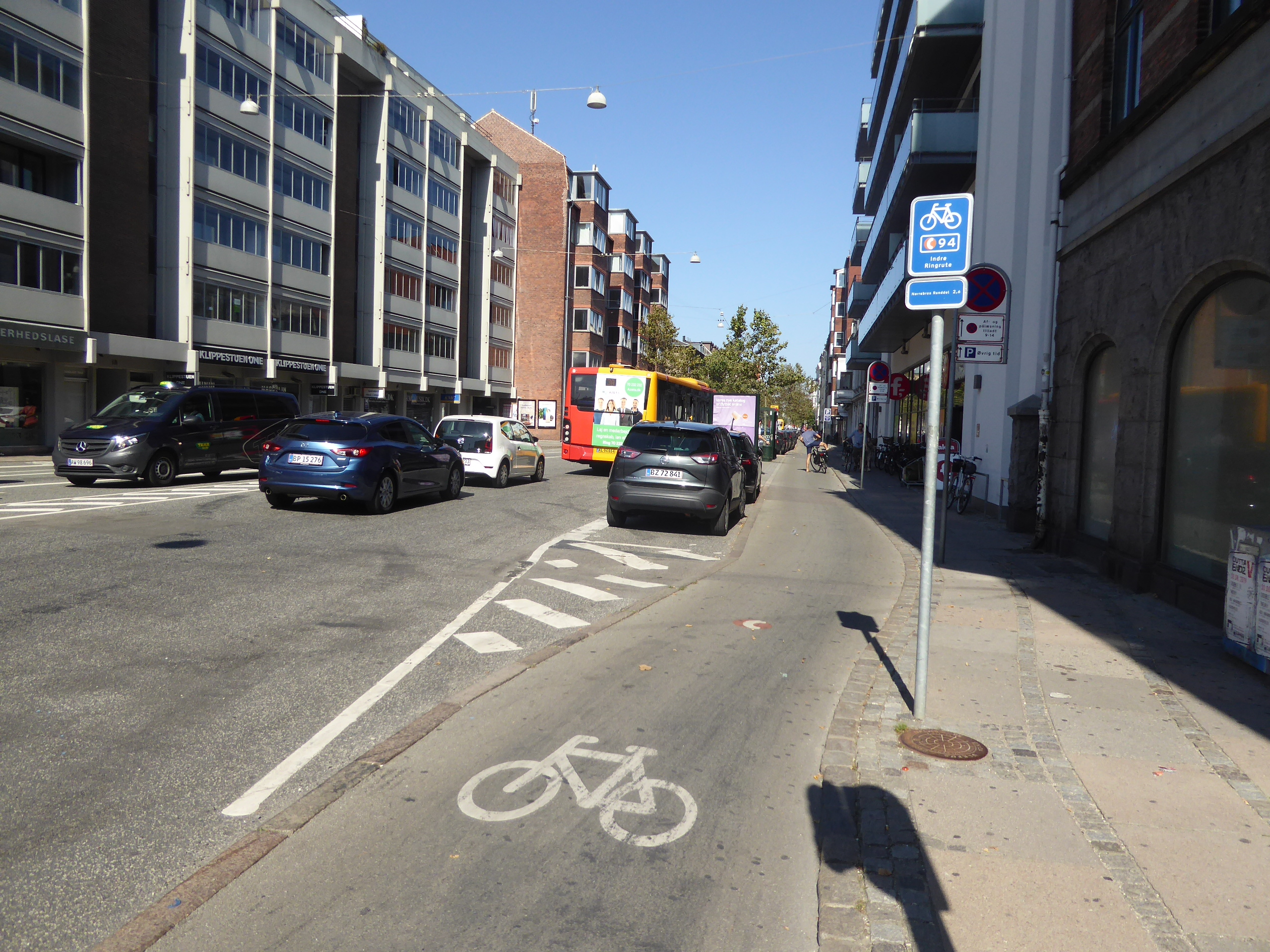
C94 Inner Ring Route at H. C. Ørsteds Vej.

Super Bikeways in metropolitan Copenhagen are a network of high quality bikeways under development to promote commuting by bicycle in metropolitan Copenhagen, Denmark. A collaboration between Copenhagen Municipality and 18 surrounding municipalities in Greater Copenhagen, the objective is to facilitate and increase commuting by bicycle.

When finished, the network will consist of 26 routes and 300 km of bikeways. The first route, from Albertslund to Copenhagen, was inaugurated on 14 April 2012.

== Super bikeways completed 2016–2018 ==
Name	Length	Route	Stations	Completion	Ref
C76 Jyllinge Route	7.0 km	Stenløse station, Krogholmvej, Skatskærvej, Skrædderbakken, Værebrovej, Møllevej		2018	Ref
C77 Ishøj Route	13.8 km	Vigerslev Allé (Carlsberg station), Toftegårds Plads, Gammel Køge Landevej (Åmarken station, Friheden station, Ishøj Strandvej, Ishøj station		August 2016	Ref
C82 Værløse Route	7.3 km	Ring 4 /Ring 4 Route), Nordbuen, greenway, Skotteparken, Skovvej, Ballerupvej, Værløse station, Fiskebækvej, Frederiksborgvej (Farum Route)		2017	Ref
C84 Ring 4 Route	20.8 km	Engelsborgvej, Bagsværdvej, Ring 4, Gl. Rådhusvej, Hold-An Vej, Ballerupvej, Ballerupstien, Rovej, -stien, Trippendalstien, Trippendalsvej, Damgårdsstien, Albertslund station		August 2016	Ref
C91 Helsingør Route (first phase)	11.7 km	Svanemøllen station, Ryvangs Allé (Hellerup station), Gersonsvej, Tranegårdsvej, (Bernstorffsvej station), Høeghsmindevej, Smakkegårdsvej, Jægersborg station, Jægersborgvej, Lundtoftegårdsvej, Nymøllevej, Ravnsholt Skov		2017	Ref
C93 Allerød Route	28.6 km			2017	Ref
C94 Inner Ring Route	13.6 km	Vejlands Allé, Sjællandsbroen, Sydhavnsbroen, Sydhavnsgade, Enghavevej, Kingogade, Alhambravej, H. C. Ørsteds Vej, Thorvaldsensvej. Hans Egedes Vej, Jagtvej, Strandboulevarden	Vesterport station	2017	Ref
C95 Farum Route	20.8 km	Hareskovvej, Hillerød Motorway, Frederiksborgvej	Vesterport station	2013	Ref
C97 Frederikssund Route	37.0 km	Frederikssundsvej, Herlev Hovedgade, Skovlunde Byvej, Ballerup Byvej, Måløv Byvej, Nåløv Værkstedsby, Kongebakken, Kildedalsvej, Frederikssundsvej, Lærkebækvej, Hovevej, Hovedvej, Veksø Stationsvej, Maglehøj Allé, Ededalsvek, Baneringen, Stenløse station, Ring Std, Dronning Dagmars Vej, Banestien, Sperrestrupvej, Stationsvej, Skenkelsø Sø, Strandvangen, Marbækvej, A C Hansensvej, Baneledet, Frederikssund station	2017	Ref	
C98 Copenhagen Route	11.6 km	Svanemøllen station, Østerbrogade, Øster Farimagsgade, Nørre Farimagsgade, H. C. Andersens Boulevard, Langebro, Amager Boulevard, Ved Stadsgraven, Christmas Møllers Plads, Vermlandsgade, Uplandsgade, Prags Boulevard, Ved Amagerbanen, Øresund Station, Krimsvej, Tovelillevej, Amager Strand Station, Tovelillevej, Ved Kastrupfortet, Helgolandsvej, Femøren Station		2018	Ref
C99 Albertslund Route	16.9 km	Kampmannsgade, Danasvej, Thorvaldsensvej, Falkonervænget, Solbjergsvej, Finsensvej, Linde Allé, Hyltebjerg Allé, Elvergårdsvej, Rødovre Parkvej, ???, Nordre Ringvej, Fabriksparken, Poppelstien, Trippendalsvej, Trippendalstien, Galkebakken Øster, Trippendalstien, Stadionstien		2012	Ref

=== Planned routes ===
The routes planned are as follows (further details and maps can be found here):

- Albertslund Route (17.5 km) — Albertslund, Glostrup, Rødovre, Frederiksberg and Copenhagen Municipalities
- Amagerbrogade Route (4.5 km) — Tårnby and Copenhagen Municipalities.
- Ballerup Route (11.1 km) — Ballerup Herlev and Copenhagen Municipalities
- Birkerød Route (19.8 km) — Rudersdal, Lyngby-Taarbæk, Gentofte and Copenhagen Municipalities. Possible extension to Allerød Municipality.
- Damhus Route (12.5 km) — Frederiksberg and Copenhagen Municipalities.
- Dragør East Route (13.3 km) — Dragør, Tårnby and Copenhagen Municipalities.
- Dragør West Route (11.2 km) — Dragør, Tårnby and Copenhagen Municipalities.
- Farum Route (20.9 km) — Furesø, Gladsaxe and Copenhagen Municipalities.
- Fasanvej Route (12.4 km) — Frederiksberg and Copenhagen Municipalities
- Gammel Holte Route (18.8 km) — Rudersdal, Lyngby-Taarbæk, Gentofte and Copenhagen Municipalities. Possible extension to Hørsholm Municipality.
- Harbour Route (4 km) — Temporary proposal, inner city
- Lake Route (7 km) — Temporary proposal, inner city.
- Rampart Route (5 km) — Temporary proposal inner city.
- Inner Ring Route (14.5 km) — Frederiksberg and Copenhagen Municipalities.
- Ishøj Route (12.3 km) — Ishøj, Vallensbæk, Brøndby, Hvidovre and Copenhagen Municipalities.
- Park Allé Route (12.5 km) — Vallensbæk, Brøndby, Hvidovre and Copenhagen Municipalities.
- Ring 3 Route (21 km) — Lyngby-Taarbæk, Gladsaxe, Herlev, Glostrup, Brøndby and Vallensbæk Municipalities.
- Ring 4 Route (10.7 km) — Lyngby-Taarbæk, Gladsaxe, Furesø, Gerlev, Ballerup and Albertslund Municipalities.
- Roskildevej Route (15.8 km) — Albertslund, Brøndby, Glostrup, Hvidovre, Frederiksberg and Copenhagen.
- Vandlednings Route (2.9 km) — Gladsaxe and Copenhagen Municipalities.
- Vestamager Route (7.8 km) — Tårnby and Copenhagen Municipalities.
- Vestbane Route (15.7 km) — Albertslund, Brøndby, Glostrup, Hvidovre and Copenhagen Municipalities.
- Vestvold Route (14 km) — Hvidovre, Brøndby, Rødovre and Copenhagen Municipalities.
- Vestvold East Route (11.1 km) — Hvidovre, Copenhagen and Tårnby Municipalities.
- Ørestad Route (7.8 km) — Tårnby and Copenhagen Municipalities.
- Øresund Route (22.3 km) — Rudersdal, Lyngby-Taarbæk, Gentofte and Copenhagen Municipalities.
