= Christianshavn station =

Copenhagen metro station

Christianshavn
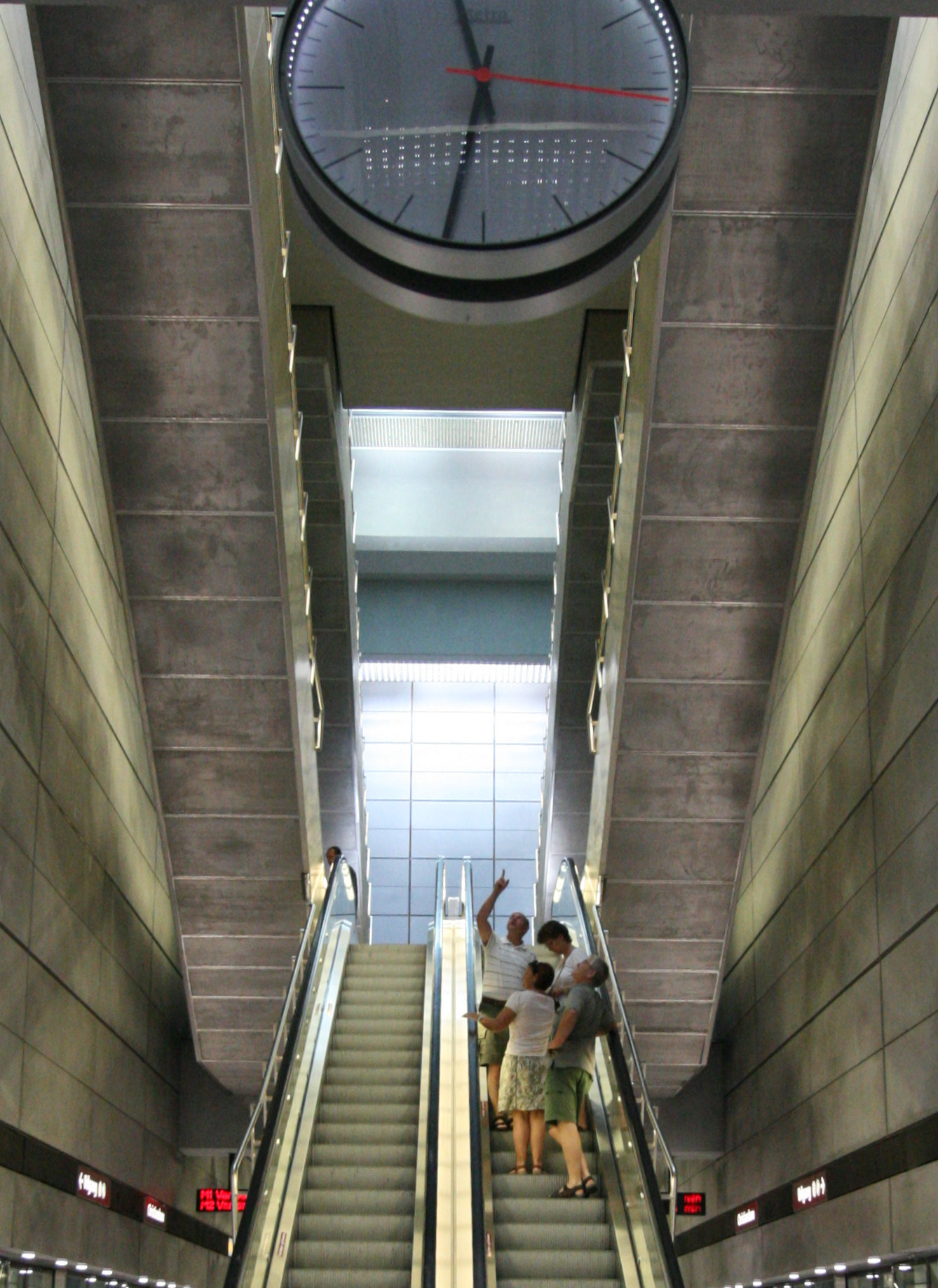

General information
- Location: Torvegade 44, 1400 Copenhagen K Copenhagen Municipality; Denmark
- Coordinates: 55°40′20″N 12°35′28.4″E
- System: Copenhagen Metro Station
- Owner: Metroselskabet
- Platforms: 1 island platform
- Tracks: 2
- Connections: 31, 37, 2A

Construction
- Structure type: Underground
- Accessible: Yes

Other information
- Station code: Khc
- Fare zone: 1

History
- Opened: 19 October 2002; 24 years ago

Services
Preceding station	Copenhagen Metro	Following station
Kongens Nytorv towards Vanløse	M1	Islands Brygge towards Vestamager
Kongens Nytorv towards Vanløse	M2	Amagerbro towards Lufthavnen
Location
- Location within Copenhagen Location within Greater Copenhagen Location within Denmark

Christianshavn station is a rapid transit station on the Copenhagen Metro, served by the M1 and M2 lines. The station is located centrally in the Christianshavn district. It is located in fare zone 1 and opened in 2002. It is notable for having a different layout than other underground stations on the line. The platforms are much narrower, and the "diamonds" seen on street level are not present on this station.

The station has bicycle parking facilities.
