= Amager Strandpark =

Seaside park in Copenhagen

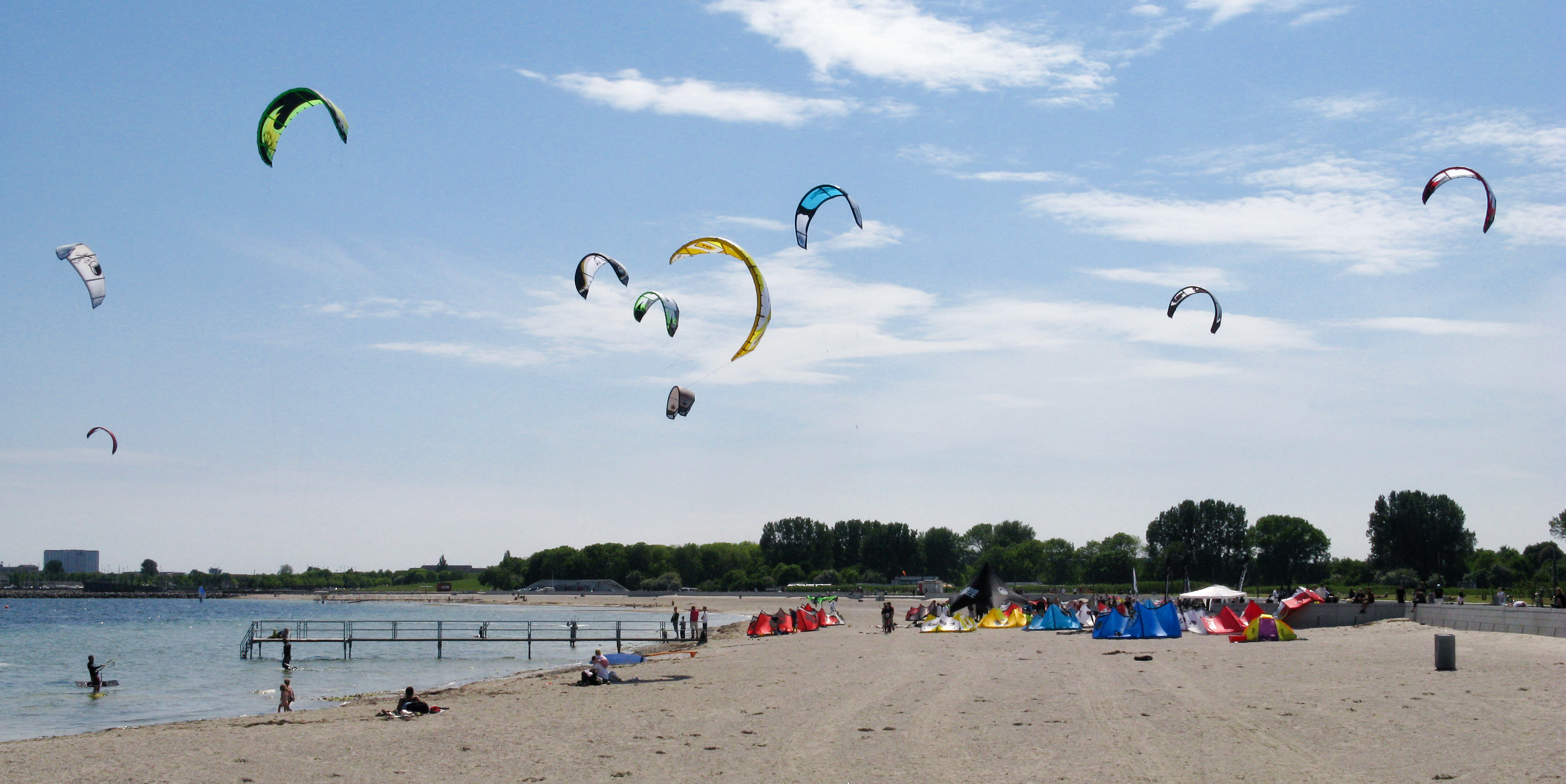
- Kitesurfers at Amager Strandpark

- Location within Denmark
- Interactive map of Amager Strandpark
- Type: Public
- Location: Amager East, Copenhagen
- Coordinates: 55°39′14″N 12°38′51″E
- Area: 60 hectares 4.5 km beach
- Created: 1934/2005
- Parking: 1 lot at the southern end

Amager Strandpark (Amager Beach Park) is a seaside public park in Copenhagen, Denmark. It is located on the island of Amager and includes an artificial island and offers a total of 4.6 km (2.9 mi) of beaches. From the beach, the Middelgrunden wind farm can be seen on the horizon.

The park was founded in 1934 and in 2005 a 2 km-long (1.2 mi) artificial island was added. The island is separated from the original beach by a lagoon which is crossed by three bridges. The beach has two sections. The northern section has a natural beach environment with winding paths, broad sandy beaches and low dunes. The southern section offers a so-called city beach with a broad promenade and areas for ball play or picnicking. There is also a small marina and parking facilities at the southern end. The lagoon has low-water areas for children as well as a 1,000 m (3,300 ft) swimming course.

== Activities ==
The area is used for runners, swimmers and kayakers, windsurfers, among many others. There is a space for outdoor fitness training and from a small headland, it is possible to go diving. A grassy area at the southern end of the park, known as Femøren (which translates to "the 5 øre coin"), is often used for open-air rock concerts in summer. It is also a popular spot for skateboarders. American pro skater Torey Pudwill has a picture-ad, where he kick-flips down double set stairs at Bunker 2.

There is a large kayak club at the southern end of the artificial island with a cafe, rentals, and a sporting goods store. There are also sauna facilities and other amenities available near the kayak club area.

Close to a parking lot, there's a windsurfing and kitesurfing club and a windsurfing school.

== Water conditions ==
Øresund is a shallow strait which allows rather fast temperature rises, when air temperatures permits. Possible bathing season is between mid-May and mid-September. However, to reach fairly good bathing temperatures (of at least 18 °C (64.4 °F) or higher) in the afternoons, air temperature needs to be above 25 °C (77 °F) for about a week in May, while just a few days of heat is enough in August. During longer heat waves, water temperatures often rise above 22 °C (71.6 F) during the period of late June until early September.

The water quality is usually very good. All local outlets to Øresund has been thoroughly cleaned and disinfected since the 1970s (this applies to the Swedish part of Øresund as well). Water salinity is highly dependent on the current. With northbound current (from the Baltic Sea) salinity may drop down a bit below 10 PSU (1.0% by weight), but with southbound current (from Kattegat) salinity rises to above 25 PSU, not so far from the North Sea salinity of 30–33 PSU. Eastbound and westbound currents cannot occur in Øresund, with very local exceptions only. The daily tides are not notable, but irregular, weather-dependent water level differences do exist. During winter, ice problems are very rare.

== Transport ==
The park is served by three metro stations: Øresund station to the north, Femøren station to the south, and Amager Strand station roughly in the middle. All stations are on the M2 line of the Copenhagen Metro. It is also easily reached on bicycle in about 15 minutes from the city centre.

== Cultural references ==
Sonja (Anika Person) frequents Helgoland Bath at 0:32:50 in the 1972 Olsen-banden film The Olsen Gang's Big Score.

== See also ==
- Parks and open spaces in Copenhagen
- Copenhagen Harbour Baths
- Bellevue Beach
