= Lindevang station =

Copenhagen metro station

Lindevang
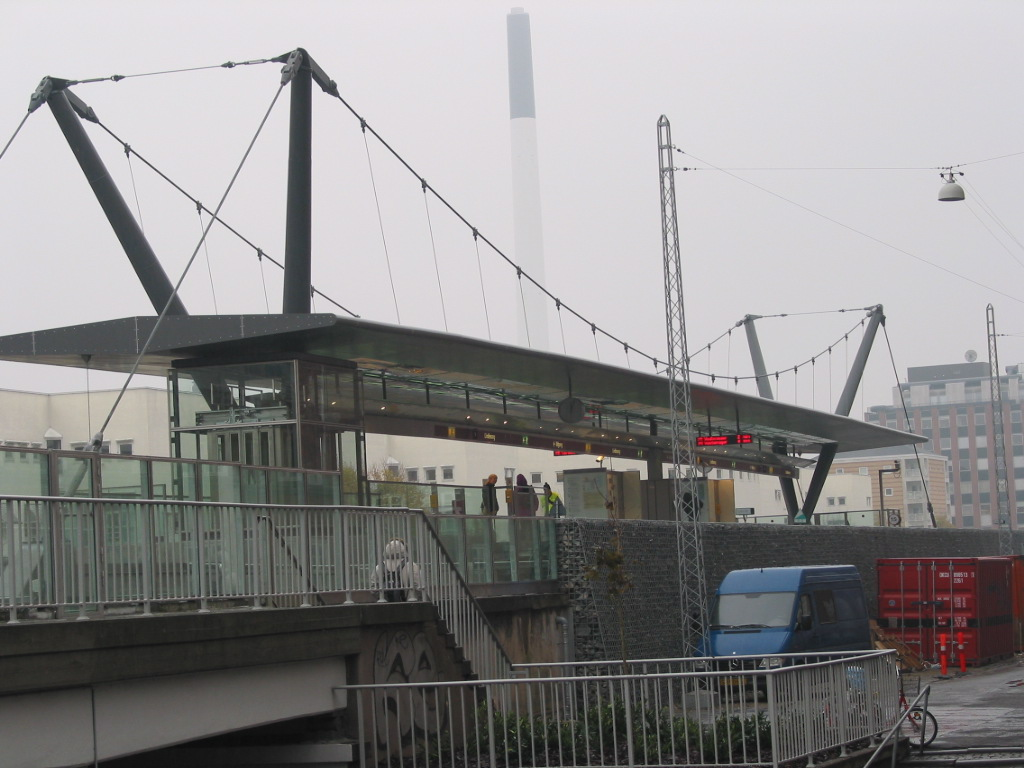

General information
- Location: 142 Dalgas Boulevard; 2000 Frederiksberg; Denmark
- Coordinates: 55°41′0.5″N 12°30′47.2″E
- System: Copenhagen Metro Station
- Owner: Metroselskabet
- Operator: Metro Service A/S
- Platforms: 1 island platform
- Tracks: 2
- Bus routes: 37

Construction
- Structure type: Elevated
- Accessible: Yes

Other information
- Station code: Lit
- Fare zone: 2

History
- Opened: 13 December 1986 (S-train); 12 October 2003 (Metro)

Passengers
- 2018: 4,000 daily

Services
Preceding station	Copenhagen Metro	Following station
Flintholm towards Vanløse	M1	Fasanvej towards Vestamager
Flintholm towards Vanløse	M2	Fasanvej towards Lufthavnen
Location
- Location within Copenhagen Location within Greater Copenhagen Location within Denmark

Lindevang station is a rapid transit station on the Copenhagen Metro in Frederiksberg, Denmark. It serves the M1 and M2 lines. It is located where the Metro line crosses Dalgas Boulevard in Frederiksberg. It opened 12 October 2003. It is located in fare zone 2.

== History ==
Lindevang station operated from 13 December 1986 to 1 January 2000 as a stop on the Copenhagen S-train line between Vanløse and Frederiksberg. The line was subsequently converted to a part of the Metro network.

== Cultural references ==
Lindevang St. is a 2014 song by Mouritz/Hørslev Projektet
