= Fasanvej station =

Copenhagen metro station

Fasanvej
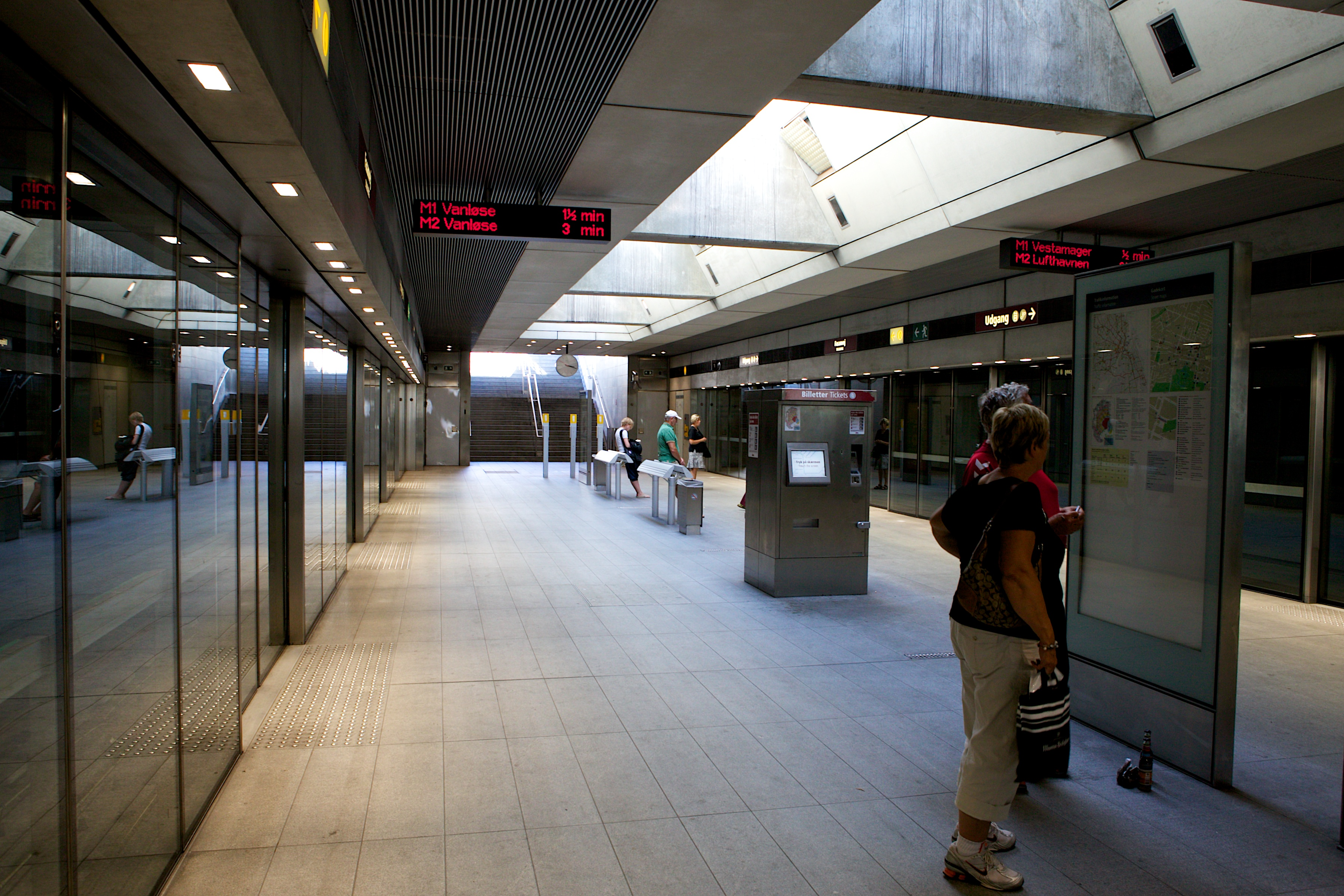

General information
- Location: 26D Nordre Fasanvej, 2000 Frederiksberg; Frederiksberg Municipality; Denmark
- Coordinates: 55°40′54″N 12°31′24″E
- System: Copenhagen Metro Station
- Owner: Metroselskabet
- Operator: Metro Service A/S
- Platforms: 1 island platform
- Tracks: 2
- Bus routes: 37, 74, 4A

Construction
- Structure type: Underground
- Accessible: Yes

Other information
- Station code: Sot

History
- Opened: 13 December 1986 (S-train); 12 October 2003 (Metro)
- Closed: 1 January 2000 (S-train)

Passengers
- 2018: 7,000 per weekday

Services
Preceding station	Copenhagen Metro	Following station
Lindevang towards Vanløse	M1	Frederiksberg towards Vestamager
Lindevang towards Vanløse	M2	Frederiksberg towards Lufthavnen
Location
- Location within Copenhagen Location within Greater Copenhagen Location within Denmark

Fasanvej station is a rapid transit station on the Copenhagen Metro in Frederiksberg, Denmark. It was known as Solbjerg Station until 25 September 2006. The station opened 12 October 2003, and serves the M1 and M2 lines. It is located in fare zone 2.

== History ==
The former Solbjerg Station functioned between 13 December 1986 and 1 January 2000 as a stop on the Copenhagen S-train track between Vanløse station and Frederiksberg station. Following the closure of Frederiksberg station on 20 June 1998, Solbjerg became the line terminus until this line stopped operations as part of the S-train network and the line converted to a part of the Metro network. The former S-train station was located above ground on the western side of Søndre Fasanvej. The Metro station is located below ground on the eastern side of the street.
