= Amager Strand station =

Copenhagen metro station

Amager Strand
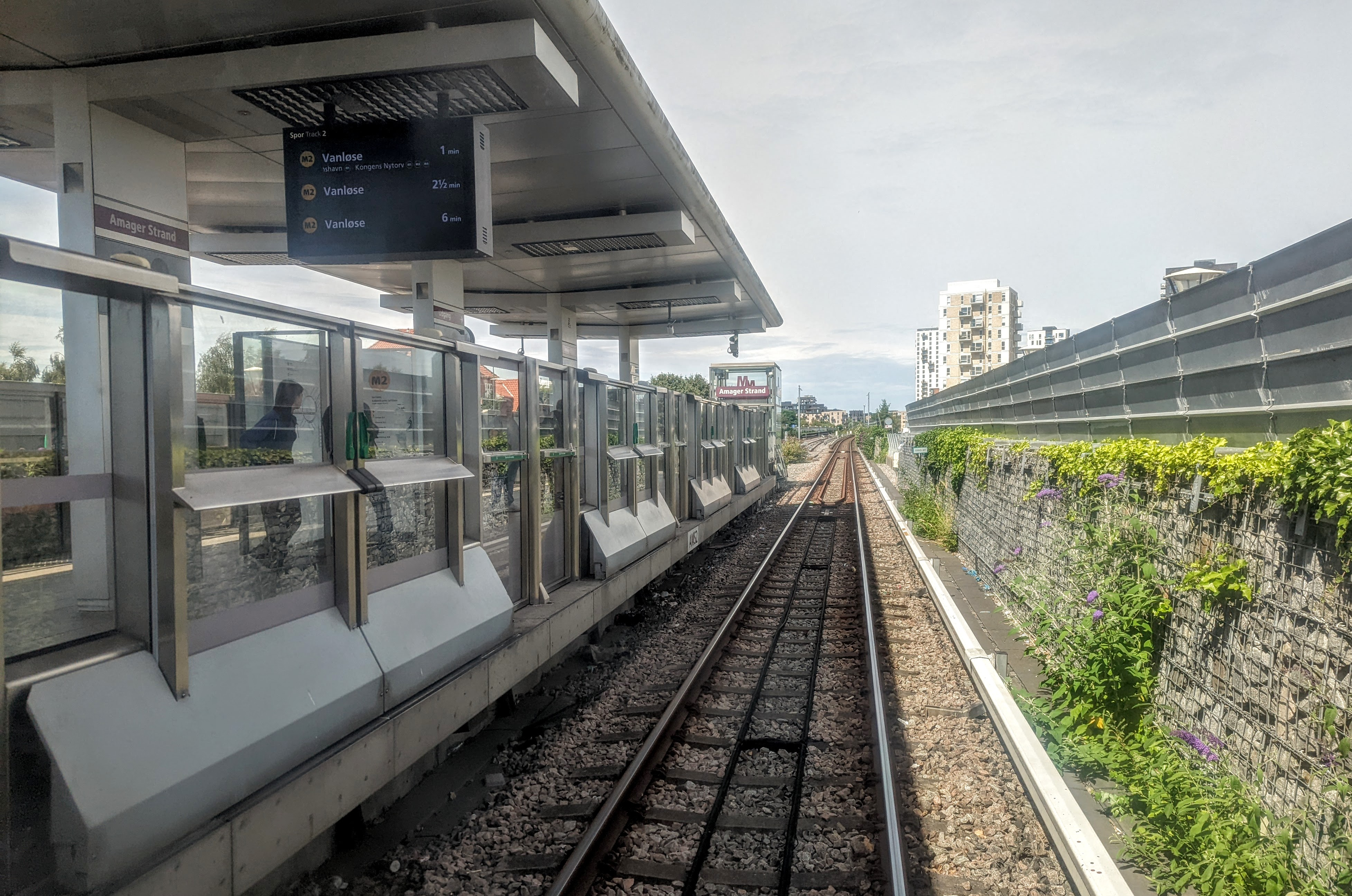

General information
- Location: Italiensvej 72A, 2300 Copenhagen S Copenhagen Municipality
- Coordinates: 55°39′22″N 12°37′54″E
- System: Copenhagen Metro station
- Owner: Metroselskabet
- Platforms: 1 island platform
- Tracks: 2
- Bus routes: 77

Construction
- Structure type: At grade
- Accessible: Yes

Other information
- Station code: Ams
- Fare zone: 3

History
- Opened: 28 September 2007; 18 years ago

Passengers
- 1000

Services
Preceding station	Copenhagen Metro	Following station
Øresund towards Vanløse	M2	Femøren towards Lufthavnen
Location
- Location within Copenhagen Location within Greater Copenhagen Location within Denmark

Amager Strand station is a rapid transit station on the Copenhagen Metro, located in the Sundbyøster district of Copenhagen. It opened on 28 September 2007. It is named after the nearby beach at Amager Strandpark.

The station serves the M2 line, in fare zone 3.
