= Flintholm railway station =

Commuter and rapid transit railway station in Copenhagen, Denmark

Flintholm
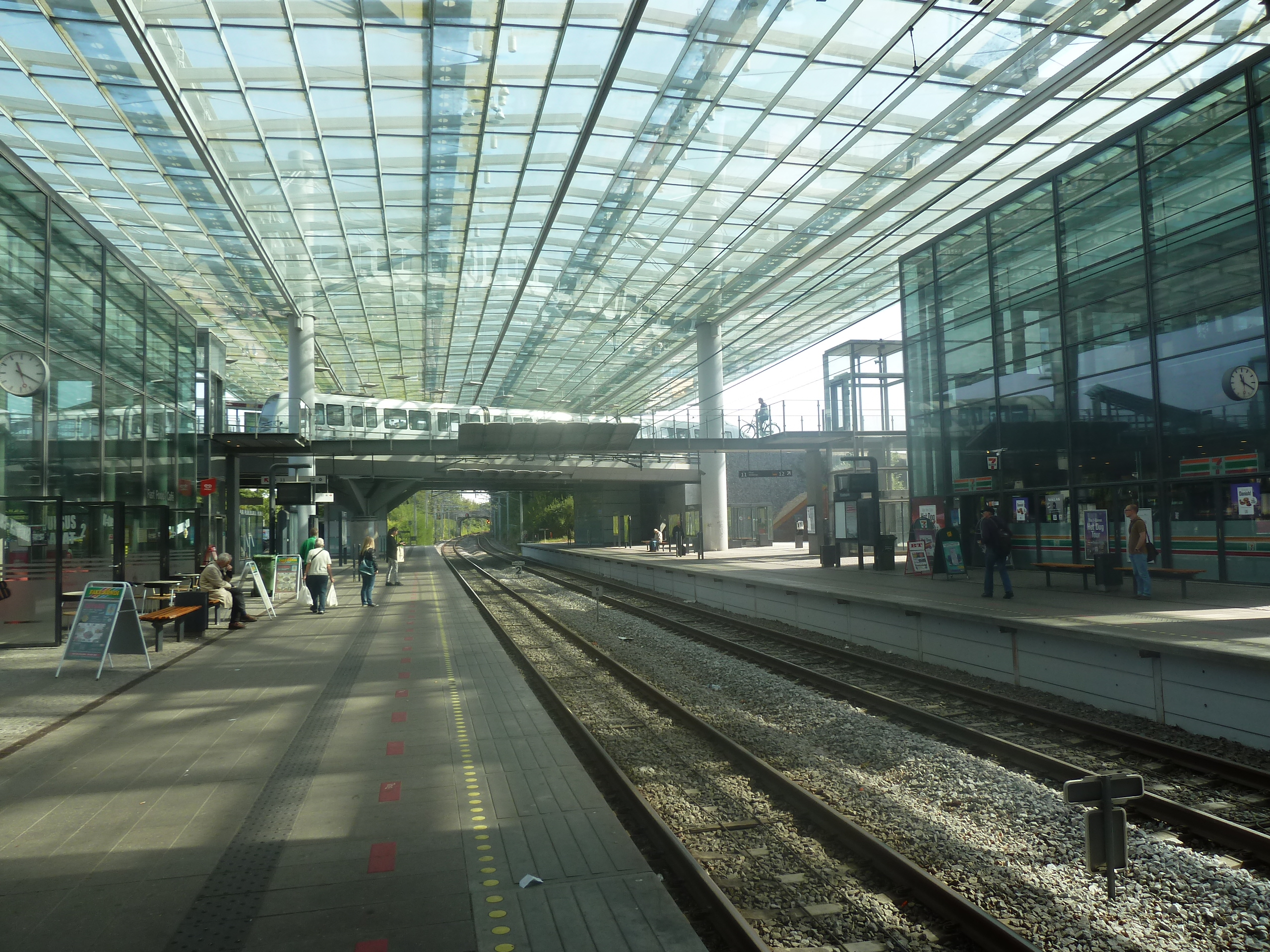
- Flintholm station in 2012

General information
- Location: Flintholm Allé 55; 2000 Frederiksberg; Frederiksberg Municipality; Denmark
- Coordinates: 55°41′9″N 12°29′58″E
- Elevation: 12.0 metres (39.4 ft)
- System: S-train and Copenhagen Metro
- Owner: DSB (station infrastructure); Banedanmark (rail infrastructure)
- Operator: DSB, Metro Service A/S
- Platforms: 1 island platform, 2 side platforms (S-train); 1 island platform (metro)
- Tracks: 4 (S-train); 2 (metro)
- Bus routes: 9A, 10, 21, 26, 37, 142

Construction
- Structure type: Elevated and ground at-grade
- Platform levels: 2
- Accessible: Yes

Other information
- Station code: Fl
- Fare zone: 2

History
- Opened: 24 January 2004; 22 years ago

Services
| Preceding station | S-train | Following station |
|---|---|---|
| Valby towards Klampenborg | C | Vanløse towards Frederikssund |
| Peter Bangs Vej towards Klampenborg | C Sat–Sun | Vanløse towards Frederikssund |
| Peter Bangs Vej towards Østerport | H Mon–Fri | Vanløse towards Ballerup |
| KB Hallen towards Copenhagen South | F | Grøndal towards Hellerup |
| Preceding station | Copenhagen Metro | Following station |
| Vanløse Terminus | M1 | Lindevang towards Vestamager |
| Vanløse Terminus | M2 | Lindevang towards Lufthavnen |
Location

Flintholm station is an S-train and Metro interchange junction station in Copenhagen, Denmark. It opened on 24 January 2004, and it is located in the west of Copenhagen where the Frederikssund S-train Line crosses the S-train Ring Line. It is located in fare zone 2.

The station has two levels. On the lower level the Ring Line runs roughly north–south with side platforms (tracks 11 and 12). On the upper level, tracks on Frederikssund Line and the Metro run on bridge constructions with a center platform for each above the ring line tracks. The bridges continue west of the station, above a bus terminal and the street Grøndals Parkvej towards Vanløse station.

A large monumental glass roof covers all the tracks and the bus terminal. The design of the station has earned it various awards, among others the European Steel Design Awards.

== See also ==
- List of Copenhagen Metro stations
- List of Copenhagen S-train stations
- List of railway stations in Denmark
- Rail transport in Denmark
- Transport in Copenhagen
