= List of Copenhagen Metro stations =

Map of the Copenhagen Metro following the Sydhavn extension of the M4 (2024)

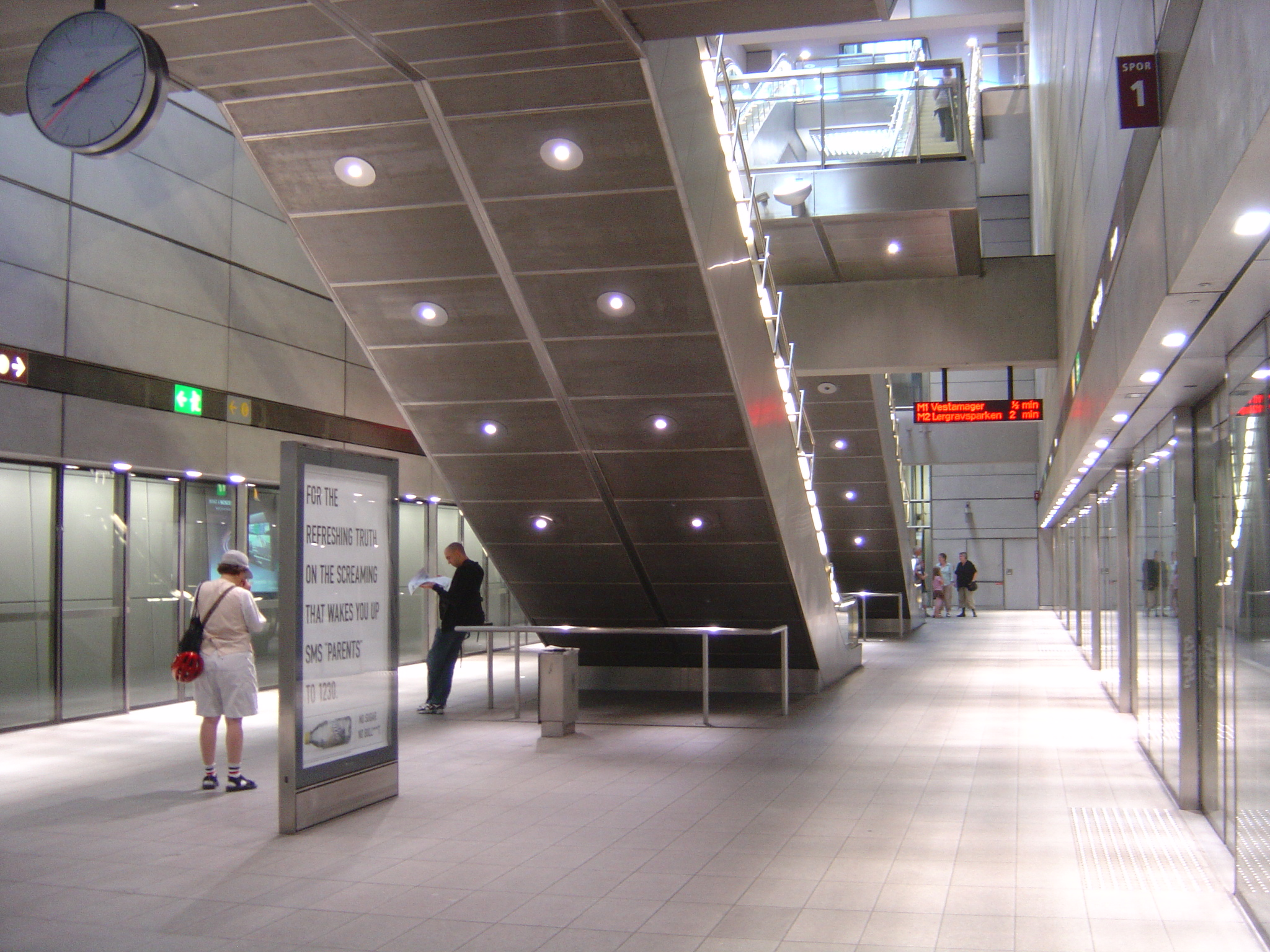
Platform level at Forum Station

There are 44 stations in the Copenhagen Metro, a driverless rapid transit system serving Copenhagen, Frederiksberg and Tårnby in Denmark. Of the original 22 metro stations, nine are underground, twelve are elevated, and one is at street level. Christianshavn Station offers transfer between the system's two original lines (M1 and M2), which share track between Vanløse and Christianshavn stations. From Christianshavn, M1 branches south traveling to Vestamager Station, while M2 heads southeast to Lufthavnen Station, which serves Copenhagen Airport.

The City Circle Line, which opened on 29 September 2019, has 17 stations, with transfer between the current and new lines at Frederiksberg and Kongens Nytorv stations. The new lines have a stop at Copenhagen Central Station (København H), the largest train station in Denmark. On 28 March 2020, the first part of the M4 line opened, adding two additional stations and an increased number of trains on the København H - Østerport part of the City Circle Line. Transfer from the Copenhagen Metro to regional trains is possible at Copenhagen Central Station, Lufthavnen, Nørreport, Ørestad and Østerport stations. Transfers to S-train services are possible at Copenhagen Central Station, Nørreport, Østerport, Nørrebro, Flintholm, Vanløse and Nordhavn stations.

The Copenhagen Metro opened in 2002, with additional stations opening in 2003, and the M2 branch to the airport completed in 2007. M1 and M2 are in total 21 kilometers (13 mi) long, of which 10 kilometers (6.2 mi) is in tunnels and 11 kilometers (6.8 mi) is elevated. It takes 23 minutes to travel on each line from one end to the other. The City Circle Line is intended to form a 15.5-kilometer (9.6 mi) loop around the city center, with a full circumference taking 25 minutes. The M3 line follows the full circle whilst the M4 line only operates along the eastern half. On 22 June 2024, the M4 was extended to Sydhavnen adding five new stations south of København H with a new southern terminus at København S.

The system is owned by Metroselskabet, a company owned jointly by the municipalities of Copenhagen and Frederiksberg, and the government of Denmark. The metro and its 34 trains are operated by the private company Metro Service.

== Key ==
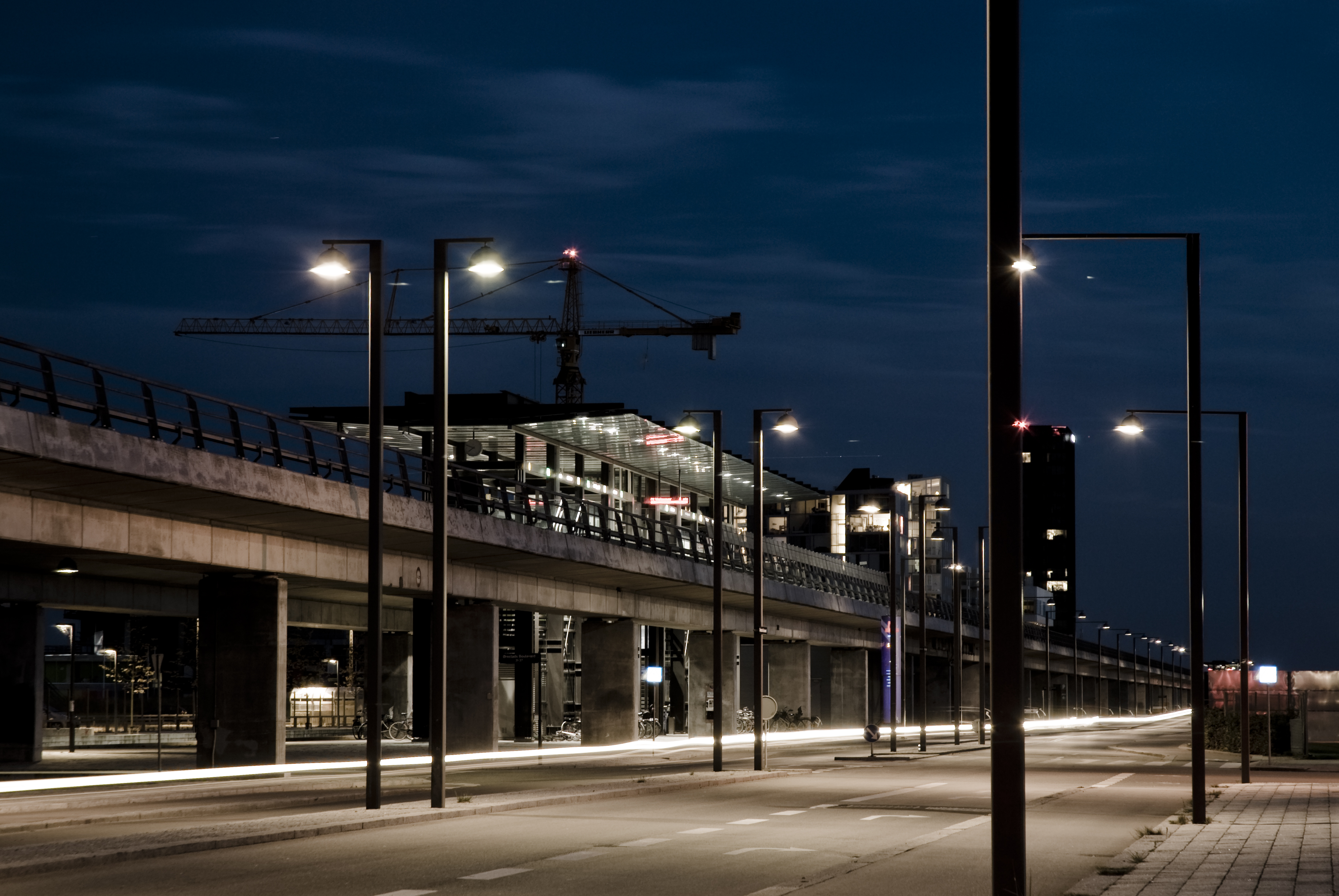
Bella Center Station

The following list name the stations that opened between 2002 and 2024. It states the station's name, which lines serve it, whether it is elevated or underground (the grade), travel time in minutes to Nørreport if the station is located on the M1 or M2, the ticket zone and any transfer possibilities available at the station.

†	Terminal station
#	Transfer station

== List of stations ==
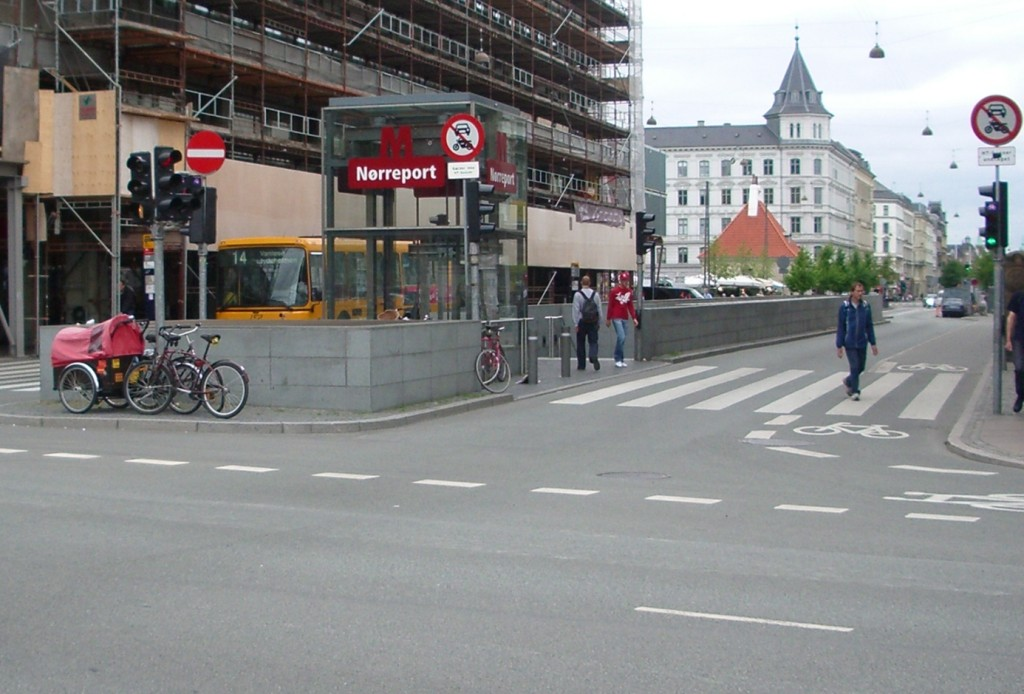
Street-level access to Nørreport Station

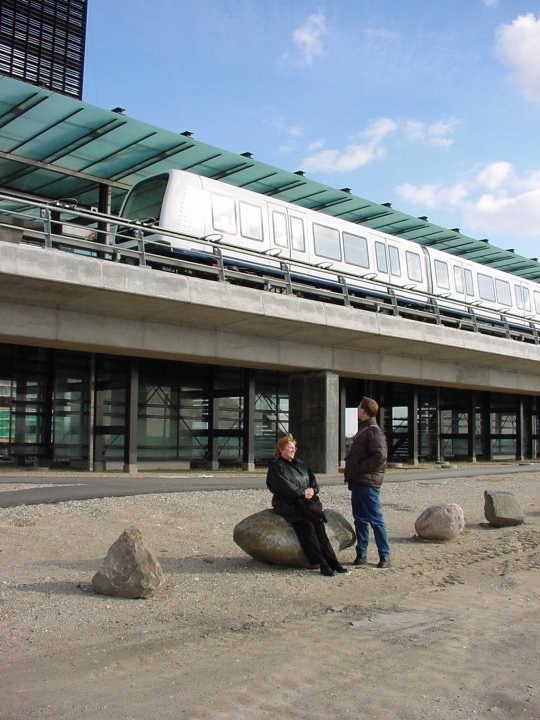
Ørestad Station

Station	Line	Grade	Opened	Time to Nørreport (M1 and M2)	Zone	Transfer
Aksel Møllers Have	M3	Underground	2019	N/A	1	—
Amager Strand	M2	Elevated	2007	10	3	—
Amagerbro	M2	Underground	2002	5	1	—
Bella Center	M1	Elevated	2002	11	3	—
Christianshavn^{#}	M1 M2	Underground	2003	3	1	—
DR Byen	M1	Elevated	2002	7	1, 3	—
Enghave Plads	M3	Underground	2019	N/A	1	—
Enghave Brygge	M4	Underground	2024	N/A	1	—
Fasanvej	M1 M2	Underground	2003	5	2	—
Femøren	M2	Elevated	2007	12	3	—
Flintholm^{#}	M1 M2	Elevated	2004	8	2	S-train
Forum^{#}	M1 M2	Underground	2003	2	1	—
Frederiksberg^{#}	M1 M2 M3	Underground	2003	3	1, 2	—
Frederiksberg Allé	M3	Underground	2019	N/A	1	—
Gammel Strand^{#}	M3 M4	Underground	2019	N/A	1	—
Havneholmen	M4	Underground	2024	N/A	1	—
Islands Brygge	M1	Underground	2002	5	1	—
Kastrup	M2	Elevated	2007	14	4	—
København H^{#}	M3 M4	Underground	2019	N/A	1	Regional trains, InterCity, X 2000, S-train
København S^{†#}	M4	Underground	2024	N/A	2	S-train, regional trains
Kongens Nytorv^{#}	M1 M2 M3 M4	Underground	2002	2	1	—
Lergravsparken	M2	Underground	2002	7	1	—
Lindevang^{#}	M1 M2	Elevated	2003	7	2	—
Lufthavnen^{†#}	M2	Elevated	2007	15	4	Regional trains, X 2000, EuroNight, Copenhagen Airport (air travel)
Marmorkirken^{#}	M3 M4	Underground	2019	N/A	1	—
Mozarts Plads	M4	Underground	2024	N/A	2	—
Nordhavn^{#}	M4	Underground	2020	N/A	2	S-train
Nørrebro^{#}	M3	Underground	2019	N/A	2	S-train
Nørrebros Runddel	M3	Underground	2019	N/A	1	—
Nørreport^{#}	M1 M2	Underground	2002	0	1	Regional trains, S-train
Nuuks Plads	M3	Underground	2019	N/A	1	—
Orientkaj^{†}	M4	Elevated	2020	N/A	1	—
Ørestad^{#}	M1	Elevated	2002	12	3	Regional trains
Øresund	M2	Elevated	2007	9	3	—
Østerport^{#}	M3 M4	Underground	2019	N/A	1	Regional trains, S-train
Poul Henningsens Plads	M3	Underground	2019	N/A	1	—
Rådhuspladsen^{#}	M3 M4	Underground	2019	N/A	1	—
Skjolds Plads	M3	Underground	2019	N/A	1	—
Sluseholmen	M4	Underground	2024	N/A	1	—
Sundby	M1	Elevated	2002	9	3	—
Trianglen	M3	Underground	2019	N/A	1	—
Vanløse^{†#}	M1 M2	Street Level	2003	9	2	S-train
Vestamager^{†}	M1	Elevated	2002	14	3	—
Vibenshus Runddel	M3	Underground	2019	N/A	1	—

^{†} Terminal station. ^{#} Transfer station.

== Future stations ==
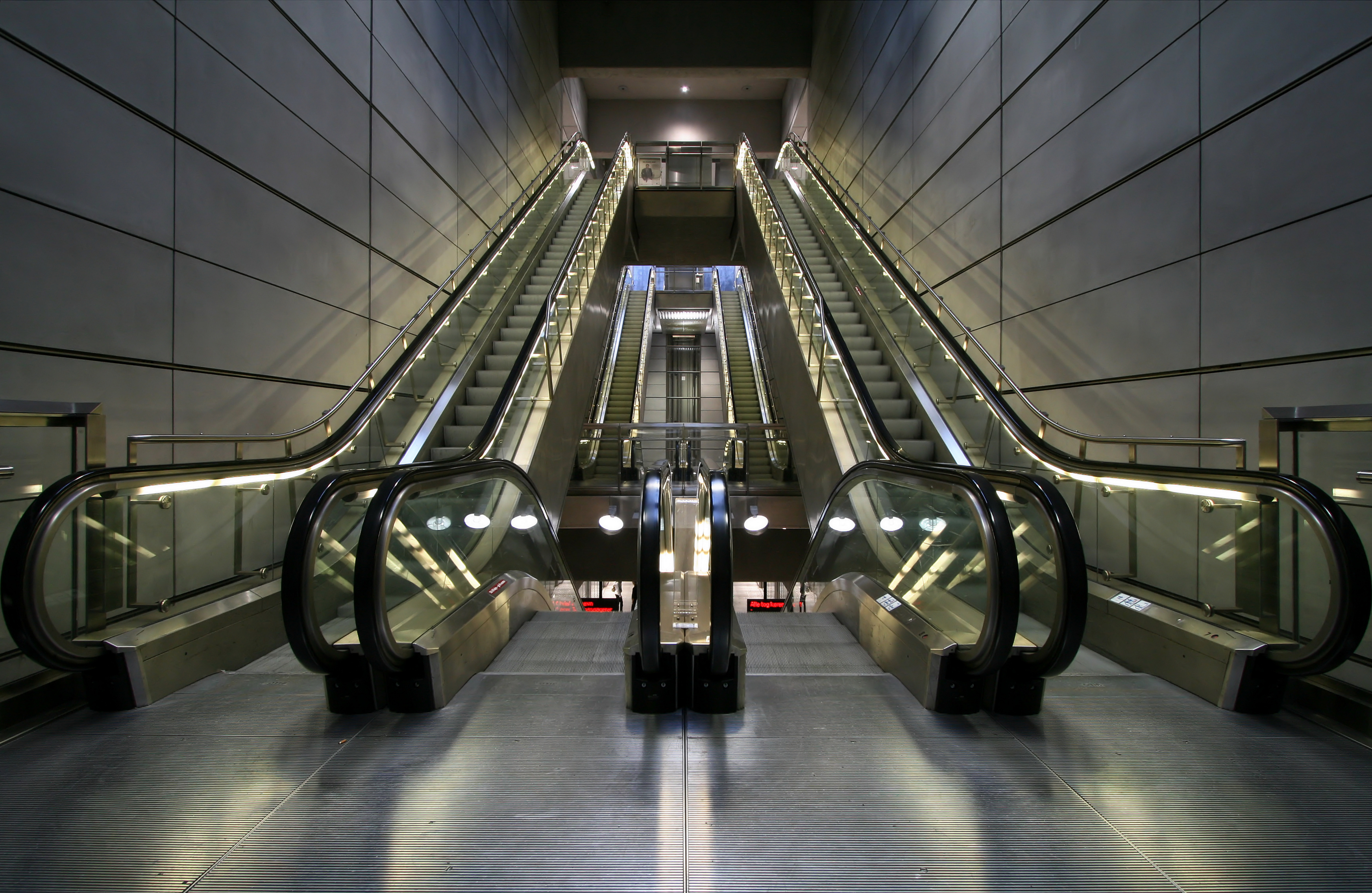
Escalators at the underground Amagerbro Station

The M4 was originally planned to service Trianglen, Poul Henningsens Plads, Vibenshus Runddel and Nørrebro stations on a temporary basis. This plan was later abandoned. Since its opening, the M4 serves the København H - Østerport - Orientkaj route. The City Circle Line opened on 29 September 2019 and two Nordhavn stations opened on 28 March 2020. An extension with five Sydhavn stations (København S - København H) opened on 22 June 2024.

The Nordhavn end of the M4 has 2 stations, while the Sydhavn end will have 5 stations. As the built up areas of Nordhavn expand towards the North-East, no less than 9 versions of a future extension have been examined.
