= Amagerbro station =

Copenhagen metro station

Amagerbro
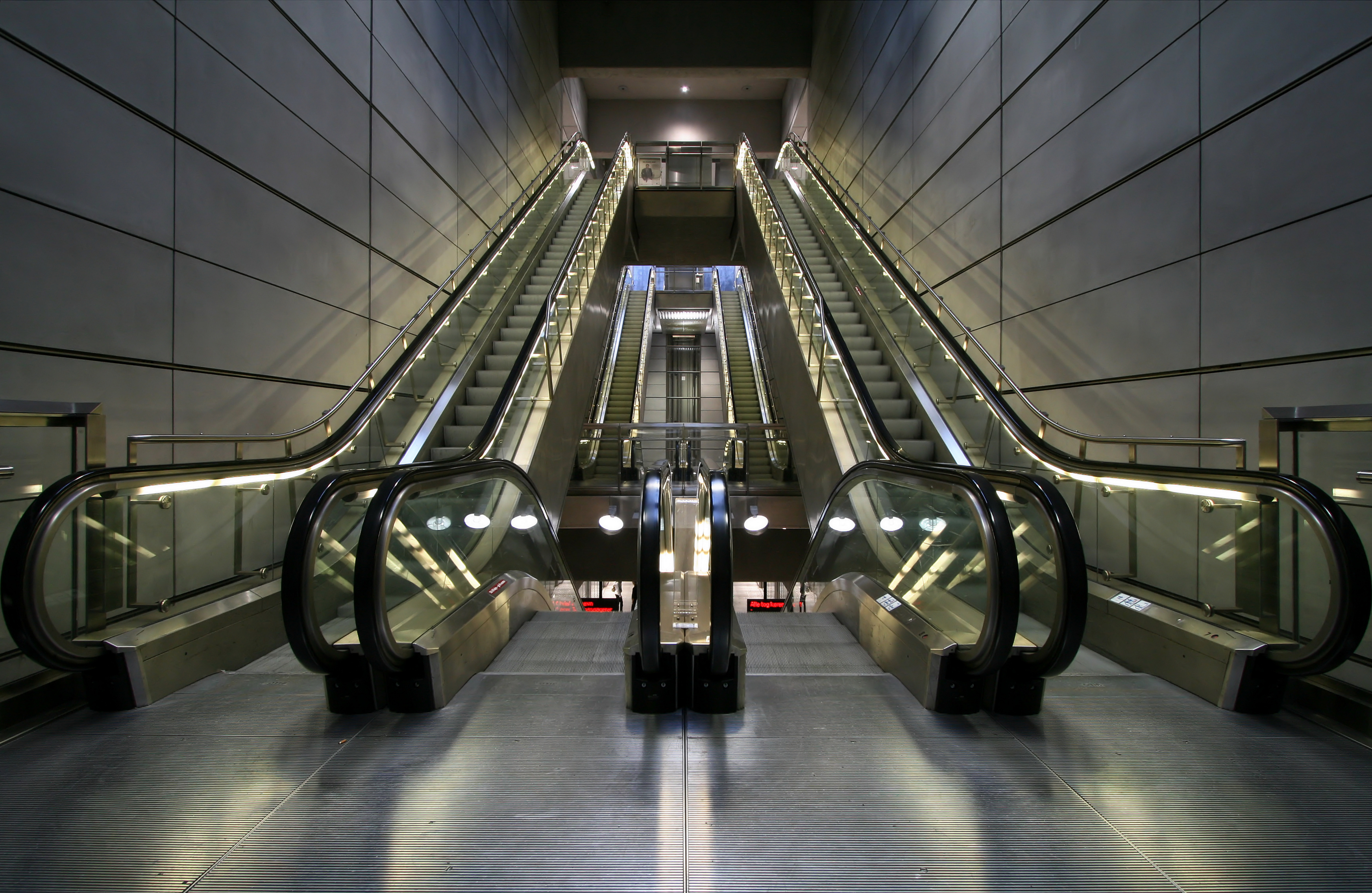

General information
- Location: Amagerbro Torv 1, 2300 Copenhagen S Copenhagen Municipality
- Coordinates: 55°39′48.1″N 12°36′10.6″E
- System: Copenhagen Metro Station
- Owner: Metroselskabet
- Platforms: 1 island platform
- Tracks: 2
- Connections: 31, 5C, 250S

Construction
- Structure type: Underground
- Accessible: Yes

Other information
- Station code: Amb
- Fare zone: 1

History
- Opened: 19 October 2002; 24 years ago

Passengers
- 2018: 10,000 per weekday

Services
Preceding station	Copenhagen Metro	Following station
Christianshavn towards Vanløse	M2	Lergravsparken towards Lufthavnen
Location
- Location within Copenhagen Location within Greater Copenhagen Location within Denmark

Amagerbro station is a rapid transit station on the Copenhagen Metro, located in the Sundbyøster district of Copenhagen. It opened in 2002.

The station serves the M2 line and connects with bus services. It is located between the Christianshavn and Lergravsparken stations. It is located in fare zone 1.

The station has bicycle parking facilities.
