= Kastrup station =

Copenhagen metro station

Kastrup
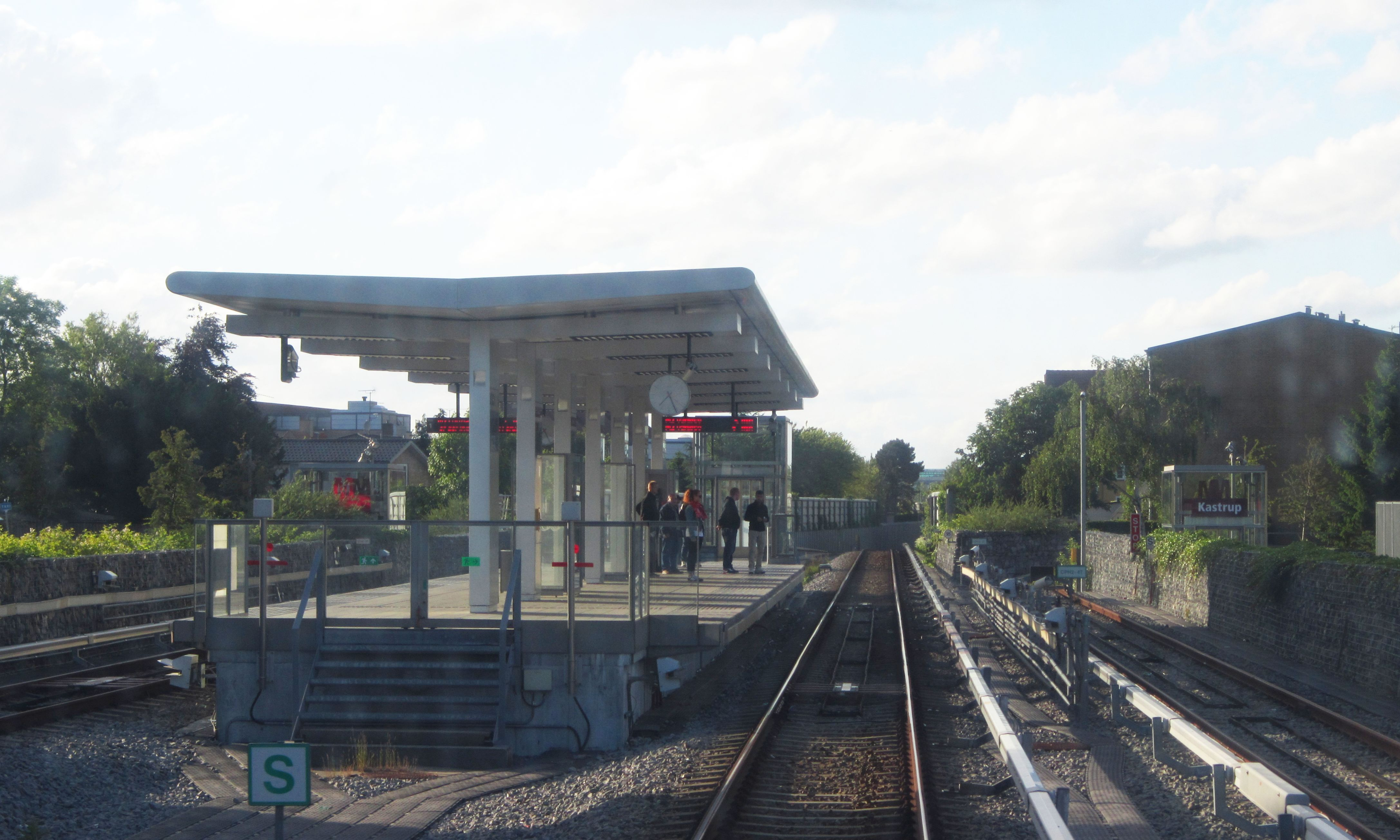

General information
- Other names: Den Blå Planet
- Location: Ved Stationen 1, 2770 Kastrup; Tårnby Municipality
- Coordinates: 55°38′9″N 12°38′48.7″E
- System: Copenhagen Metro Station
- Owner: Metroselskabet
- Platforms: 1 island platform
- Tracks: 2
- Bus routes: 31, 32

Construction
- Structure type: Elevated
- Accessible: Yes

Other information
- Station code: Ksa
- Fare zone: 4

History
- Opened: 28 September 2007; 18 years ago
- Former names: Alléen

Services
Preceding station	Copenhagen Metro	Following station
Femøren towards Vanløse	M2	Lufthavnen Terminus
Location
- Location within Greater Copenhagen Location within Denmark

Kastrup station is a rapid transit station of the Copenhagen Metro, located in the Kastrup section of Tårnby. It opened on 28 September 2007.

The station serves the M2 line. It is located in fare zone 4. It serves the residential area of Kastrup, while another station further south connects the metro to Kastrup Airport and the Øresund Railway.
