= 5 øre (World War II Danish coin) =

Coin used during German occupation

- Denmark
- Value: 5 Danish øre
- Mass: 2.4-6.4 g
- Diameter: 22-27 mm
- Edge: Plain
- Composition: 100% Al (1941); 100% Zn (1942-1945)
- Years of minting: 1941-1945

Obverse
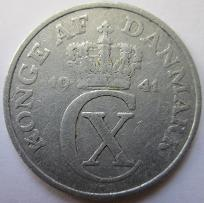
- Design: Crowned monogram of Christian X Lettering: KONGE AF DANMARK 1941 CX

Reverse
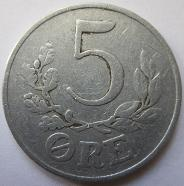
- Design: Denomination with oak and beech leaves Lettering: 5 ORE

The 5 øre coin was made during the German occupation of Denmark. It was first minted in aluminium in 1941, and then from 1942 to 1945 in zinc. The aluminium 5 øre is similar to the zinc variety, although the latter is a little smaller in diameter and heavier in weight.

== Mintage ==
1941 aluminium

Year	Mintage	Notes
1941	16,984,000	

1942-1945 zinc

Year	Mintage	Notes
1942	2,963,000	
1943	4,522,000	
1944	3,744,000	
1945	864,000	Rare
