= Øresund station =

Copenhagen metro station

Øresund
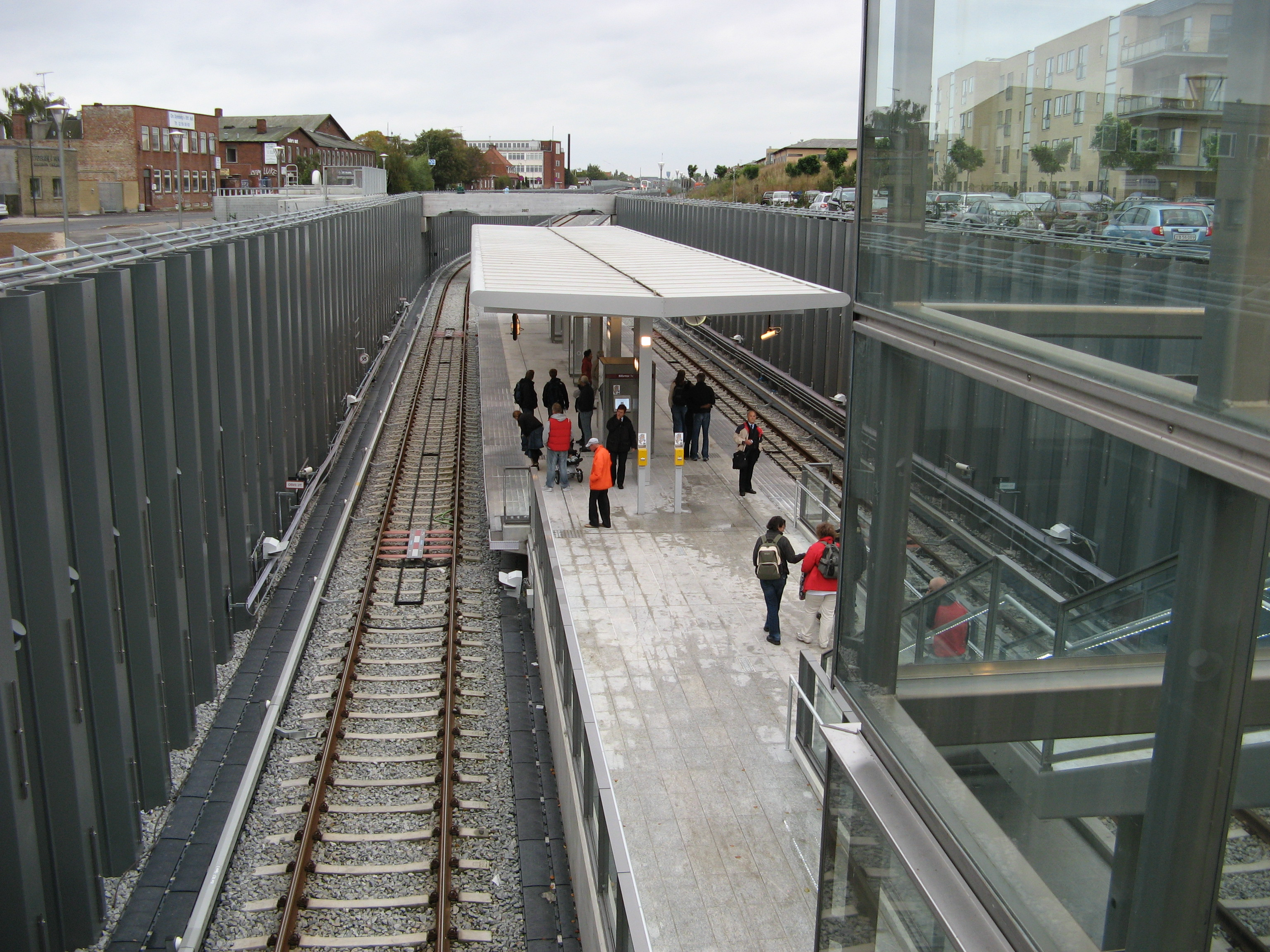

General information
- Location: Øresundsvej 146, 2300 Copenhagen S Copenhagen Municipality
- Coordinates: 55°39′42″N 12°37′43″E
- System: Copenhagen Metro station
- Owner: Metroselskabet
- Platforms: 1 island platform
- Tracks: 2

Construction
- Structure type: Through cut
- Accessible: Yes

Other information
- Station code: Øsv
- Fare zone: 3

History
- Opened: 28 September 2007; 18 years ago
- Former names: Øresundsvej, Helgoland

Services
Preceding station	Copenhagen Metro	Following station
Lergravsparken towards Vanløse	M2	Amager Strand towards Lufthavnen
Location
- Location within Copenhagen Location within Greater Copenhagen Location within Denmark

Øresund station is a station on the Copenhagen Metro, located in the Sundbyøster district of Copenhagen. It opened on 28 September 2007.

The station serves the M2 line, in fare zone 3.

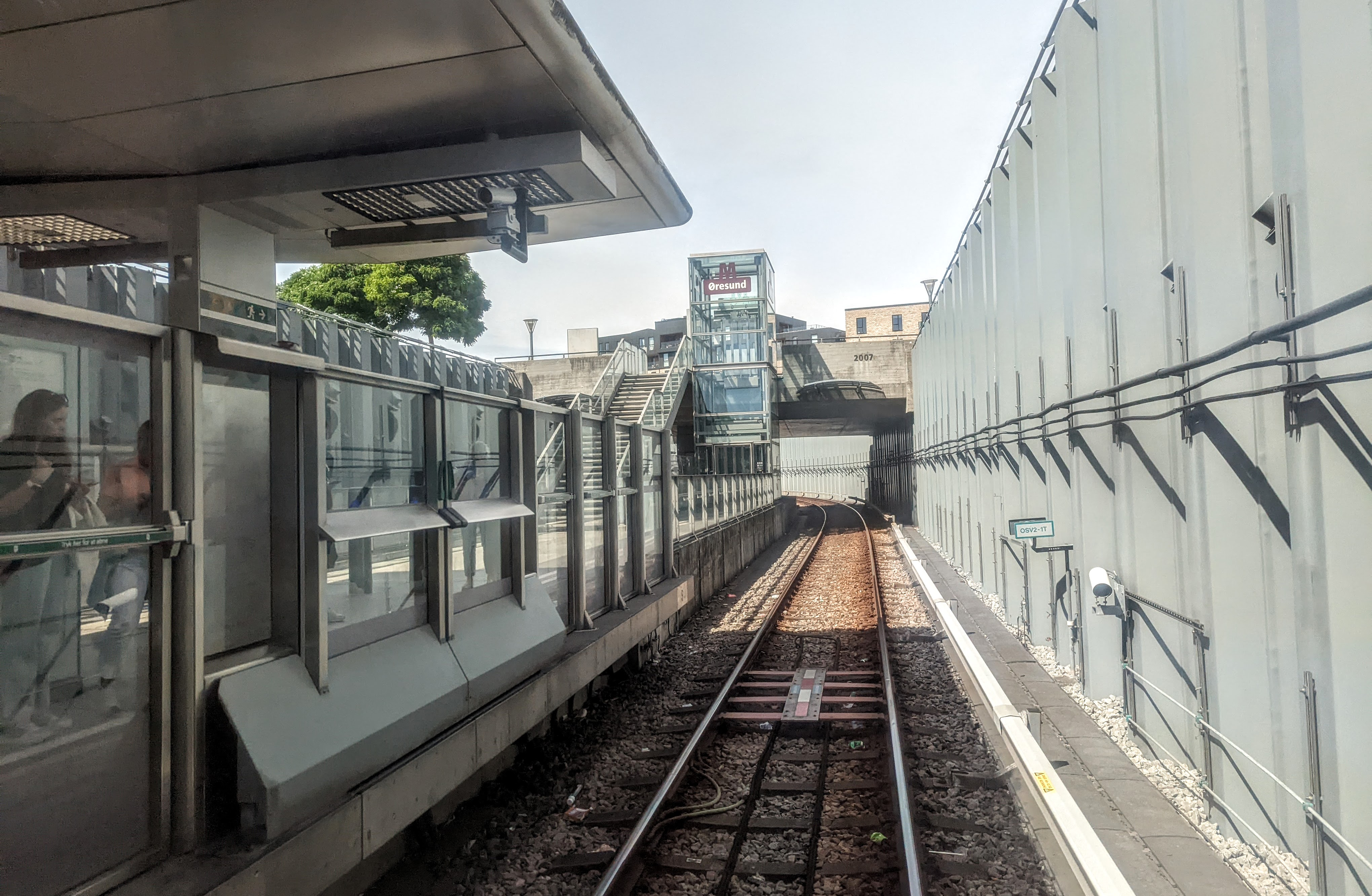
View from train, arriving from the south
