= Femøren station =

Copenhagen metro station

Femøren
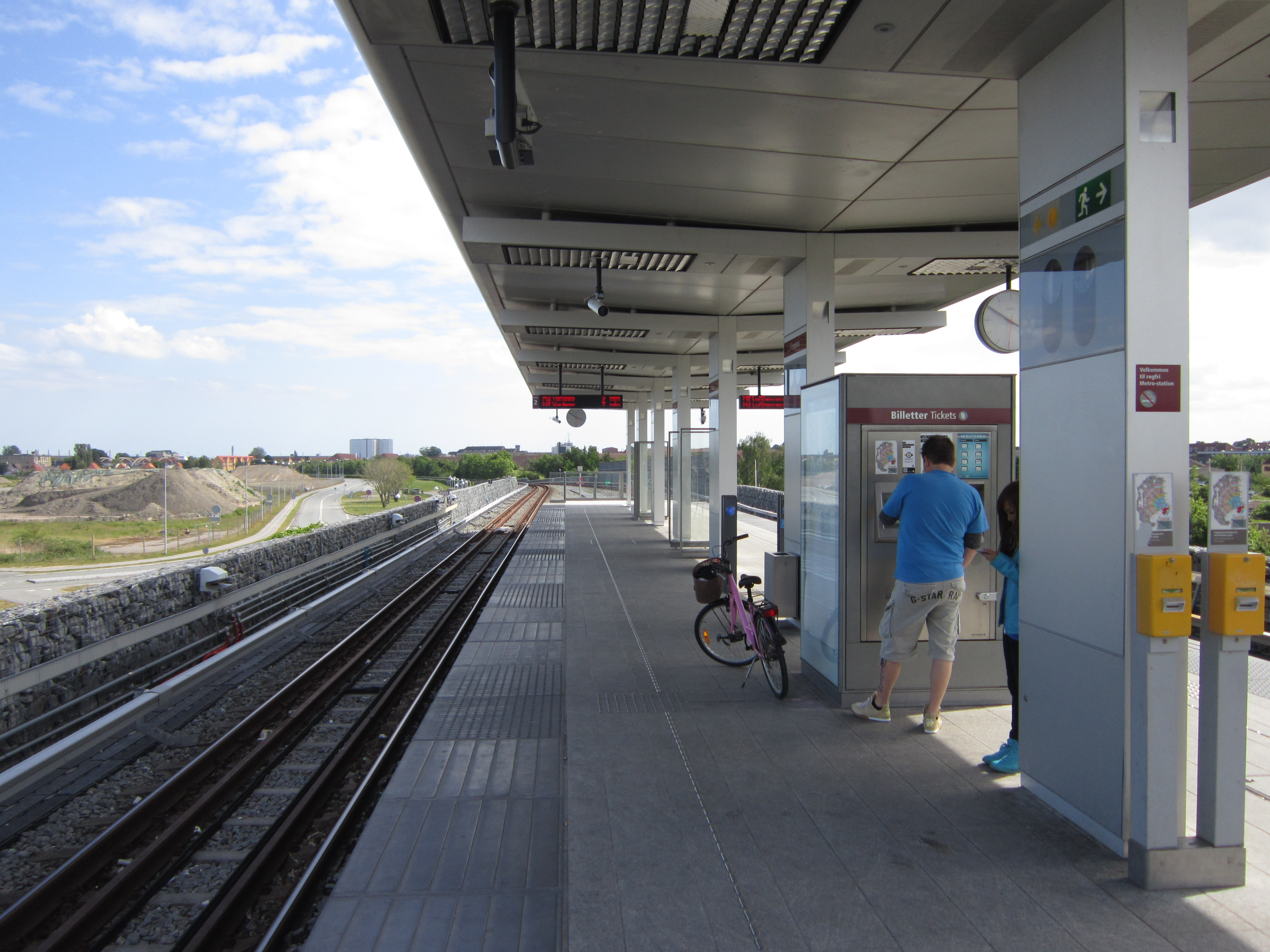

General information
- Location: Hedegårdsvej 50, 2300 Copenhagen S Copenhagen Municipality
- Coordinates: 55°38′43″N 12°38′18″E
- System: Copenhagen Metro Station
- Owner: Metroselskabet
- Platforms: 1 island platform
- Tracks: 2
- Bus routes: 78

Construction
- Structure type: Elevated
- Accessible: Yes

Other information
- Station code: Feø
- Fare zone: 3

History
- Opened: 28 September 2007; 19 years ago

Services
Preceding station	Copenhagen Metro	Following station
Amager Strand towards Vanløse	M2	Kastrup towards Lufthavnen
Location
- Location within Greater Copenhagen Location within Denmark

Femøren station is a rapid transit station on the Copenhagen Metro located in the Sundbyøster district of Copenhagen. It opened on 28 September 2007.

The station serves the M2 line. It is located in fare zone 3.

In 2012, the average number of passengers per day was 2,300 people.

== Amager Line ==
The Amager Line's "Syrevej Station" was located approximately 100 meters south of where Femøren Station is now located.
