= M2 (Copenhagen Metro) =

Metro line in Copenhagen, Denmark

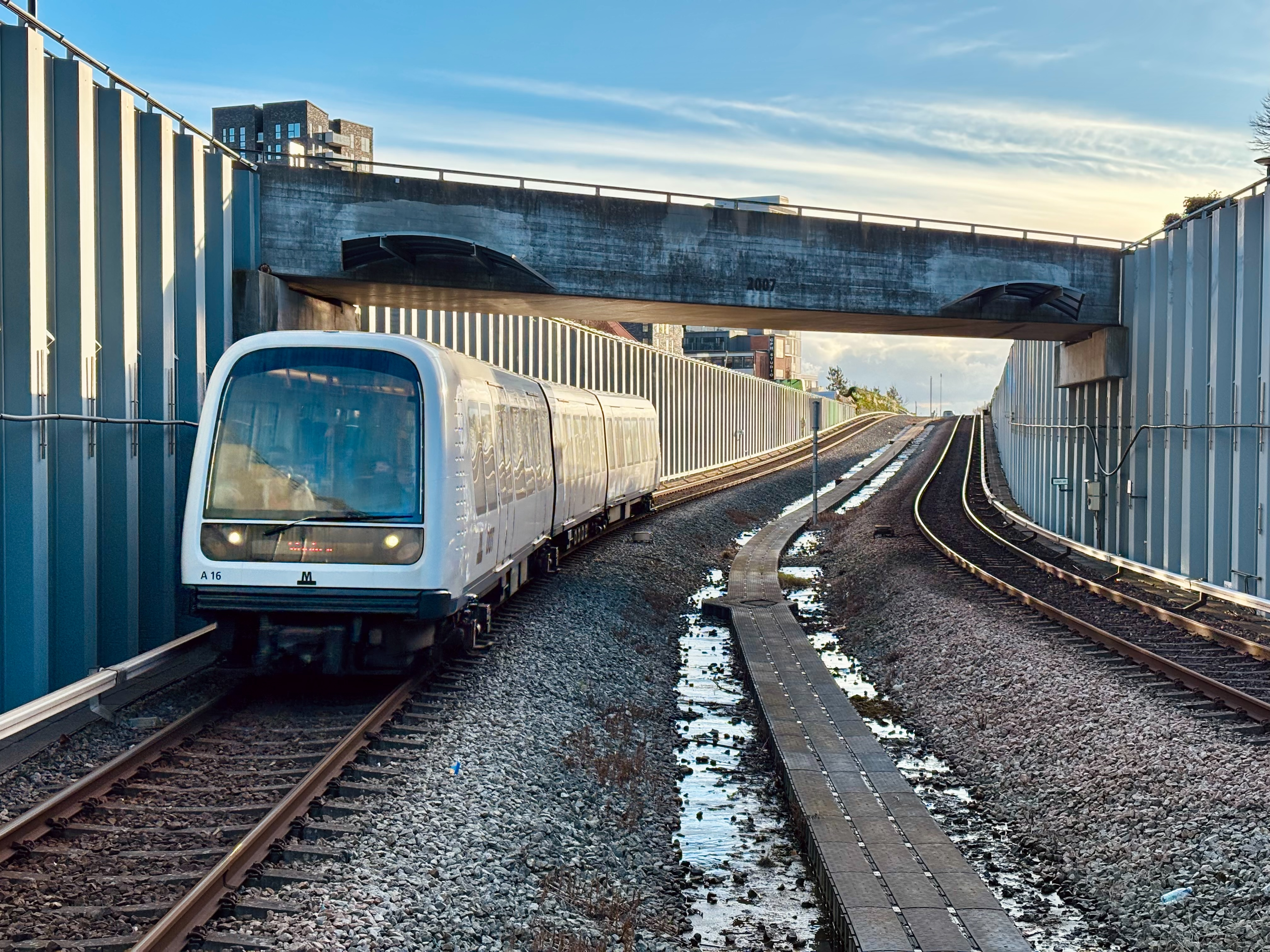
- M2 train approaching Øresund station

Overview
- Owner: Metroselskabet
- Locale: Copenhagen, Denmark
- Termini: Lufthavnen; Vanløse
- Stations: 16

Service
- Type: Rapid transit
- System: Copenhagen Metro
- Operator: Metro Service

History
- Opened: 19 October 2002; 23 years ago
- Last extension: 2007

Technical
- Line length: 14.2 km (8.8 mi)
- Number of tracks: Double
- Character: Elevated and Underground
- Track gauge: 1,435 mm (4 ft 8 1/2 in) standard gauge
- Electrification: 750 V DC third rail
- Operating speed: 80 km/h (50 mph)
Route map

M2 is a line of the Copenhagen Metro, colored yellow on the map. It runs from Vanløse to Lufthavnen through the center of Copenhagen, sharing track with the M1 from Vanløse to Christianshavn. The line was built along with M1 as part of the redevelopment of Ørestad. The principle of the line was passed in 1992, and construction commenced in 1998. The line opened in several stages between 2002 and 2007. It is owned by Metroselskabet and operated by Metro Service, and operates with a headway between four and twenty minutes.

The line is 14.2 kilometers (8.8 mi) long, and runs in a tunnel through the city center between Lindevang and Amager Strand. It connects the western borough of Vanløse and the municipality of Frederiksberg to the city center of Copenhagen, as well as the eastern parts of Amager and Copenhagen Airport. It provides transfer to the S-train at three stations and to DSB trains at two stations.

Its southern end, in the district of Amager Øst, largely follows the same route as a disused railway line, Amagerbanen, along the coast of Øresund.

== History ==
The background for the metro was the urban development of the Ørestad area of Copenhagen. The principle of building a rail transit system was passed by the Parliament of Denmark on 24 June 1992, with the Ørestad Act. The responsibility for developing the area, as well as building and operating the metro, was given to the Ørestad Development Corporation, a joint venture between Copenhagen Municipality (45%) and the Ministry of Finance (55%). Initially, three modes of transport were considered: a tramway, a light rail system that would have seen trams running underground through the city center, and a rapid transit (metro) system. In October 1994, the Development Corporation chose a light rapid transit system, combining elements of a light rail system and rapid transit to form a low-capacity metro network.

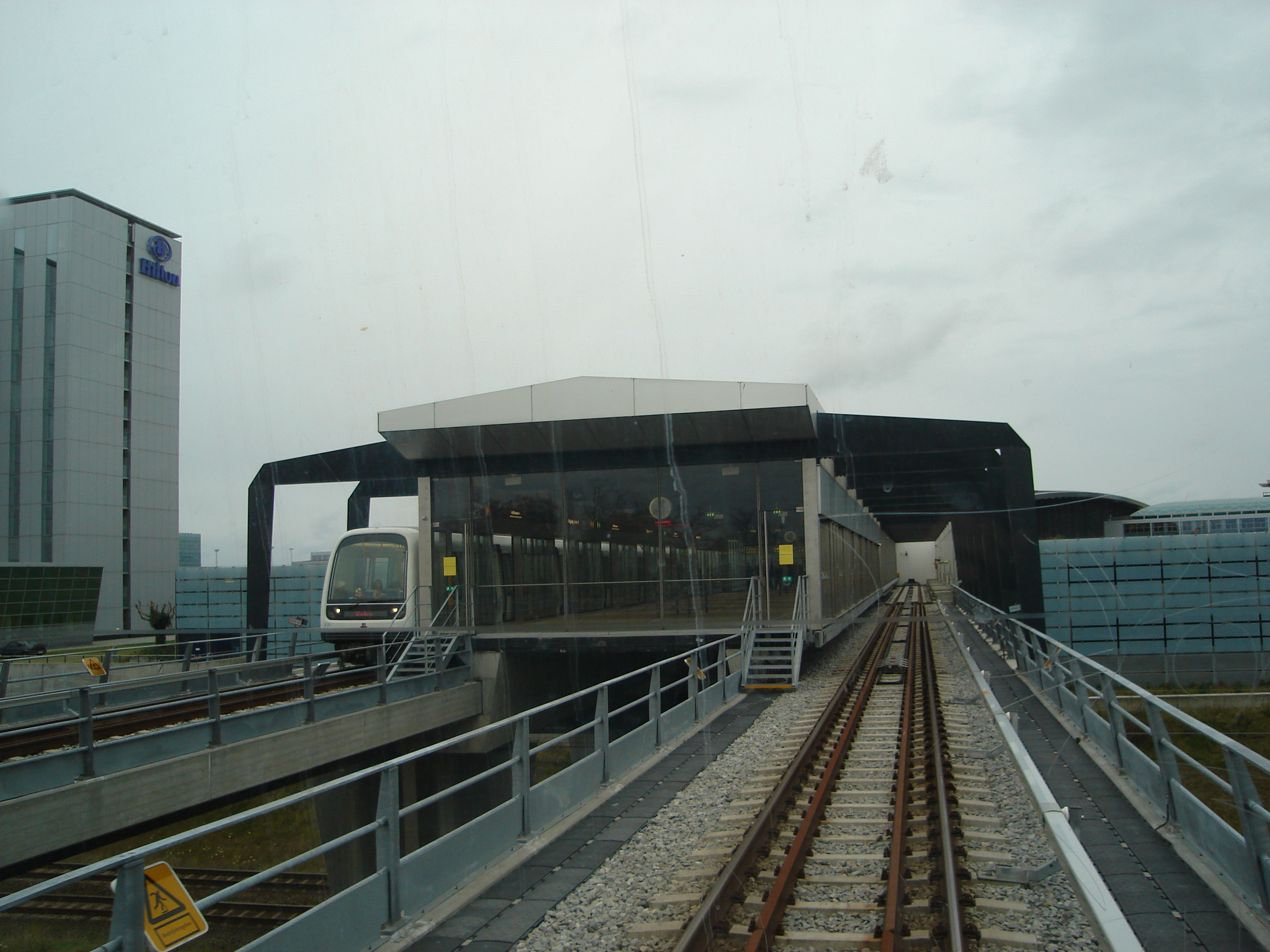
Lufthavnen Station serves Copenhagen Airport

The decision to build stage 2, from Nørreport to Vanløse, and stage 3 to the airport, was made by parliament on 21 December 1994. Stage 2 involved the establishment of the company Fredriksbergbaneselskapet I/S in February 1995, owned 70% by the Ørestad Development Corporation and 30% by Fredriksberg Municipality. The third stage would be built by Østamagerbaneselskapet I/S, established in September 1995 and owned 55% by the Ørestad Development Corporation and 45% by Copenhagen County. In October 1996, a contract was signed with the Copenhagen Metro Construction Group (COMET) for building the lines, and with Ansaldo for delivery of the trains and operate the system the first five years. COMET was a consortium comprised Astaldi, Bachy, SAE, Ilbau, NCC Rasmussen & Schiøtz Anlæg and Tarmac Construction.

Construction started in November 1996, with the moving of underground pipes and wires around the station areas. In August 1997, work commenced at the depot, and in September, COMET started the first mainline construction work. In October and November, the two tunnel boring machines (TMB), christened Liva and Bette, were delivered. They started digging each barrel of the tunnel from Islands Brygge in February 1998. The same month, the Public Transport Authority gave the necessary permits to operate a driverless metro. The section between Fasanvej and Frederiksberg is a former S-train line, and was last operated as such on 20 June 1998.

The first section of tunnel was completed by September 1998, after which the TMBs moved to Havnegade. By December 1998, work had started on all the initial nine stations. Plans for M2 were presented to the public in April 1999, with a debate emerging if the proposed elevated solution was the best. In May, the first trains were delivered, and trial runs began at the depot. In December, the tunnels were completed to Strandlodsvej, and the TMBs were moved to Havnegade, where they started to grind towards Frederiksberg. From 1 January 2000, the S-train service from Solbjerg to Vanløse was terminated, and work to rebuild to metro started. By February 2001, all tunnels were finished.

In March 2001, the Copenhagen County Council decided to start construction of stage 3. On 6 November 2001, the first train operates through a tunnel section and on 28 November, laying of tracks along stage 1 and stage 2A completed. An agreement about financing stage 3 was reached on 12 April. By 22 May, the 18 delivered trains had test-run 100,000 kilometers (60,000 mi). The section from Nørreport to Lergravsparken and Vestamager was opened on 19 October 2002. Initially, the system had a 12-minute headway on each of the two services. From 3 December this was reduced to 9 minutes, and from 19 December to 6 minutes. Operation of the system was subcontracted to Ansaldo, who again subcontracted it to Metro Service, a subsidiary of Serco. The contract had a duration of five years, with an option for extension for another three.

Trial runs on the next section of metro, stage 2A from Nørreport to Frederiksberg, began on 24 February. It opened on 29 May 2003. All changes to bus and train schedules in Copenhagen took place on 25 May, but to allow Queen Margrethe II to open the line, the opening needed to be adapted to her calendar. This caused four days without a bus service along the line. Stage 2B, from Frederiksberg to Vanløse, opened on 12 October.

Forum Station was nominated for the European Union Prize for Contemporary Architecture in 2005. In 2007, the Ørestad Development Corporation was discontinued, and the ownership of the metro was transferred to Metroselskabet I/S. The 4.5-kilometre (2.8 mi) stage 3 opened on 28 September 2007, from Lergravsparken to the airport. It followed for the most part the route of the former Amager Line of the Danish State Railways. With this stage complete, 34 trains had been delivered. However, the line had caused a heated debate, and several locals had organized themselves in the Amager Metro Group. They demanded that the line instead be tunneled, arguing that it caused a physical barrier in Amager and that it created noise pollution.

== Route ==

M2 starts at Vanløse, which serves mostly a residential area, and where there is transfer to the S-train's lines C and H. The line starts elevated and is located in fare zone 2. The line then runs into the enclave municipality of Frederiksberg, running parallel to the Frederikssund Line of the S-train. At Flintholm, there is transfer to the C, F and H-lines of the S-train. Flintholm is the country's third-largest public transport hub. The station is located at the Grøndal Park, and is the borderline between the urban and suburban Copenhagen. The area around Lindevang is a redeveloped industrial area, which now is mostly residential, in addition to hosting the Copenhagen Business School.

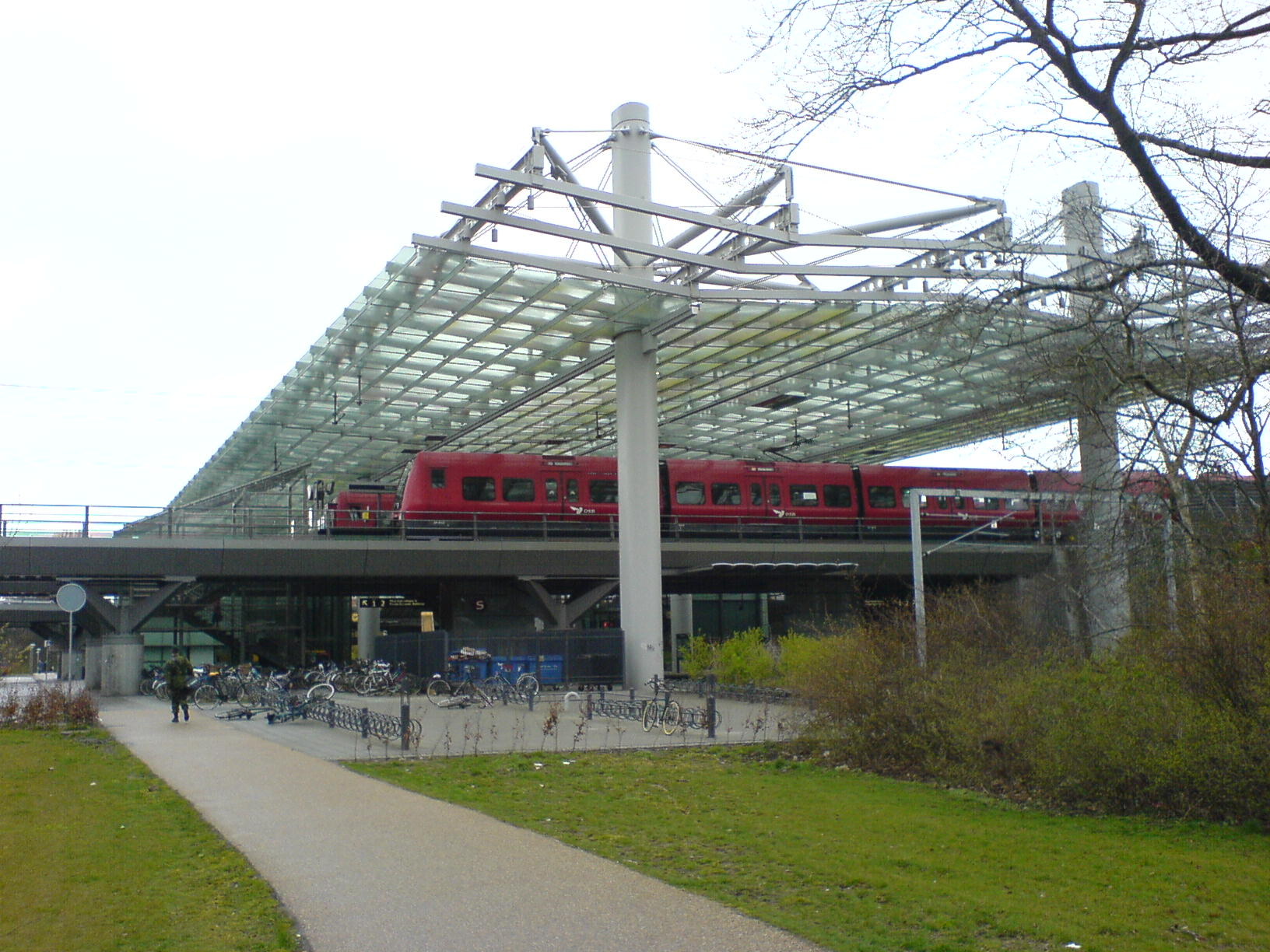
Flintholm, with the red S-trains on the top

After Lindevang, the line dives into the tunnel that it follows through the city center. At Fasanvej there is another campus of the Copenhagen Business School. Frederiksberg serves the center of the municipality, that in addition to many public offices and cultural facilities, serves the University of Copenhagen's Frederiksberg Campus and another campus of the Copenhagen Business School. This station is located in both fare zone 1 and 2. Frederiksberg became a transfer station to M3 when the City Circle Line was opened on 29 September 2019. Forum is the last station in Frederiksberg Municipality, but located only a few blocks from the Copenhagen borough of Nørrebro. The Forum area is a residential area built during the 1930s and 1940, built in functionalism, and hosts the Royal Danish Academy of Music.

Nørreport lies within Indre By—the city center of Copenhagen. It is the main intersection with DSB's intercity and regional trains, as well as the S-train, serving lines A, B, C, E and H. Kongens Nytorv lies at the heart of the commercial and cultural center of Copenhagen. When the City Circle Line opened, the station serves as the transfer to lines M3 and M4. Christianshavn is located on an island, a former navy base that has been redeveloped into residential and commercial mix. It is the last station served by both lines, with M1 branching off towards Vestamager, and m2 continuing towards Lufthavnen.

Amagerbro is located in the borough of Amager Øst, and is the first station on the island of Amager. The surrounding area combines a residential area with night life and many shops. Lergravsparken is surrounded by an older, dense residential area, although it has experienced commercial growth after the metro arrived. After Lergravsparken, the line emerges and runs on an embankment or elevated the rest of the way to the airport. The line also enters the municipality of Tårnby and passes into fare zone 3. Øresund is located in an industrial area, and is one of only four stations to have no bus service.

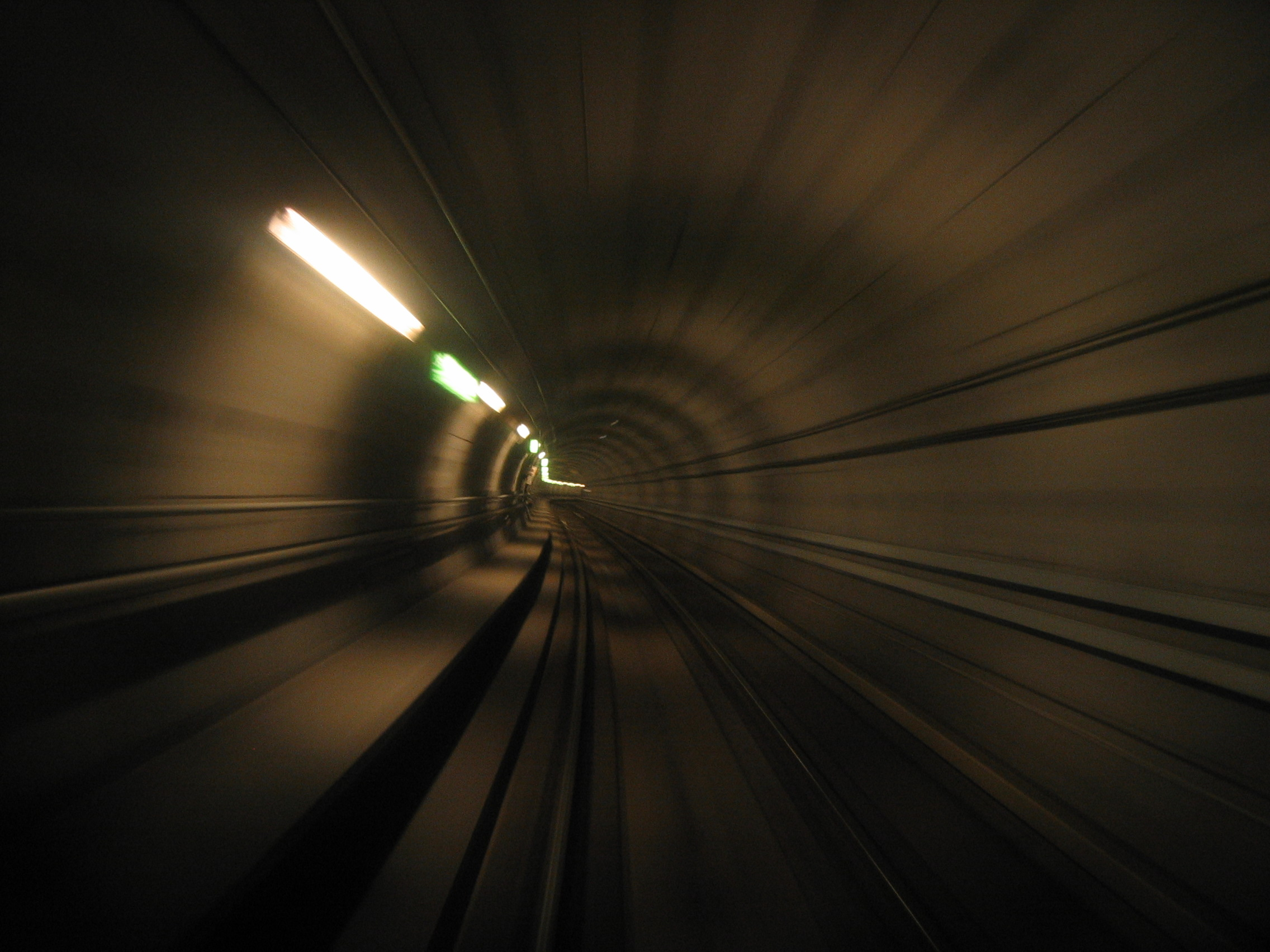
Inside the tunnel

Amager Strand is located 400 meters (1,300 ft) from Amager Beach Park, that runs 4.6 kilometers (2.9 mi) along the coast of Amager. This station also has no connecting bus services. Femøren is located in an industrial area, but also near the park Tiøen. Kastrup is the first station in fare zone 4. It is located in a predominately industrial area, but the area also features a marina and other aquatic leisure facilities.

Lufthavnen (Airport) is the terminus of M2. It is located at Terminal 3 of Copenhagen Airport, the largest airport in the Nordic countries and the main hub for Scandinavian Airlines, and a hub for Norwegian Air Shuttle. There is also transfer to the mainline train station, which serves DSB's intercity and regional trains, and international trains to Sweden, the regional Oresundtrain and SJ's X 2000 intercity service to Stockholm.

== Service ==
The Copenhagen Metro system operates continually (24/7) with a varying headway throughout the day. During rush hour (07:00–10:00 and 15:00–18:00), there is a four-minute headway on each of M1 and M2. On Thursday, Friday and Saturday nights (24:00–05:00), the headway is fifteen minutes, and on other nights it is twenty minutes on all sections of the metro (M2 trains provide a shortened service when travelling at night on weekdays, during which time travellers between Lufthavnen and stations towards Vanløse must change trains at Christianshavn to M1.) At all other times, there is a six-minute headway. On the section shared with M1, there is half the headway (except during night on weekdays). Travel time along the whole line is 24 minutes, with the section from the airport to Nørreport taking 15 minutes and from Nørreport to Vanløse taking 9 minutes.

The line is owned by Metroselskabet and operated by Metro Service. The line uses 34 AnsaldoBreda Driverless Metro vehicles that are shared with M1. The depot is located at the Service and Maintenance Center at Vestamager on M1.
