= Vanløse railway station =

Commuter and rapid transit railway station in Copenhagen, Denmark

Vanløse
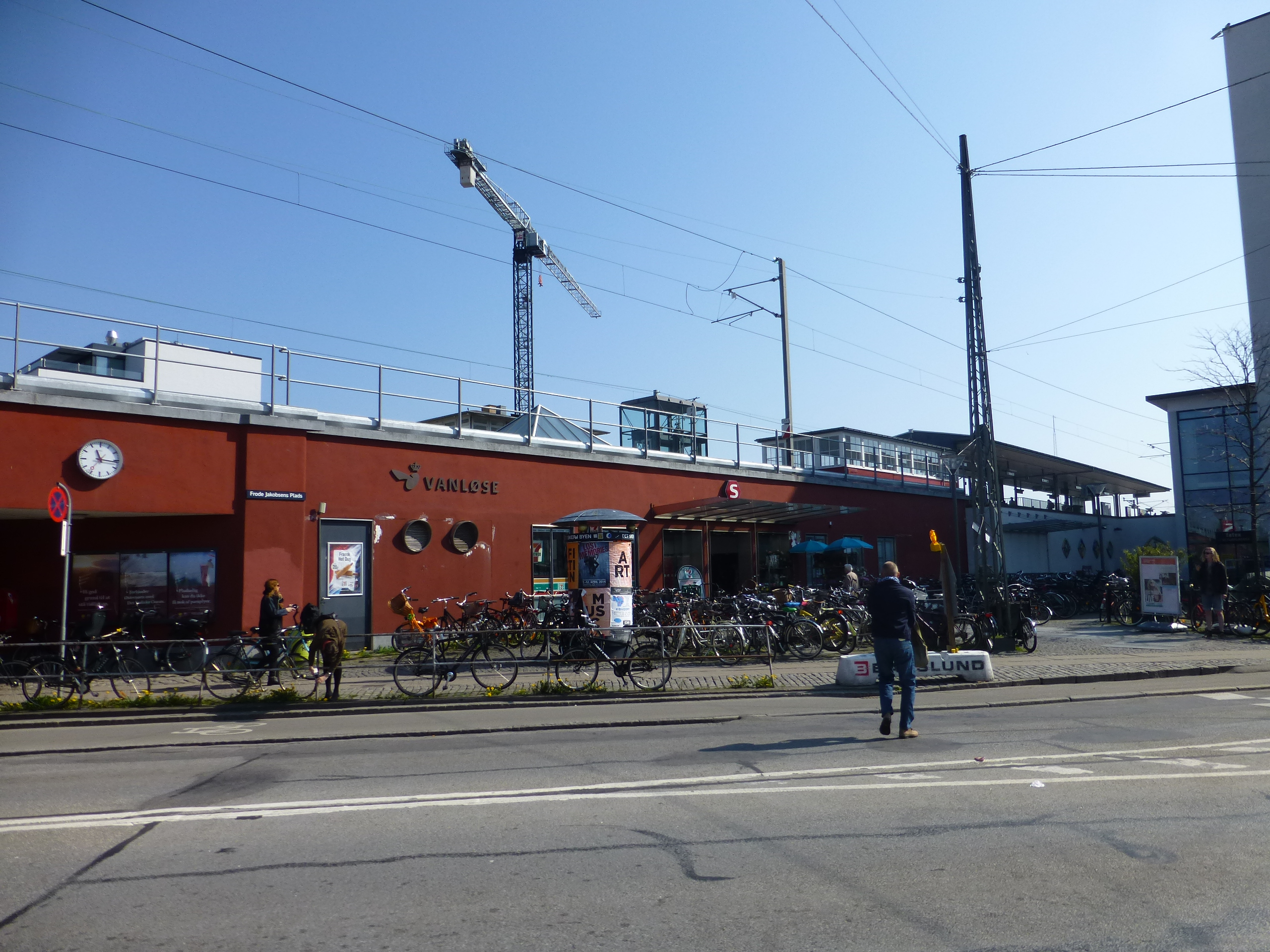
- Vanløse station in 2014

General information
- Location: Jernbane Alle 46; 2720 Vanløse; Copenhagen Municipality; Denmark
- Coordinates: 55°41′14″N 12°29′30″E
- Elevation: 13.7 metres (45 ft)
- System: S-train and Metro station
- Owner: DSB (station infrastructure); Banedanmark (rail infrastructure)
- Platforms: 2 island platforms
- Tracks: 4 (2 for S-train, 2 for Metro)
- Train operators: DSB
- Bus routes: 10, 22, 26, 31, 142

Construction
- Structure type: At grade (Metro); Elevated (S-train)
- Platform levels: 2
- Accessible: Yes

Other information
- Station code: Van
- Fare zone: 2

History
- Opened: 15 June 1898; 12 October 2003 (Metro)
- Rebuilt: 3 April 1934 (Ringline converted to S-train); 23 September 1941 (Frederikssundbanen converted to S-train)
- Electrified: 1934/1941 (S-train), 2003 (Metro)

Services
Preceding station	S-train	Following station
Flintholm towards Klampenborg	C	Herlev towards Frederikssund
Flintholm towards Klampenborg	C Sat–Sun	Jyllingevej towards Frederikssund
Flintholm towards Østerport	H Mon–Fri	Jyllingevej towards Ballerup
Preceding station	Copenhagen Metro	Following station
Terminus	M1	Flintholm towards Vestamager
Terminus	M2	Flintholm towards Lufthavnen
Location

Vanløse station is an S-train and rapid transit railway station serving the district of Vanløse in Copenhagen, Denmark. The station is an intermediate station on the Frederikssund radial of Copenhagen's S-train network and is the western terminus of lines M1 and M2 of the Copenhagen Metro. It is located in fare zone 2. The station has two platforms, the lower level platform is used for metro services, and the upper level platform is used for S-train services on the Frederikssund line. Between 1934 and 2002 the station was the terminus of S-trains on the Ring Line, which reversed at a platform formerly located on the site of the metro station.

== Gallery ==
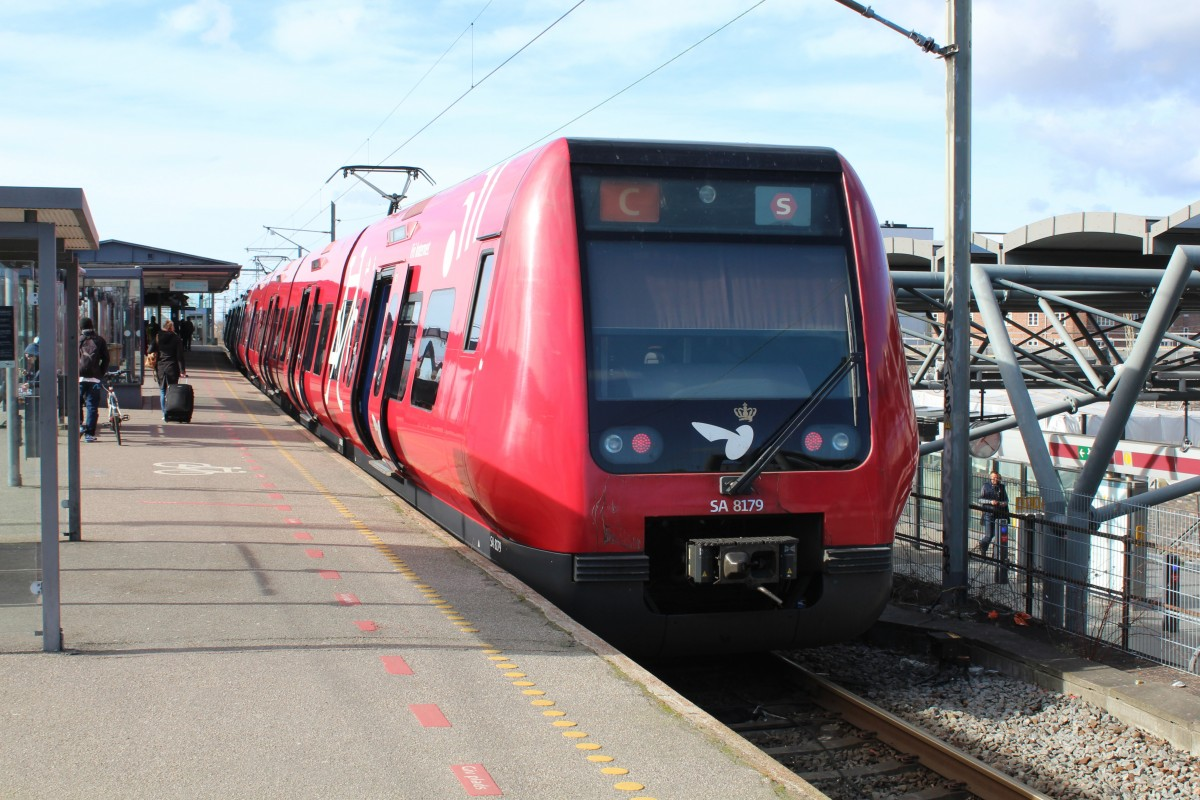
S-train at Vanløse station

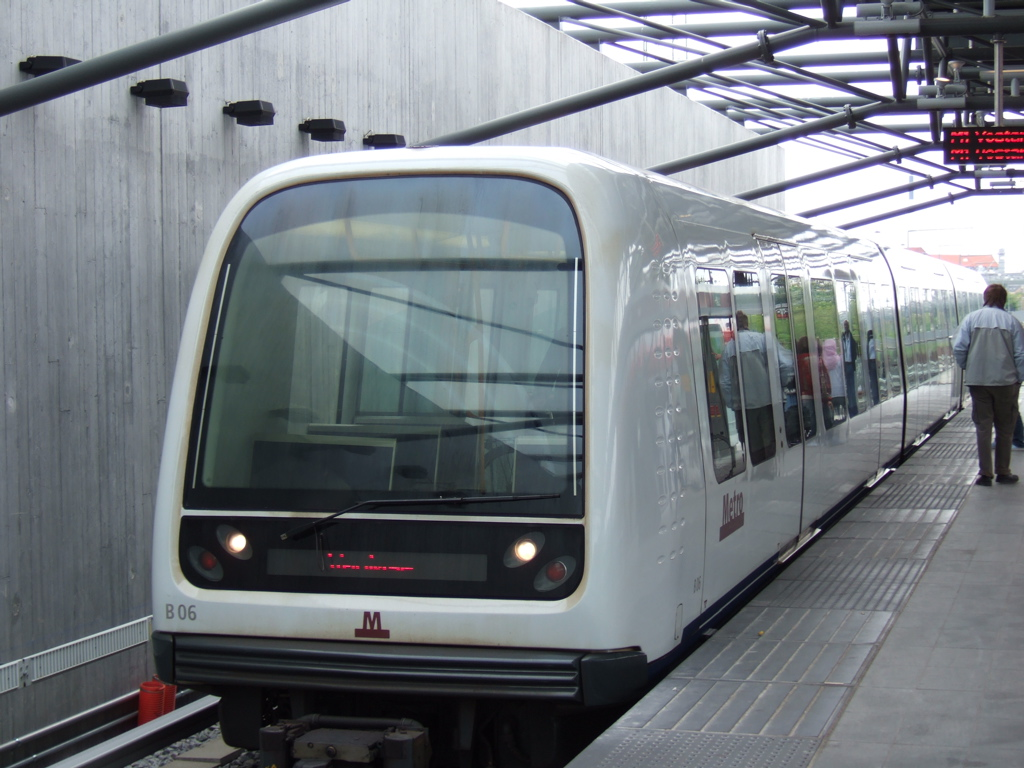
Metro train at Vanløse station

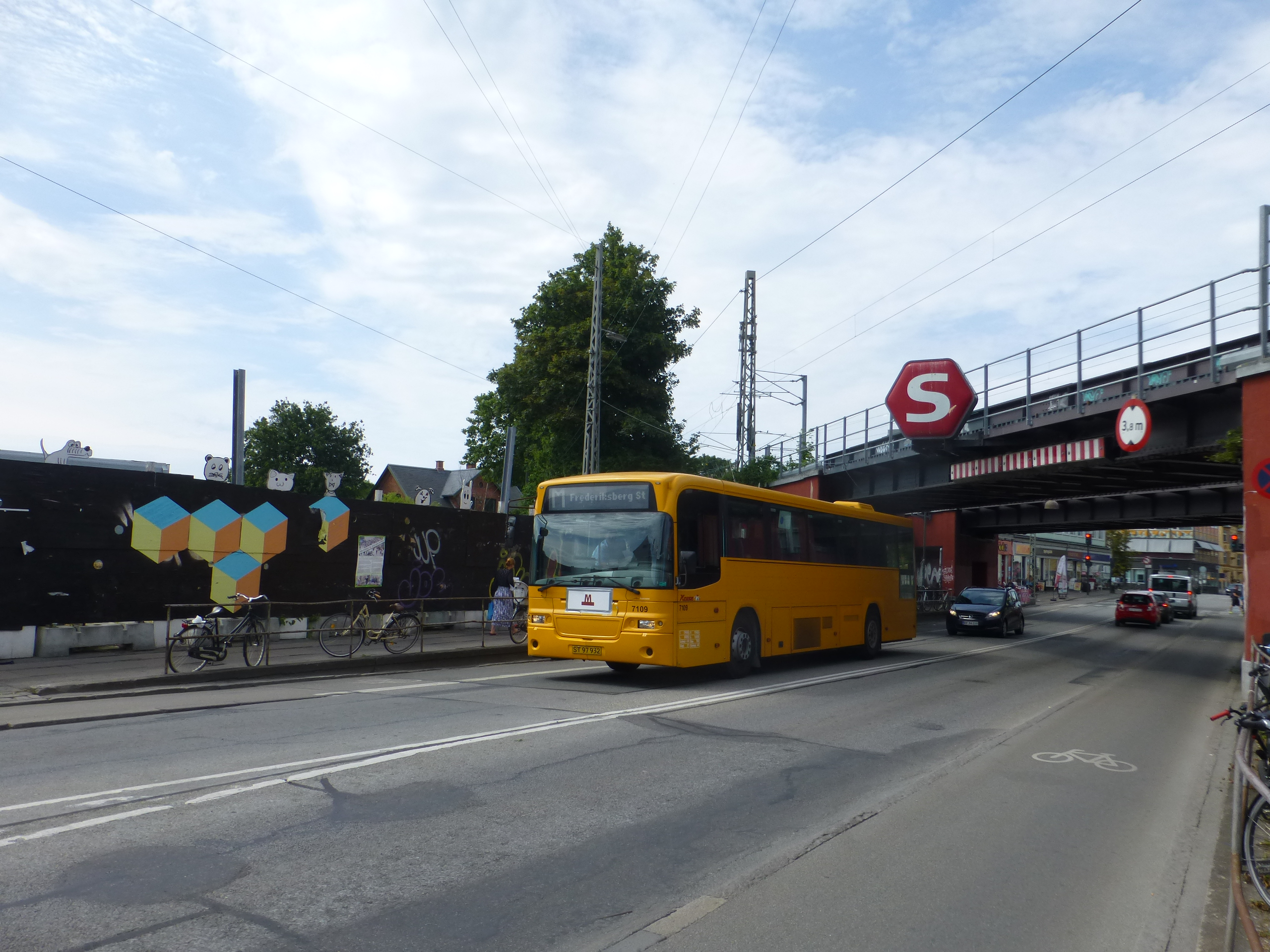
Bus at Vanløse station

== See also ==
- List of Copenhagen Metro stations
- List of Copenhagen S-train stations
- List of railway stations in Denmark
