= Lufthavnen station =

Copenhagen metro station

Lufthavnen
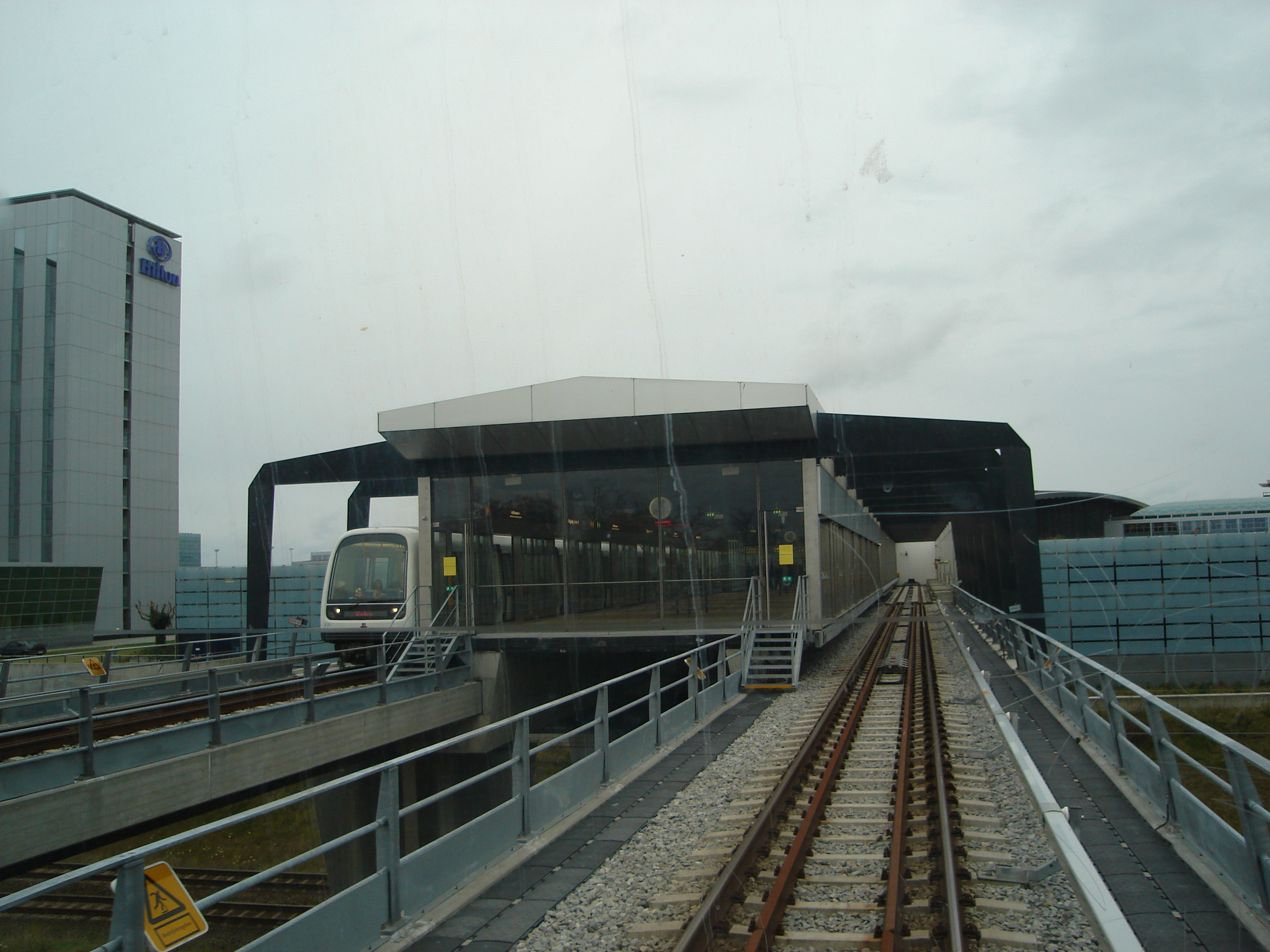

General information
- Location: P-7 på Ellehammersvej, 2770 Kastrup; Tårnby Municipality
- Coordinates: 55°37′51″N 12°38′57″E
- System: Copenhagen Metro Station
- Owner: Metroselskabet
- Platforms: 1 island platform
- Tracks: 2
- Bus routes: 35, 36, 5C
- Connections: Copenhagen Airport

Construction
- Structure type: Elevated
- Accessible: Yes

Other information
- IATA code: CPH
- Fare zone: 4

History
- Opened: 28 September 2007; 19 years ago

Services
Preceding station	Copenhagen Metro	Following station
Kastrup towards Vanløse	M2	Terminus
Location
- Location within Greater Copenhagen Location within Denmark

Lufthavnen station (Danish pronunciation: [ˈlɔftˌhɑwˀn stæˈɕoˀn]; Airport Station) is a rapid transit station of the Copenhagen Metro, located at Copenhagen Airport on the island of Amager. The station is the terminus of the M2 line and is located in fare zone 4.

Trains approach the station by a bridge over the Øresund Motorway (E20). The platform area is constructed above the tracks of the Øresund Line adjoining a multi-storey car park. The station connects to the airport at the north end of Terminal 3 on level 2.

Intercity and regional trains operate out of the mainline Copenhagen Airport railway station which is located beneath the airport terminal building, around 200 metres (660 ft) from the Lufthavnen Station.

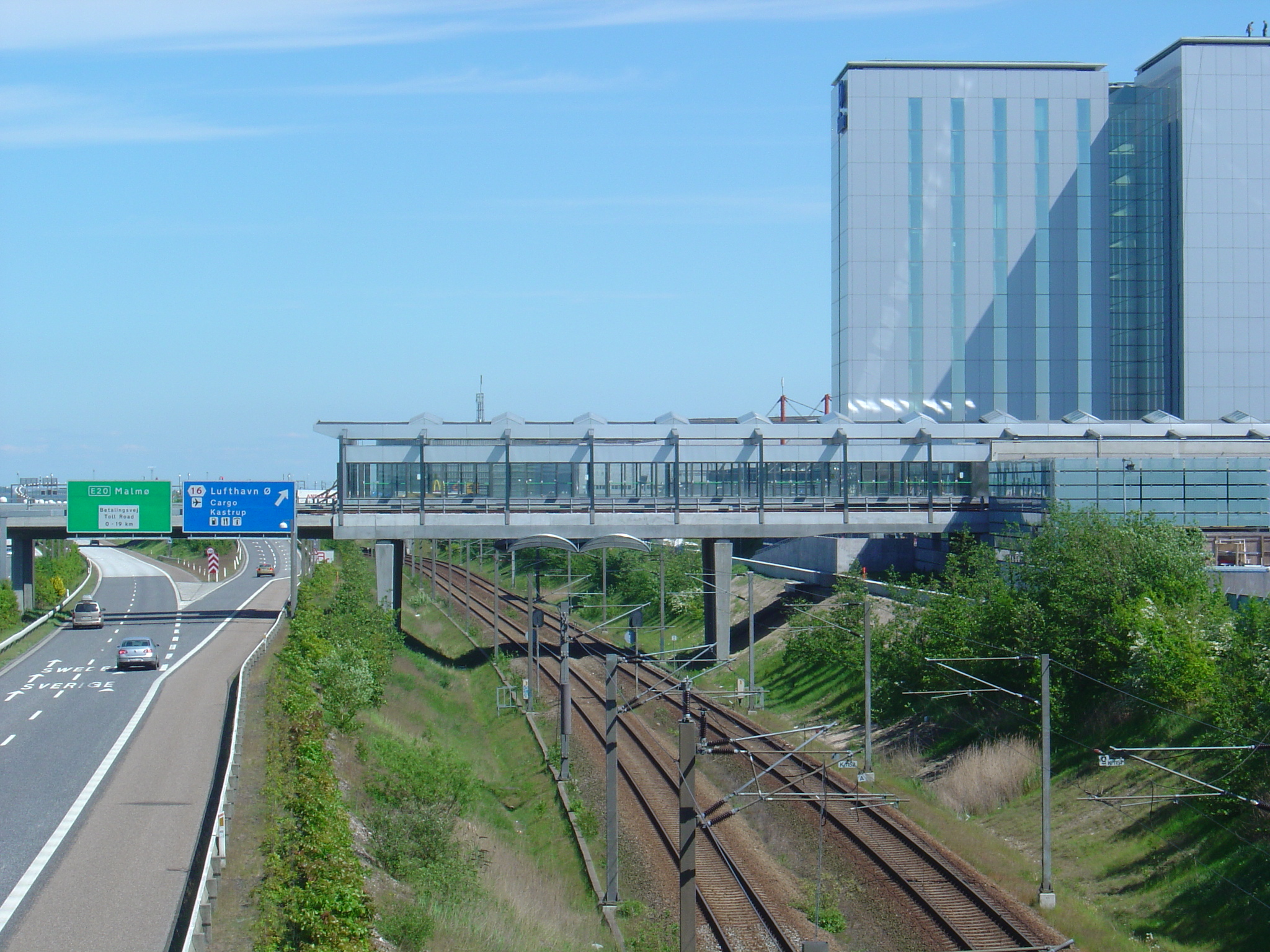
The Metro structure bridges the motorway and railway line.

== See also ==
- List of Copenhagen Metro stations
