= Lone Wiggers =

Danish architect

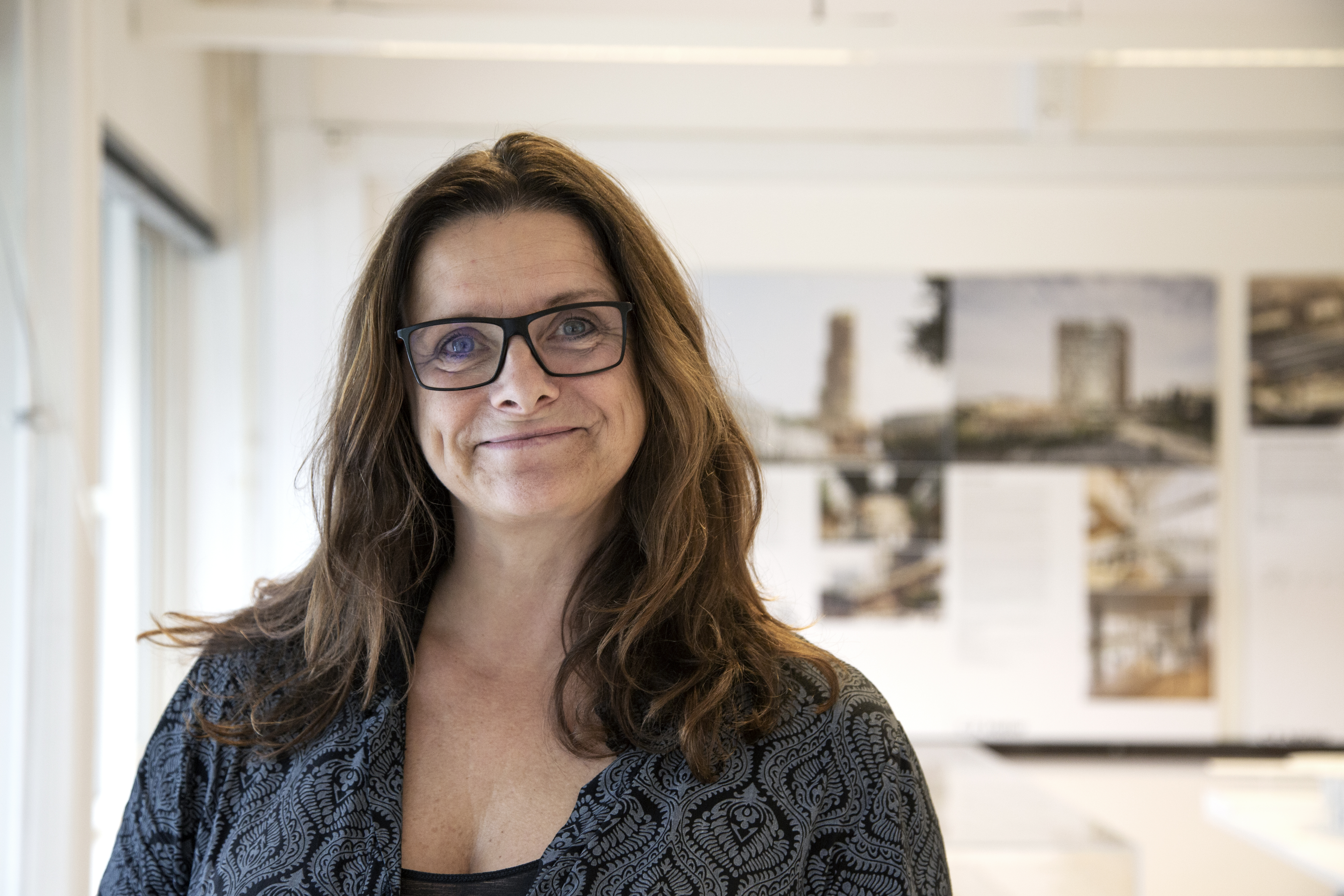
Lone Wiggers, 2019

Lone Wiggers (born 1963, in Helsingør) is a Danish architect, one of the partners at C. F. Møller Architects.

== Biography ==
Wiggers studied architecture at the Aarhus School of Architecture and the Ecole des Beaux Arts in Paris. After a year in London working with the Project Design Partnership (1989), she returned to Copenhagen where she joined Anna Maria Indrio (1990) before joining C. F. Møller Architects where she became a partner in 1997. Wiggers has participated in a wide range of projects including residential housing, commercial buildings, schools, old people's homes, hospitals and museums. They cover both new constructions and the conversion and restoration of older buildings. She has served on many boards and committees, heading the architecture committee for the Danish Ministry of Culture's cultural canon and participating in the Special Building Survey Council for the Cultural Heritage Board since 2003.

== Awards ==
Wiggers was awarded the Copenhagen Masons' Guild's Architecture Prize in 1999 and the Nykredit Architecture Prize in 2006.
