= Bikuben Kollegium =

Student dormitory in Copenhagen, Denmark

Coordinates: 55°39′46″N 12°35′36″E

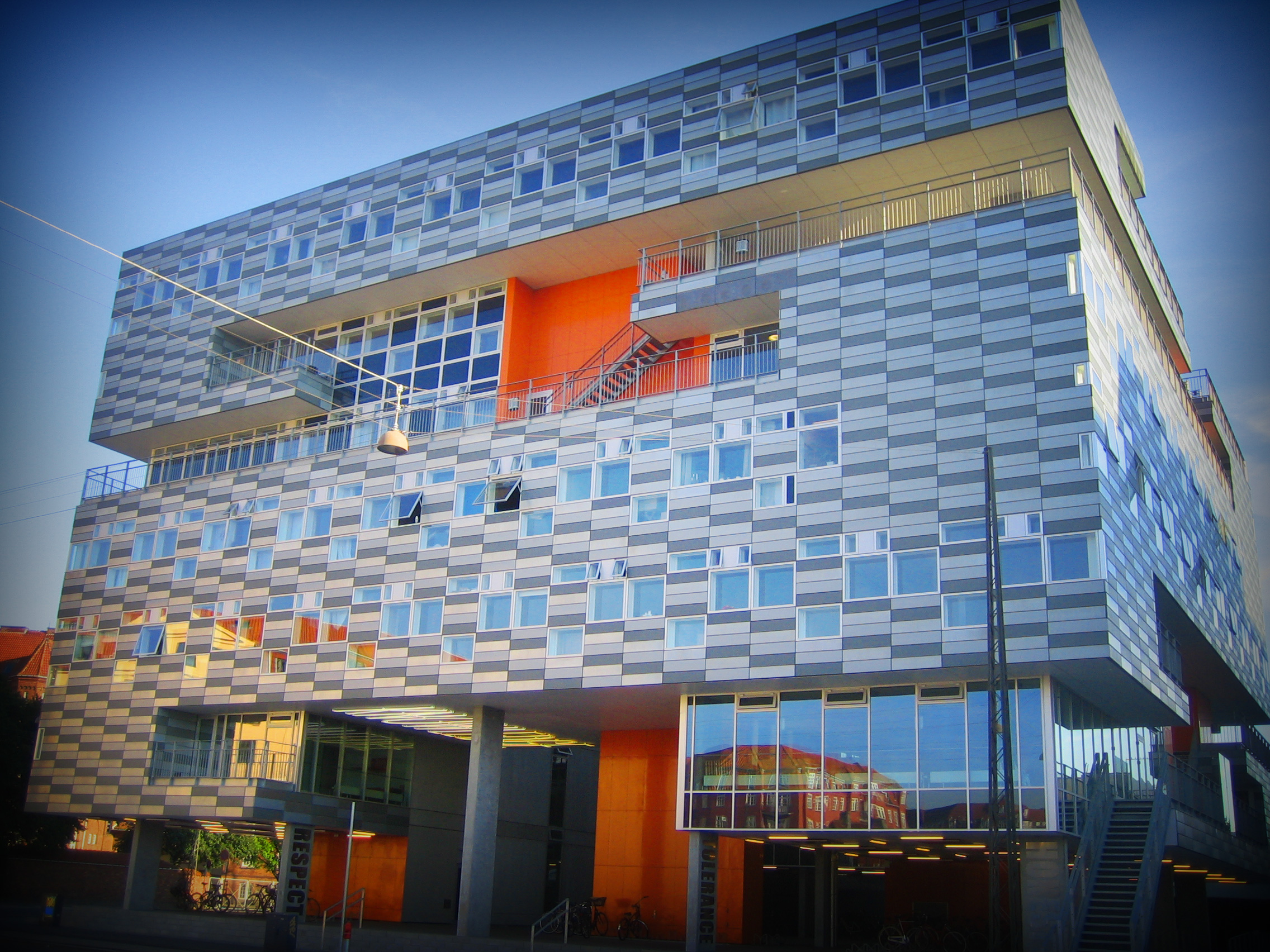
Bikubenkollegiet as seen from Njalsgade, Copenhagen

Bikuben Kollegium (Danish: Bikuben Kollegiet) is a privately owned dormitory for students in Ørestad, Copenhagen.

Opening in August 2006, Bikuben Kollegium is located on the corner of Amager Fælledvej and Njalsgade next to the University of Copenhagen's South Campus. The dorm was designed by the Aart Architects, an Aarhus based firm having as its ambition to make new forms of student communities possible. Kitchens and common areas are thus distributed on various floors, facing an inner yard.

The dormitory has 96 one room dwellings and four two room apartments as well a small number of homes for handicapped students and families. There are also furnished rooms, reserved for foreign students. The rent is DKK 2,985 per month for the smallest type of room.

The light art which can be seen at the entrance was created by the artist Viera Collaro.

Among a lot of dormitories in the area, Grønjordskollegiet is located 1 km South of Bikuben Kollegiet.
