= Craig Pohlman =

American psychologist

- Education: Brown University (A.B., 1989), University of North Carolina-Chapel Hill (M.Ed., 1995, Ph.D., 1997)
- Occupations: Psychologist, author

Craig Pohlman is a licensed psychologist in North Carolina, U.S., who specializes in learning issues. He is the Director of Mind Matters at Southeast Psych, a program that focuses on learning. Pohlman has authored and co-authored several books, chapters, articles, and blogs centered on learning.

== Education and experience ==
Pohlman received his A.B. in Psychology from Brown University and his M.Ed. and Ph.D. in School Psychology from the University of North Carolina at Chapel Hill. While at UNC – Chapel Hill, he trained at The Clinical Center for the Study of Development and Learning.

== Books ==
Pohlman has authored or co-authored three books.

- Published in 2008, Revealing Minds: Assessing to Understand and Support Struggling Learners (Jossey-Bass) is a hands-on guide for professionals who assess students facing learning challenges.
- Published in 2009, How Can My Kid Succeed in School? What Parents and Teachers Can Do to Conquer Learning Problems (Jossey-Bass) helps parents and educators to better understand the learning needs of children and adolescents and to select strategies for success.
- Published in 2010, Pohlman co-authored Schools for All Kinds of Minds: Boosting Student Success by Embracing Learning Variation (Jossey-Bass) with Mary-Dean Barringer and Michele Robinson; this book is for school leaders to help bring neurodevelopmental practice to classrooms.

In addition, Pohlman wrote a chapter entitled "Assessment of specific neurodevelopmental functions" published in Therapist's Guide to Learning and Attention Disorders (Academic) in 2003.

== Presentations and workshops ==
Pohlman has presented nationally and internationally. He presents and gives workshops for educators, professionals, and parents. Some of his most popular presentations include:

- Revealing Minds in Your Classroom (presented at the Learning and the Brain Conference in Cambridge, MA, St. Andrew's School in Barrington, RI, Copenhagen International School in Copenhagen, Denmark, and St. Johnsbury Academy in St. Johnsbury, VT)
- Neurodevelopmental Assessment (presented at the Center for Student Success in Durham, NC and All Kinds of Minds: Quest for Success in Geneva, Switzerland)
- Better Understanding Learning and Learners (presented at Behavioral Health Symposium 2011 in Charlotte, NC and 2010 Aspie Conference in Charlotte, NC)
- Attention Controls (presented at Promoting Student Success: Clinical Assessment and Management of Differences in Learning in Chapel Hill, NC, Durham Academy in Durham, NC, and the European Council of International Schools November Annual Conference in Nice, France)
- Memory Systems (presented at South Carolina Branch of the International Dyslexia Association – Fall Conference in Columbia, SC and Mental Health Association of Cleveland County in Shelby, NC)
- Educating All Kinds of Minds (presented at Teaching All of Your Students through Differentiated Instruction in Newton, MA and Winnetka Public Schools Summer Institute in Winnetka, IL)
- Management by Profile (presented at Teaching All of Your Students through Differentiated Instruction in Newton, MA, Malden Public Schools in Malden, MA, Mental Health Association of Cleveland County in Shelby, NC, NC Schools Attuned with Durham, Wake, and Orange County Public Schools, Promoting Student Success: Clinical Assessment and Management of Differences in Learning in Chapel Hill, NC, Durham Academy in Durham, NC, All Kinds of Minds: Quests for Success in Geneva, Switzerland, South Carolina Branch of the International Dyslexia Association – Fall Conference in Columbia, SC, North Carolina Dropout Prevention Association – Annual Conference in Wilmington, NC, and Job Corps Atlanta Region Academic-Vocational Conference in Atlanta, GA)
