= Copenhagen Lions =

Copenhagen-based ice hockey team

- City: Ørestad, Copenhagen
- League: 1.Division
- Founded: 2014
- Home arena: Ørestad Skøjtehal (capacity: 750)
- Colors
- Head coach: Martin Skygge
- Website: www.copenhagenlions.dk

The Copenhagen Lions are an ice hockey team in the second best league in Denmark. They are based in Ørestad, Copenhagen and they currently play in Ørestad Skøjtehal, which is located right next to Royal Arena. Lions is playing in the second best league in Denmark, 1.Division.

== History ==
Founded in 2014, they played their first season in the Danish third division, Division 2 Øst. Having achieved a 2nd place overall two years in a row, Copenhagen Lions were ready to make the next big move, and they were promoted by DIU (Danish Icehockey Union) to the second-best division in Danish icehockey, 1. Division as of 2016-17.

Following the promotion and the construction of the new arena in Copenhagen, Royal Arena, Copenhagen Lions were in 2015 granted a new smaller arena right next to the big arena. Ørestad Skøjtehal is also going to function as training facility for the upcoming 2018 IIHF World Championship, which is supposed to be played in Royal Arena.
