= 2022 Copenhagen mall shooting =

Mass shooting in Copenhagen, Denmark

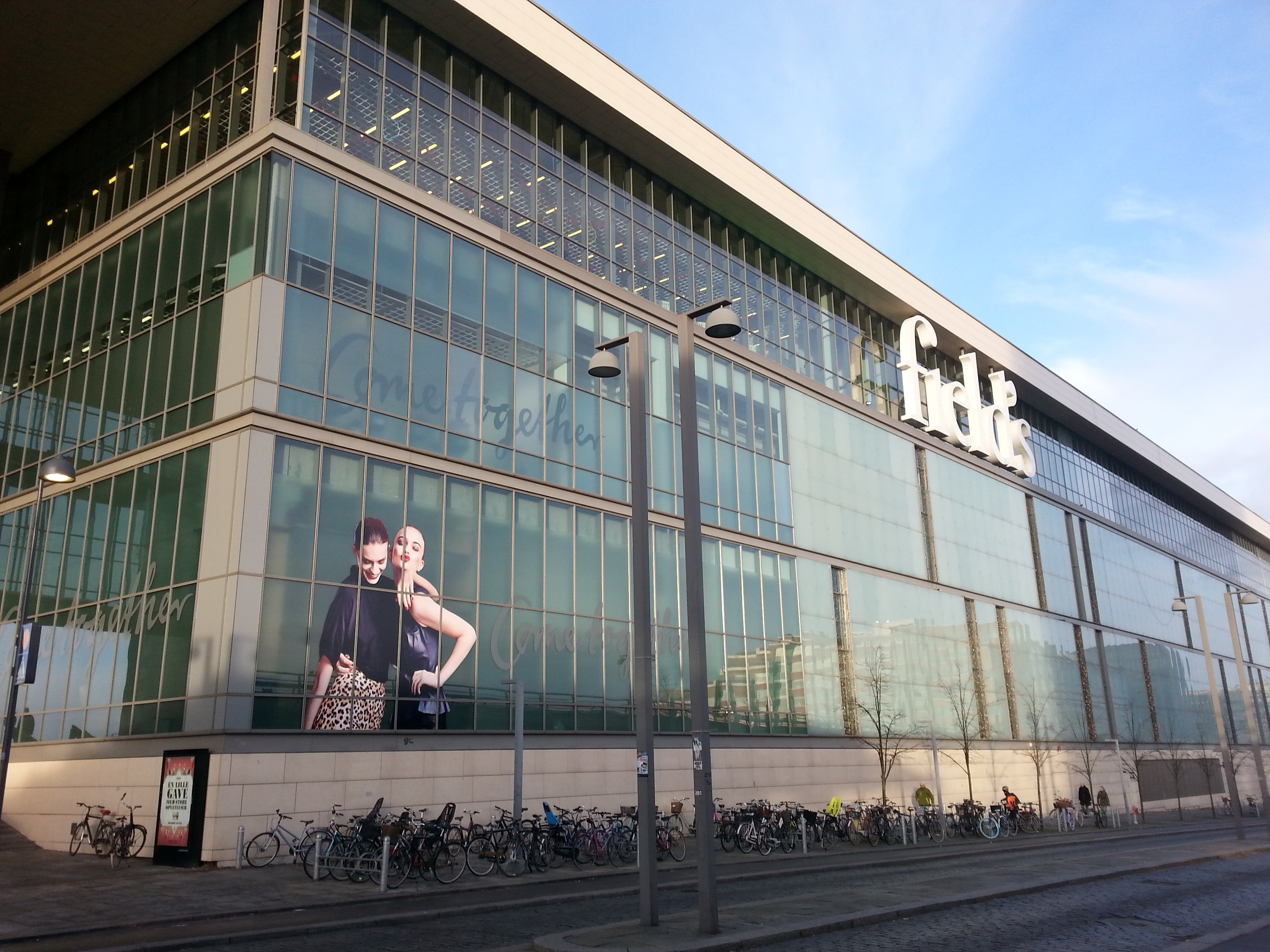

- 2022 Copenhagen mall shooting (Greater Copenhagen)
- Location: 55°37′49″N 12°34′40″E; Field's shopping mall, Ørestad, Copenhagen, Denmark
- Date: 3 July 2022; 17:33 – 17:48 (CEST UTC+02:00)
- Target: Shoppers
- Attack type: Mass shooting
- Weapons: SIG Sauer 200 STR match rifle; Walther P1 pistol (unused); Knife (unused)
- Deaths: 3
- Injuries: 27 (7 by gunfire)
- Perpetrator: Noah Esbensen
- Charges: 3 murders and 7 attempted murders
- Verdict: Not guilty by reason of insanity

On 3 July 2022, a man opened fire at the Field's shopping mall in Copenhagen, Denmark, killing three people and critically wounding four others. The perpetrator, 22-year-old Noah Esbensen, was arrested after the shooting; he had a history of contact with the psychiatric healthcare system He was charged with three murders and seven attempted murders, but was later found innocent by reason of insanity. The mass shooting was the first in Denmark since a gang-related shooting in the same city in 2016.

== Shooting ==
Earlier in the day, the shooter, Noah Esbensen, took a subway to the Field's shopping mall located in Ørestad, a developing city area on Amager in Copenhagen. He intended to socialize in anticipation of a visit from his brother. Esbensen walked around the mall and called his brother at 14:11 before leaving. He considered buying a ticket to watch a movie, but he ultimately did not purchase one and left the shopping mall on a subway. In his apartment, Esbensen decided to open fire at the mall at the last minute.

At 16:58, Esbensen reentered the mall through an external staircase to the mall's movie theater on the second floor while carrying a shoulder-bag and case containing magazines, his father's rifle, a handgun, a knife, clothing, earbuds, and sunglasses. He walked into the theater's restroom and sat in the toilet stall. While in the toilet stall, Esbensen started loading his weapons and changed his clothes. He also got on his phone to look at social media and to look up suspected serial killer Wayne Williams and a guitar shop. When he tried loading the handgun, Esbensen was unable to get it to work due to overloading the weapon. At 17:14, while in the toilet stall, he called a psychiatrist's office but only got an automated message. He stayed silent on the other end for 16 minutes before hanging up. Immediately afterwards, he opened his YouTube app and started playing his "killer music" playlist. Esbensen put on his earbuds and left the restroom at 17:32:56, leaving behind one magazine for his rifle and the Walther P1 handgun on the floor of the toilet stall.

Immediately after leaving the restroom, Esbensen aimed at a 47-year-old Russian man who was with his two sons. He fired two shots at the man, hitting his left flank and right shoulder and killing him. A 17-year-old male employee stepped into the theater lobby to investigate the gunshots. Esbensen fired a shot at him, wounding the teen, then walked up to him and fired another shot at point-blank range into his head, killing him. He lowered his rifle briefly before aiming at an Afghan man, who was at a counter looking to buy candy for his daughter before watching Minions: The Rise of Gru with his family. Esbensen walked up close to the man and fired a shot, hitting the man's right shoulder. The man collapsed and crawled towards his distressed family. Esbensen then reloaded and ran out of the theater and into the main mall.

As Esbensen ran north, he came across a woman and started chasing her. He repeatedly pulled the trigger, but the gun did not fire due to an empty casing being loaded. Esbensen stopped running, discharged the casing, and loaded a new bullet. He then turned west and started chasing two girls while screaming. As he was running, he encountered a crowd of 20 more people running away from him. He fired a single shot at them and missed.

Esbensen eventually reached the mall's escalators, where several mallgoers were running down, and fired a single shot from the top. The shot hit a woman in the leg and shattered the glass. Esbensen fired another shot towards the top of the escalators, hitting the same woman in the shoulder and injuring another woman in the lower back. At some point, the escalators stopped, causing several people to fall to the bottom of the escalator, including the injured. Esbensen turned around and fired a shot at a woman in front of the Calvin Klein store, who had just stepped off the escalators. The bullet hit the woman before entering the body of another woman in front of her, injuring both. Esbensen turned back towards the escalators and fired a shot at the people lying down. He killed a 17-year-old teenage girl while injuring another person with the same shot. After he reloaded his rifle again, Esbensen shouted that no one in the mall was real and that "it's not real". A 13-year-old boy lying at the bottom of the escalators responded by repeatedly telling him that he was real and begging him not to shoot. Esbensen then ran up the escalators, sparing everyone.

Esbensen reached the third floor, where the food court was located. He fired a shot down the hall, hitting no one. A Swedish man looking for his family was walking near the sushi restaurant, unaware of Esbensen's presence. Esbensen fired a shot at him, hitting him in the stomach. The man briefly fell before walking out of the mall. Esbensen fired two more shots, hitting a window and the area near the restroom and the KFC, hitting no one. On the third floor, a man recorded Esbensen shouting and shouldering the rifle, before running away while screaming. Esbensen discharged a live round and loaded a new magazine to his rifle.

Esbensen ran down the same escalators he shot people on and ran out of the mall through an emergency exit at the back of the second floor. He walked down the emergency stairwell and fired a final shot outside the mall, hitting no one. Esbensen continued through the parking lot and finally stopped in front of a road. There, he got down to his knees and called his mother to apologize. While on the phone, police arrived and found Esbensen. He refused to listen to the officers' commands and shouted at them to kill him. Eventually, the officers pepper-sprayed and handcuffed him at 17:48.

Police received the first reports of a shooting at Field's at 17:37. A witness said the shooter seemed violent and angry, running and shouting. The rifle caliber has been speculated as either 6.5×55mm or .308 Winchester/7.62×51mm. According to police, the victims appear to have been random, with no indication that any particular group was targeted. The suspect was arrested by police eleven minutes after the shooting had been reported.

== Victims ==
Three people were killed, and four more were seriously wounded by gunfire. The dead are a 17-year-old Danish girl, a 17-year-old Danish boy and a 47-year-old Russian man who was living in Denmark.

Another 23 people received minor injuries, including three whose injuries were from stray gunfire, with the additional twenty individuals injured in the evacuation. The four seriously wounded victims are two Swedish citizens and two Danes.

== Perpetrator ==
A 22-year-old Danish man, later named as Noah Esbensen, was arrested in connection with the shooting. Born in 2000, Esbensen had a history of contact with the psychiatric healthcare system. When he started being under psychiatric care, he was diagnosed with schizophrenia and psychosis. He was given antipsychotics to treat the condition. However, psychiatric officials later ignored that diagnosis and treated him for autism. They lessened his dosage in the months leading up to the shooting. Months before the shooting, he had gained an interest in serial killers and mass shooters, citing Randy Stair, the perpetrator of the Eaton Township Weis Markets shooting, as one of his inspirations and claimed his videos "opened his eyes". He even disclosed this information to his psychiatrists. There was also evidence that Esbensen originally planned to shoot up a kindergarten near his apartment. Weeks before the shooting, Esbensen recorded two videos of himself talking about how he suffered from suicidal thoughts and his hatred for society. He would leave those two videos in a USB drive found in his apartment. He also left behind handwritten notes about killing people along with a floorplan and schedule of the kindergarten he planned to shoot up. At the trial, he explained that he thought the people he shot were «zombies».

A day before going to the mall, he uploaded videos on his Youtube channel where he simulated suicide with the rifle and pistol, and said that a specific type of psychiatric medication did not work. He also uploaded images of himself pretending to be dead with fake blood leaking out of his mouth two days before the shooting. When he entered the mall, he went directly to the restroom, and tried to get help from a suicide lifeline for 16 minutes, in vain. This was due to the lifeline not being active in the summer vacation, but they didn't close the line, resulting in callers being put in a non-existent line.

The firearms he used during the shooting and posed with in the videos were not owned by him and he did not have the required firearms license. They were legally owned by Esbensen's father, who was a member of a sport shooting club and was living in the same home as the shooter. In the videos posted by the shooter before the attack, a gun safe can be seen.

The accused has been charged with three murders and seven attempted murders. At a court hearing on 4 July 2022, he was remanded to a closed psychiatric unit. Prior to starting the hearing, the judge asked the media to leave the court room and held the hearing behind closed doors, with the accused remaining in custody until 28 July. The court banned the release of the victims' names. The defendant's trial began on 12 June 2023. On 5 July, the defendant was found insane and sentenced to detention in a secure medical facility.

== Aftermath ==
A temporary crisis center where people could receive psychiatric help was opened after the shooting.

Shortly after the shooting, the Danish royal family announced that a reception due to be hosted by Crown Prince Frederik to celebrate Denmark hosting the 2022 Tour de France had been cancelled. British singer Harry Styles cancelled a concert at the nearby Royal Arena scheduled later that evening.

A memorial held on 5 July 2022 at the Field's shopping mall was attended by thousands of people, the Prime Minister of Denmark Mette Frederiksen, Lord Mayor of Copenhagen Sophie Hæstorp Andersen, other senior political figures as well as Crown Prince Frederik and Prince Christian of Denmark. An additional tribute to the victims, in the form of a minute's silence, was observed at the Tour de France before the start of the fourth stage of the race on 5 July.

Prime Minister Frederiksen described the attack as cruel, said that she had the deepest sympathy with the victims and their families, and thanked the police and first aiders.
