= Ravnsbjerg Church =

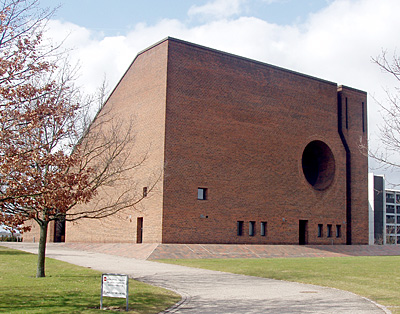
- Ravnsbjerg Church
- Ravnsbjerg Church
- 56°7′21.5″N 10°8′33.2″E
- Location: Grøfthøjparken 1, 8260 Viby
- Country: Denmark
- Denomination: Church of Denmark

History
- Status: Church

Architecture
- Architect(s): Christian Frederik Møller and C. F. Møller Architects
- Architectural type: Modern
- Completed: 1976

Specifications
- Materials: Brick

Administration
- Diocese: Diocese of Aarhus

Ravnsbjerg Church (Danish: Ravnsbjergkirken) is a modern church, built 1975–1976, located on the hill of Ravnsbjerg in Viby J. The church was designed by the Danish architect Christian Frederik Møller and his architectural firm C. F. Møller Architects as part of the new development of Aarhus in 1970, which resulted in the suburbs being moved out of the old city areas. The church's building materials are primarily red and brown bricks in combination with exposed bearing structures in wood. Sculptor Erik Heide created the church's wood and granite decorations.

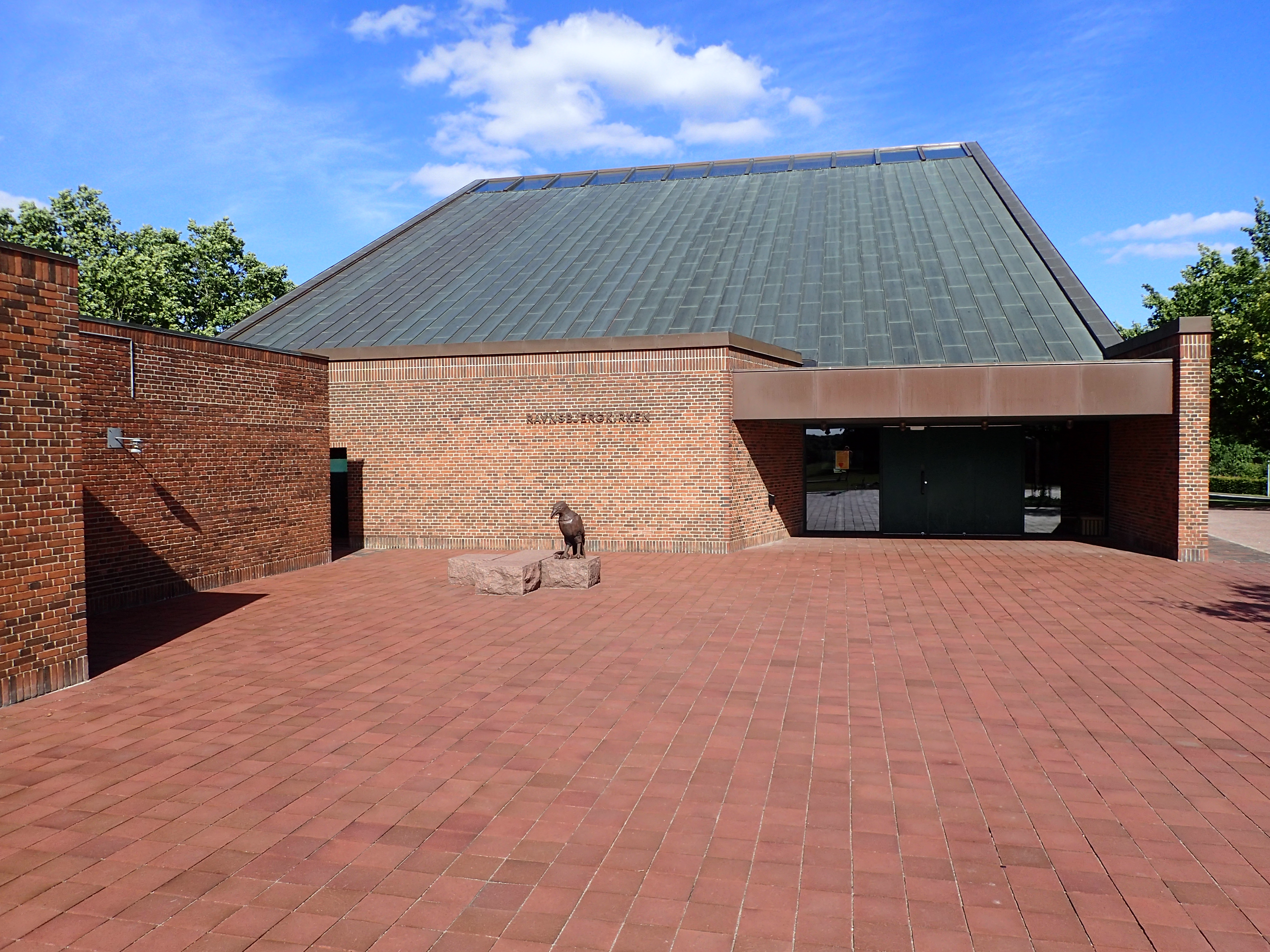
Front square and entrances

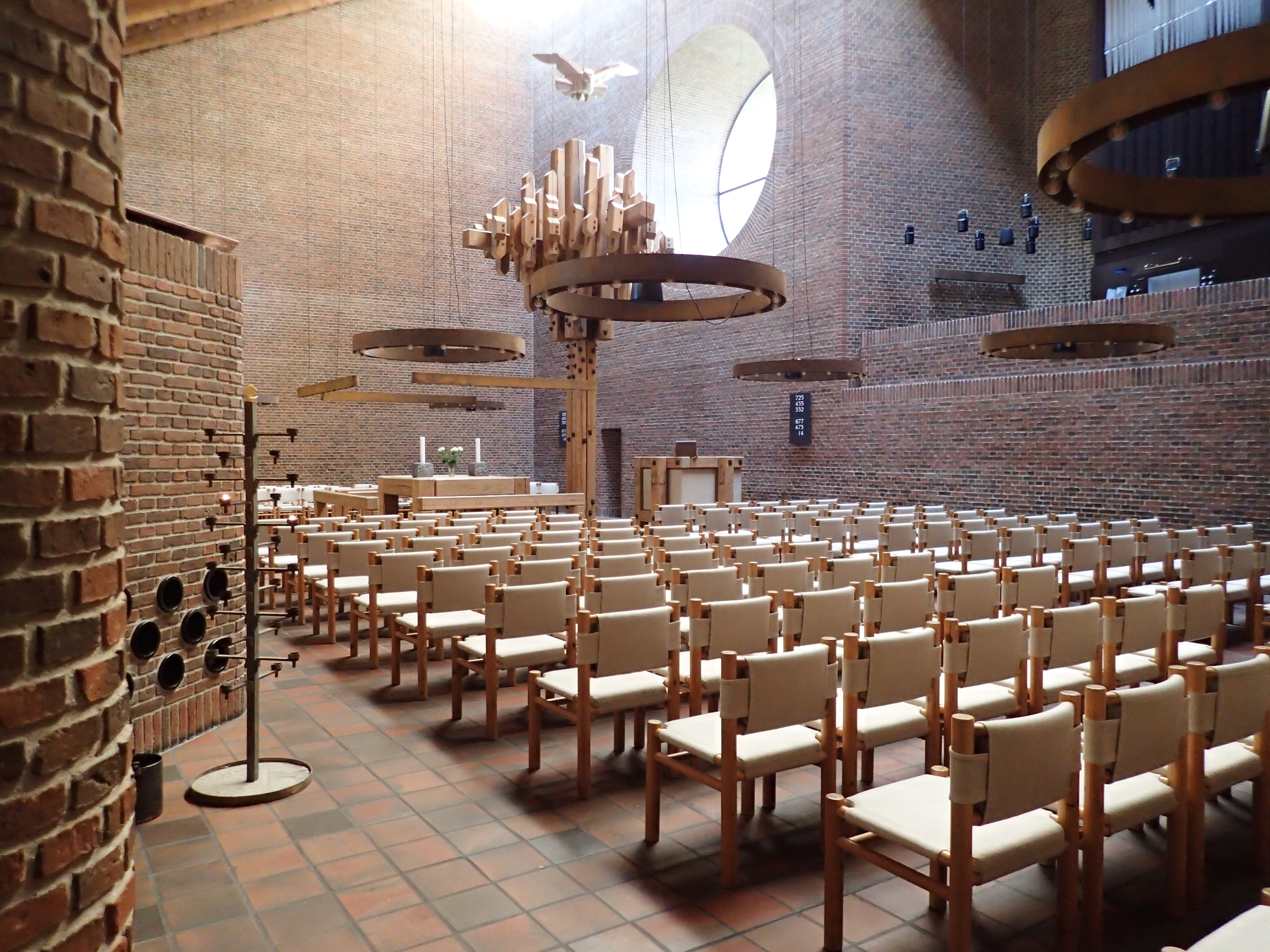
Church room

== See also ==
- List of churches in Aarhus
