= Aart Architects =

Danish architectural firm

AART architects is an architectural firm based in Aarhus, Denmark. The firm has been awarded for its work.

== Selected projects ==
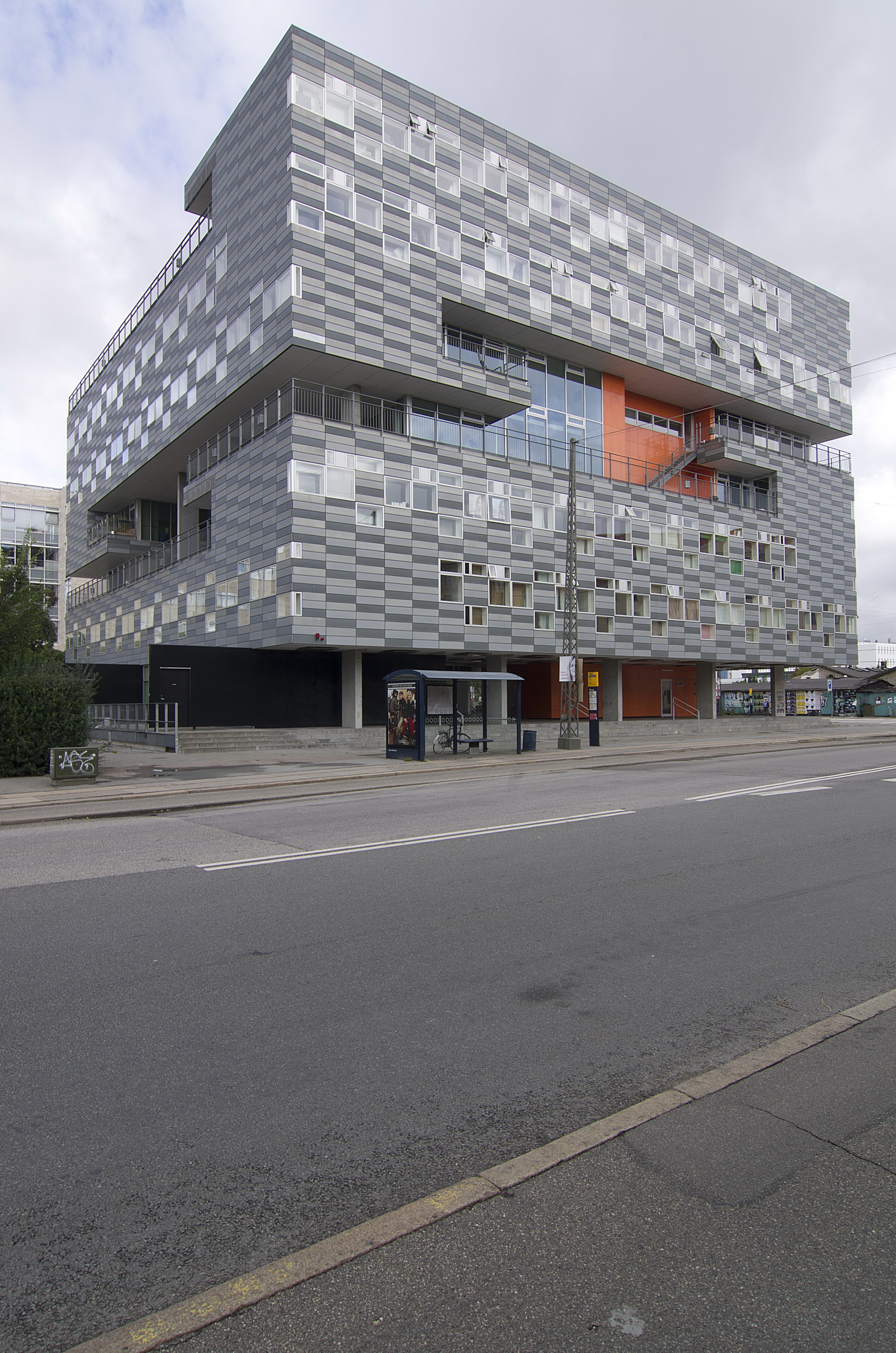
Bikuben Kollegium, Copenhagen

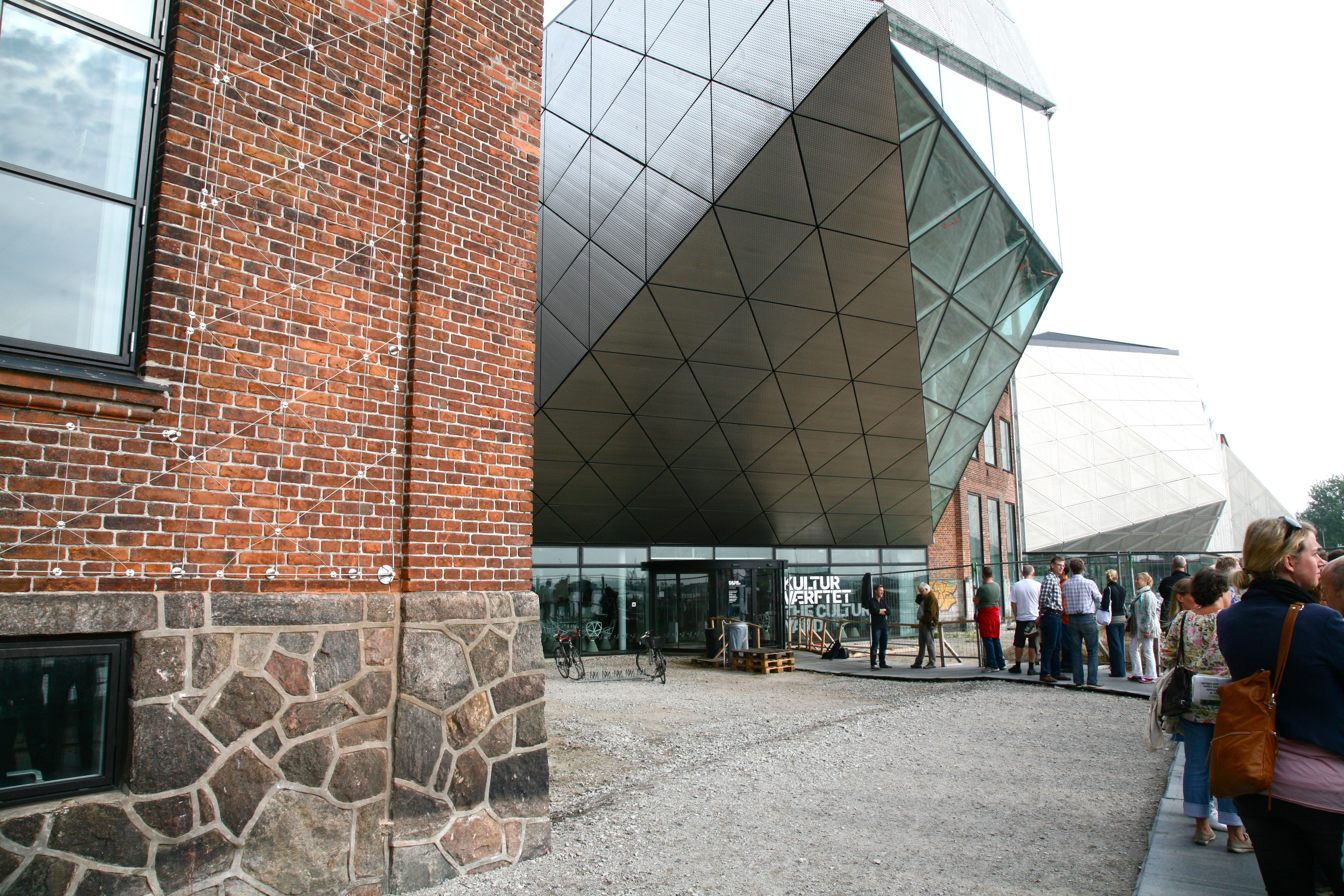
Kulturværftet, Helsingør

=== Completed ===
- Bikuben Kollegium, Copenhagen, Denmark
- Kulturværftet, Helsingør, Denmark (2011)
- Inspiria Science Centre, Norway

=== In progress ===
- Nautical School, Skagen, Denmark
- VUC, Haderslev, Denmark
- Østfold Hospital, Sarpsborg, Østfold, Norway
- Campus Park Skara, Skara, Sweden

== Awards ==
- 2012 Arnstein Arneberg Prize for Inspiria Science Centre, Norway
- 2012 Prime Property Award (Special Award) for Inspiria Science Centre
