= Anna Maria Indrio =

Italian-Danish architect (born 1943)

Anna Maria Indrio (born 11 June 1943 in Meina, Italy) is an Italian-Danish architect. She has designed several important cultural institutions and has played a leading role with C. F. Møller Architects in Copenhagen.

== Biography ==
Indrio first studied architecture in Rome (1962–65) and later at the Danish Academy's School of Architecture (1966–71) under Johan Otto von Spreckelsen. From 1979 to 1989, she shared a design studio with her husband Poul Jensen, participating in the design of Nørrevang Church in Slagelse (1989) which combines regional and Postmodern stylistic trends. In 1991, she became a partner in C. F. Møller's firm where she was the leading architect for the extension of Statens Museum for Kunst (1995–98) and for that of the Arken Museum of Modern Art in Ishøj (2007). She also designed an extension for London's Natural History Museum (2001) and the conversion of the Certosa di San Martino in Naples (2004)

Indrio is a member of several cultural organisations and has served on the boards of the Danish Building Research Institute (1996-2002) and the Federation of Danish Architects (1980–94). She is also a member of the Royal Danish Academy and has taught at the Aarhus School of Architecture.

== Awards ==
Indrio received a prize for her apartment building at Østerbrogade 105, Copenhagen (2007). She was awarded the Nykredit Architecture Prize in 2006. She became a knight of the Order of the Dannebrog in 2000 and of the Italian Order of the Star of Italian Solidarity in 2003. In 2010, she was awarded the Eckersberg Medal.
