= A. P. Møller School =

Public school in Schleswig, Germany

Coordinates: 54°31′28″N 9°33′16″E

- A. P. Møller Skolen
- Schleswig, Germany

Information
- Type: public Danish gymnasium in Germany
- Founded: 2008
- Director: Jens Verdoner
- Website: Official web site

The A. P. Møller School (Danish: A. P. Møller Skolen) is a Danish gymnasium in Schleswig (Danish: Slesvig), Southern Schleswig, Germany. Inaugurated in September 2008, it was a gift to the Danish minority of Southern Schleswig from the A. P. Møller Foundation. It is named after the Danish shipping magnate of the same name.

The school is situated at a scenic site, overlooking the Schlei Inlet. Built without traditional budget restraints to the design of C. F. Møller Architects, the school is noted for the high quality of its architecture and the materials used and won 2010 RIBA European Award for its design. Furniture include Arne Jacobsen sofas and chairs and artwork includes a light installation of the Solar System by Danish-Icelandic artist Olafur Eliasson.

The school is designed using principles from the Danish education system. As a result, the new school building comprises a variety of flexible spaces that can adapt to the self-driven and varied learning experiences that are encouraged.

== History ==
The A. P. Møller School is built on the former military barracks site "Auf der Freiheit" (Danish: På Friheden), just east of the Schleswig city centre.

== Building ==
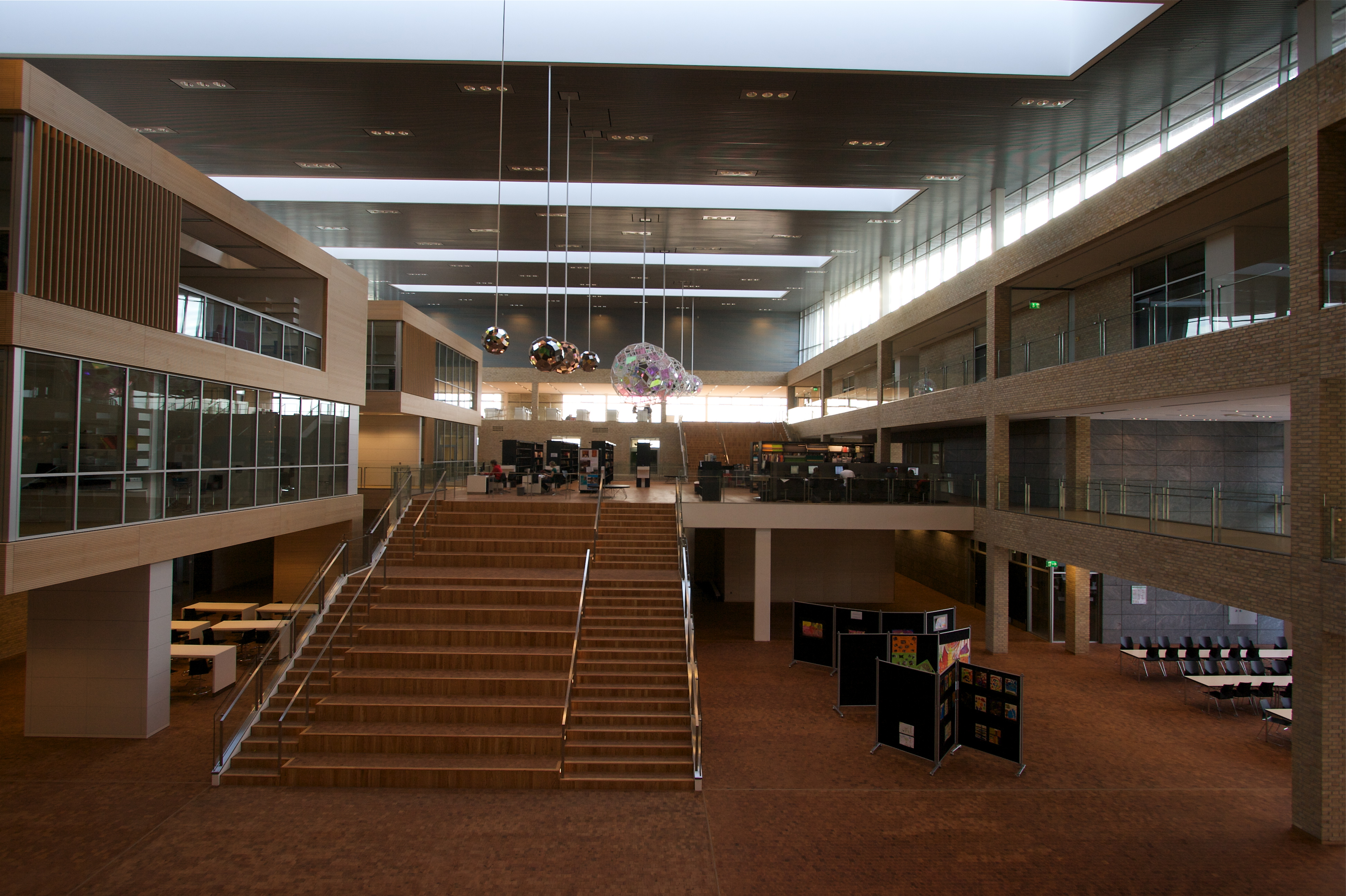
The atrium

The A. P. Møller School is structured around two large, central toplit spaces, one containing common areas with a canteen, reception hall and knowledge centre on three storeys, and the other being a larger sports and multi-purpose hall with three arenas. Communal stairways double as an amphitheatre for a large, sloping copper roof connects these two spatial elements, with the masonry built in yellow bricks.

The school's physical location and design take a point of departure in the site's interaction with the town of Schleswig and Slien Fjord, as well as in the desire to create timeless architecture.

== Curriculum ==
The school teaches both Danish and German on a native-speaker level. All other topics are instructed in Danish.

== Awards ==
- 2010 RIBA European Award

Worldwide Brick Award 2010

Finalist for BDA Architectureprice Große Nike 2009

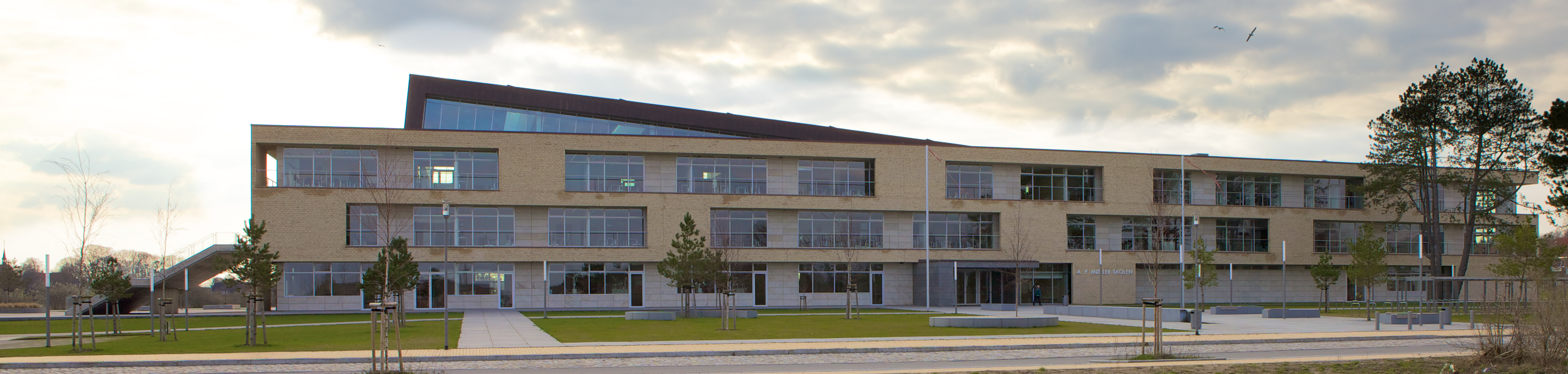
Gammel Dok seen from the south
