= Copenhagen International School =

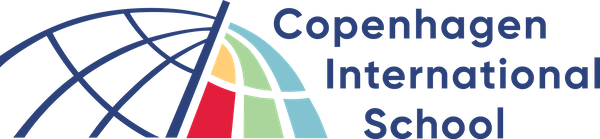

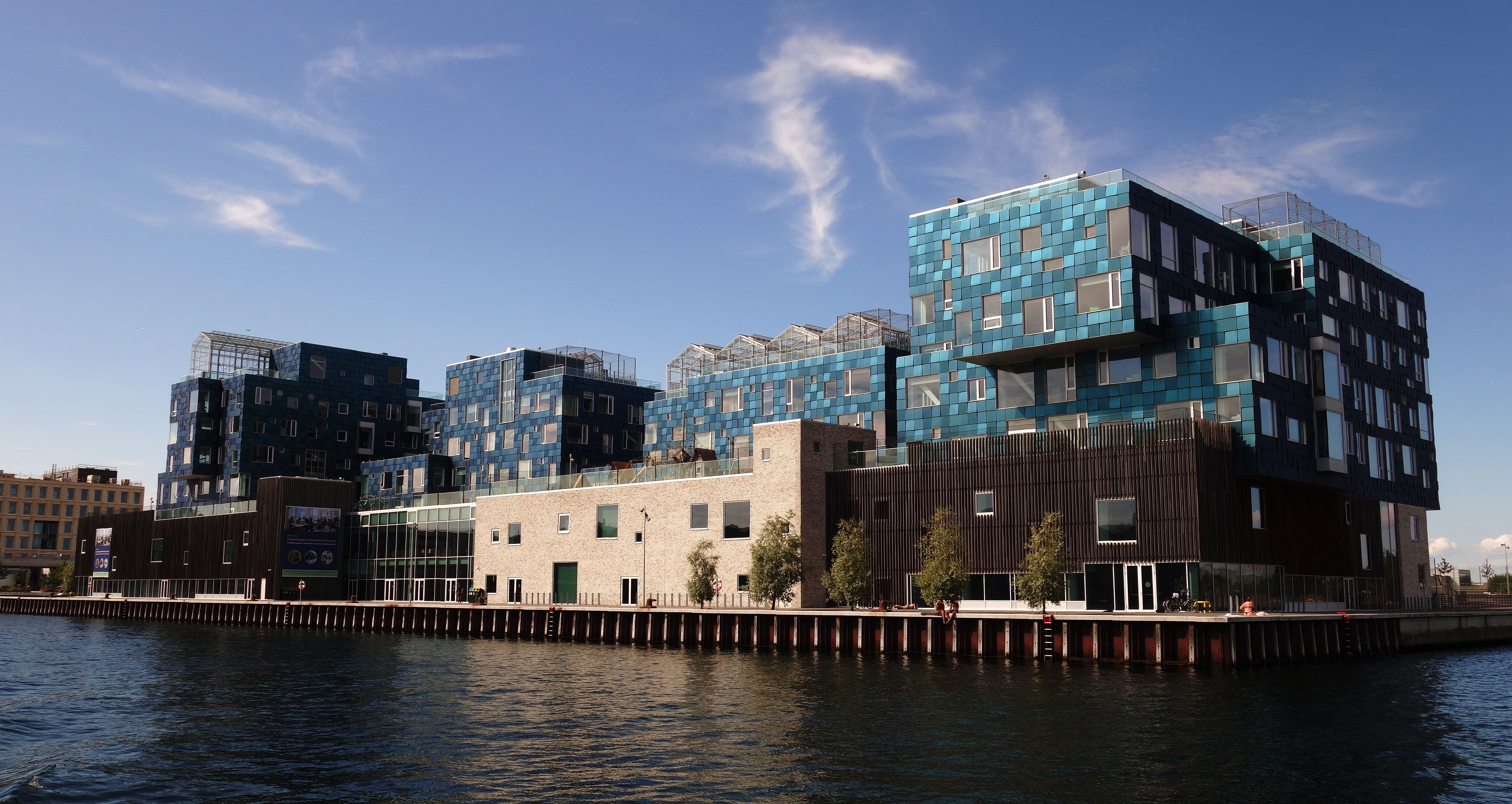
- CIS in 2022.

Location
- Levantkaj 4-14; Copenhagen, Nordhavn, 2150; Denmark; 55.712148°N 12.598609°E

Information
- School type: Private
- Founded: 1963
- School number: IBO: 000004
- Director: Chris Andre
- Grades: Pre K - 12
- Gender: Co-Ed
- Enrolment: 900
- Language: English
- Athletics: NECIS, DISNAC
- Mascot: Hawk
- Website: copenhageninternational.school

Copenhagen International School (CIS) is an international, co-educational day school located in the Copenhagen metropolitan area, Denmark. It has around 930 students of over 80 nationalities. English is the primary language of instruction. CIS offers an educational program from pre-kindergarten through grade 12 for students of all nationalities. The school year comprises four quarters, from mid-August through mid-June. Copenhagen International School is designed by C.F. Møller Architects.

== Academics ==
The school is authorized to deliver the continuum of the three International Baccalaureate curriculum programs: the IB Primary Years Program (Pre-K to Grade 5) followed by the IB Middle Years Program (Grades 6-10) and the International Baccalaureate Diploma Program (Grades 11 & 12). Instruction is in English. The curriculum covers language and literature (English), mathematics, science, social studies, P.E., technology, art, music and drama. Danish is required in grades 1 to 9. French, German and Spanish are offered as foreign languages starting in grade 6.

Subjects offered for the IB Diploma include:

- English A1/A2 HL/SL
- Danish A1 HL/SL
- any other language as A1 Self-Taught SL
- French B HL/SL
- Spanish B HL/SL
- Danish B HL/SL
- German B HL/SL
- German Ab Initio SL
- Economics HL/SL
- History HL/SL
- Geography HL/SL
- Biology HL/SL
- Chemistry HL/SL
- Physics HL/SL
- Mathematics Applications & Interpretations HL/SL
- Mathematics Analysis & Approaches HL/SL
- Computer Science HL/SL
- Music HL/SL
- Theatre HL/SL
- Visual Arts HL/SL

The school also offers a two-week summer school programme for children aged 4–14 with activities centered on sports, English as a foreign language, or science classes. The summer programme is open to all children, and not restricted to CIS students.

== Alumni ==
Many CIS graduates have gained acceptances into leading colleges and universities primarily in the UK, US and Denmark. The school runs a university guidance and counseling service for all students. In recent years, graduates have attended universities including Oxford University, Cambridge University, University College London, Imperial College London, London School of Economics, University of St. Andrews, Durham University, Delft University of Technology, University of British Columbia, Copenhagen Business School, NYU, MIT, Stanford University, Harvard University, Yale University, and Princeton University.

== History ==
Copenhagen International School was founded in 1963 to serve the international community of Denmark. It was founded for twelve English-speaking pupils and expanded as more and more English-speaking families moved to Copenhagen. It is one of the seven founding schools of the International Baccalaureate program, having offered the program since 1968. Originally

In 2013, the School marked its 50th anniversary with a visit from Princess Benedikte. The school has closed the doors on its Hellerup and City High School campuses in December 2016 and moved to a new, architecturally renowned building in Orientkaj, Nordhavn.

== Accreditation ==
Accredited by the European Council of International Schools (ECIS), the New England Association of Schools and Colleges (NEASC), and the Council of International Schools (CoIS). CIS is a private non-profit organization recognized by the Danish Ministry of Education.

== Faculty ==
In the 2013–14 school year, there are 123 full-time and 22 part-time faculty members, made up of 45 U.S. citizens, 20 host-country nationals, and 80 third-country nationals.

== Athletics ==
Copenhagen International School is also a member of the Northwest European Council of International Schools (NECIS) which organizes yearly sports tournaments throughout North West Europe, for the age groups Under 12, Under 14, Junior Varsity, and Varsity in the sports Volleyball, Basketball, Soccer, Swimming, Rugby, Softball, Tennis and Track & Field. Recent achievements include the Junior Varsity Boys Rugby Team winning the Rugby Championships in 2008 and 2009 and the Varsity Rugby Team winning in 2010. It also had the school's varsity basketball team bringing back a first-place trophy from the NECIS tournament in 2010.
