= Grønjordskollegiet =

Coordinates: 55°39′15.5″N 12°35′30″E

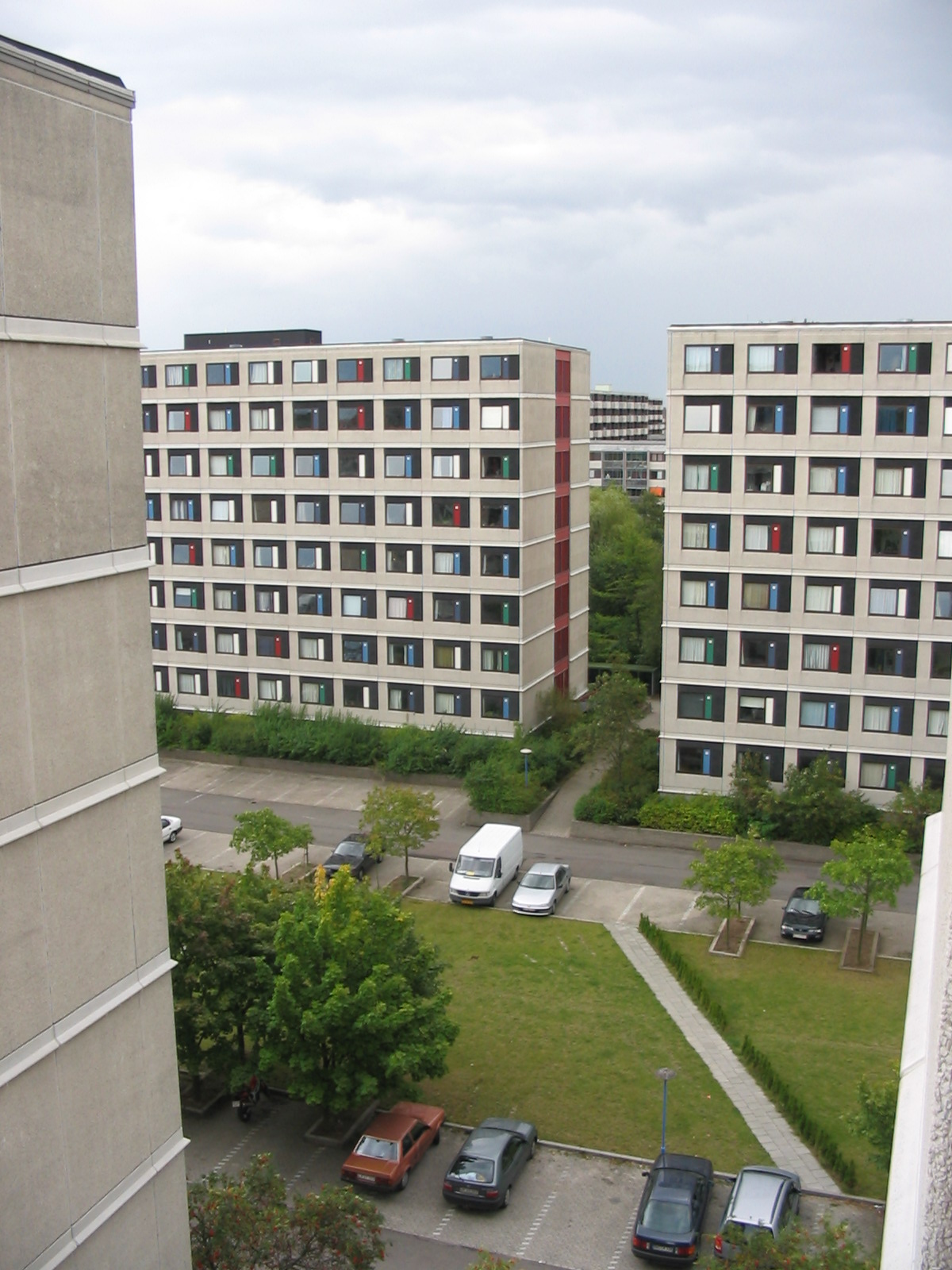
The view from the dorm.

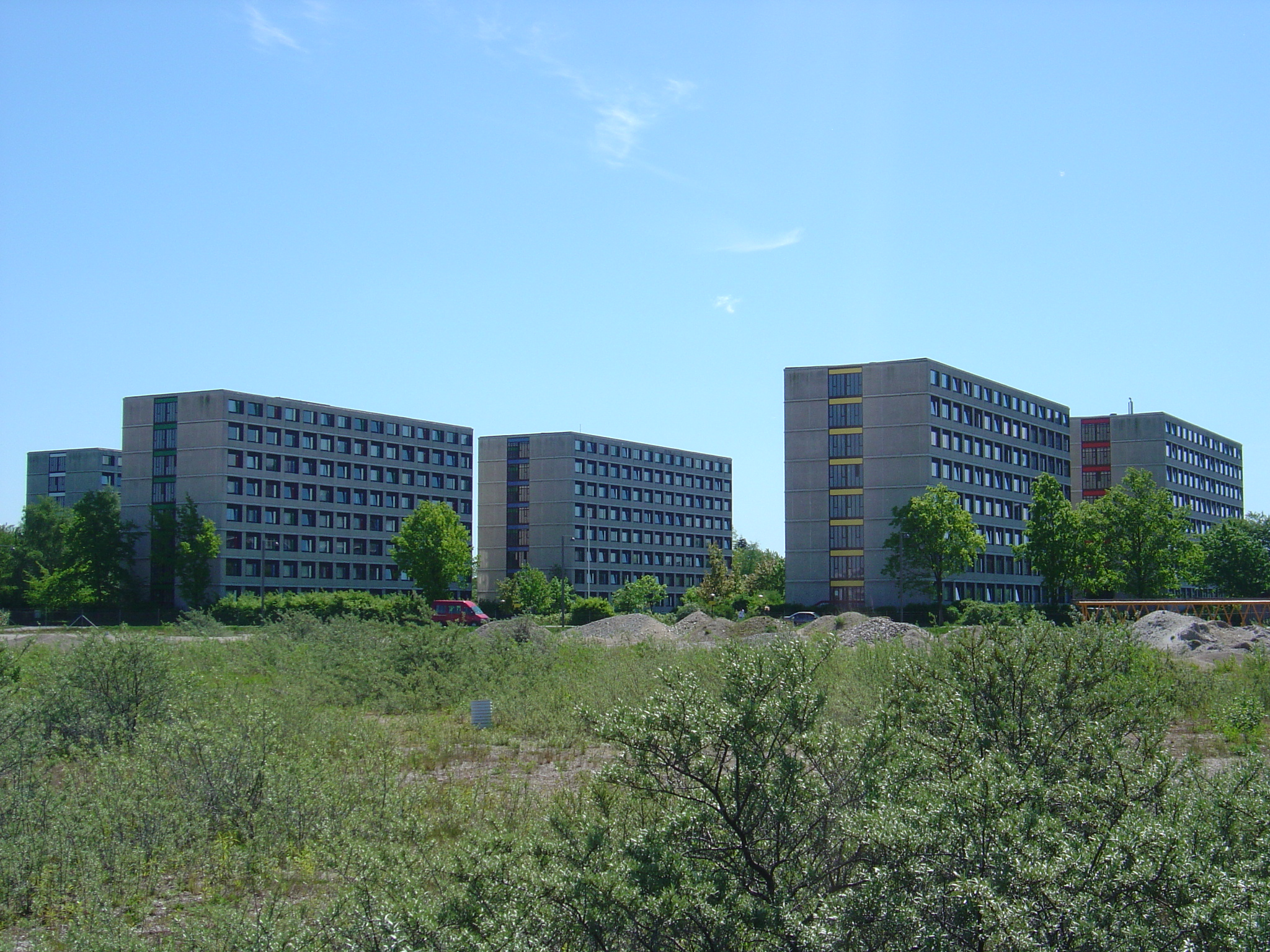
Grønjordskollegiet's five blocks of eight floors, as seen from the north-west

Grønjordskollegiet is a dormitory situated on Amager, Copenhagen, up to natural area Amager Fælled by Grønjordssøen. The dormitory is one of Denmark's largest with 920 rooms and approx. 1000 residents. The College consists of 5 blocks with 8 floors each with 21 single rooms and 2 double rooms.

The dormitory has a wide range of facilities for the residents, including a multi sports court, a gym, study areas, music rehearsal rooms and the dorm bar called Hatten Bar ran by Kollegianerforeningen.

== History ==
The dormitory was planned in the period 1969-1970. It was originally planned to build ten blocks with a total of 2,000 rooms, a common building and a supermarket. But when the first five blocks were completed in 1970, dormitory residents' resistance to build on the remaining green areas with additional blocks prevented the completion of the other planned blocks. At this time block 6 had been constructed, but not the fifth, and it was chosen to keep it that way. Today blocks 1, 2, 3, 4 and 6(!) are standing.

Cessation of expansion also meant that the planned common block was not included. This led to common facilities may be arranged in the college cellars and surrounding villas, the dormitory purchased. To the office were built a temporary barrack and college caretakers (known as De Blå Mænd) were anxious in a trailer behind the dormitory for their lunch room and changing room.

== Common Building ==
The temporary barracks stood for more than 30 years. Up through the 1980s and 1990s, several emerging that have entered a common building, but they never came to fruition, including because they wanted to build more housing at the same time - which caused many problems with the authorities.

Only in 2004 was considered final until a proposal that could be implemented. A pure commons building without dwellings, but with an administrative office, dressing room and lunch room, and a wide range of common facilities for residents including a gym. The building was designed by Nobel Architects A / S and is shaped like a mini-block, but is dominated by large windows and bright open spaces. The common house and administration is almost 900 squaremeters and opened in July 2006.

== Notable former residents ==
- Claus Hjort Frederiksen
- Niels Martinov
- Anna Castberg
- The East German spy Rudolf Samiecs (a.k.a. Jörg Meyer)
