= Ørestad =

Coordinates: 55°37.7′N 12°34.6′E

- Neighborhood of Copenhagen
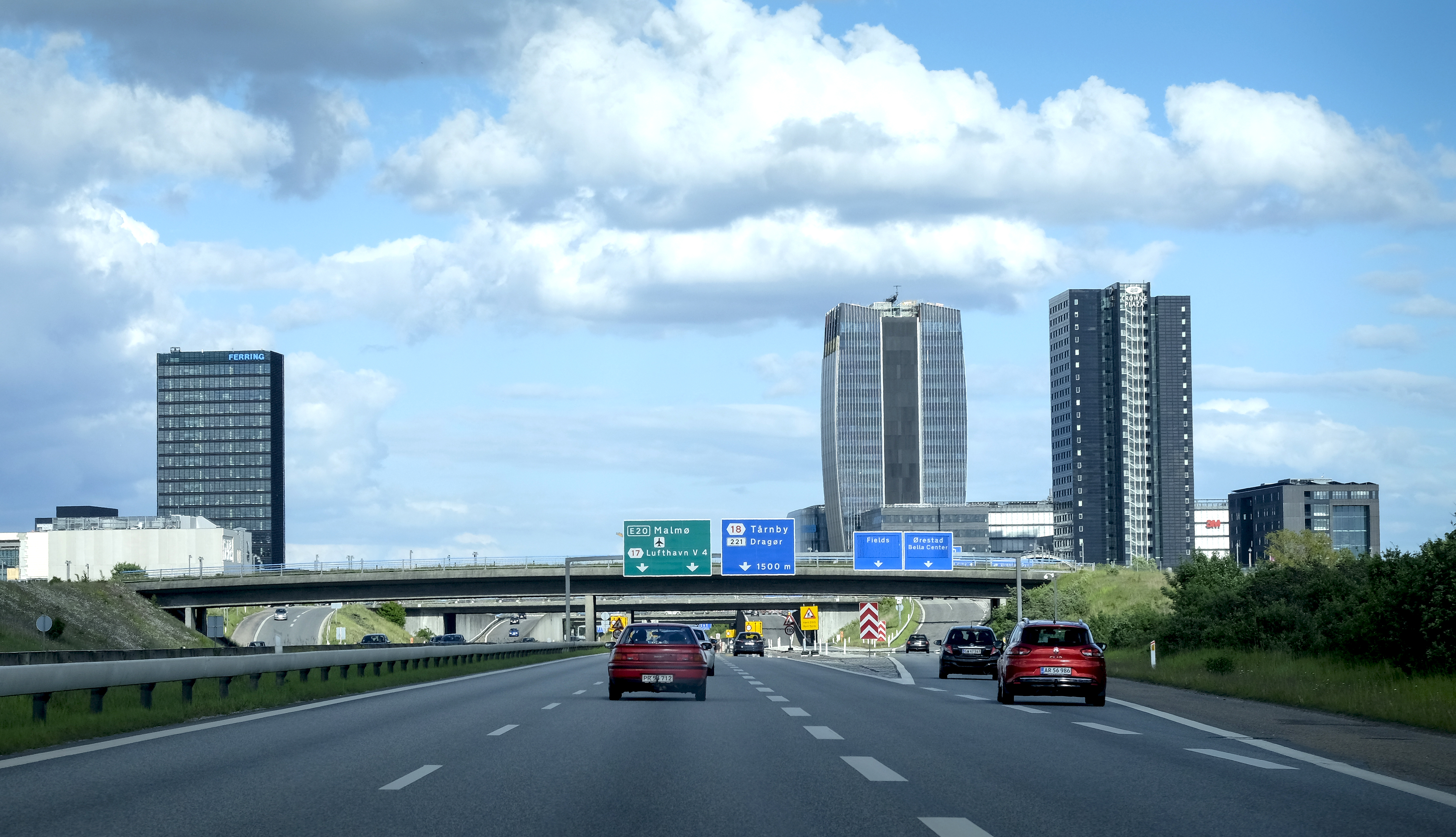
- Developing skyline of Ørestad
- Interactive map of Ørestad
- Country: Denmark
- Region: Capital Region
- Municipality: Copenhagen
- District: Amager Vest

Area
  - Total: 3.1 km^{2} (1.2 sq mi)

Population (2020)
  - Total: 21,400
  - Density: 6,903/km^{2} (17,880/sq mi)

Ørestad (Danish pronunciation: [ˈøːɐˌstæð]) is a developing city area in Copenhagen, Denmark, on the island of Amager.

The area was developed using the new town concept, closely linked with the M1 line of the Copenhagen Metro. Economically, income for the plan would be generated by selling the public-owned, unused land for development, thus financing the construction of the metro, and conversely, metro access was deemed necessary for making development attractive.

While the metro is the primary public transport access, the area is also served by the Øresund Line between Copenhagen and Malmö, the motorway E20 and close to Copenhagen Airport.

Ørestad was originally planned to consist of four districts, however only three are developed: Ørestad Nord, the unbuilt Amager Fælled area (which will remain a nature reserve), Ørestad City and Ørestad Syd. Therefore, Ørestad in reality consists of two areas detached from each other. The northernmost Ørestad Nord area is coherent with inner Copenhagen. Many Copenhageners will often only regard the outlying area, the two southern districts around Ørestad Station and Field's shopping centre, as Ørestad proper.

Ørestad is neighbouring the nature areas of Amager Common and Vestamager which consist mainly of land reclaimed in the first half of the 20th century, with wetlands, bushes and self-grown small woods. These recreational areas, as well as Ørestad itself and the surrounding island, are almost entirely flat.

Some notable institutions in Ørestad are the DR Village (headquarters of the national Danish broadcaster DR), Copenhagen Concert Hall designed by Jean Nouvel, Field's (the largest shopping mall in Denmark), Bella Center (the largest exhibition and conference center in Scandinavia) and Bella Sky Hotel, the largest hotel in Scandinavia. Of these, Bella Center existed before the concept of Ørestad.

== Planning aims and problems ==
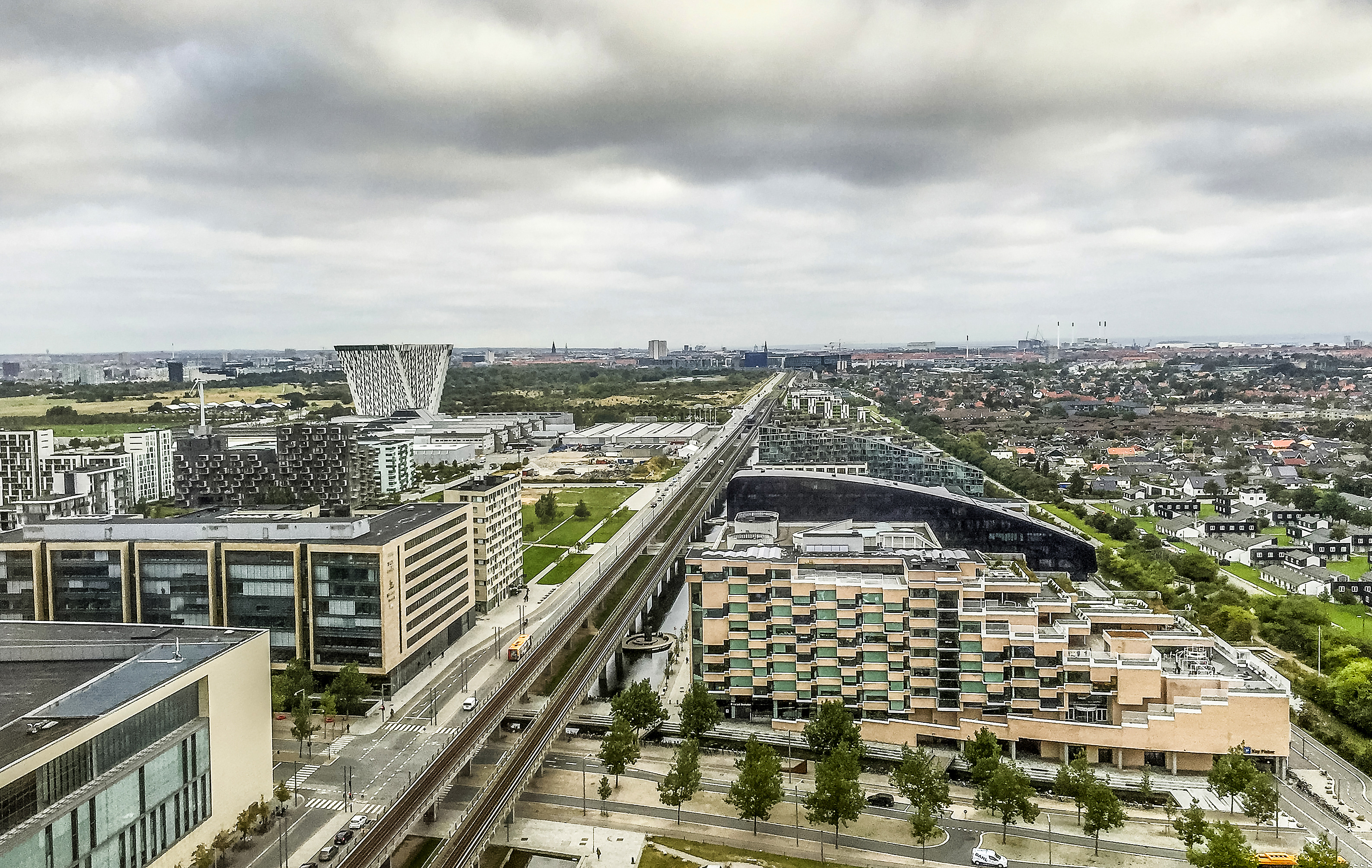
Panorama of Ørestad

Ørestad has a thoroughly planned infrastructure, which apart from the metro includes the Øresund Railway and motorway, with proximity to Copenhagen Airport and the nearby Øresund Bridge. The regional Oresundtrains reach Copenhagen Airport in six minutes, Copenhagen Central Station in seven, and take 29 minutes to Malmö Central Station. Ørestad has once been promoted as "the largest crossroad in Scandinavia".

However, Ørestad has also been criticized heavily for its modernist planning approach, focusing exclusively on real estate development and infrastructure connections. This has resulted in a square-grid street layout with wide, open spaces that are void of life and pedestrians. The plans for the area have been remade several times to account for such mistakes, but so far without much success.

When the area was planned it was expected that 20,000 people would live in Ørestad, 20,000 would study, and 80,000 people would be employed in the area. However, so far the area has attracted barely half of those numbers.

== Geography ==
The area of Ørestad is 3.1 square kilometres (1.2 square miles), being about 600 metres (2,000 feet) wide and 5 kilometres (3.1 miles) long. The central part of Ørestad, Ørestad City, is located 4.5 km (2.8 mi) west of Copenhagen Airport Kastrup and 5 km (3 mi) south of Copenhagen city centre.

Ørestad borders Islands Brygge to the north, Sundbyvester and Tårnby to the east, and the extensive Kalvebod Commons to the west.

== History ==
Historical population
Year	Pop.	±%
2004	100	—
2005	375	+275.0%
2006	1,739	+363.7%
2007	3,377	+94.2%
2008	5,410	+60.2%
2009	5,610	+3.7%
2010	6,142	+9.5%
2011	6,839	+11.3%
2012	7,445	+8.9%
2019	15,500	+108.2%
2020	21,400	+38.1%

The legislation for Ørestad was enacted in 1992 as a plan for developing unused areas paired with the construction of a metro system. These areas close to the centre of Copenhagen and the airport were publicly owned, and their sale would finance the long-wanted metro project, while the metro was likewise essential for offering an infrastructure in the area.

A metro had previously been contemplated through the densely populated, central axis of Amager, but the new plan would instead build two lines, aimed at developing the western (Ørestad) and eastern (Øresund coast) peripheries of Amager.

Ørestad Development Corporation (Ørestadsselskabet I/S) was founded March 11, 1993 to manage the growth of the district. The corporation is owned 55% by Copenhagen municipality and 45% by the Ministry of Finance. The development was expected to take 20 to 30 years at a cost of about €175 million, and it was expected that 20,000 people would live, 20,000 would study, and 80,000 people would be employed in the area.

At the beginning of 2008, 53% of the area had been sold.

The winning project of an international architectural competition held in 1994 revealed an overall masterplan for Ørestad, dividing the area into four districts. The Finnish design office APRT and Danish KHR Arkitekter established a joint-venture and presented a final plan in 1997.

The first office building was completed in 2001. The first residential buildings were completed three years later. Currently, there are more than 3000 flats as well as 192,100 m^{2} (2,067,747 sq ft) of office space in Ørestad. In addition, a total of 13 buildings are under construction.

On 3 July 2022, three people were killed in a shooting at Field's mall in the area.

== Areas in Ørestad ==
Since the turn of the millennium, a total of 65 buildings have been built, including more than 3000 flats, 71,400 m^{2} (768,543 sq ft) for educational use and 65,000 m^{2} (699,654 sq ft) of retail stores in the whole of Ørestad.

=== Ørestad North ===
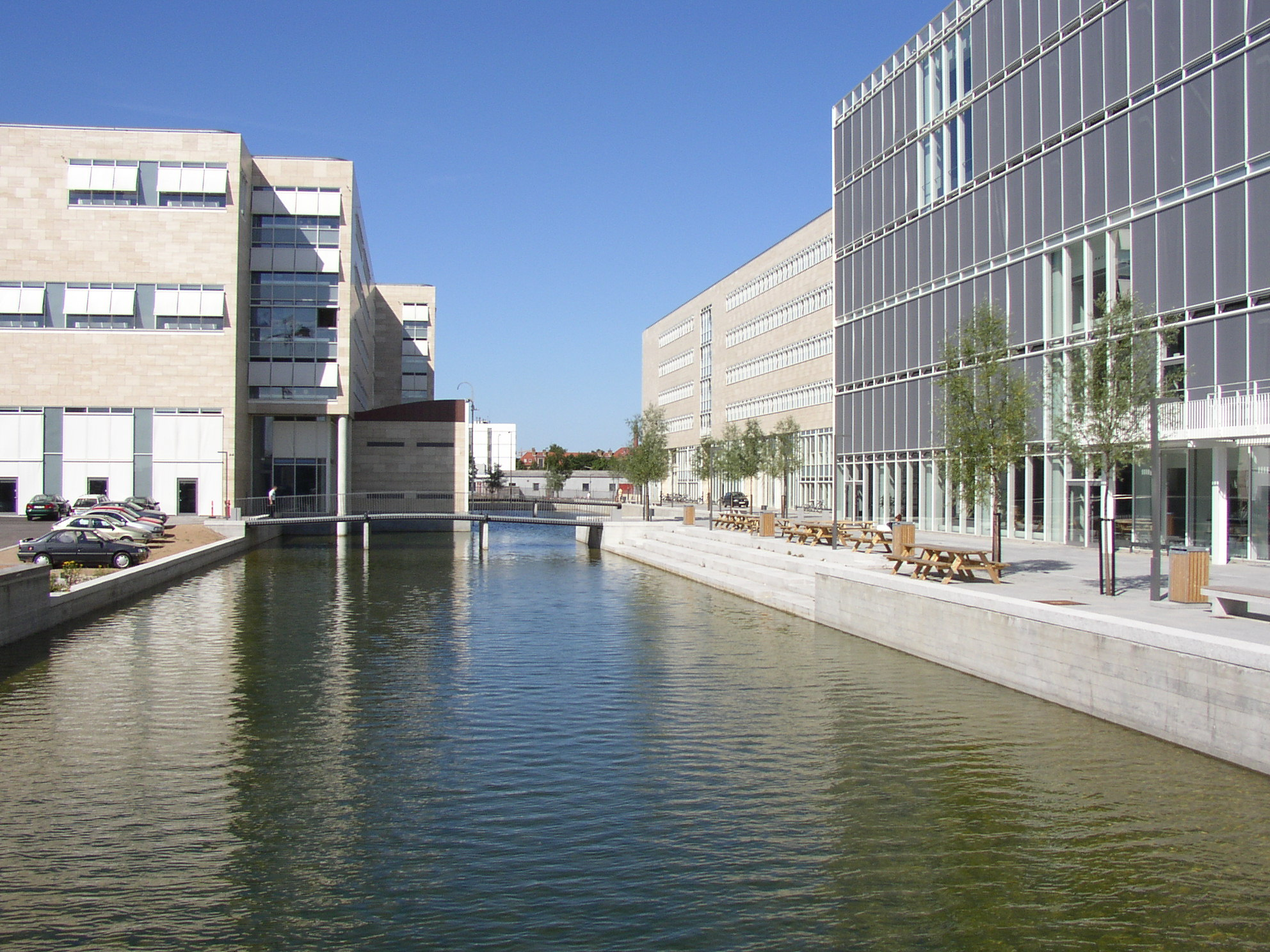
The Faculty of Humanities by the University Canal

Ørestad North is the most developed of the four areas of Ørestad, also being closest to central Copenhagen and blending into older urban areas. It is developed according to a masterplan by KHR Arkitekter from 1997 around a central "village green", the Landscape Canal and the north-south-oriented University Canal.

Major institutions in the area include the DR Byen, which includes the Copenhagen Concert Hall, and several educational facilities such as the IT University of Copenhagen. The Humanist Faculty of the University of Copenhagen existed in this area since the 1970s, but was rebuilt and expanded as the South Campus, now forming the extreme northern end of Ørestad. There are around 1,000 residential units in Ørestad North, half which are student housing in Tietgenkollegiet and Bikuben Kollegium.

=== Amager Fælled ===
Plans for development of the protected Amager Fælled district, west of Sundby metro station, became controversial and were abandoned in 2017. Only a small strip east of the metro line has been built-up, but is officially not a part of Ørestad.

Thus, Ørestad consists of a northern and southern part, only bound together by Ørestad Boulevard and the metro line along the untouched Amager Fælled area.

A new plan of February 2021 stipulates a housing development project further west, around the current Danhostel Copenhagen Amager, north of Vejlands Allé. A prospective name for this area is Vejlands Kvarter. Environmental activists who oppose the project use the name Lærkesletten, "the Larch Plain".

=== Ørestad City ===
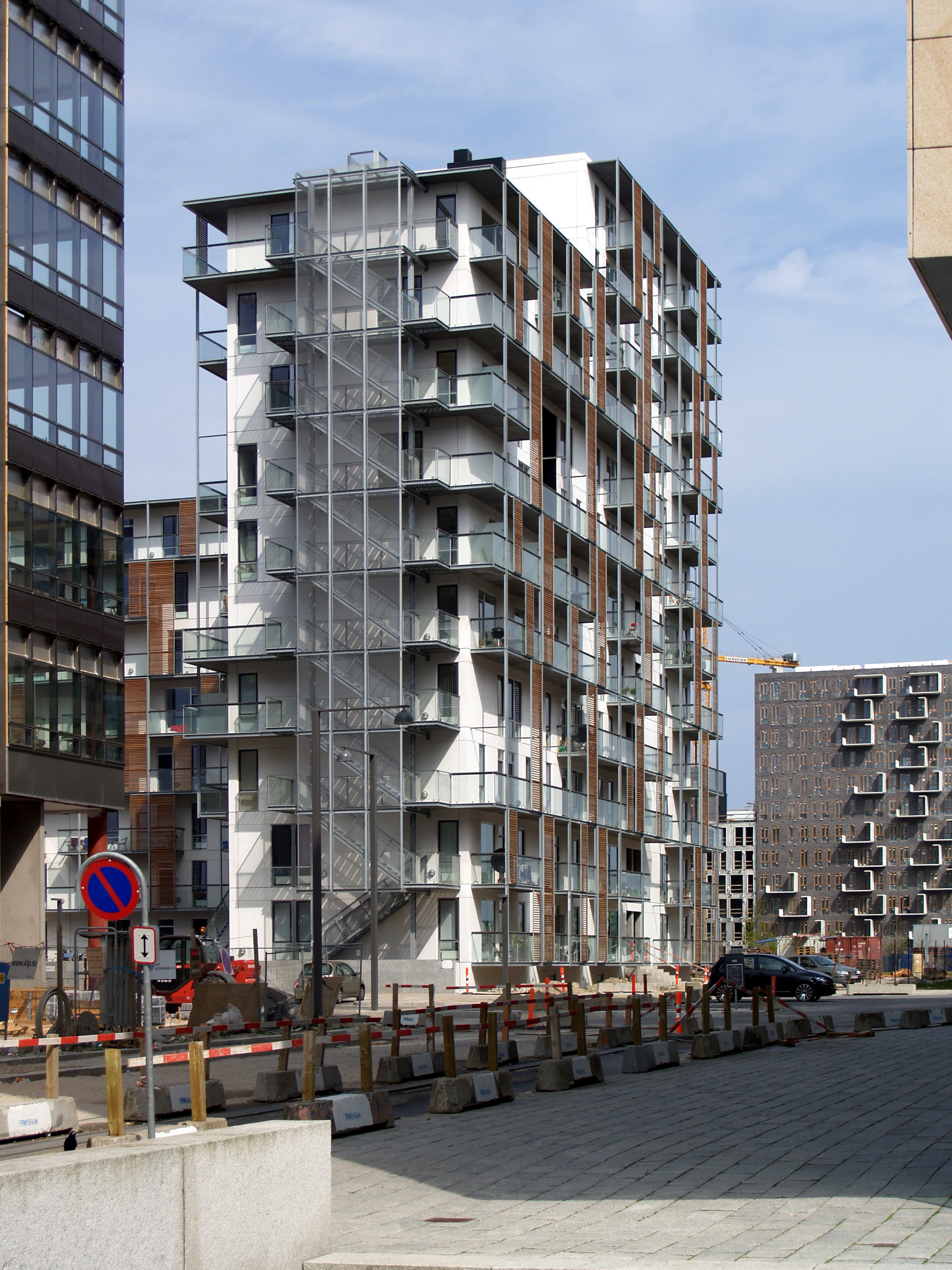
Residential building in Ørestad City, by Tegnestuen Vandkunsten architects

Ørestad City is the area in Ørestad which has seen the most new construction since 2001 when the Ferring Tower was completed as the first building. The dominating features in the area include the new Field's shopping mall and the pre-existing Bella Center convention and exhibition center. In 2006, Daniel Libeskind created a master plan for the remaining area of Ørestad City, referred to as Ørestad Down Town, located between Field's and Center Boulevard. In 2009, the 709-room Cab Inn Metro Hotel was completed to the design of Libeskind as the first building in this project.

Ørestad City has seen considerable construction of residential buildings since 2003, most of which are centered around Byparken. The most distinctive residential buildings in the area are the VM Houses and Mountain Dwellings by Bjarke Ingels and Julien De Smedt, while another noteworthy building is Ørestad College by 3XN.

=== Ørestad South ===
Ørestad South is dominated by large-scale commercial buildings in the northern part and upscale residential developments in the southern part. A new headquarters for international consulting firm Ramboll and the Crowne Plaza Copenhagen Towers hotel, part of the Copenhagen Towers development, are located just south of the Øresund highway. Both are designed by Dissing + Weitling. In the southernmost part of Ørestad South the 57,000 square kilometres (22,000 square miles) mixed-use building 8 House by Bjarke Ingels Group and the residential building Stævnen by Wilhelm Lauritzen Arkitekter are located.

== Future development ==
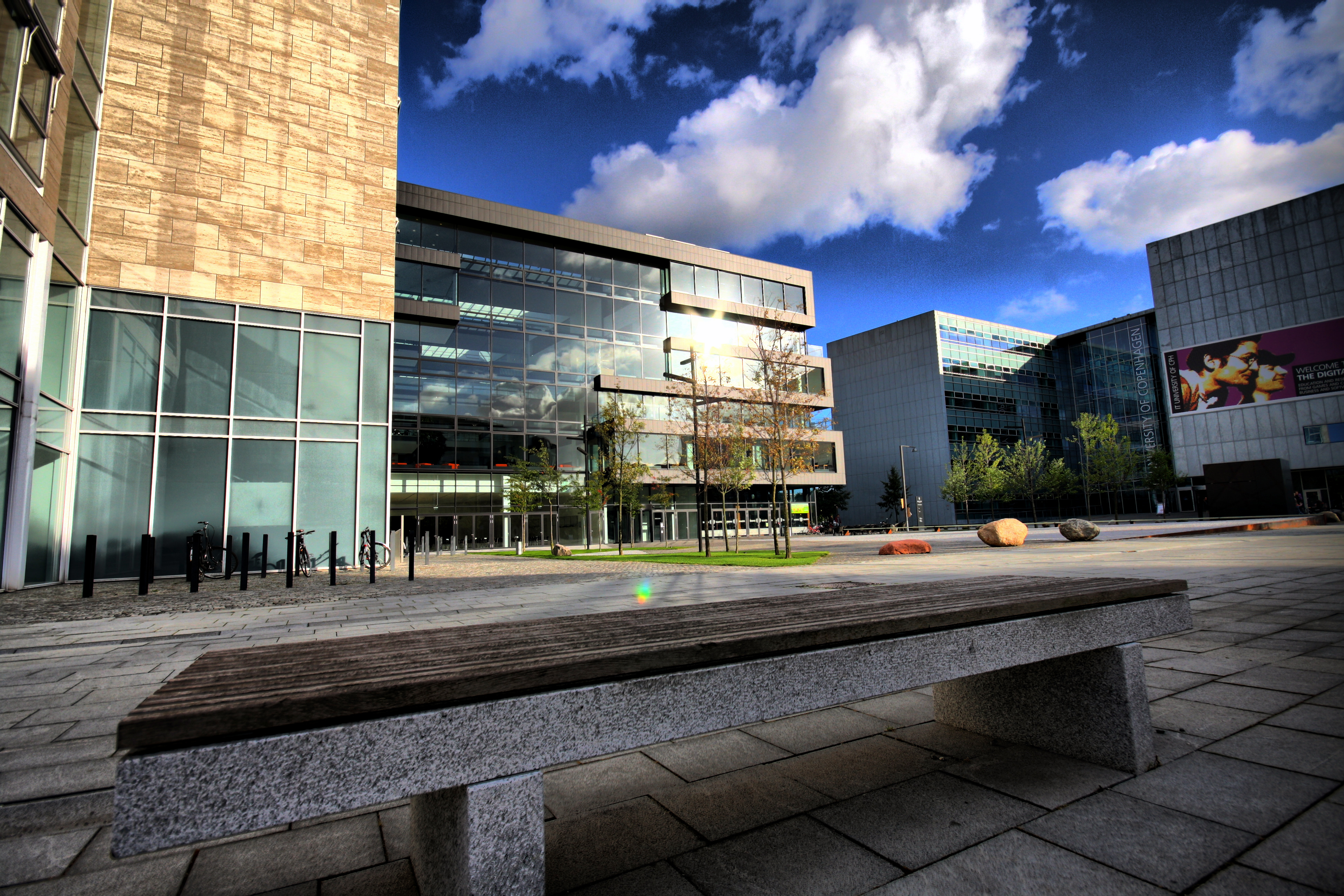
Mikado Plads in front of Mikado House, designed by Arkitema and completed in 2010

Eight building sites remain to be built in Ørestad City apart from the so-called Libeskind site situated west and south of Field's. The masterplan for this 187,000 m^{2} (2,012,851 sq ft) area was revealed in 2006 and suggests an all-curved complex consisting of some 11 office buildings including a 704-room Cab Inn Metro hotel and two 20-storey office/hotel buildings. There will be a central square and a partly glass-roofed arcade. Construction began late 2007 and will go on for 5–10 years.

The district plan for Ørestad South was approved in 2005. The overall master plan follows the initial design as seen in the winning proposal of 1997. Apart from the Copenhagen Towers complex adjacent to the motorway, two other master plans for two other complexes have been presented: One by Niels Torp for Ørestad Business Center and one by KHR arkitekter for The Hannemannsparken complex. All together these three complexes, situated just south of the motorway, will consist of some 285,000 m^{2} (3,067,714 sq ft) of office space. Construction of Copenhagen Towers started late 2007.

Royal Arena, a multi-use indoor arena, opened in 2016 and is located in Ørestad South. A new school is planned to open in 2015 as the Ørestad school reaches projected capacity. Other institutions are Ørestad Gymnasium and a branch of the Copenhagen municipal library.

== Transport ==
The intended main arteries from north to south through the four areas are the M1 metro line and the road Ørestads Boulevard. However, in the two northernmost areas, Ørestads Boulevard sees relatively little traffic due to its peripheral position. By renaming a part of former Artillerivej, Ørestads Boulevard has been extended to Amager Boulevard.

The thoroughfare Vejlands Allé, the Øresund motorway E20 and the Øresund railway cut east-west through Ørestad, the first one separating the districts of Amager Fælled and Ørestad City, the latter two separating Ørestad City and Ørestad Syd. To the east the airport is a few minutes away, and beyond it is the Sound Bridge, the railway and motorway tunnel/bridge link to Malmö.

Ørestad Station is situated at the border between Ørestad City and Ørestad Syd where the railway crosses the metro line. It is served by the metro as well as trains on the Øresund Line between Copenhagen Central Station, Copenhagen Airport and Malmö.

The metro has six stops in Ørestad, although some of these mainly serve adjacent areas: Islands Brygge and DR Byen in the Ørestad Nord district, Sundby in the Amager Fælled district, Bella Center and Ørestad in the Ørestad City district and Vestamager in the Ørestad Syd district.

In addition, bus lines serve the South Campus of the University, Bella Center, Ørestad City and Ørestad Syd. Bus stops in Ørestad City are along Ørestads Boulevard. Other buses include the east-west-going line 18, the sub-regional 500S which connects Ørestad with western and northern suburbs of Copenhagen, and local buses to the rest of the island of Amager.
