= C. F. Møller Architects =

Danish architectural firm

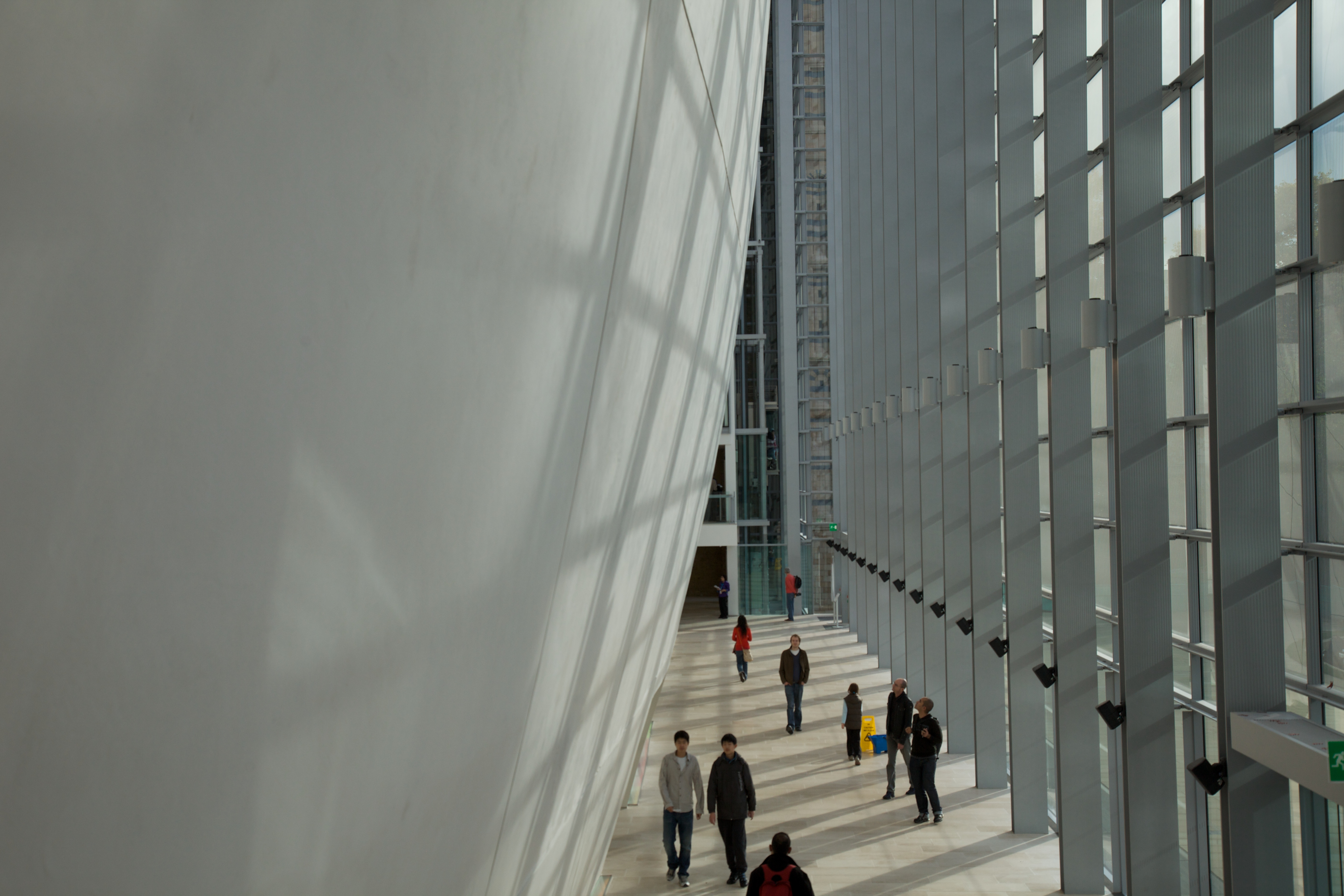
- The Darwin Centre II extension of the Natural History Museum in London

Practice information
- Key architects: Christian Dahle, Tom Danielsen, Klavs Hyttel, Michael Kruse, Marten Leringe, Mads Mandrup, Mads Møller, Klaus Toustrup, Julian Weyer, Lone Wiggers
- Founded: 1924
- Location: Aarhus, Denmark

Significant works and honors
- Buildings: Darwin Centre II; A. P. Møller School
- Awards: 2006 Nykredit Architecture Prize; 2010 RIBA European Award

Arkitektfirmaet C. F. Møller, internationally also known as C. F. Møller Architects, is an architectural firm based in Århus, Denmark. Founded in 1924 by C. F. Møller, it is today the largest architectural firm in Denmark based on number of employed architects. About half the revenue is earned outside Denmark. Besides the main office in Århus, the firm has offices in Copenhagen, Oslo, London and in 2007 it bought the Stockholm-based Swedish architectural practice Berg Arkitekter which is still operated under its own name.

Current projects include the largest hospital project ever to be built in Denmark in Århus, an extension of the National Maritime Museum in London and several highrise projects in Norway, Sweden and Denmark. C. F. Møller is also one of the 15 architecture practices that collaborated in the overall design of the Olympic Village for the 2012 Summer Olympics in London.

== Selected works ==
=== Completed ===
- Aarhus University, Aarhus, Denmark (first stage completed 1933)
- National Gallery extension, Copenhagen, Denmark (completed 1998)
- Field's Shopping Centre, Copenhagen (completed 2004)
- Bislett Stadium, Oslo, Norway (completed 2005)
- A. P. Møller School, Schleswig (Danish: Slesvig), Germany (completed 2008)
- Royal Academy of Music in Aarhus, an extension to the Aarhus Concert Hall, DK (completed 2007)
- Darwin Centre II, Natural History Museum, London, United Kingdom (completed 2008)
- New Ahus, Akershus University Hospital, Oslo, Norway (completed 2008)
- Copenhagen International School, Copenhagen, Denmark (completed 2016)
- Vitus Bering Innovation Park, Horsens, Denmark (2009)
- Emergency and infectious diseases unit, MAS University Hospital, Malmö (2010)
- Queen Ingrid's Hospital extension, Nuuk, Greenland (2011)
- Sogn & Fjordane Art Museum, Fjorde, Norway (2012)
- Sammy Ofer wing, National Maritime Museum, London, United Kingdom (2009–2011)
- Alvik Tower, Stockholm, Sweden (competition win 2009, completed 2014)
- Greenwich Peninsula Low Carbon Energy Center, London (completed 2016)
- Maersk Tower, Panum Institute, University of Copenhagen, Copenhagen (competition win 2010, completed 2017)
- Storstrøm Prison, Falster, Denmark (competition win 2010, completed 2017
- Point Hyllie, Malmö, Sweden (competition win 2006, completed 2019)
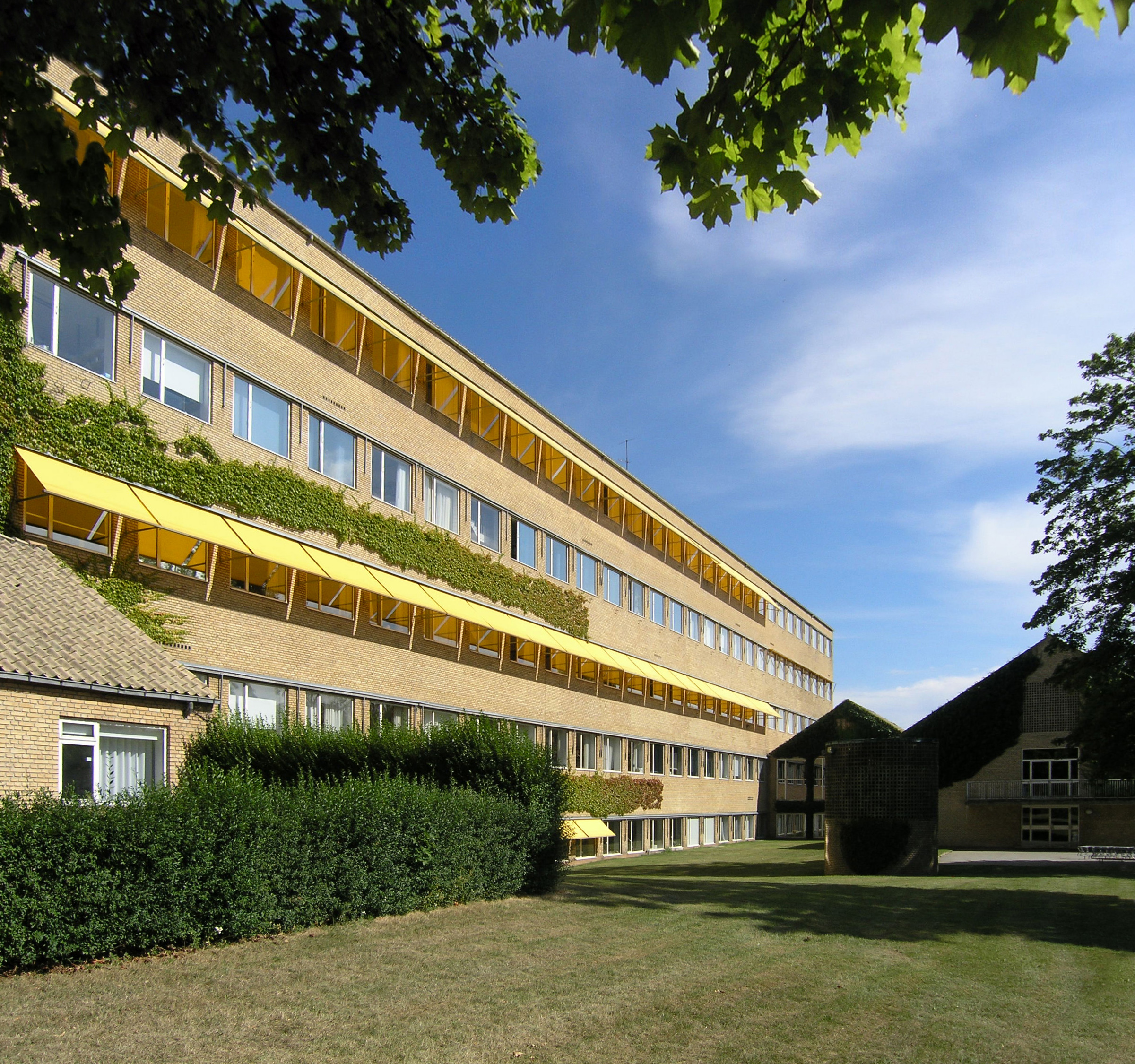
Aarhus University, The Bartholin Building (1971–74)

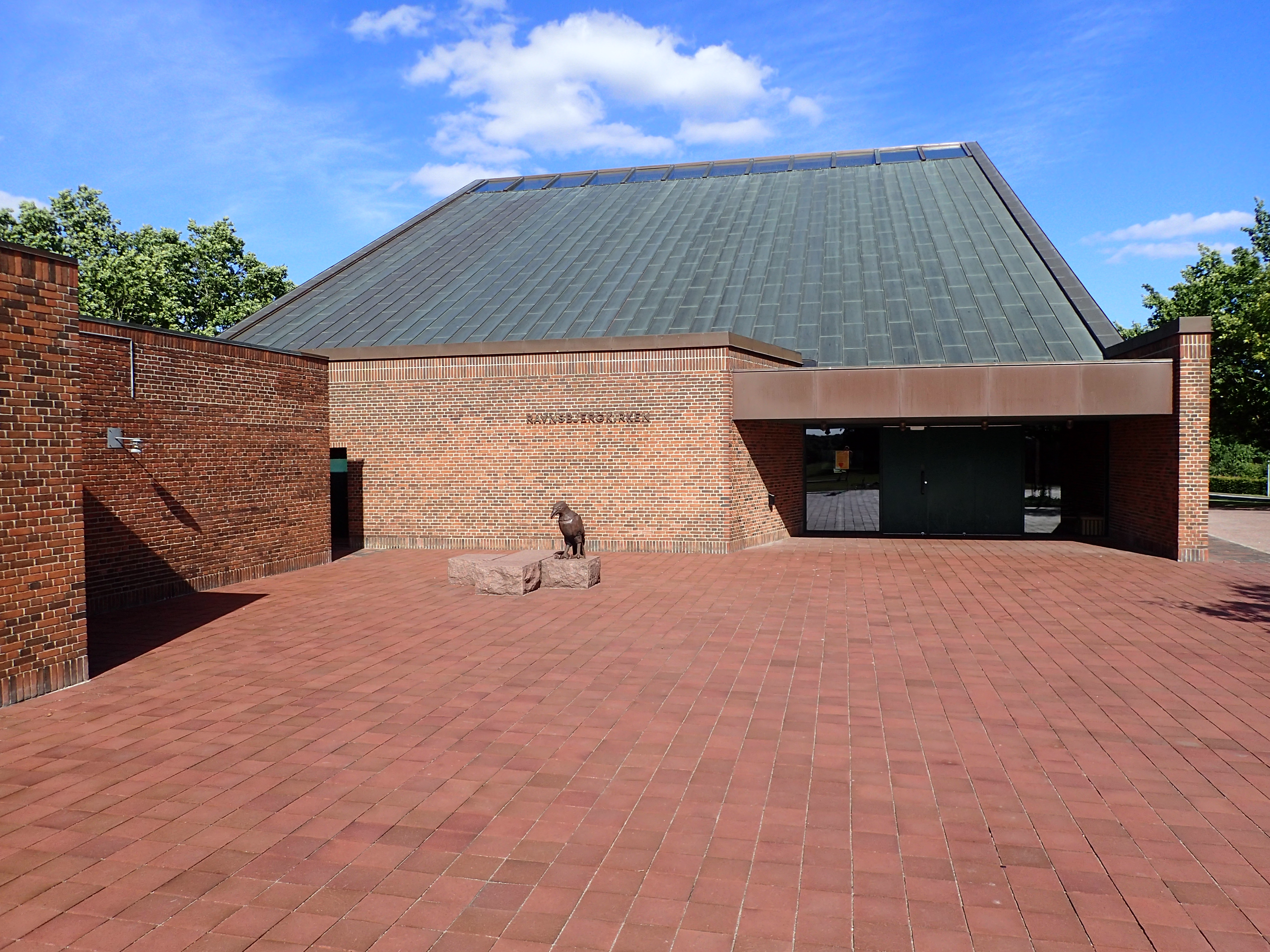
Ravnsbjerg Church (1976), Aarhus

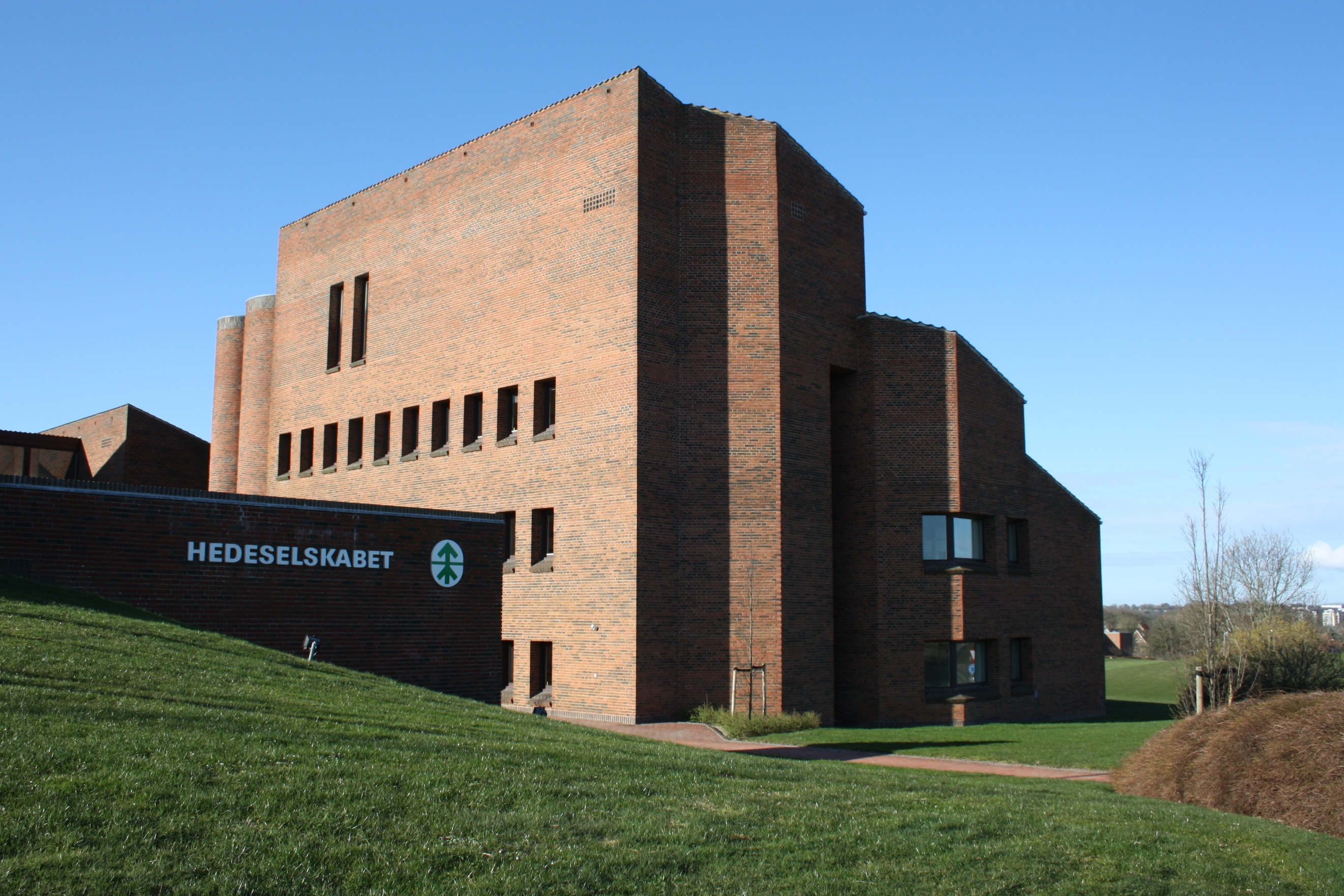
Hedeselskabet headquarters (1980), Viborg

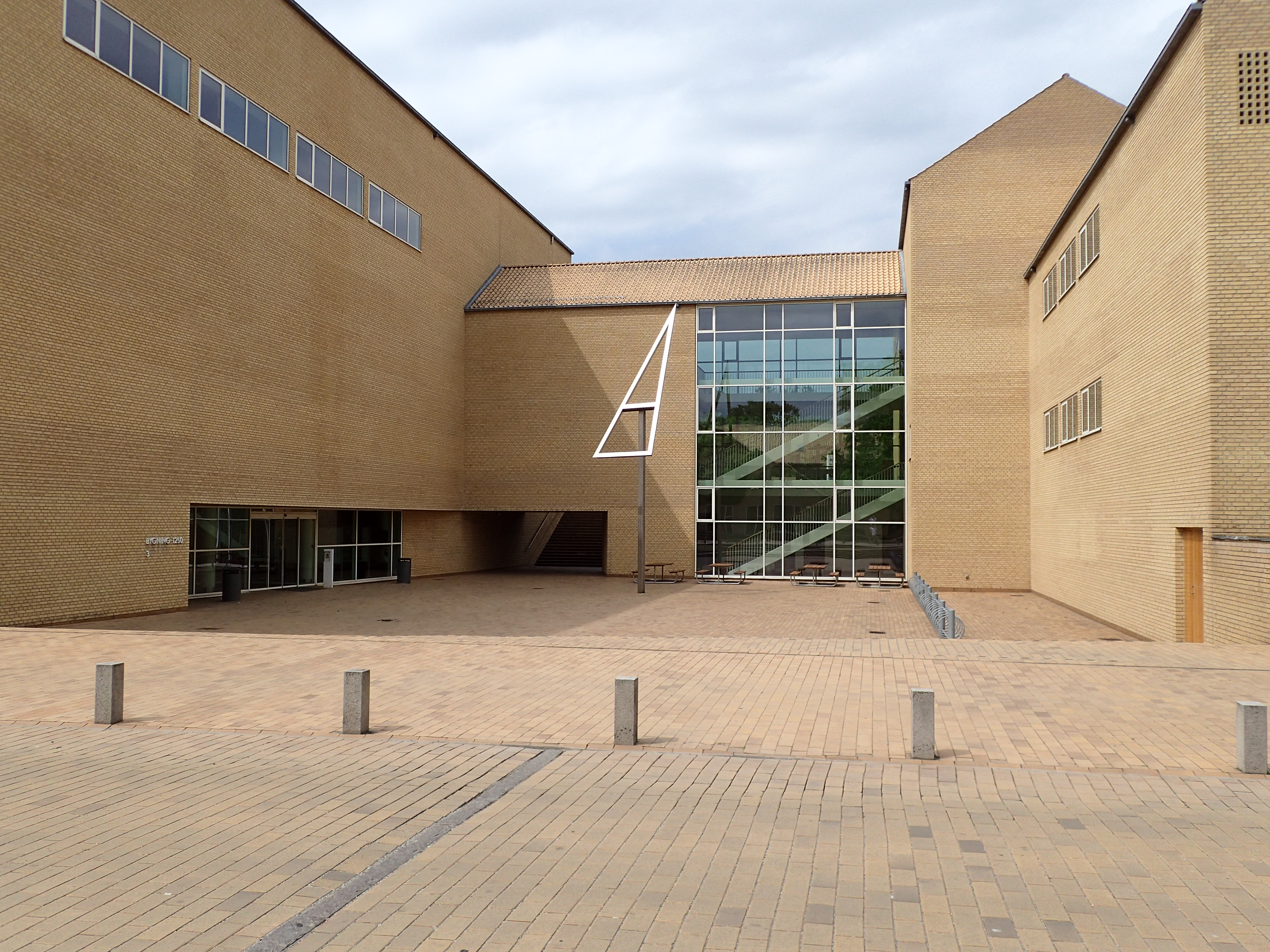
Søauditorierne (2001), part of the Aarhus University Campus

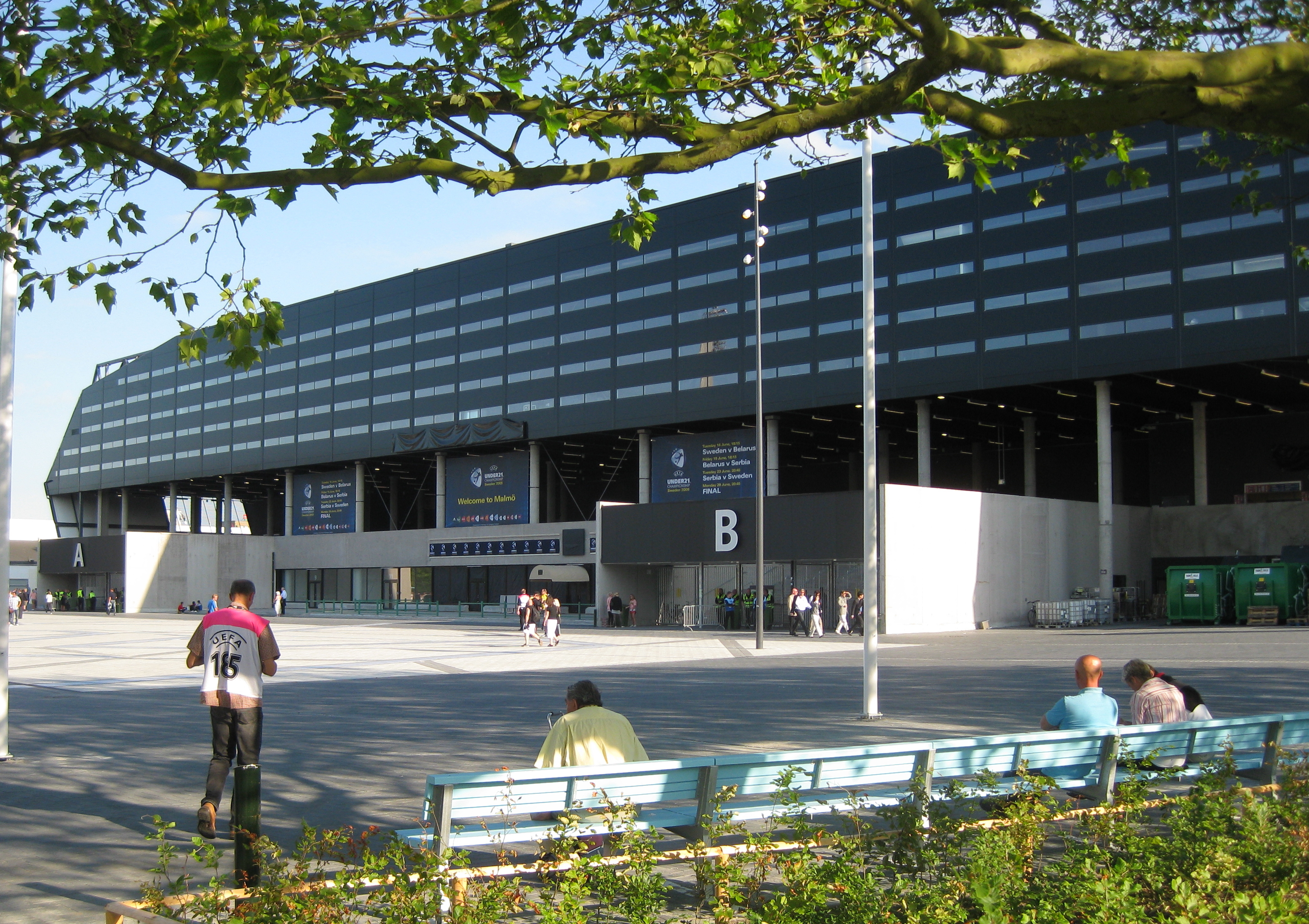
Swedbank Stadion (2009), Malmö Sweden

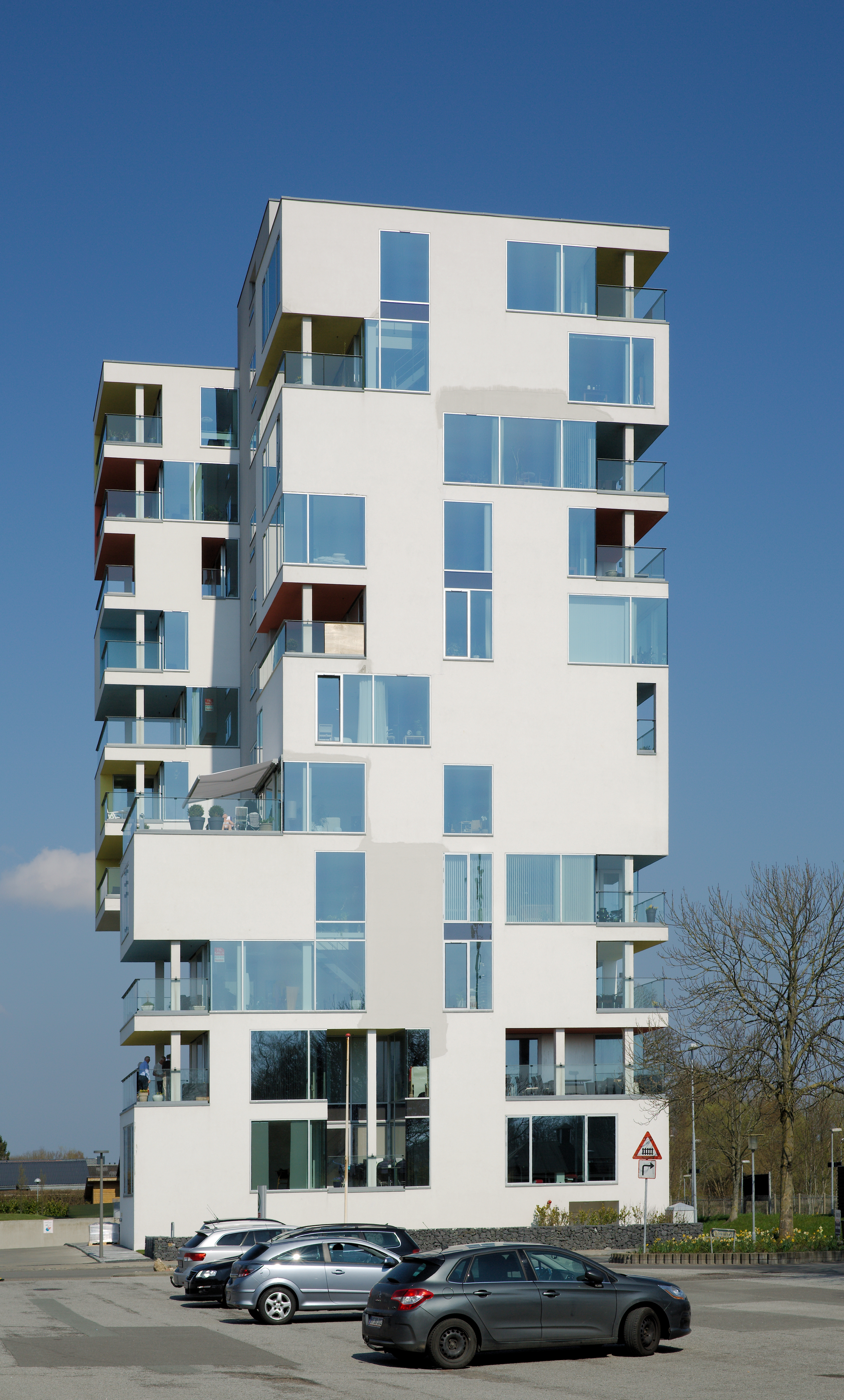
Siloetten apartment block (2010), Aarhus

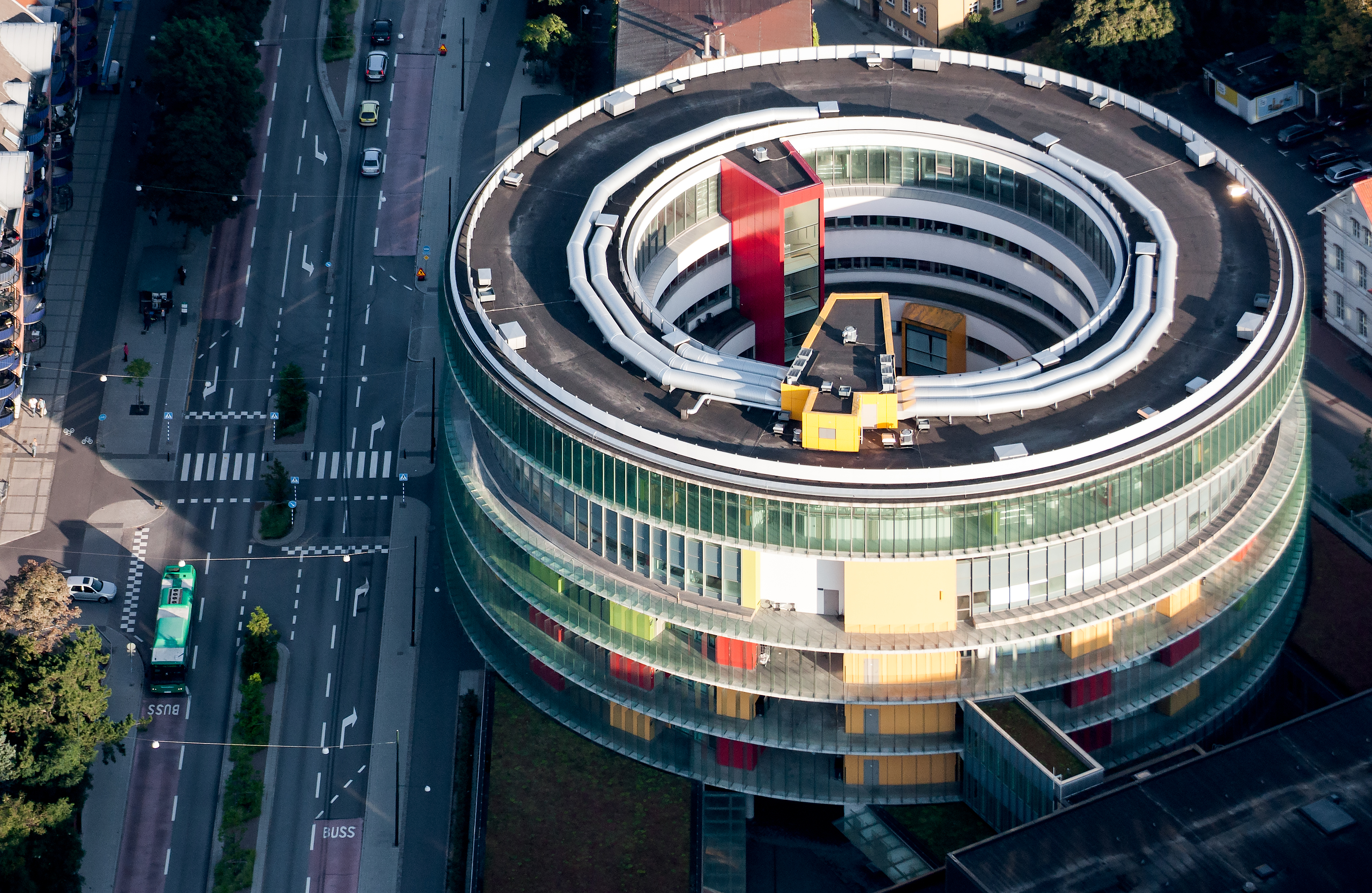
Emergency and infectious diseases unit, MAS University Hospital (2011), Malmö

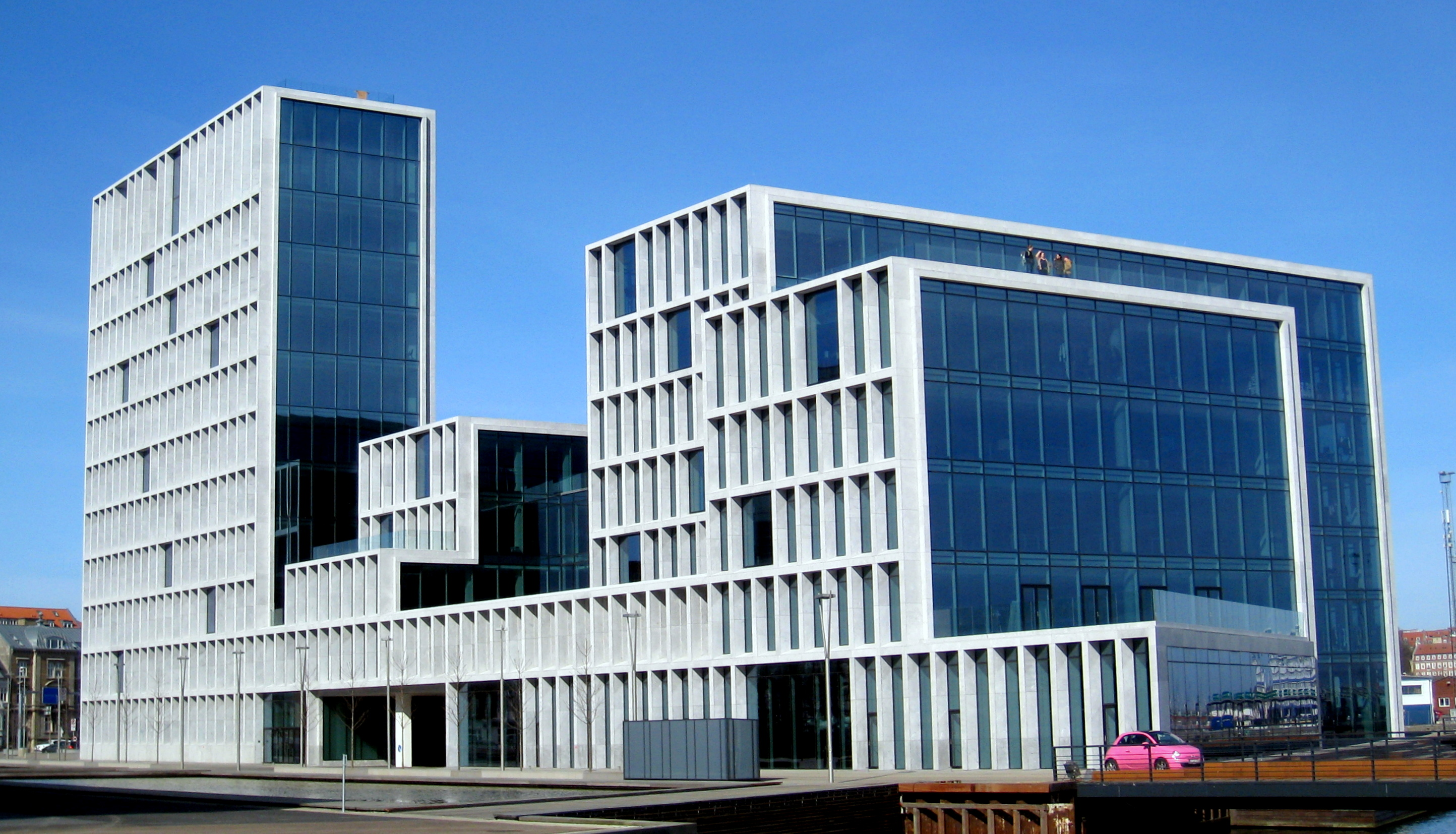
Bestseller headquarters (2015), Aarhus

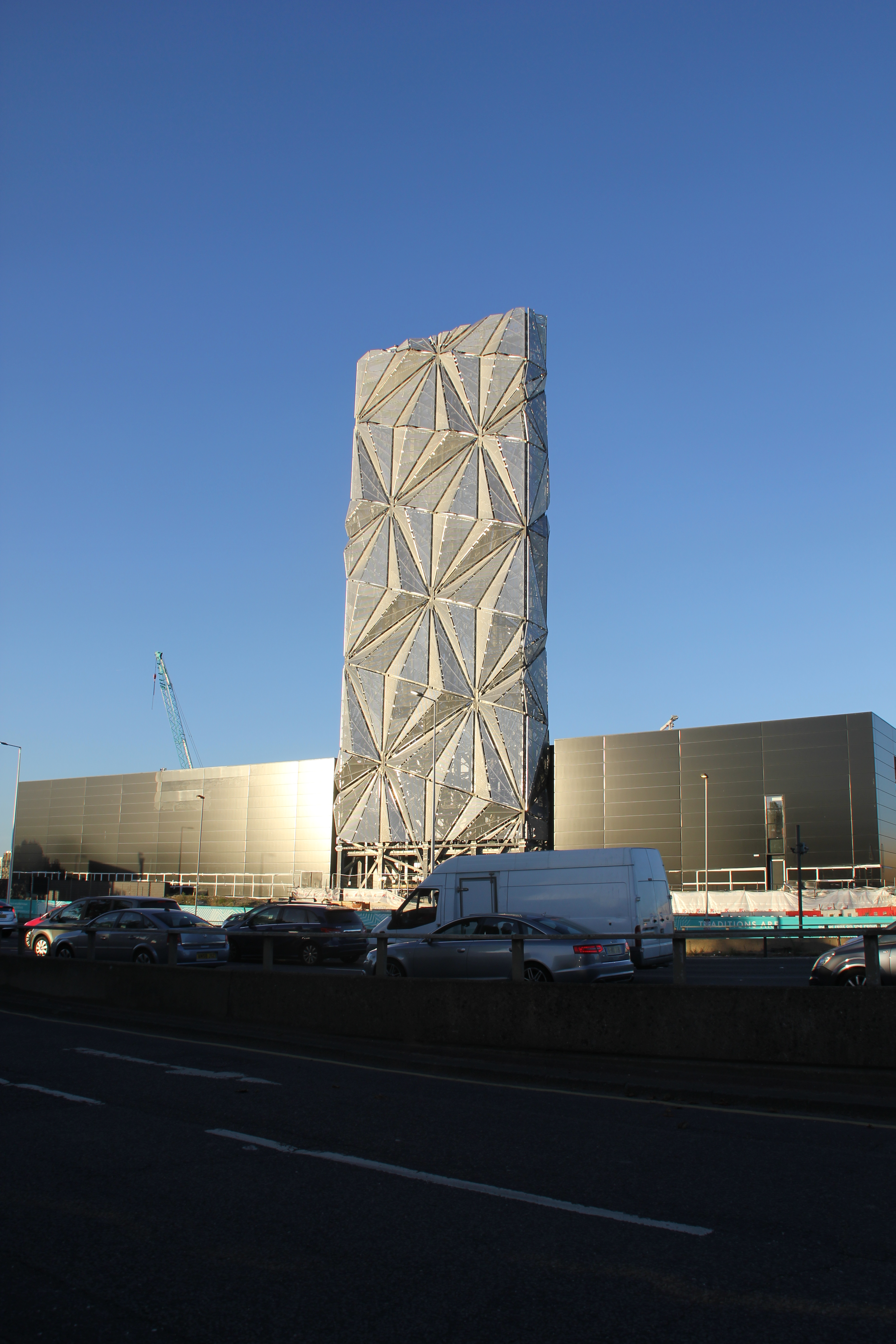
Greenwich Peninsula Low Carbon Energy Centre (2017), London

=== In progress ===
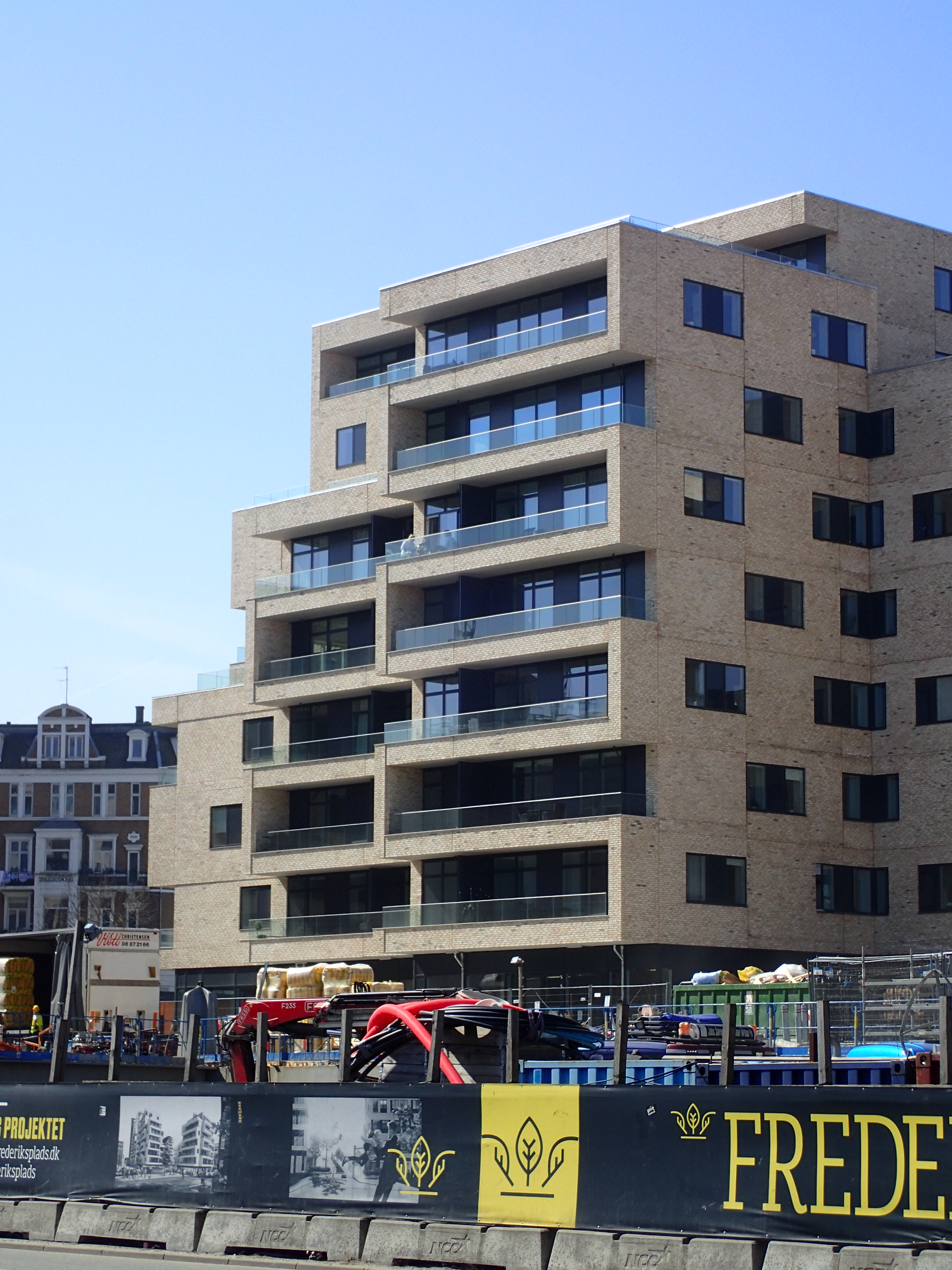
Apartment building project (2018)

- Aarhus University Hospital extension, Århus, DK (competition win 2007)
- Plot MO116, Greenwich, UK (competition win 2007)
- National Diabetes Centre, King Khalid University Hospital, Riyadh, Saudi Arabia (commission 2009)

== Awards ==
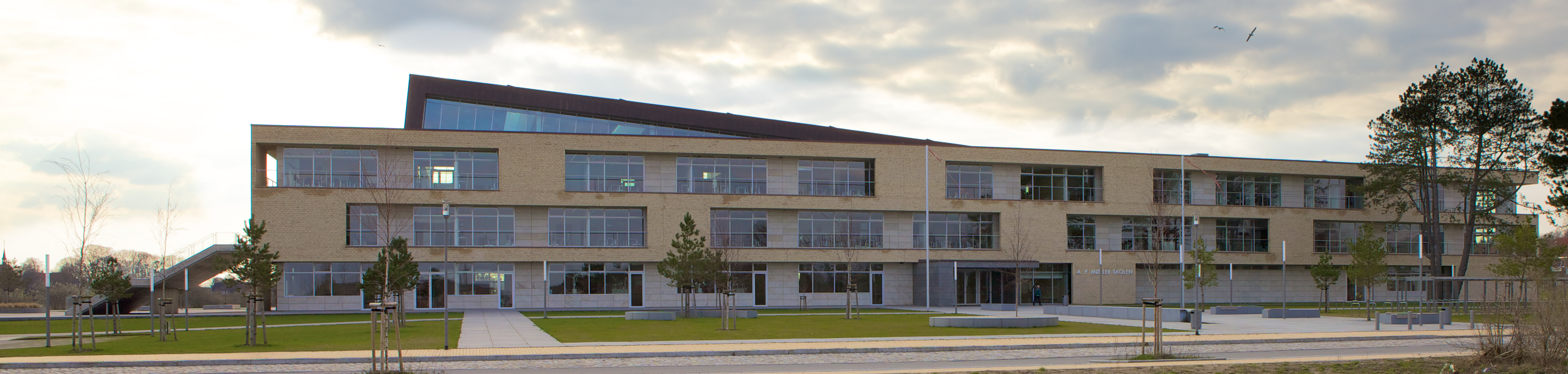
The A. P. Møller Skolen in Schleswig (2008), Southern Schleswig, Germany

- 2006 Nykredit Architecture Prize
- 2009 Building Better Healthcare Award for Akershus Hospital, London
- 2009 Concrete Society Awards for Excellence - Overall Winner for Darwin Centre Phase Two, London
- 2010 RIBA European Award for A. P. Møller School
- 2010 Worldwide Brick Award for A. P. Møller School, London
- 2010 WAN Award for The Sil(o)houette (residential category)
- 2011 Civic Trust Award for Darwin Centre Phase Two
- 2012 Civic Trust Award for Hospice Djursland
- 2014 Civic Trust Awards for Aalborg Waterfront

== See also ==
- Architecture of Denmark
- List of Danish architectural firms
