= Field's =

Shopping centre in Copenhagen, Denmark

Coordinates: 55°37′49″N 12°34′40″E

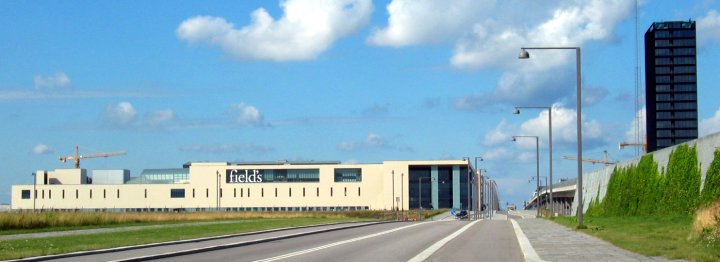
Field's seen from the south (next to the tall Ferring Building)

Field's is a shopping centre in Ørestad, Copenhagen, close to the E20 motorway and Ørestad Station on the Copenhagen Metro. At 115,000 m^{2}, it is the second-largest mall in Denmark after Waves, and one of the largest in Scandinavia. It is owned by Steen & Strøm Danmark A/S and was designed by C. F. Møller Architects, Evenden and Haskolls.

== History ==
Field's opened on 9 March 2004, with more than 250,000 customers visiting the centre during its first week in business. Field's occupies more than 115,000 m^{2} under one roof and features a total of approx. 150 stores, with more than 70 specialising in clothing, fashion or footwear.

=== 2022 shooting ===
On 3 July 2022, three people were shot and killed in a mass shooting at Field's. A 22-year-old Danish man was later arrested by police. The shooting was not designated as a terror attack.

== Shops and restaurants ==
- KFC
- Søstrene Grene
- Burger King
- Hunkemöller
- Bilka
- H&M
- Quiksilver
- Skechers
- The Body Shop
- Kings and Queens
