= Kasongo (disambiguation) =

Kasongo is a town and territory in the Democratic Republic of the Congo. Kasongo may also refer to

- Kasongo Airport in the city of Kasongo
- Roman Catholic Diocese of Kasongo located in the city of Kasongo
- Kasongo Lunda Territory in the Democratic Republic of Congo
  - Kasongo Lunda, a town and seat of Kasongo Lunda Territory
  - Kasongo Lunda Airport in Kasongo Lunda
- Kasongo (name)
