= Sundby station =

Copenhagen metro station

Sundby
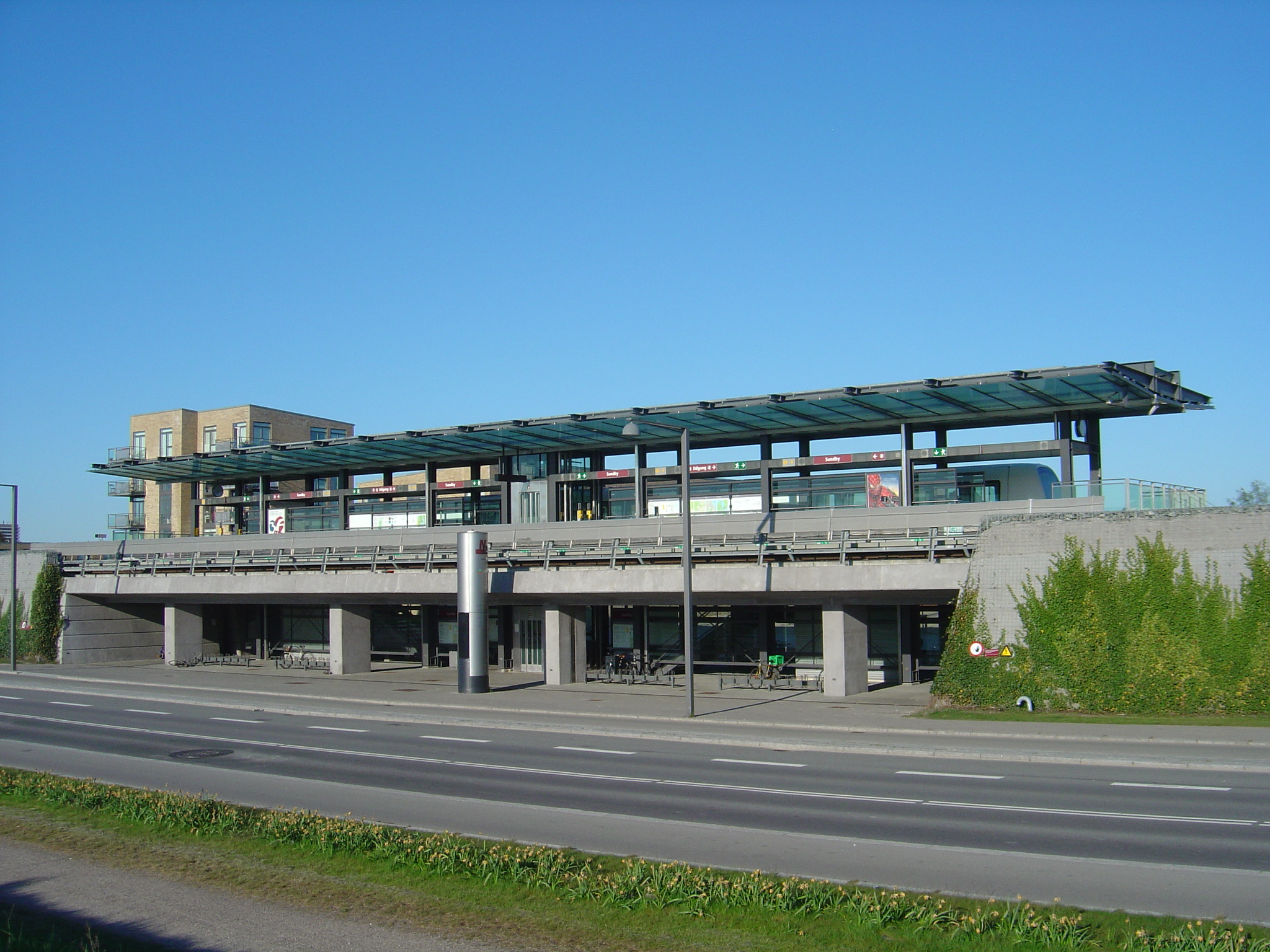
- Sundby Station seen from Ørestads Boulevard

General information
- Location: Ørestads Boulevard 25; 2300 Copenhagen S
- Coordinates: 55°38′42.8″N 12°35′8.7″E
- System: Copenhagen Metro Station
- Owner: Metroselskabet
- Platforms: 1 island platform
- Tracks: 2

Construction
- Structure type: Elevated
- Accessible: Yes

Other information
- Station code: Khs
- Fare zone: 3

History
- Opened: 19 October 2002; 24 years ago

Passengers
- 2018: 1,000 per weekday

Services
Preceding station	Copenhagen Metro	Following station
DR Byen towards Vanløse	M1	Bella Center towards Vestamager
Location
- Location within Greater Copenhagen Location within Denmark

Sundby station is a rapid transit station on the Copenhagen Metro. It is served by the M1 line. The station is elevated from ground level and opened on 19 October 2002. It is located in fare zone 3. With an average of 1,000 passengers per weekday, it is the least-used station in the network.
