= KGN =

KGN, Kgn or kgn may refer to:

- KGN, the IATA code for Kasongo Lunda Airport, Kwango Province, Democratic Republic of the Congo
- KGN, the National Rail station code for Kings Nympton railway station, North Devon, England
- Kgn, the station code for Kongens Nytorv station, Copenhagen, Denmark
- kgn, the ISO 639-3 code for Karingani language, Iran
