= Bella Center station =

Copenhagen metro station

Bella Center
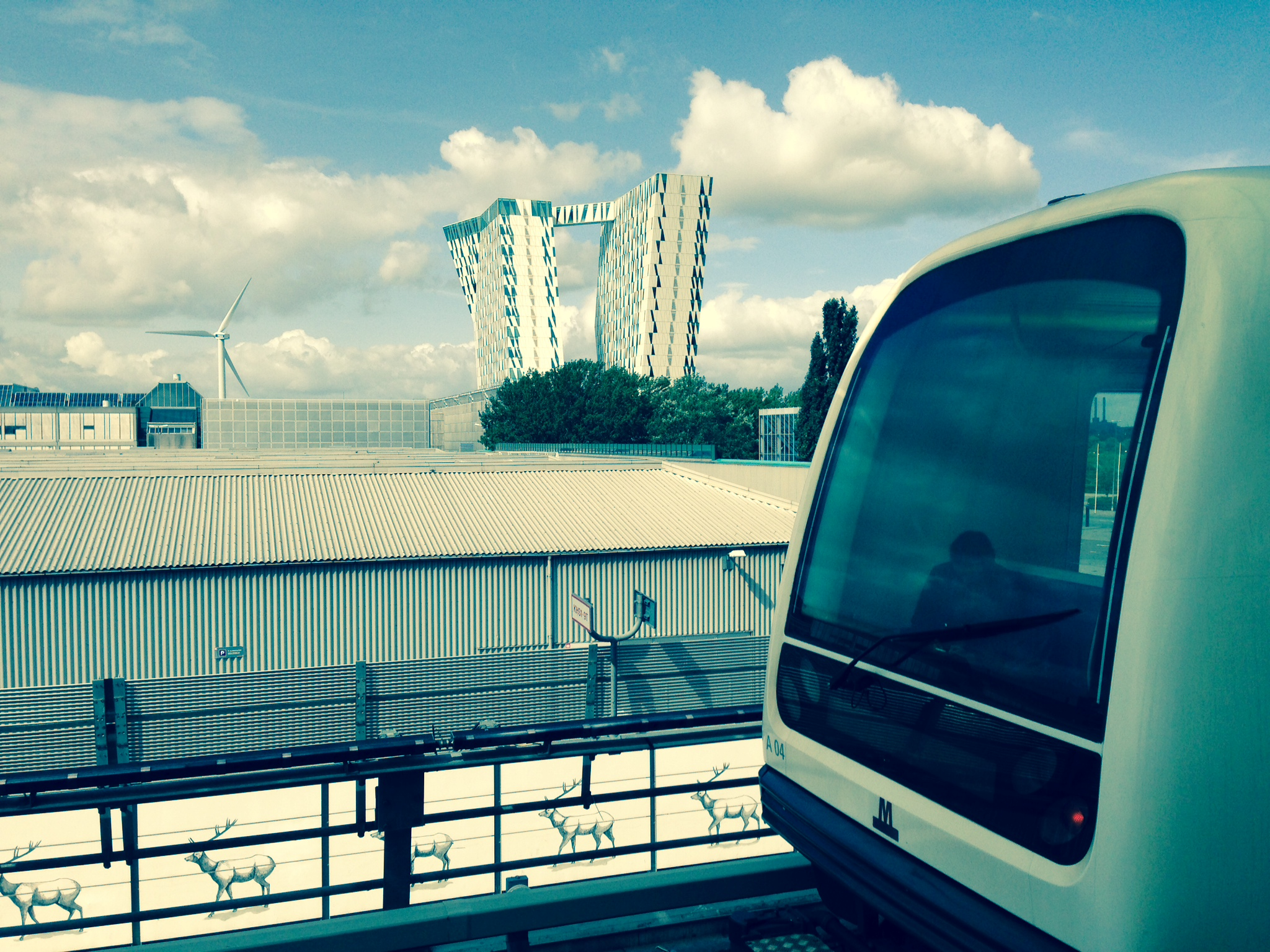

General information
- Location: Ørestads Boulevard 39; 2300 Copenhagen Municipality S Denmark
- Coordinates: 55°38′17″N 12°34′58.6″E
- System: Copenhagen Metro Station
- Owner: Metroselskabet
- Operator: Metro Service A/S
- Platforms: 1 island platform
- Tracks: 2

Construction
- Structure type: Elevated
- Accessible: Yes

Other information
- Station code: Bsc
- Fare zone: 3

History
- Opened: 19 October 2002; 24 years ago

Passengers
- 2018: 4,000 per weekday

Services
Preceding station	Copenhagen Metro	Following station
Sundby towards Vanløse	M1	Ørestad towards Vestamager
Location
- Location within Greater Copenhagen Location within Denmark

Bella Center station is a rapid transit station on the Copenhagen Metro. It is served by the M1 line. The station is elevated from ground level and opened on 19 October 2002. It is located in fare zone 3 and named after the Bella Center, a congress center located to the west of this station.
