= DR Byen station =

Copenhagen metro station

DR Byen
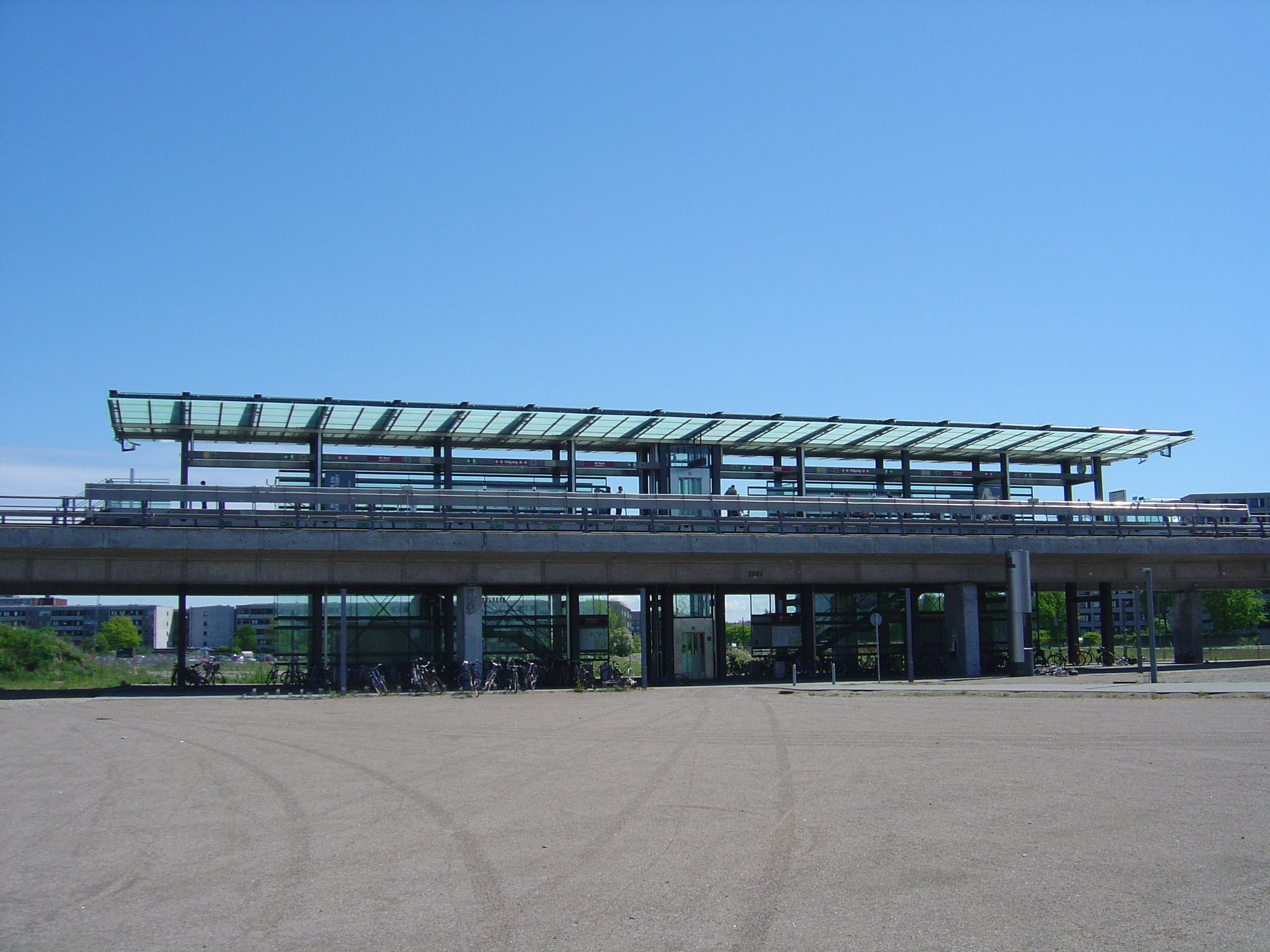
- DR Byen Station seen from Ørestads Boulevard

General information
- Location: Ørestads Boulevard 21; 2300 Copenhagen S
- Coordinates: 55°39′21″N 12°35′20.6″E
- System: Copenhagen Metro Station
- Owner: Metroselskabet
- Platforms: 1 island platform
- Tracks: 2
- Bus routes: 78

Construction
- Structure type: Elevated
- Accessible: Yes

Other information
- Station code: Uni
- Fare zone: 1 and 3

History
- Opened: 19 October 2002; 24 years ago

Passengers
- 2018: 5,000 per weekday

Services
| Preceding station | Copenhagen Metro | Following station |
|---|---|---|
| Islands Brygge towards Vanløse | M1 | Sundby towards Vestamager |
Location
- Location within Copenhagen Location within Greater Copenhagen Location within Denmark

DR Byen station is a rapid transit station on the Copenhagen Metro. It is served by the M1 line. The station is elevated from ground level. It is located in fare zones 1 and 3, and opened in 2002.

The station is situated in the northern part of Ørestad. The name of the station is related to Danmarks Radio's new headquarters DR Byen (DR town) that lies close to the station. Originally, the station was named Universitetet Station, because of new university buildings were intended to be constructed near the station, but the project was moved nearer Islands Brygge Station, next to the old buildings.
