= Nørreport railway station =

Main line, commuter and rapid transit railway station in Copenhagen, Denmark

Nørreport
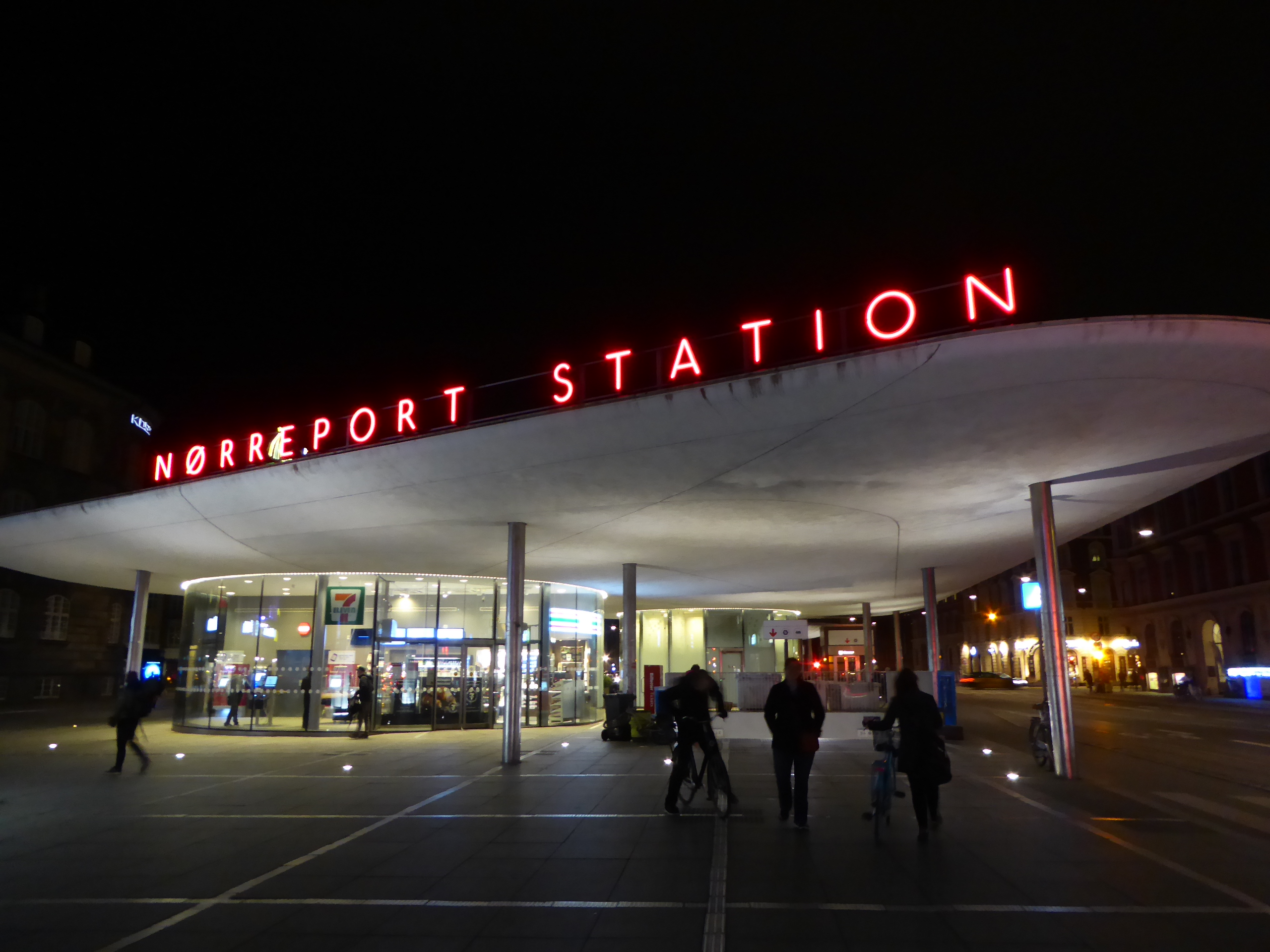
- Nørreport station at night

General information
- Location: Nørre Voldgade 13; 1358 Copenhagen K Copenhagen Municipality; Denmark
- Coordinates: 55°41′00″N 12°34′18″E
- Owner: DSB (station infrastructure); Banedanmark (rail infrastructure)
- Lines: Boulevard Line
- Platforms: 3 island platforms (S-train, Metro, Kystbanen)
- Tracks: 6 (2 S-train, 2 Metro, and 2 Kystbanen)
- Train operators: DSB; Skånetrafiken; Metro Service A/S
- Bus routes: 14, 25, 184, 185, 5C, 6A, 15E, 150S, 350S, 94N

Construction
- Structure type: Underground
- Platform levels: 2
- Accessible: Yes

Other information
- Station code: Kn
- Fare zone: 1

History
- Opened: 1 July 1918; 19 October 2002 (Metro)
- Rebuilt: 15 May 1934 (S-train)
- Electrified: 1934 (S-train), 1986 (Mainline)

Passengers
- 2018: 50,000 per weekday (Copenhagen Metro)
Location

Nørreport station is an S-train, metro and main line railway station in Copenhagen, Denmark. It is located in the district of Indre By, and is named after the historic Nørreport city gate, at the original location of which it is located. It is one of the busiest railway stations in Denmark, serving 165,000 people daily. The entire station is underground, with three pairs of platforms: one for S-trains, one for main line trains and one for the metro. The station is located on the Boulevard Line of the S-train and main line network. Several bus lines run through and start from Nørreport above ground.

Located in fare zone 1, it serves lines M1 and M2 of the Metro, most S-train lines, regional trains to Zealand and southern Sweden, intercity trains to Esbjerg and international trains to Malmö and Gothenburg, Sweden, and trains to other places, but not express trains. The station has bicycle parking facilities, and bicycles are allowed on board the trains, but not during rush hours.

== History ==
The station opened on 1 July 1918, as part of the tunnel which would connect the stations Østerport and Copenhagen Central Station. S-train service began on 15 May 1934.

In order to let passengers easily change from S-trains and regional trains to the Metro and vice versa, a tunnel was constructed to connect the train platforms with the Metro platforms. The S-train platforms were therefore closed partially from March 2000 to February 2002, allowing only the front-most four doors to open at the station.

With the opening of the first phase of the Metro on 19 October 2002, Nørreport station started serving M1 and M2. The station was the original terminus until it moved to Frederiksberg when phase 2A opened on 29 May 2003.

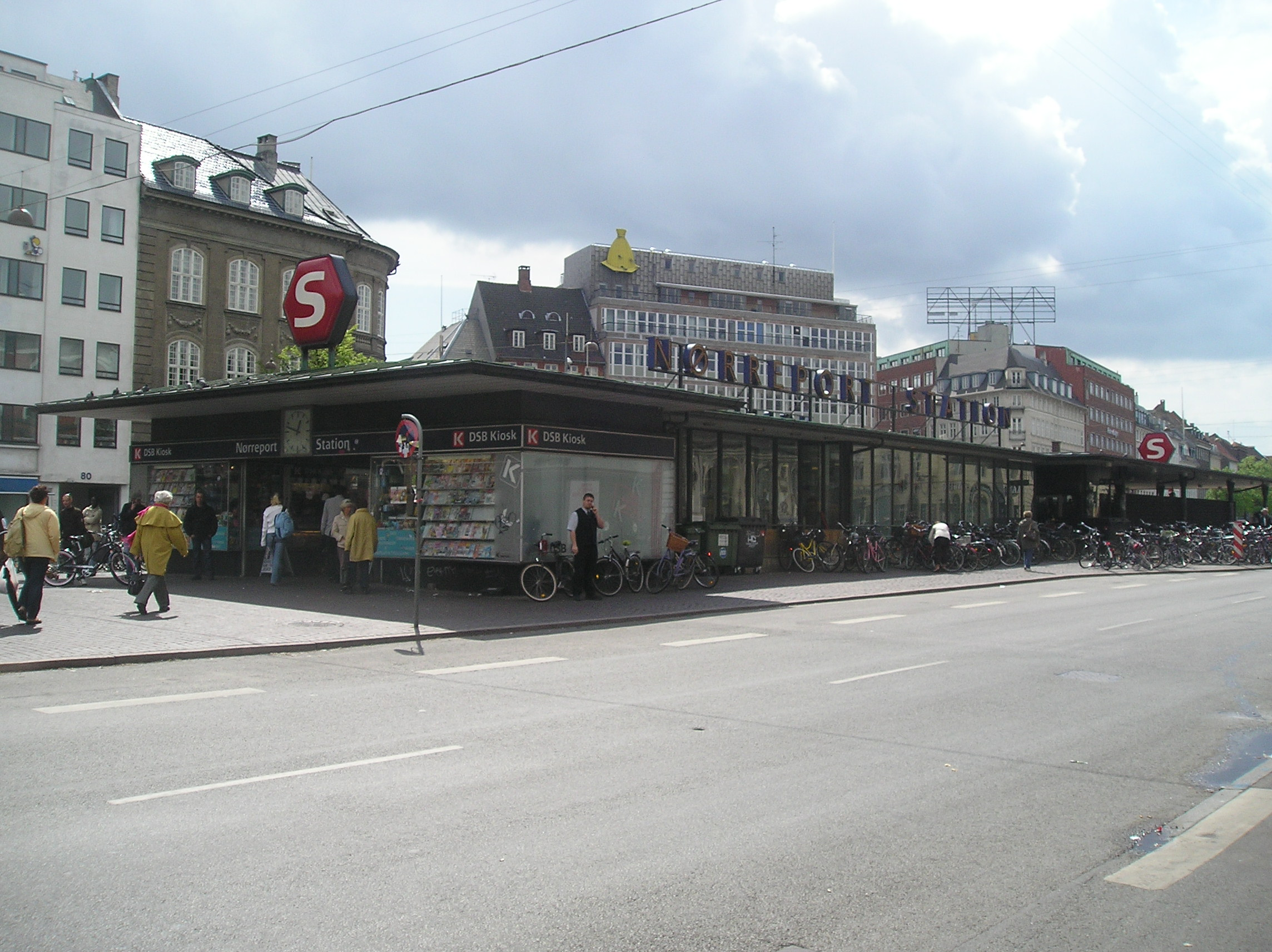
Former station building (now demolished)

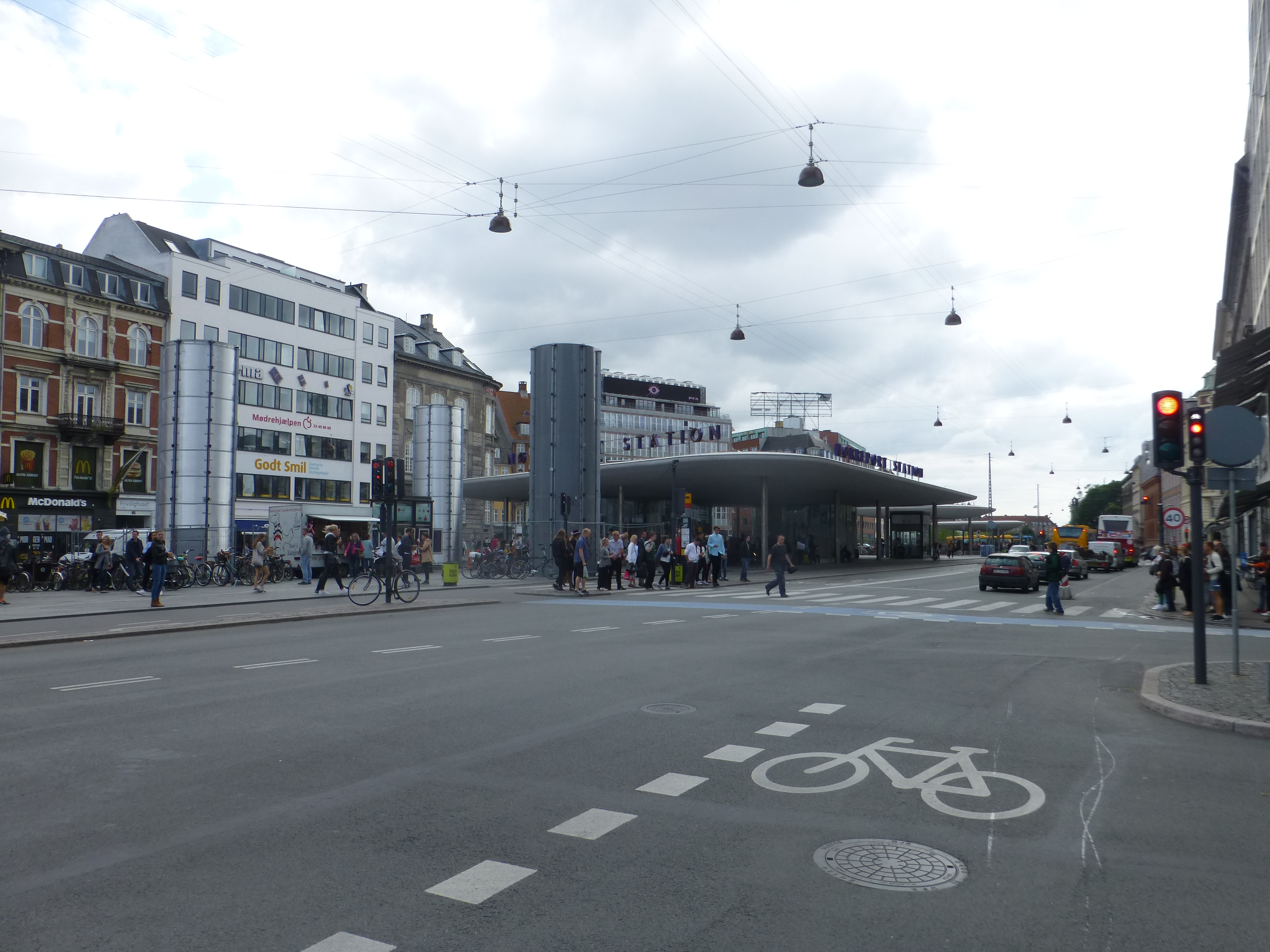
One of the 4 entrances to the S-train and regional platforms (the metro can be reached from transfer tunnel)

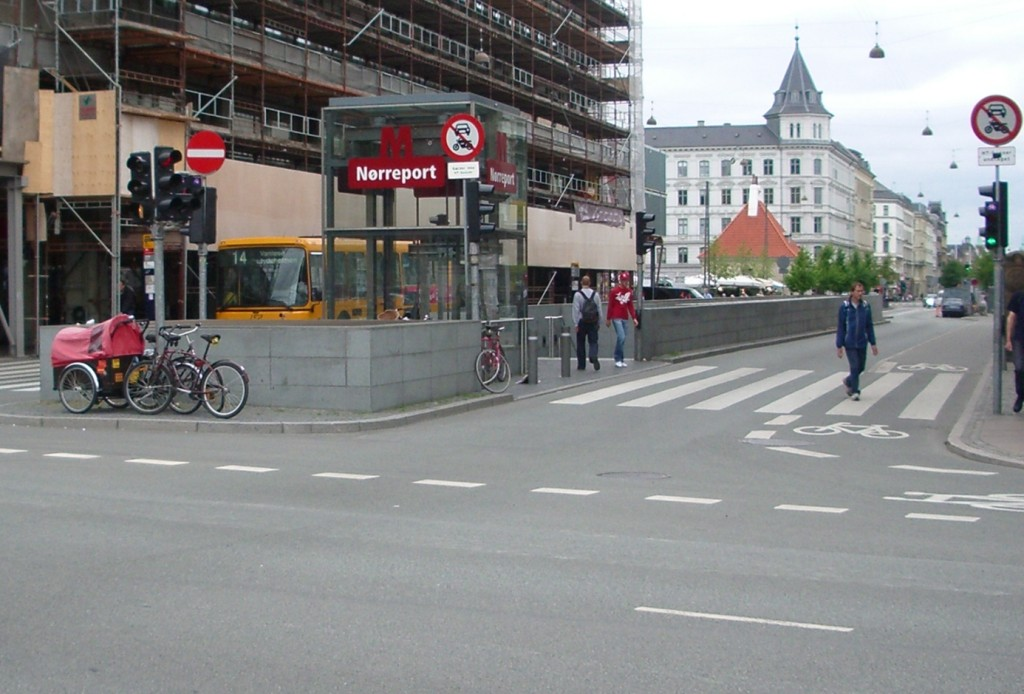
Overground main entrance to the Metro station

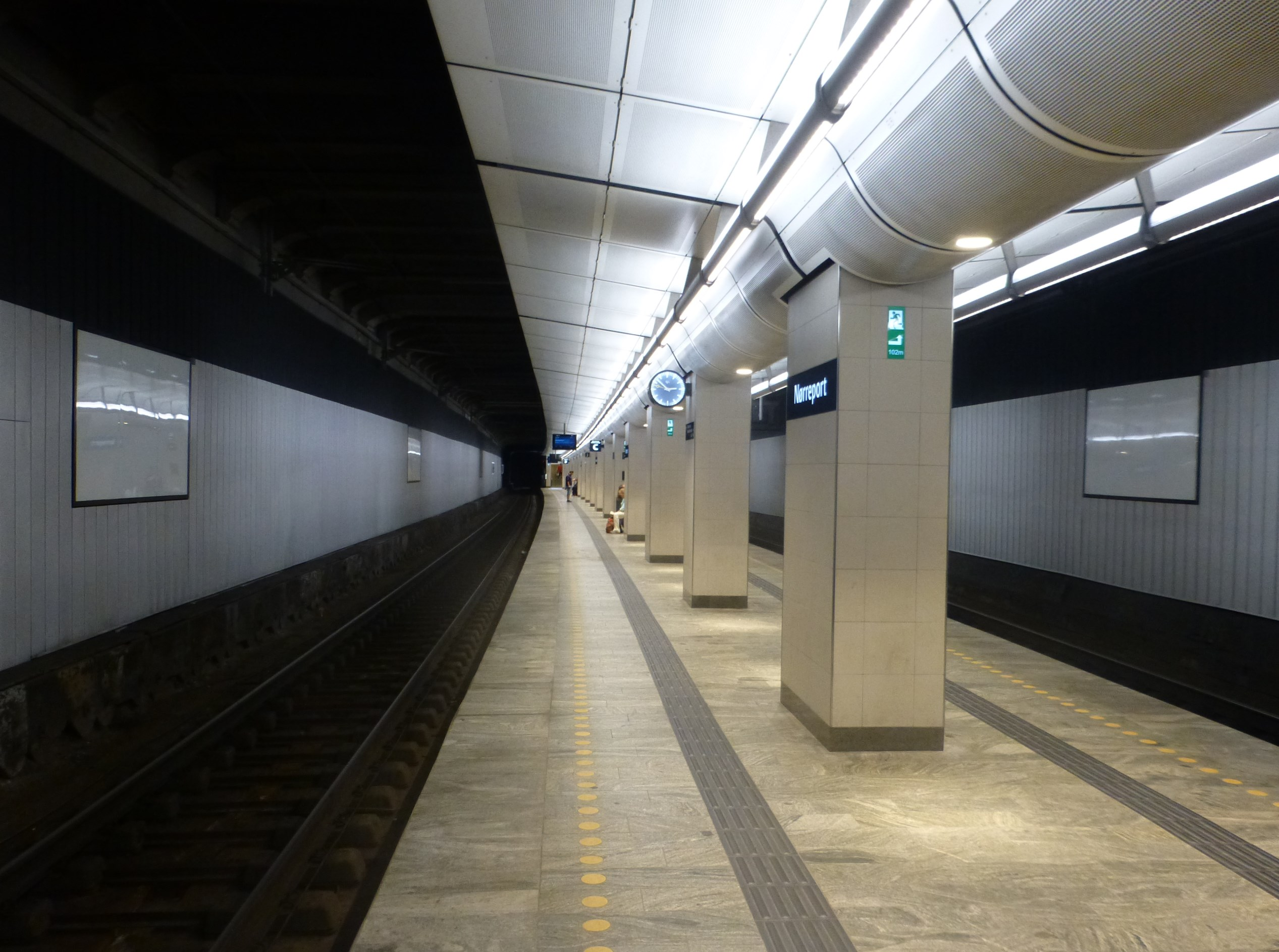
Regional Platform

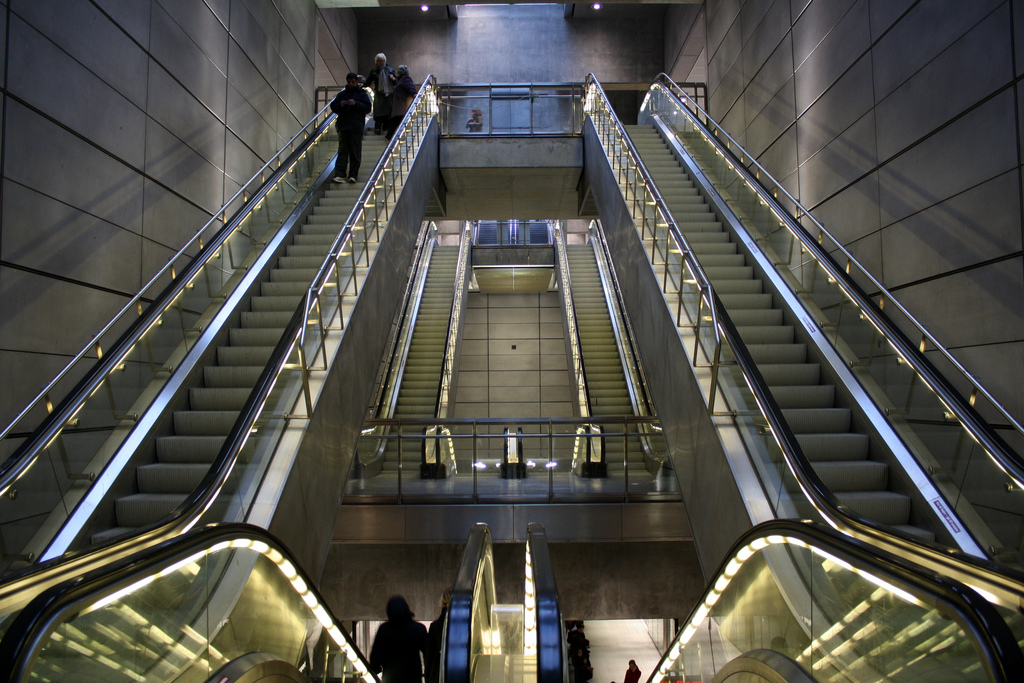
Nørreport metro station (M1 and M2)

== Plans ==
The former station building was worn down and dimly lit, and the air quality was poor due to the use of diesel trains, at least on the regional train platform. Passengers also had to cross busy streets to access the station. Therefore, DSB presented a proposal for a new station. One of the adjacent roads was pedestrianised, thereby making the station easier to access. A new glass roof at ground level allows more light into the station. The new station design also improved air quality thanks to a new ventilation system.

The proposal was a product of discussions between DSB, the Greater Copenhagen Authority and the Copenhagen Municipality. The decision to go ahead was made in 2009 and the rebuilding took place between 2011 and 2016. The S-train platform has been renovated and remains open. The platforms for regional and intercity trains underwent renovation and reopened in April 2014.

== Services ==
Preceding station	DSB	Following station
Østerport Terminus	Copenhagen–Esbjerg InterCity	Copenhagen Central towards Esbjerg
Østerport towards Helsingør	Elsinore–Copenhagen– Roskilde–Holbæk Regional train	København H towards Holbæk
Østerport towards Helsingør	Elsinore–Copenhagen– Roskilde–Næstved Regional train	København H towards Næstved
Østerport towards Helsingør	Elsinore–Copenhagen– Køge–Næstved Regional train Peak hours	København H towards Næstved
Østerport Terminus	Copenhagen–Køge–Næstved Regional train	København H towards Næstved
Østerport Terminus	Copenhagen–Kalundborg Regional train	København H towards Kalundborg
Preceding station	Øresundståg	Following station
Østerport Terminus	Copenhagen–Lund Øresundståg	København H towards Lund C
Østerport Terminus	Copenhagen–Gothenburg Øresundståg	København H towards Göteborg C
Østerport Terminus	Copenhagen–Kalmar Øresundståg	København H towards Kalmar C
Østerport Terminus	Copenhagen–Karlskrona Øresundståg	København H towards Karlskrona C
Preceding station	S-train	Following station
Østerport towards Hillerød	A	Vesterport towards Hundige
Østerport towards Hillerød	A Sat–Sun	Vesterport towards Køge
Østerport towards Farum	B	Vesterport towards Høje Taastrup
Østerport towards Buddinge	Bx Peak hours	Vesterport towards Høje Taastrup
Østerport towards Klampenborg	C	Vesterport towards Frederikssund
Østerport towards Holte	E Mon–Fri	Vesterport towards Køge
Østerport Terminus	H Mon–Fri	Vesterport towards Ballerup
Preceding station	Copenhagen Metro	Following station
Forum towards Vanløse	M1	Kongens Nytorv towards Vestamager
Forum towards Vanløse	M2	Kongens Nytorv towards Lufthavnen

== Number of travellers ==
According to the Østtællingen in 2008:

År	Antal	År	Antal	År	Antal	År	Antal
1957	20.944	1974	26.169	1991	31.035	2001	24.405
1960	20.777	1975	25.302	1992	31.562	2002	24.317
1962	22.086	1977	25.724	1993	30.725	2003	35.996
1964	23.579	1979	34.332	1995	31.541	2004	41.929
1966	24.721	1981	36.276	1996	32.473	2005	40.775
1968	25.931	1984	34.151	1997	30.590	2006	41.771
1970	26.673	1987	34.513	1998	29.994	2007	41.275
1972	27.998	1990	31.094	2000	26.061	2008	41.323

== See also ==
- List of Copenhagen Metro stations
- List of Copenhagen S-train stations
- List of railway stations in Denmark
- Rail transport in Denmark
- History of rail transport in Denmark
- Transport in Copenhagen
- Transport in Denmark
