= Kongens Nytorv station =

Copenhagen metro station

Kongens Nytorv
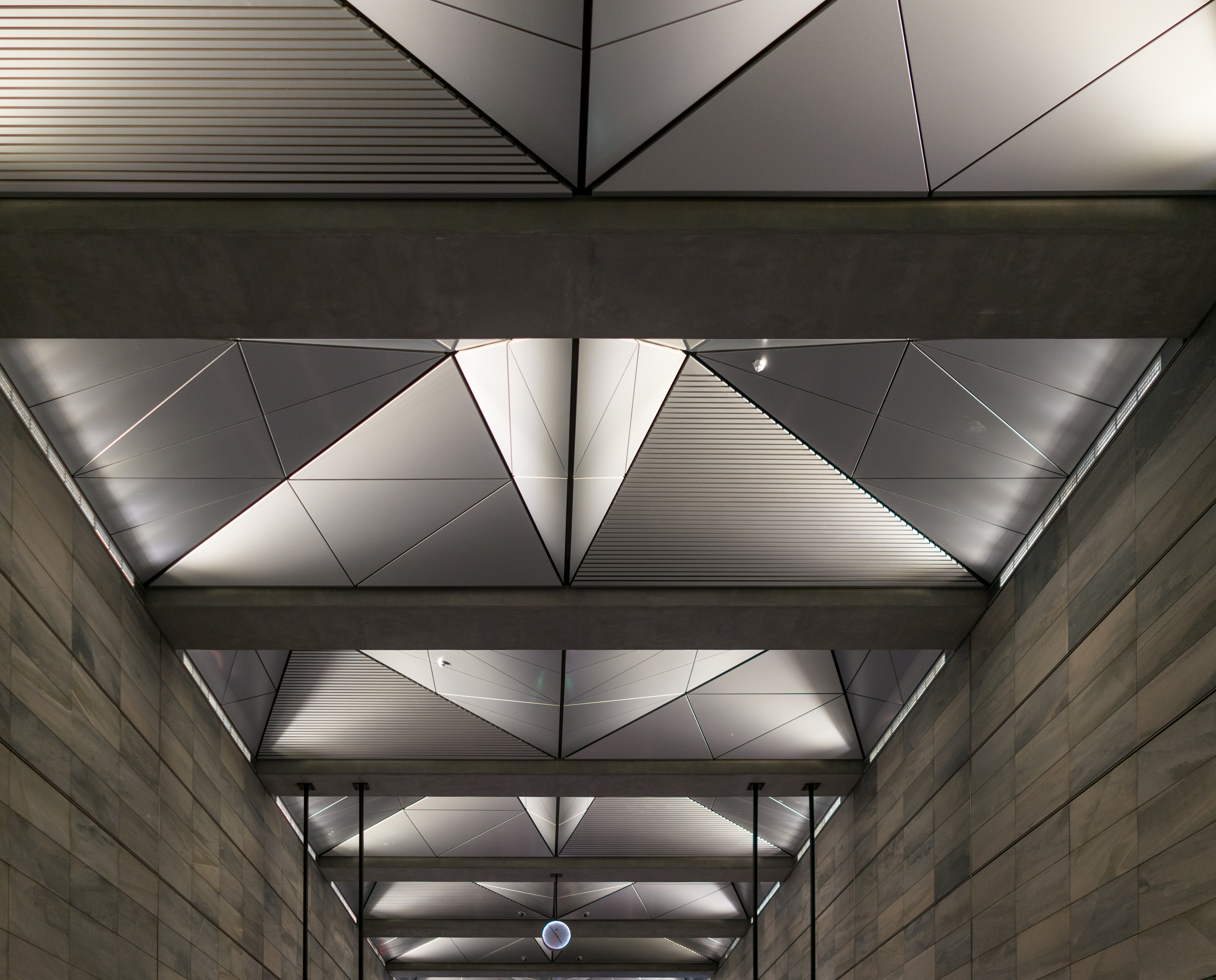

General information
- Location: Kongens Nytorv 11, 1050 København K Copenhagen Municipality; Denmark
- Coordinates: 55°40′45.6″N 12°35′6.6″E
- System: Copenhagen Metro rapid transit station
- Owner: Metroselskabet
- Platforms: 2 island platform (1 for M1/M2, 1 for M3/M4)
- Tracks: 4 (2 for M1/M2, 2 for M3/M4)
- Bus routes: 23

Construction
- Structure type: Underground
- Platform levels: 2
- Cycle facilities: Yes
- Accessible: Yes

Other information
- Station code: Kgn
- Fare zone: 1

History
- Opened: 19 October 2002; 24 years ago
Location
- Location within Copenhagen Location within Greater Copenhagen Location within Denmark

Kongens Nytorv station (Danish pronunciation: [ˈkʰʌŋŋ̍s ˈnyˌtsʰɒˀw], lit. King's New Square) is a Copenhagen Metro station located at Kongens Nytorv in downtown Copenhagen, Denmark. The station is located at the intersection of the M1/M2 and M3/M4 lines and is in fare zone 1. The station affords direct access to the Magasin du Nord department store.

== History ==
Kongens Nytorv station opened as part of the initial segment of the Copenhagen Metro, with trains running west to Nørreport and east to either Vestamager or Lergravsparken. Construction for the City Circle Line, which carries the M3 and M4 Lines and for which Kongens Nytorv acts as an interchange, began on 4 October 2009 with wire work and archaeological sites. The excavation began in mid-2011 and the M3 and M4 station was opened on 29 September 2019.

== Design ==
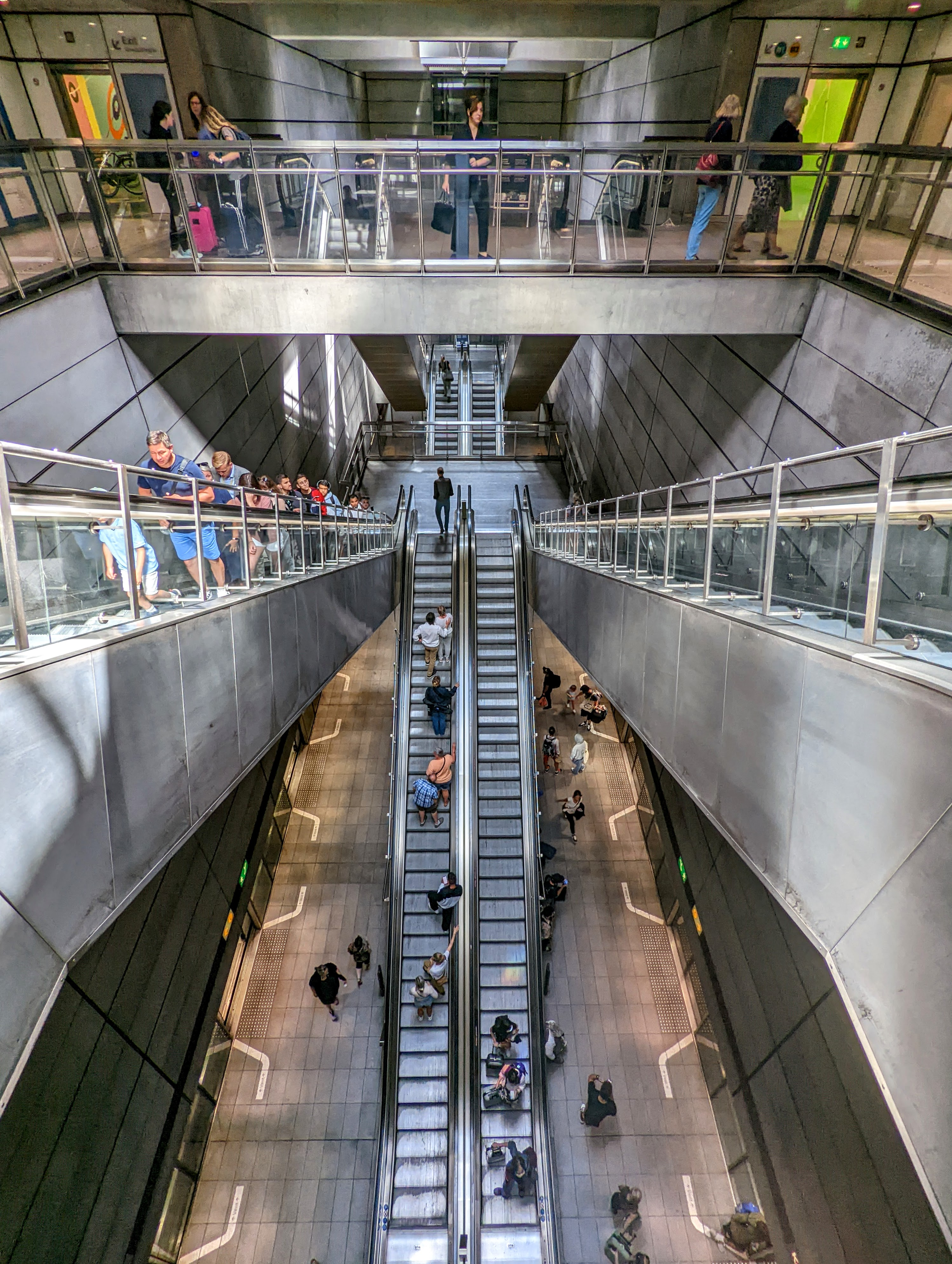
M1/M2 station

Kongens Nytorv is built and designed in the same style as other underground stations on the Copenhagen Metro. There are two main levels below ground level; the first is a few steps down from the street. At this level, passengers take an escalator down to a mezzanine switchback that makes them turn around and go down another escalator to reach platform level. There is also a lift that transports passengers to the platform. There are two entrances to the station as well: the southwestern corner of the intersection of Kongens Nytorv, Lille Kongensgade, Holmens Kanal, and Store Kongensgade and the other inside the Magasin du Nord department store.

== Service ==
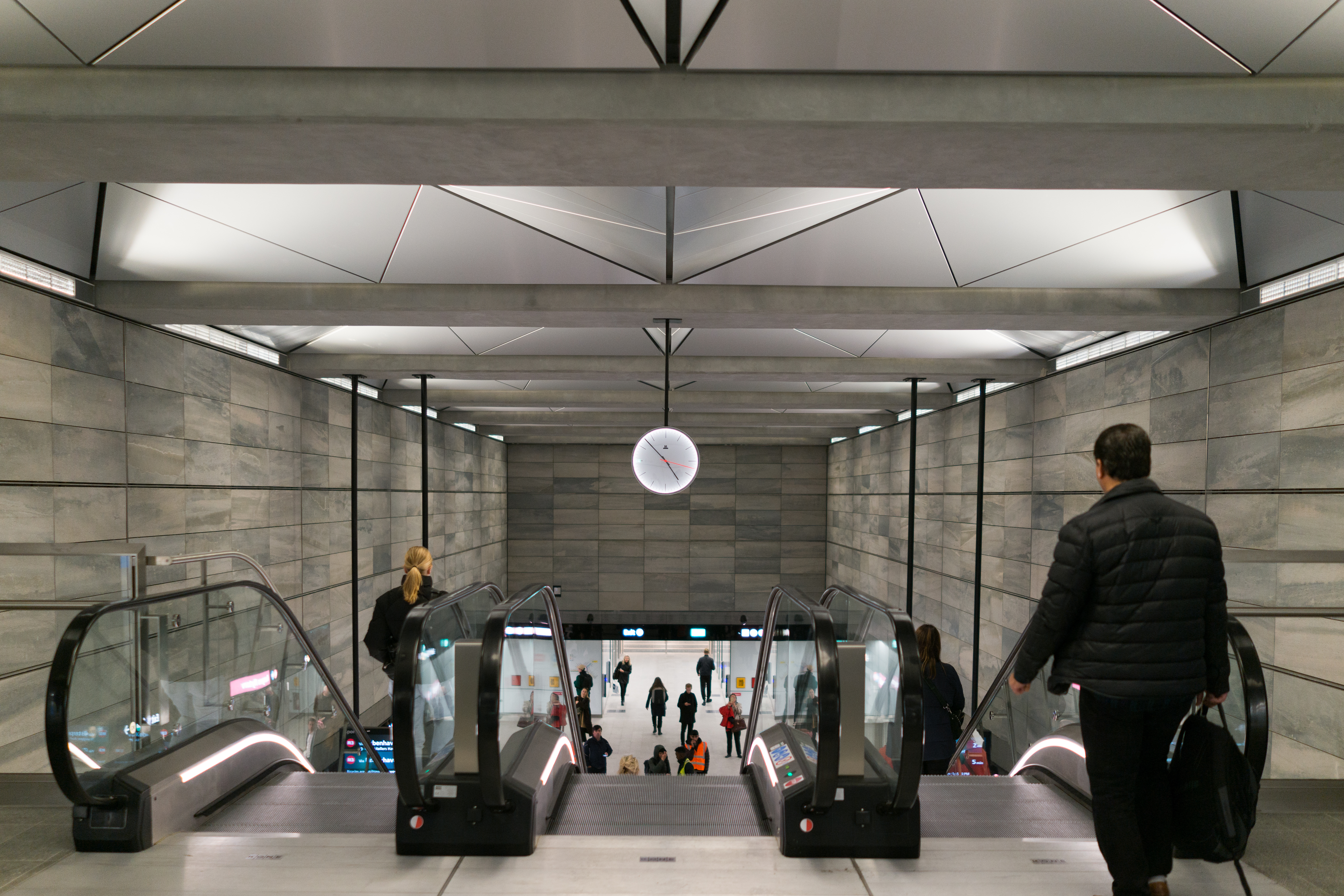
M3/M4 mezzanine

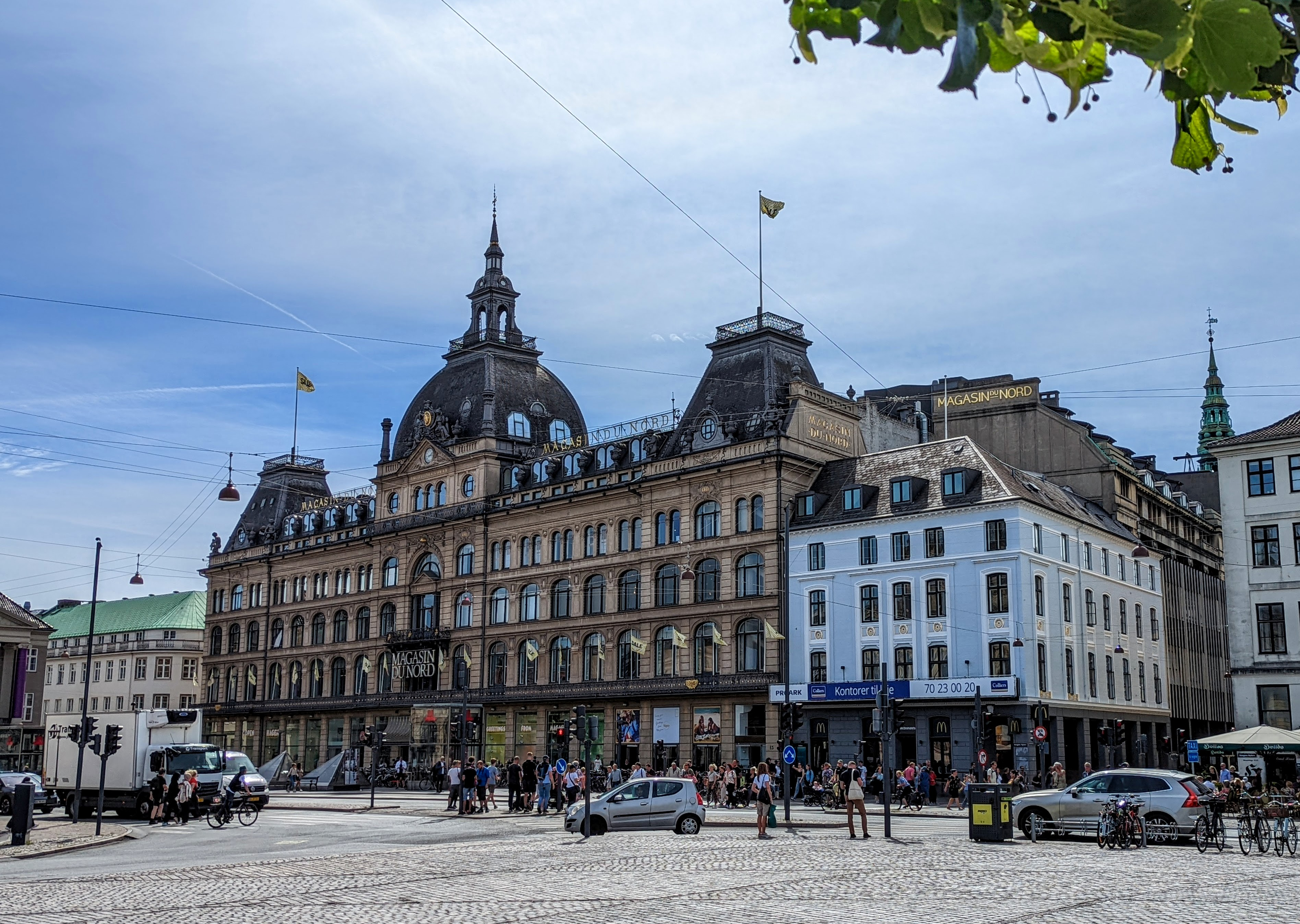
The station can be accessed from in front of Magasin du Nord, or from inside the building

Both original Copenhagen Metro lines, the M1 and the M2, serve Kongens Nytorv. Both operate westbound towards Vanløse and eastbound towards Vestamager on the M1 and Lufthavnen on the M2. Since the City Circle Line and M4 were completed on 29 September 2019 and 28 March 2020, Kongens Nytorv has acted as a connection between the older metro lines and the M3 and M4 lines.

Preceding station	Copenhagen Metro	Following station
Nørreport towards Vanløse	M1	Christianshavn towards Vestamager
Nørreport towards Vanløse	M2	Christianshavn towards Lufthavnen
Gammel Strand clockwise	M3	Marmorkirken counter-clockwise
Gammel Strand towards Copenhagen South	M4	Marmorkirken towards Orientkaj

== See also ==
- Kongens Nytorv
