= Forum station =

Copenhagen metro station

Forum
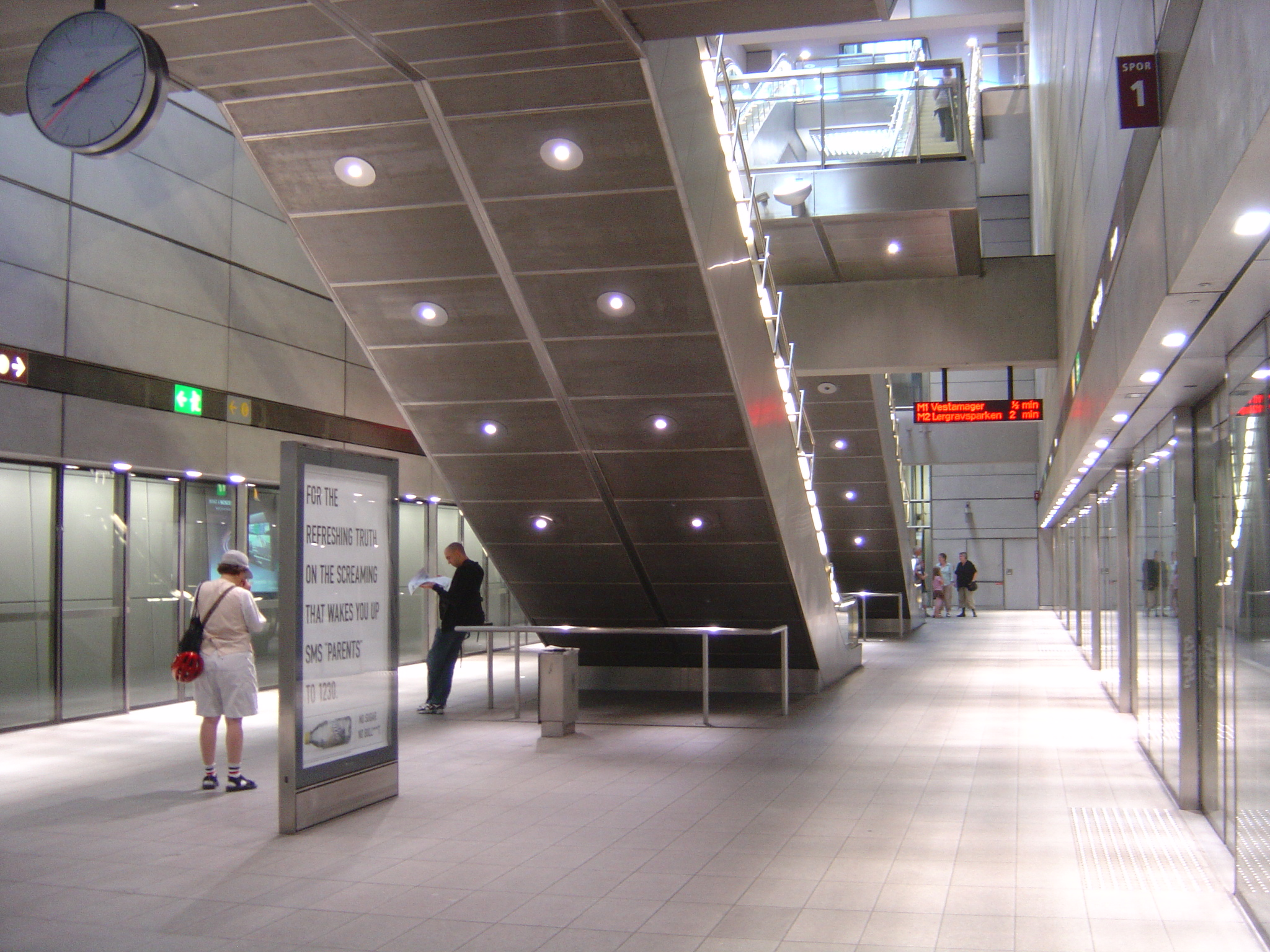

General information
- Location: 17 Rosenørns Allé, 1970 Frederiksberg C Frederiksberg Municipality; Denmark
- Coordinates: 55°40′54.3″N 12°33′10″E
- System: Copenhagen Metro Station
- Owner: Metroselskabet
- Platforms: 1 island platform
- Tracks: 2
- Bus routes: 71, 2A, 250S

Construction
- Structure type: Underground
- Accessible: Yes

Other information
- Fare zone: 1

History
- Opened: 29 May 2003; 23 years ago

Passengers
- 2018: 10,000 per weekday

Services
Preceding station	Copenhagen Metro	Following station
Frederiksberg towards Vanløse	M1	Nørreport towards Vestamager
Frederiksberg towards Vanløse	M2	Nørreport towards Lufthavnen
Location
- Location within Copenhagen Location within Greater Copenhagen Location within Denmark

Forum station is a rapid transit station on the Copenhagen Metro in Frederiksberg, Denmark. The station opened in 2003. It serves the M1 and M2 lines and connects with bus services. The station lies adjacent to Forum Copenhagen, a large special events venue, which has given the station its name. The station is in fare zone 1.

The station has bicycle parking facilities.
