= Bella Center =

Danish conference venue

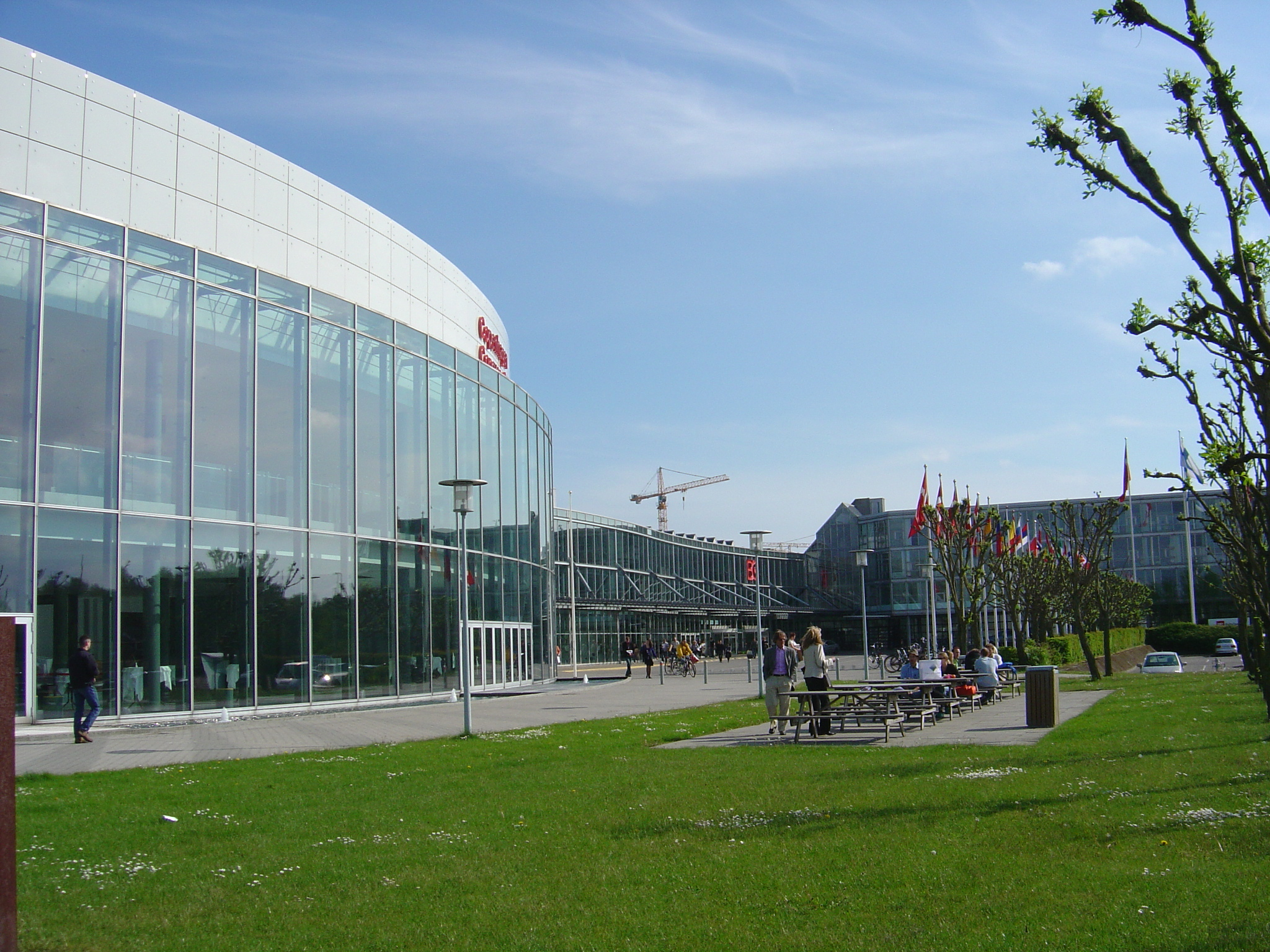
- Exterior of the venue seen from the northwest (c.2007)
- Address: Center Blvd 5 DK-2300 Copenhagen, Denmark
- Location: Ørestad
- Coordinates: 55°38′15″N 12°34′42″E
- Owner: BC Hospitality Group
- Public transit: Bella Center Station

Construction
- Opened: 1965; 61 years ago
- Expanded: 1973–75; 2000; 2009–2011; 2014; 2021

Website
- Official website

Bella Center (abbreviated BC) is Scandinavia's second largest exhibition and conference center (after Messecenter Herning), and is located in Copenhagen, Denmark. Located in Ørestad between the city centre and Copenhagen Airport, it offers an indoor area of 121,800 square metres (1,311,000 ft^{2}) and has a capacity of 30,000 people.

Among the larger annual events is the Copenhagen International Fashion Fair, the main event of Copenhagen Fashion Week held twice a year - in February and August, and CODE, the main event of Copenhagen Design Week.

== History ==
Former logo until circa 2015

Bella Center takes its name from Bellahøj in northern Copenhagen where the convention centre was first situated. Its first building was constructed in 1965 to the design of the architect Erik Møller. During 1973–75, Bella Center was moved to its current location on Amager between the city centre and Copenhagen airport, while the original building was converted into a sports center under the name Grøndals Centret. At this stage, Bella Center's new premises were located in an undeveloped area outside the city on the former Amager Commons.

With the development of Ørestad, as decided in 1992 with construction starting from around the turn of the millennium, Bella Center's surroundings are in the process of changing into a dense urban area. When the M1 line of the Copenhagen Metro opened in 2004, it was with a station named for the Bella Center located next to it.

== Facilities ==
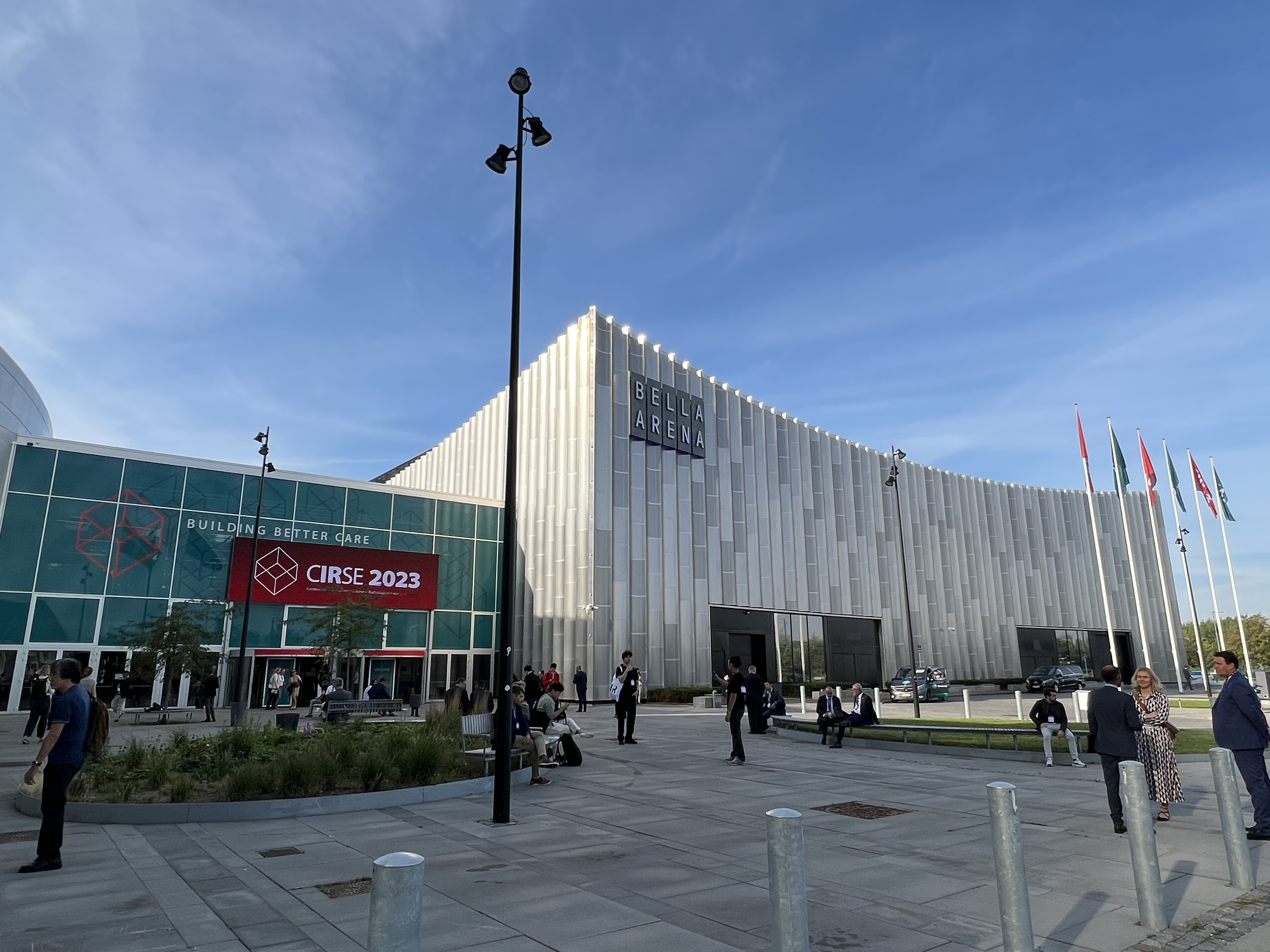
Bella Arena (right) is part of the congress center

Bella Center's facilities include:

- Congress Hall that can be divided into three individual sections (up to 4,200 persons)
- 4 auditoriums with capacities from 310–930 persons
- 63 flexible meeting rooms (from 2–400 persons)
- Center Hall for banquets, parties, welcoming area, etc.
- Various halls that can be used as congress and exhibition halls
- Shopping centre with a grocer's shop and florist

=== Bella Sky Hotel ===
The 814-room Bella Sky Hotel at Bella Center is now opened. Designed by Danish 3XN Architects, the hotel consists of two inclined towers, standing 76.5 m tall with an inclination in opposite directions of 15°.

The four-star Bella Hotel provides 814 rooms (100 suites), 32 conference rooms, 3 restaurants, a sky bar and a wellness centre. The foundation stone to Bella Hotel was laid 17 September 2008, and the first phase was completed in spring 2011.

== Events ==
Bella Center hosts a large variety of trade fairs, exhibitions, conventions and political summits. Every year, it generally hosts 25-30 large exhibitions as well as around 1,300 meetings of varying sizes.

Major events have included:

- 2017 ICANN 58
- 2009: United Nations Climate Change Conference 2009
- 2009: 13th Olympic Congress
- 2009: 121st International Olympic Committee Session
- 2009: 33rd Ordinary UEFA Congress
- 2006: MTV Europe Music Awards 2006
- 2002: European Council
- 1995: The World Summit for Social Development
- 1993: European Council

== Transport ==
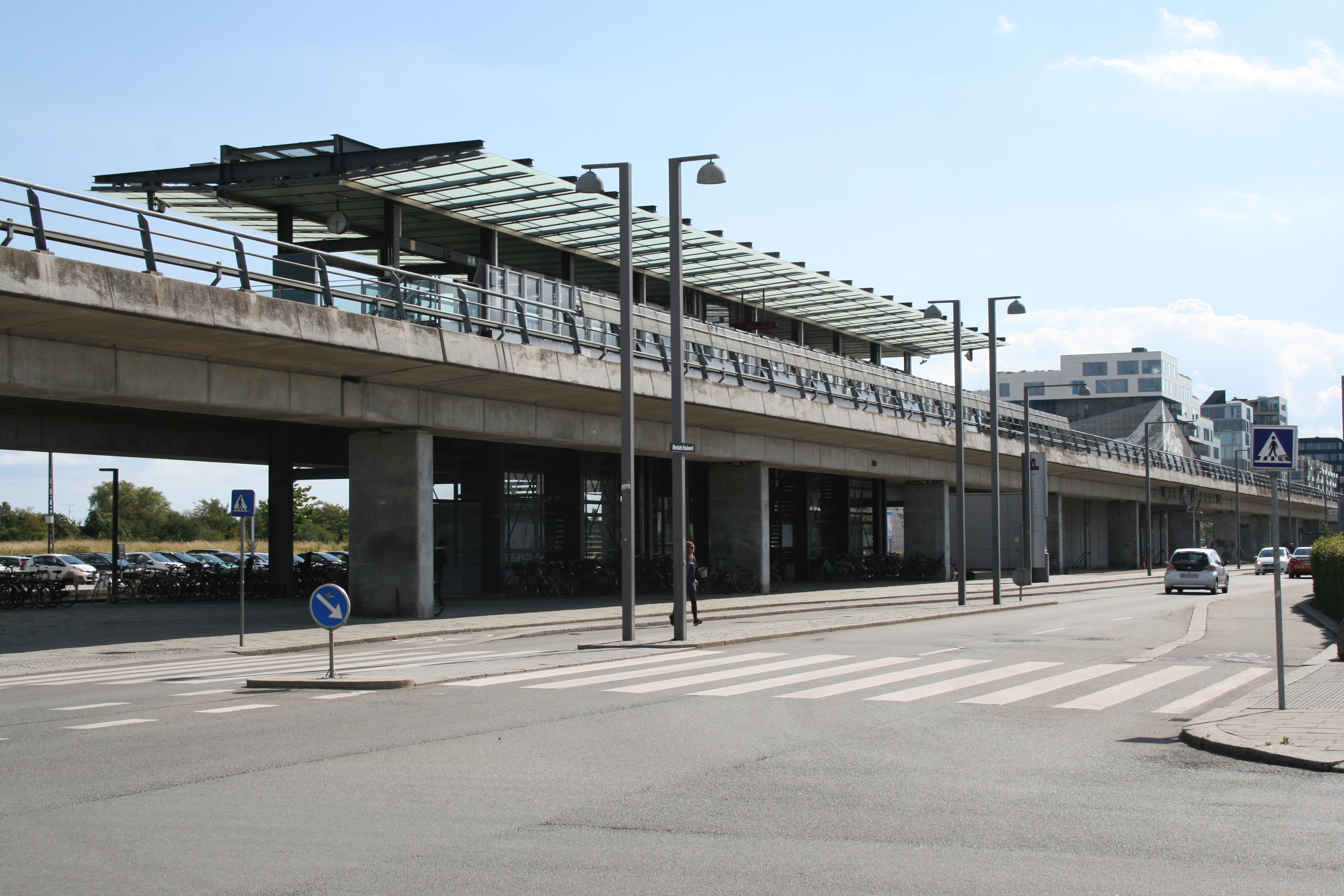
Bella Center Station, Copenhagen

Bella Center station on the M1 line of the Copenhagen Metro is located next to Bella Center.

The regional Oresundtrains from Copenhagen and Malmö stop at Ørestad station nearby the Bella Center. From here it is possible to change to the Metro M1 line to go one stop to reach the Bella Center metro station. The Oresundtrains also stop at Copenhagen Airport, 5 min. from Ørestad station.

== Cultural references ==
- Bella Center is used as a location at 0:22:17 in the 1977 Olsen-banden film The Olsen Gang Outta Sight.
