= Vesterport railway station =

Railway station in Copenhagen, Denmark

Vesterport
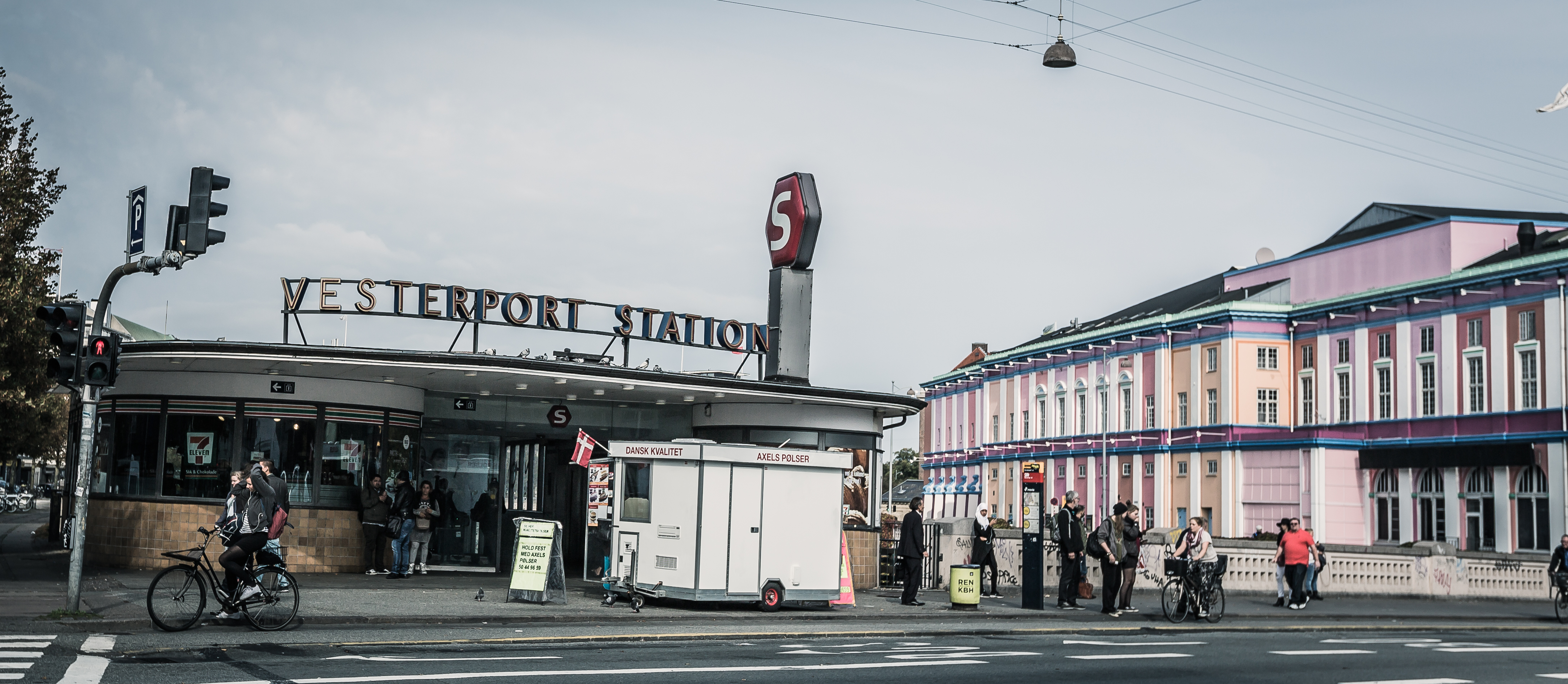
- Vesterport station in 2014

General information
- Location: Ved Vesterport; 1612 Copenhagen V Copenhagen Municipality; Denmark
- Coordinates: 55°40′35″N 12°33′45″E
- Elevation: 2.4 metres (7 ft 10 in)
- Owner: DSB (station infrastructure); Banedanmark (rail infrastructure)
- Lines: Boulevard Line
- Platforms: 1 island platform
- Tracks: 2 in service and 4 non-stop
- Train operators: DSB

Construction
- Structure type: Below grade
- Architect: K.T. Seest

Other information
- Station code: Vpt

History
- Opened: 15 May 1934; 92 years ago

Services
Preceding station	S-train	Following station
Nørreport towards Hillerød	A	København H towards Hundige
Nørreport towards Hillerød	A Sat–Sun	København H towards Køge
Nørreport towards Farum	B	København H towards Høje Taastrup
Nørreport towards Buddinge	Bx Peak hours	København H towards Høje Taastrup
Nørreport towards Klampenborg	C	København H towards Frederikssund
Nørreport towards Holte	E Mon–Fri	København H towards Køge
Nørreport towards Østerport	H Mon–Fri	København H towards Ballerup
Location

Vesterport station (Danish pronunciation: [ˈvestɐˌpʰoɐ̯ˀt stæˈɕoˀn]) is a S-train railway station in the centre of Copenhagen, Denmark. The station is located in the district of Indre By, and is named after the historic Vesterport city gate, although it is located quite a distance from the original location of the city gate. It opened in 1934. The station is situated below ground level on the Boulevard Line, just before the tunnel connecting Copenhagen Central Station and Østerport Station.

== Layout ==
The station is situated below ground level on the Boulevard Line, just before the tunnel connecting Copenhagen Central Station and Østerport Station. The station is located below street level, but is not under ground. Main line trains don't stop here, only S-trains.

== History ==
Vesterport Station opened on 15 May 1934 as S-train service on the Boulevard Line commenced. The station was designed by DSB chief architect K. T. Seest. As something new, it featured a kiosk building as well as a single escalator. The escalator was moving up and down alternately, with the result that passengers had to wait for it to move in the right direction.

In the early 1970s an extra staircase was constructed at the northern end of the platform. The station was refurbished in 2002 and again in 2010.

The building was listed in the Danish registry of protected buildings and places in 2004, but the Minister of Culture objected because the listing could stand in the way of future plans to cover the tracks with new buildings, with the result that the heritage listing was revoked. In 2012, the Danish Cultural Heritage Agency chose to list the building again.

== Operations ==
All S-train services except the F-line stop at the station.

== Number of travellers ==
According to the Østtællingen in 2008:

År	Antal	År	Antal	År	Antal	År	Antal
1957	8.810	1974	10.866	1991	16.919	2001	13.906
1960	9.201	1975	11.458	1992	16.229	2002	13.906
1962	9.134	1977	11.570	1993	15.887	2003	11.711
1964	9.755	1979	16.275	1995	15.842	2004	11.444
1966	9.530	1981	15.995	1996	15.595	2005	10.562
1968	10.626	1984	17.516	1997	14.485	2006	13.050
1970	11.017	1987	15.854	1998	15.018	2007	10.769
1972	11.616	1990	16.138	2000	15.161	2008	11.678

== In popular culture ==
Vesterport station is used as a location in the films Min kone fra Paris (1961) and Jensen længe leve (1965). It was also used as a location in the film version of 1967 Cirkusrevyen.

== Gallery ==
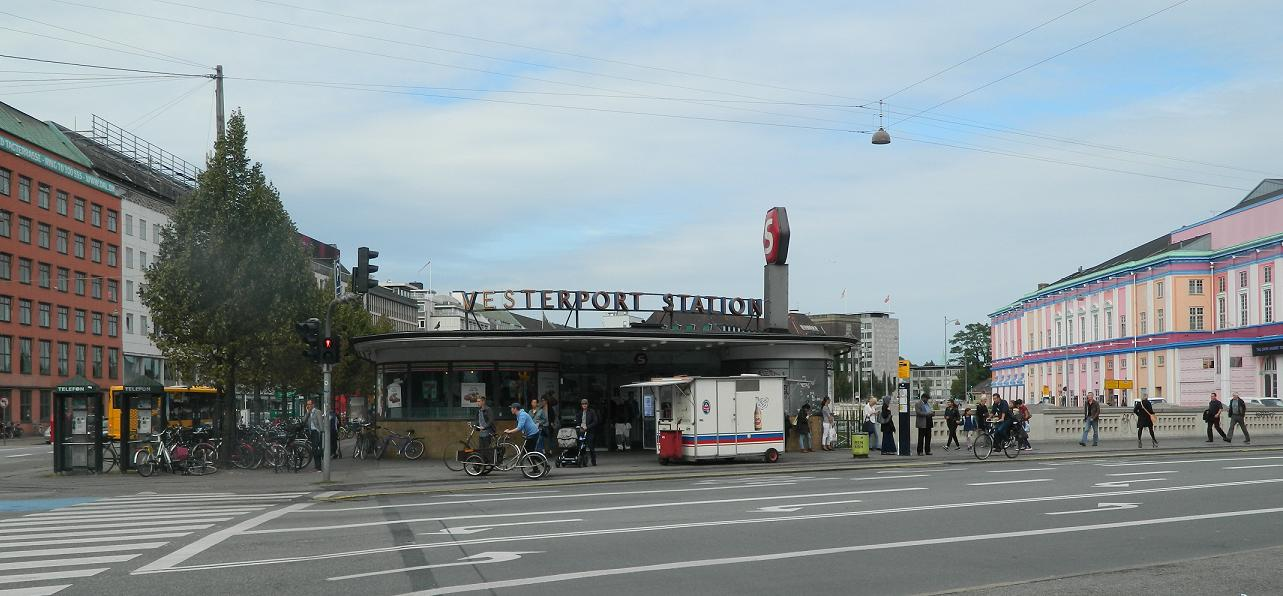
Vesterport S-train station has three entrances, this is the main one. The (mobile) little cart is a very typical Danish hot dog stand. Pølsevogn in Danish

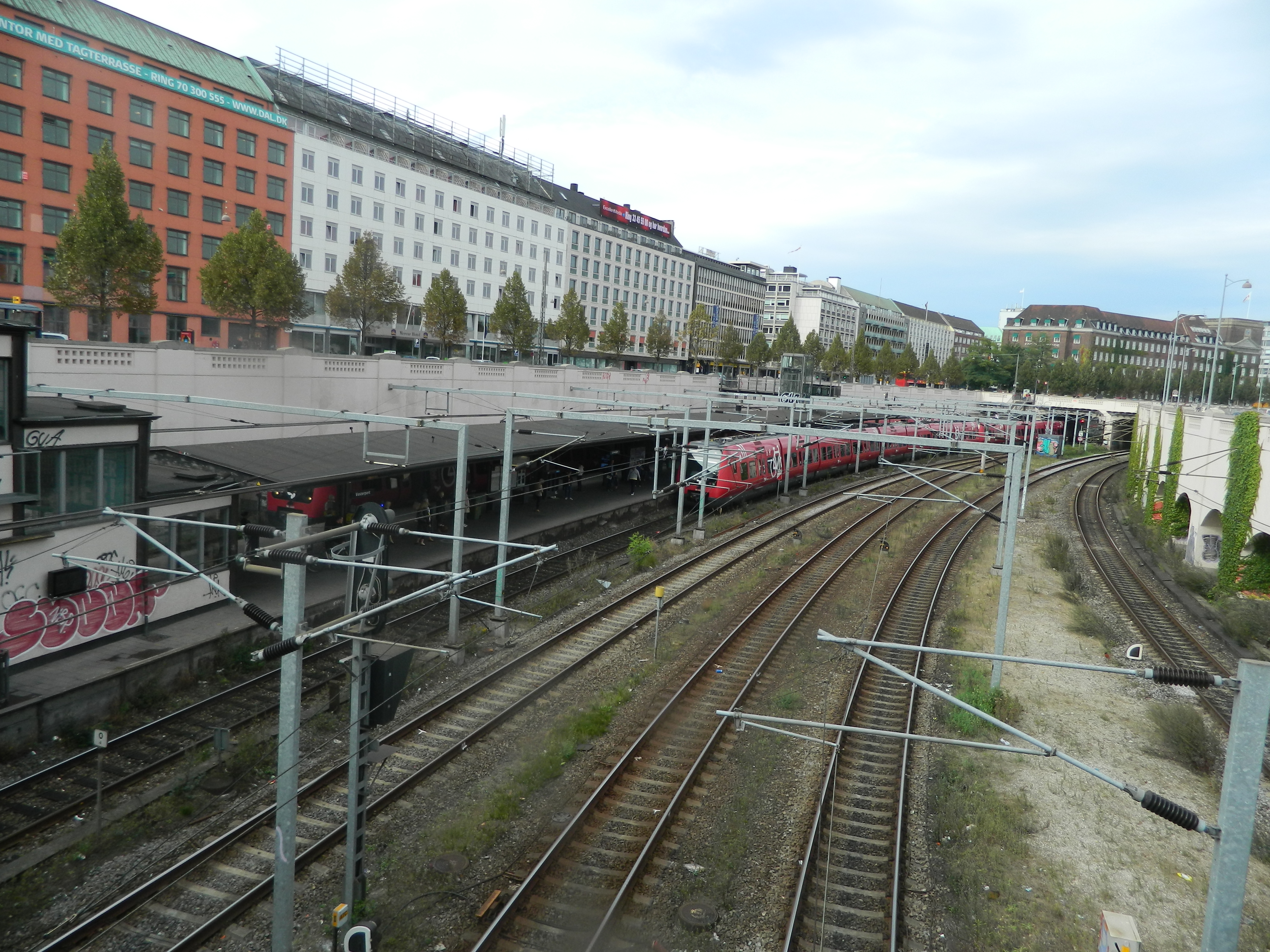
Vesterport station is located below street level, but is not under ground. Other trains don't stop here, solely S-trains

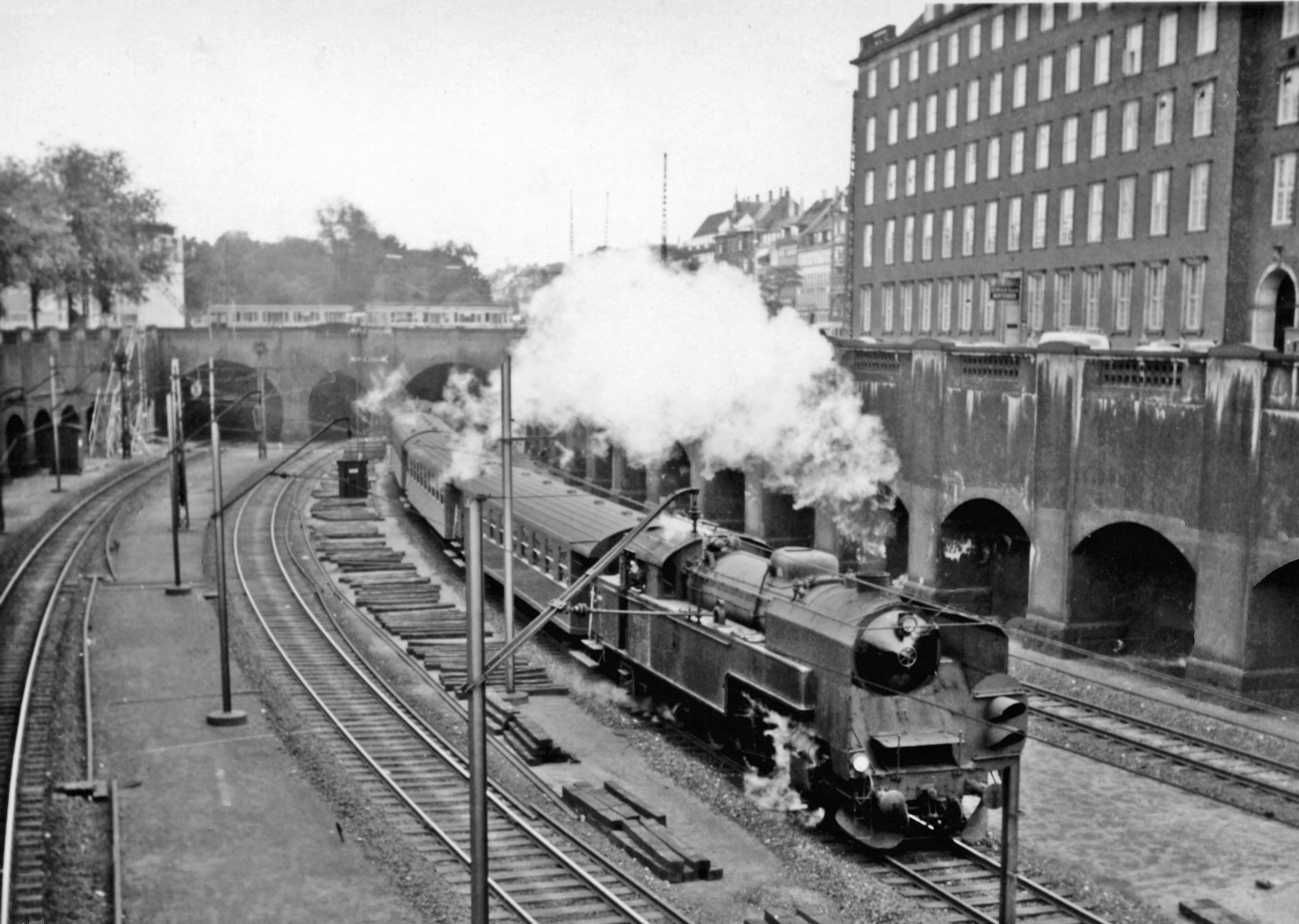
A DSB train passing Vesterport Station on the main line tracks in 1960

== See also ==
- List of Copenhagen Metro stations
- List of Copenhagen S-train stations
- List of railway stations in Denmark
- Rail transport in Denmark
- History of rail transport in Denmark
- Transportation in Copenhagen
- Transportation in Denmark
- Danish State Railways
- Banedanmark
