= Frederiksberg station =

Copenhagen metro station

Frederiksberg
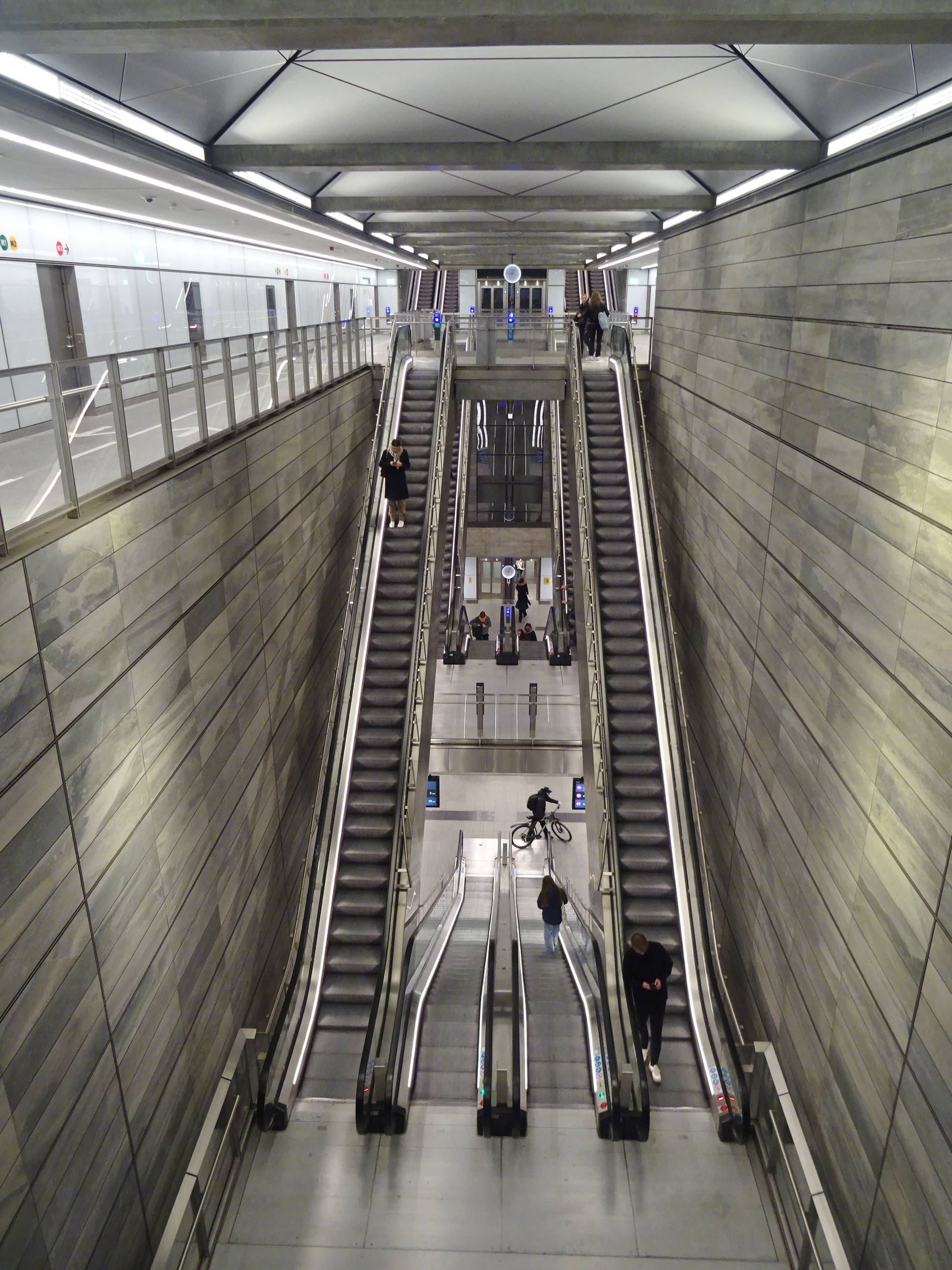

General information
- Location: 2D Solbjergvej/6 Sylows Allé; 2000 Frederiksberg
- Coordinates: 55°40′52.3″N 12°31′56″E
- System: Copenhagen Metro Station
- Owner: Metroselskabet
- Platforms: 2 island platforms
- Tracks: 2 (M1 & M2); 2 (M3)
- Bus routes: 18, 37, 74

Construction
- Structure type: Underground
- Platform levels: 2
- Accessible: Yes

Other information
- Station code: Fb
- Fare zone: 1 and 2

History
- Opened: 2003

Passengers
- 2018: 13,000 per weekday (M1 & M2)
Location
- Location within Copenhagen Location within Greater Copenhagen Location within Denmark

Frederiksberg station is an underground Copenhagen Metro station located at Falkonér Plads, off Falkonér Allé, in the Frederiksberg district of Copenhagen, Denmark. The station is an interchange station between the M1/M2 and M3 lines and is in fare zone 2. Nearby landmarks include Frederiksberg Centret, Falkoner Center, Frederiksberg Gymnasium, Frederiksberg Central Library and Copenhagen Business School's Solbjerg Campus.

== History ==
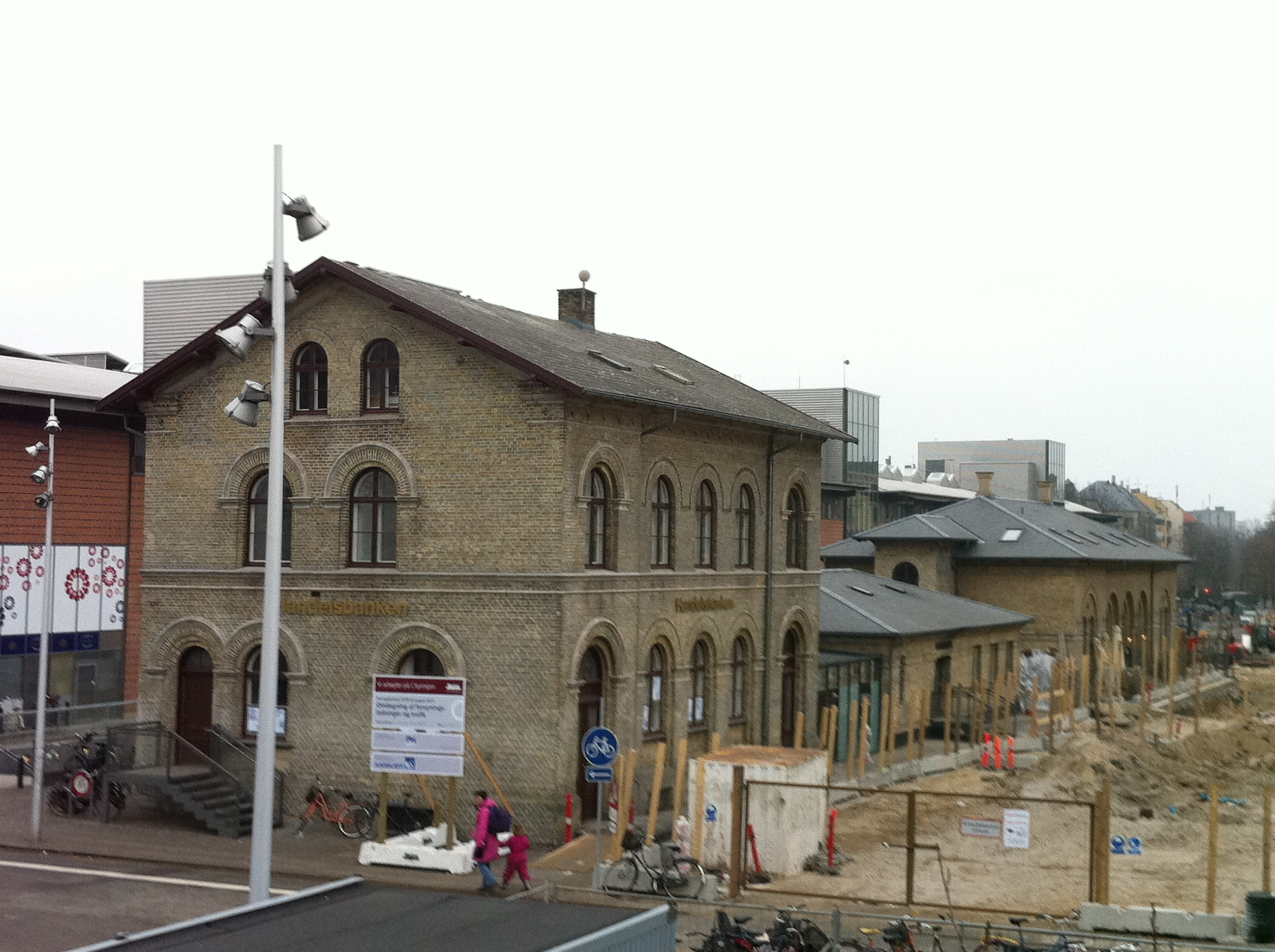
The former Frederiksberg railway station.

Frederiksberg station opened on 17 October 1864 as an intermediate station on the main line between Copenhagen and Roskilde when the inner portion of that line was relocated from Copenhagen's first station to the second central station at present-day Kampmannsgade, which also served North Line. West of Frederiksberg the line ran southwest to Vigerslev (near the present Danshøj station) from which it followed the current alignment towards Roskilde.

In 1879 a branch line towards Frederikssund opened and connected to the main line at Frederiksberg. Its innermost part followed what is now the route of the Metro between Frederiksberg and Vanløse. In 1896 a double-tracked connection for freight opened between Frederiksberg and North Line's station at Nørrebro (located at today's Nørrebroparken). Frederiksberg was now a sizeable railway junction with lines leaving in four directions. It grew to be a busy freight destination too, particularly with deliveries of fresh milk to several dairies located at Nyelandsvej north of the station.

In 1911, Copenhagen Central Station was relocated once more, to its present position. The new main line did not pass Frederiksberg, and for some years Frederiksberg had no passenger service at all. Following local protests, a modest passenger service was reestablished from 1914, in the form of a few shuttle trains a day to and from Vanløse. Throughout this period, freight traffic through Frederiksberg remained high, as the new central station was for passenger trains only. All freight towards destinations north of Copenhagen still passed through Frederiksberg on the old mainline from Vigerslev and the connecting curve to Nørrebro.

The transiting freight disappeared in 1930 when the Ring Line opened. The lines to Vigerslev and Nørrebro closed, (except for the first few hundred meters of the Vigerslev line, which served as stabling tracks for S-trains until around 1995), and Frederiksberg was now a dead-end station with only the line towards Vanløse left. It was still an important freight station, so the line to Vanløse was doubled and acquired a complex junction with the ring line.

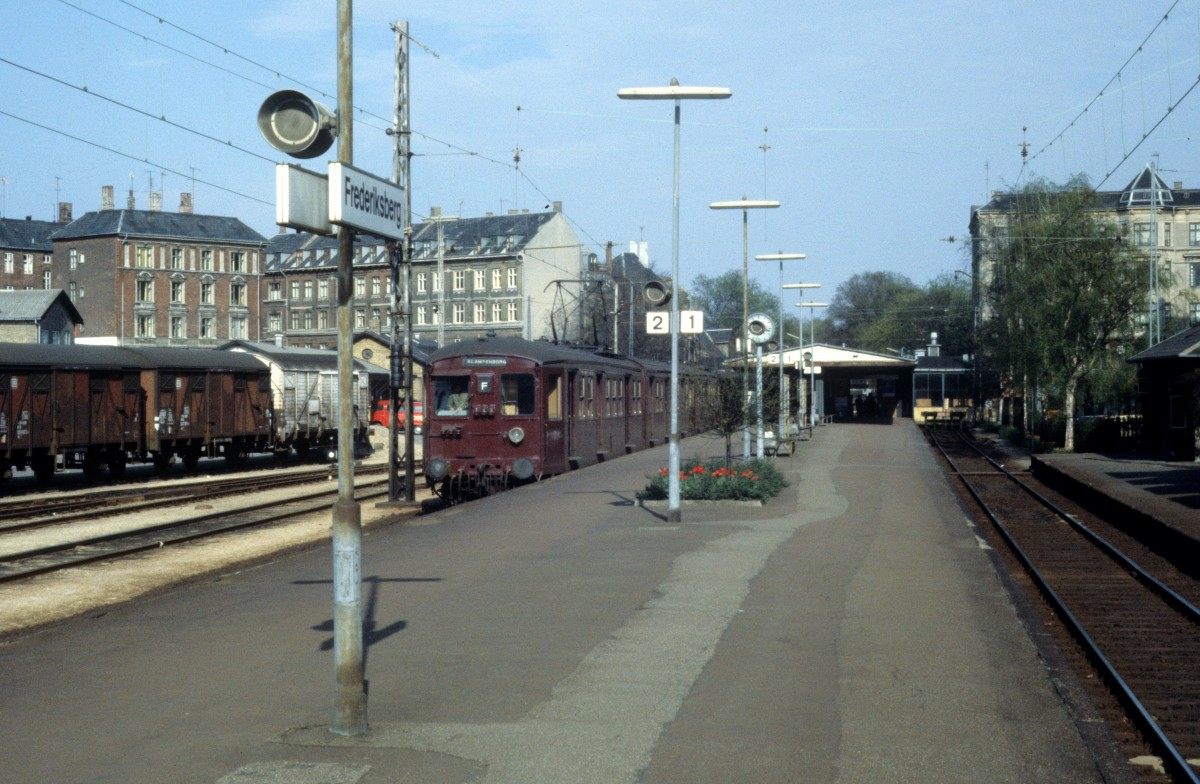
Frederiksberg station in 1978 with S-train on the F-line.

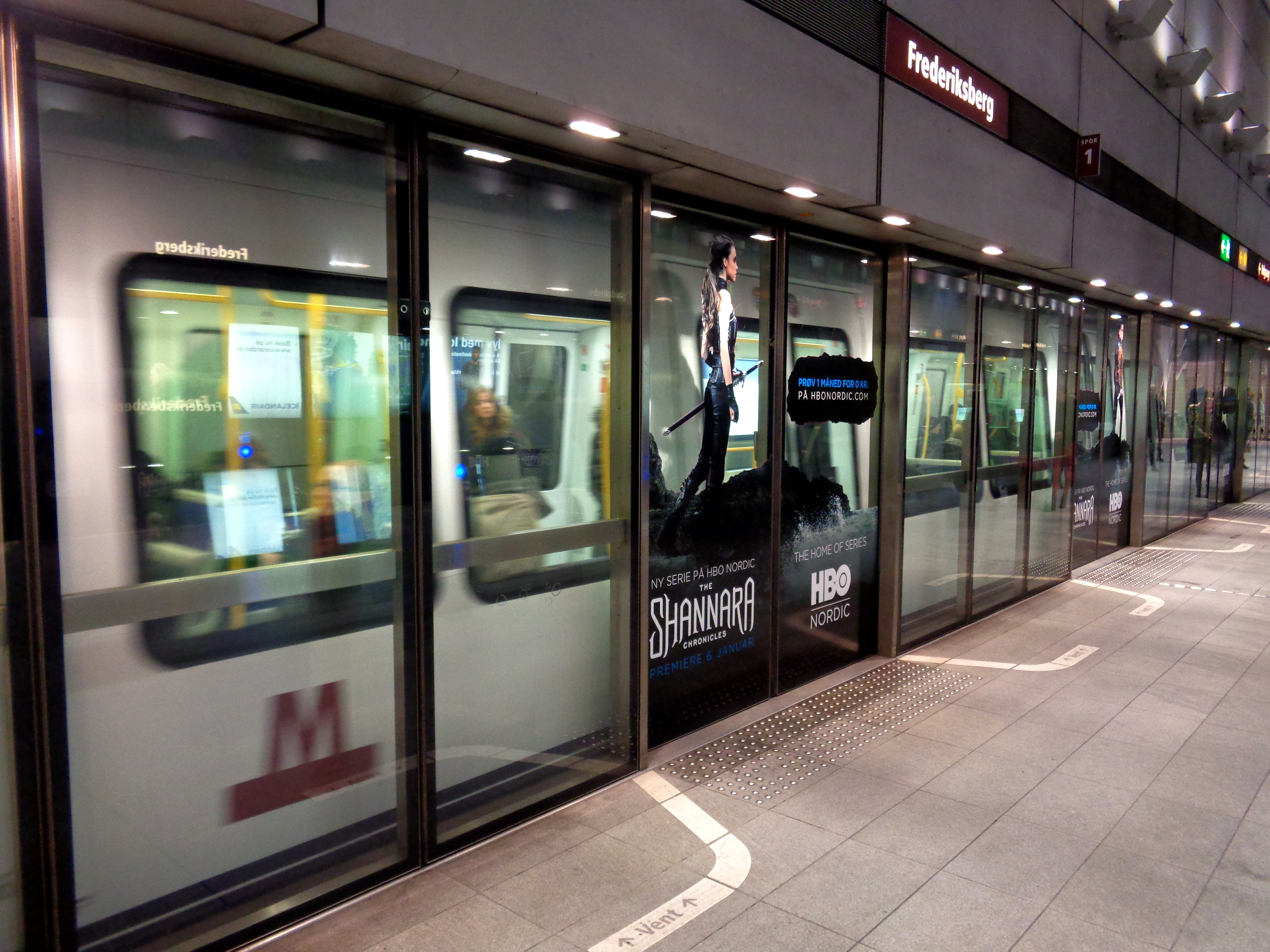
Frederiksberg Metro Station in Copenhagen

In 1934 the passenger service to Frederiksberg received a significant upgrade when the line to Vanløse was electrified and Frederiksberg became the terminus of Copenhagen's first S-train line. New platform tracks and a new station building with main entrance from Falkoner Allé were built for the S-trains.

After 1934 Frederiksberg had a quiet existence until the 1990s when it was decided that the line between Frederiksberg and Vanløse would form part of Copenhagen's first Metro line. The once large freight volume had dwindled to nothing over the decades, and the large freight track area was sold off for commercial development; the Frederiksbergcentret shopping mall now occupies most of the former freight area. Around 1995 the 1934 station building was demolished to make way for the mall construction, and the S-trains terminated at a temporary platform just west of the mall until 20 June 1998 when S-train service to Frederiksberg ceased permanently. Subsequently, the current underground Metro station was constructed; it opened on 19 May 2003.

The original 1864 station is a listed building and has survived both mall and metro construction, though not without causing engineering headaches as the metro tunnel passes very close to its foundations.

== Transport links ==
Bus routes 18, 37, 71, and 74 serve the station.

== Service ==
Preceding station	Copenhagen Metro	Following station
Fasanvej towards Vanløse	M1	Forum towards Vestamager
Fasanvej towards Vanløse	M2	Forum towards Lufthavnen
Aksel Møllers Have clockwise	M3	Frederiksberg Allé counter-clockwise
