= Islands Brygge station =

Copenhagen metro station

Islands Brygge
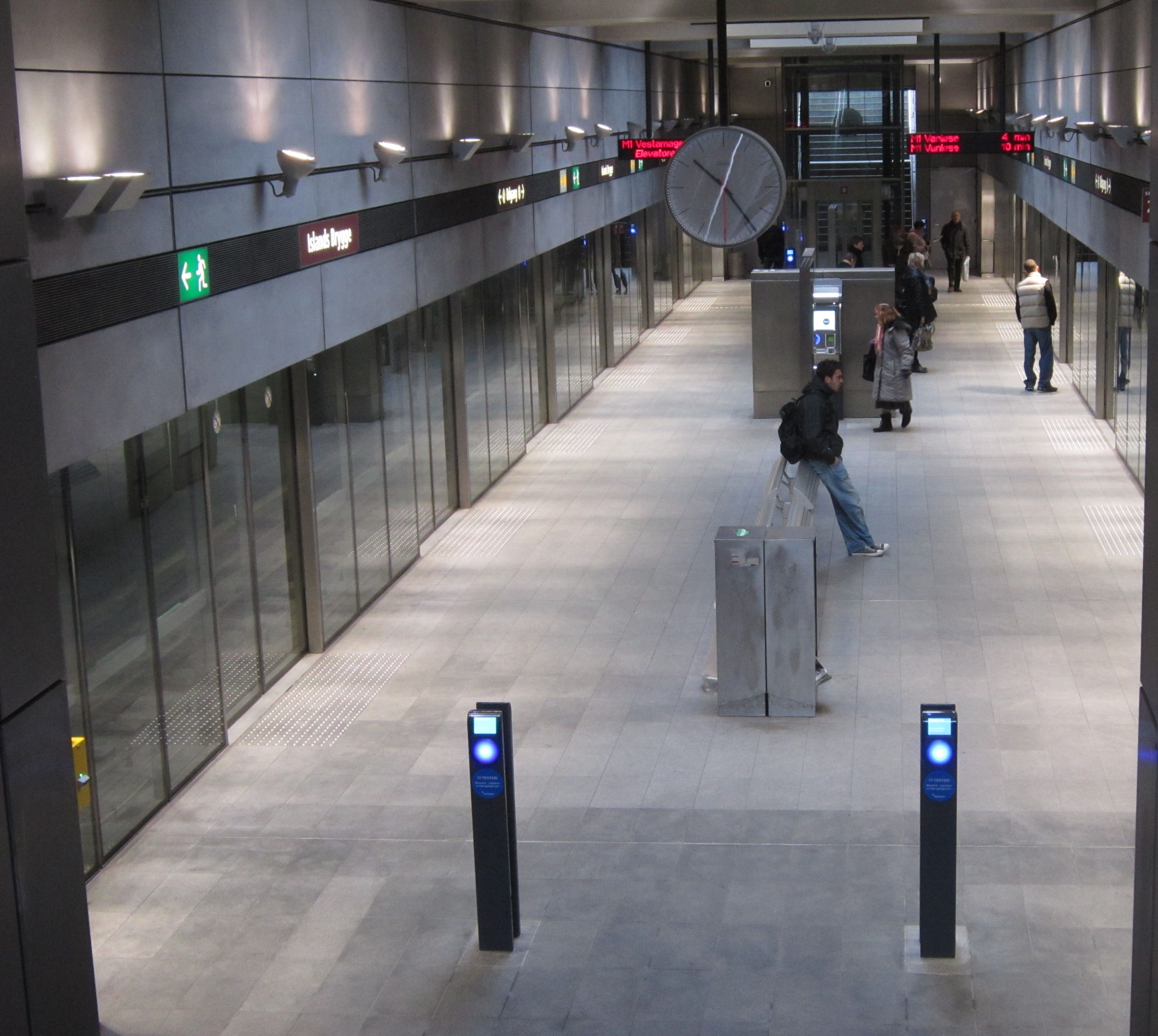

General information
- Location: Njalsgade 70, 2300 Copenhagen S Copenhagen Municipality
- Coordinates: 55°39′48″N 12°35′6.6″E
- System: Copenhagen Metro station
- Owner: Metroselskabet
- Operator: Metro Service A/S
- Platforms: 1 island platform
- Tracks: 2
- Bus routes: 33, 77

Construction
- Structure type: Underground
- Cycle facilities: 100
- Accessible: Yes

Other information
- Station code: Isb
- Fare zone: 1

History
- Opened: 19 October 2002; 24 years ago

Services
Preceding station	Copenhagen Metro	Following station
Christianshavn towards Vanløse	M1	DR Byen towards Vestamager
Location
- Location within Copenhagen Location within Greater Copenhagen Location within Denmark

Islands Brygge station (lit. Icelandic Quays) is a rapid transit station of the Copenhagen Metro in Copenhagen, Denmark. The first station on the M1 Line after its split from the M2 Line at Christianshavn, it is located in zone 1 in the northwestern section of the island of Amager.

== Location ==
Islands Brygge station is situated in the rapidly evolving Islands Brygge area in the very northern part of the Ørestad redevelopment area, termed Ørestad Nord. Specifically, the station lies below Ørestads Boulevard at its intersection with Njalsgade. Nearby is Havneparken, a celebrated public park transformed from a former industrial site in 1984 with additions since then.

=== Transit-oriented development ===
As one of six stations within or bounding the Ørestad redevelopment area, Islands Brygge has witnessed significant transit-oriented development. Mostly educational in nature, nearby is the University of Copenhagen's Faculty of Humanities. Commercial development in the area includes Metropolitain, a 9,500 square metres (102,000 sq ft) office and shopping complex was opened in 2010.

== Station layout ==
Like all Copenhagen Metro stations, Islands Brygge has an island platform setup with two tracks.

⇐ M1 towards Vestamager ⇐
(Platform Edge Doors)
Island Platform
(Platform Edge Doors)
⇒ M1 towards Vanløse ⇒
