= Marmorkirken station =

Metro station in Copenhagen, Denmark

Coordinates: 55.6853°N 12.5887°E

Marmorkirken
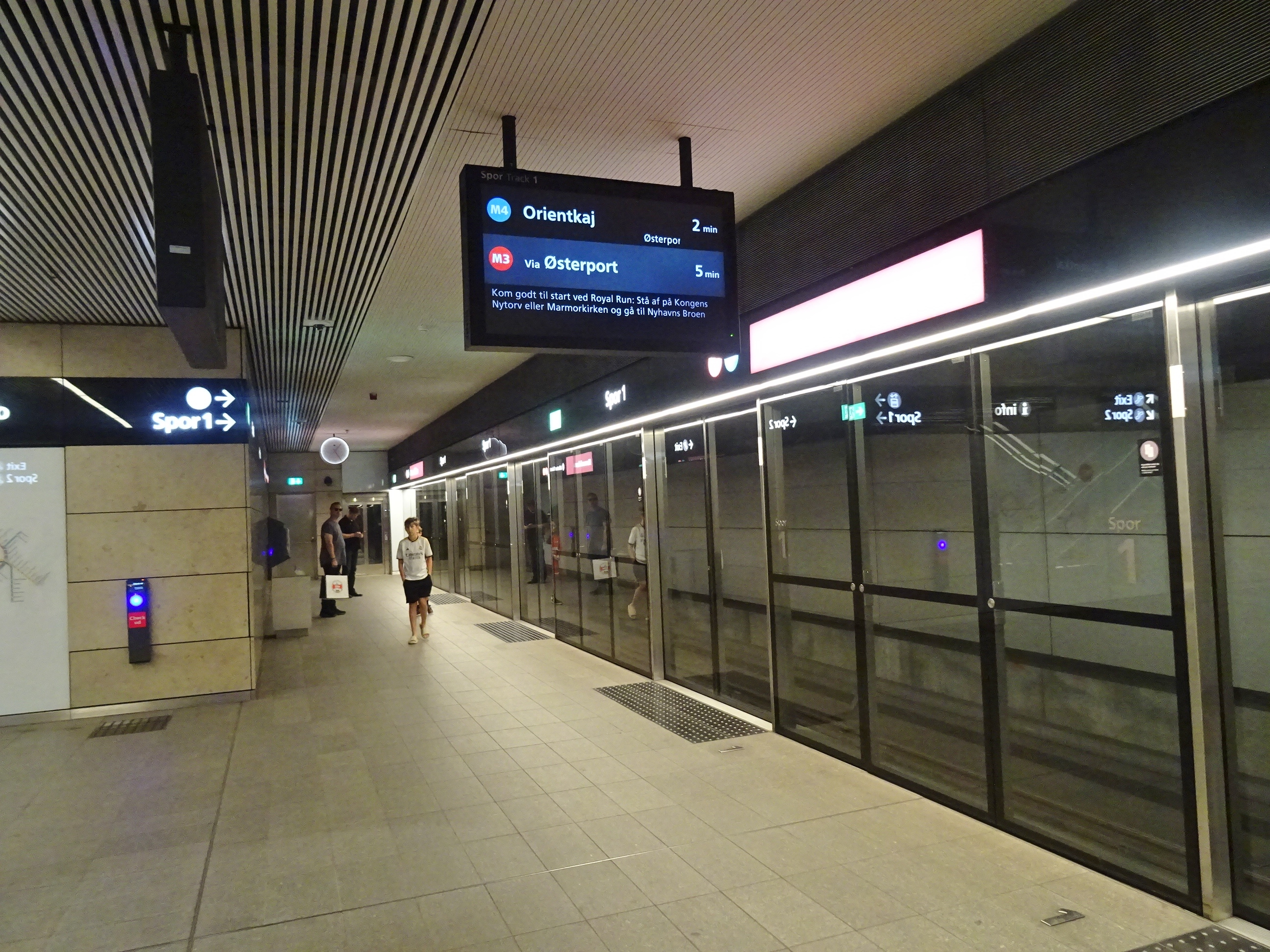

General information
- Location: Frederiksgade; 1265 Copenhagen K
- System: Copenhagen Metro rapid transit station
- Owner: Metroselskabet
- Platforms: 2 split-level side platforms
- Tracks: 2

Construction
- Structure type: Underground
- Depth: 30 m (98 ft)
- Accessible: yes

Other information
- Station code: Mmk
- Fare zone: 1

History
- Opened: 29 September 2019; 7 years ago
Location
- Location within Copenhagen Location within Greater Copenhagen Location within Denmark

Marmorkirken station (lit. Marble Church) is an underground Copenhagen Metro station located at the Marble Church, facing Bredgade, in downtown Copenhagen, Denmark. The station is on the City Circle Line (M3 and M4 lines), between Østerport and Kongens Nytorv, and is in fare zone 1. Marmorkirken is unique in its design in that it is the only station on the Copenhagen Metro where the platforms for the two tracks are at different levels, unlike the island platform design used at every other station. This design was chosen to avoid excavating underneath, and risk compromising, the foundations of the Marble Church. With the lower platform at 30 meters beneath street level, it is also the deepest station of all stations on the Copenhagen Metro.

== History ==
The station was opened on 29 September 2019 along with the rest of the City Circle Line. Upon opening, Metroselskabet is anticipated to serve around 10,000 passengers per weekday.

== Service ==
Preceding station	Copenhagen Metro	Following station
Kongens Nytorv clockwise	M3	Østerport counter-clockwise
Kongens Nytorv towards Copenhagen South	M4	Østerport towards Orientkaj
