= Kasongo (name) =

Kasongo is a Congolese name that may refer to

Given name

- Jean-Kasongo Banza (born 1974), Congolese football player
- Kasongo Ilunga, Congolese politician
- Kasongo Munganga, Congolese politician and monetarist
- Kasongo, Kenyan politician

Surname

- Belux Bukasa Kasongo (born 1979), Congolese football player
- Joseph Kasongo, Congolese politician
- Kabwe Kasongo (born 1970), Congolese football player
- Kabongo Kasongo (born 1994), Congolese football player
- Ngandu Kasongo (born 1979), Congolese football player
- Pierre Mwana Kasongo (born 1938), Congolese football player
