= Kasongo Airport =

- IATA: none; ICAO: FZOK

Summary
- Airport type: Public
- Serves: Kasongo
- Elevation AMSL: 1,785 ft / 544 m
- Coordinates: 4°31′25″S 26°36′00″E

Map
- Location of the airport in Democratic Republic of the Congo

Runways
Direction	Length		Surface
Direction	m	ft	Surface
13/31	955	3,133	Grass
- Sources: Google Maps GCM

Kasongo Airport (ICAO: FZOK) is an airport serving the town of Kasongo in Maniema Province, Democratic Republic of the Congo. The runway is 2 kilometres (1.2 mi) southwest of Kasongo.

There is also Kasongo Lunda Airport 1,110 kilometres (690 mi) west of Kasongo Airport, near the border with Angola. Some sources have the two airports conflated.

== See also ==
- Transport in the Democratic Republic of the Congo
- List of airports in the Democratic Republic of the Congo
