= M1 (Copenhagen Metro) =

Metro line in Copenhagen, Denmark

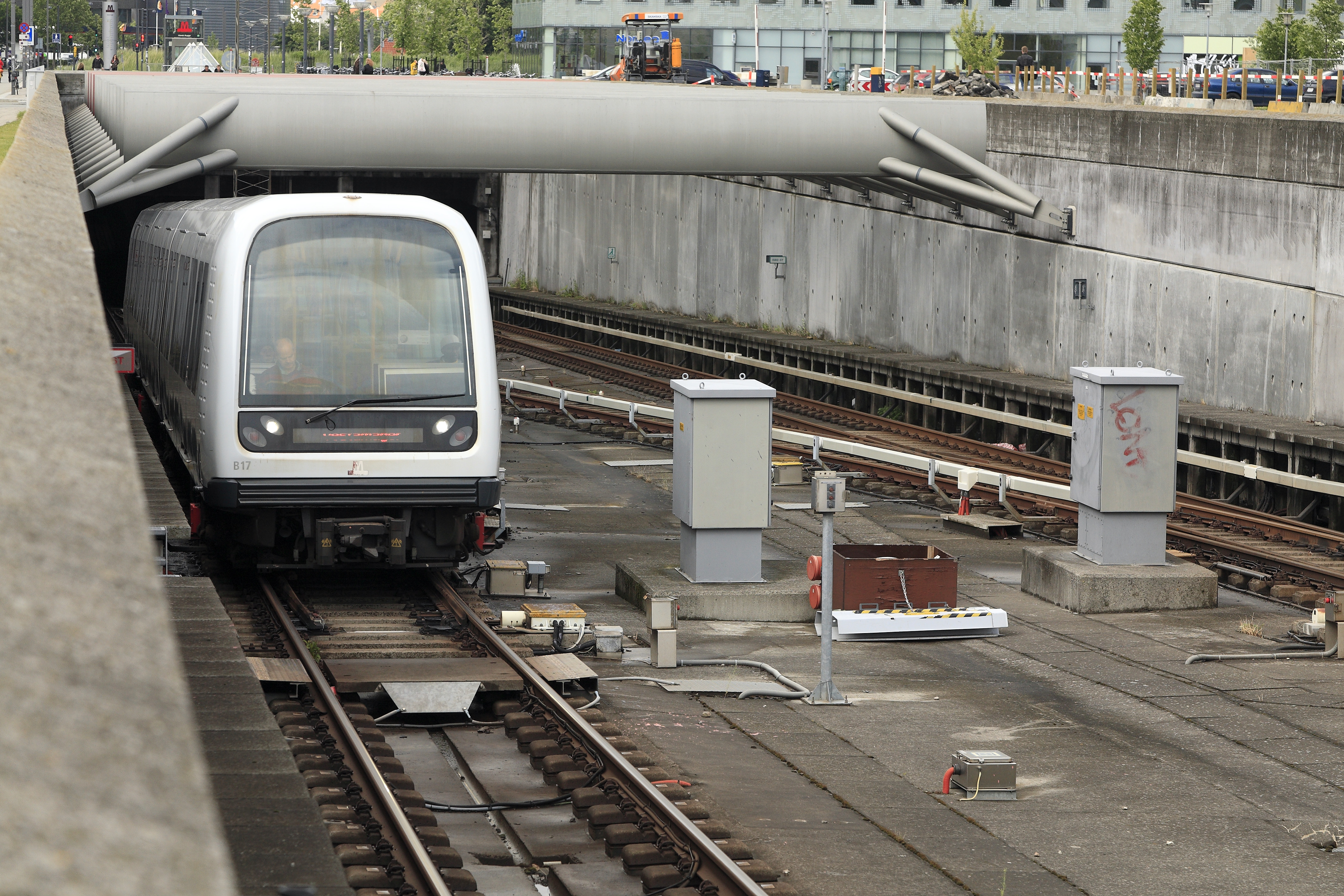
- M1 train exiting the tunnel south of Islands Brygge station

Overview
- Owner: Metroselskabet
- Locale: Copenhagen, Denmark
- Termini: Vestamager; Vanløse
- Stations: 15

Service
- Type: Rapid transit
- System: Copenhagen Metro
- Operator: Metro Service
- Depot: Vestamager

History
- Opened: 19 October 2002; 23 years ago
- Last extension: 2003

Technical
- Line length: 14.3 km (8.9 mi)
- Number of tracks: Double
- Character: Elevated and Underground
- Track gauge: 1,435 mm (4 ft 8 1/2 in) standard gauge
- Electrification: 750 V DC third rail
Route map

M1 of the Copenhagen Metro, colored green on the map, runs from Vanløse to Vestamager. It connects the Ørestad neighborhood of Copenhagen, Denmark, to the city center. The line is elevated while traveling through Ørestad, while it runs through a tunnel below the city center. From Christianshavn to Vanløse, the line is shared with M2.

== History ==
The background for the metro was the urban development of the Ørestad area of Copenhagen. The principal of building a rail transit was passed by the Parliament of Denmark on 24 June 1992, with the Ørestad Act. The responsibility for developing the area, as well as building and operating the metro, was given to the Ørestad Development Corporation, a joint venture between Copenhagen Municipality (45%) and the Ministry of Finance (55%). Initially, three modes of transport were considered: a tramway, a light rail and a rapid transit. In October 1994, the Development Corporation chose a light rapid transit system.

The decision to build stage 2, from Nørreport to Vanløse was made by parliament on 21 December 1994. Stage 2 involved the establishment of the company Fredriksbergbaneselskapet I/S in February 1995, owned 70% by the Ørestad Development Corporation and 30% by Fredriksberg Municipality. In October 1996, a contract was signed with the Copenhagen Metro Construction Group (COMET) for building the lines, and with Ansaldo for delivery of the trains and operating the system for the first five years. COMET is a consortium comprised Astaldi, Bachy, SAE, Ilbau, NCC Rasmussen & Schiøtz Anlæg and Tarmac Construction.

Construction started in November 1996, with the moving of underground pipes and wires around the station areas. In August 1997, construction started at the depot, and in September, COMET started the first mainline construction work. In October and November, the two tunnel boring machines (TBM), christened Liva and Bette, were delivered. They started digging each barrel of the tunnel from Islands Brygge in February 1998. The same month, the Public Transport Authority gave the necessary permits to operate a driverless metro. The section between Fasanvej and Frederiksberg is a former S-train line, and was last operated as such on 20 June 1998.

The first section of tunnel was completed by September 1998, and the TBMs moved to Havnegade. By December 1998, work had started on all the initial nine stations. Plans for M2 were presented to the public in April 1999, with a debate emerging if the proposed elevated solution is the best. In May, the first trains were delivered, and trial runs began at the depot. In December, the tunnels were completed to Strandlodsvej, and the TBMs were moved to Havnegade, where they started to grind towards Frederiksberg. From 1 January 2000, the S-train service from Solbjerg to Vanløse was terminated, and work to rebuild to metro started. By February 2001, all tunnels were finished.

On 6 November 2001, the first train operates through a tunnel section. On 28 November, laying of tracks along stage 1 and stage 2A completed. An agreement about financing stage 3 was reached on 12 April. By 22 May, the 18 delivered trains had test-run 100,000 kilometers (60,000 mi). The section from Nørreport to Lergravsparken and Vesterport was opened on 19 October 2002. Initially, the system had a 12-minute headway on each of the two services. From 3 December this was reduced to 9 minutes, and from 19 December to 6 minutes. Operation of the system was subcontracted to Ansaldo, who again subcontracted it to Metro Service, a subsidiary of Serco. The contract had a duration of five years, with an option for extension for another three.

Trial runs on the next section of metro, stage 2A from Nørreport to Frederiksberg, began on 24 February. It opened on 29 May 2003. All changes to bus and tin schedules in Copenhagen took place on 25 May, but to allow Queen Margrethe II to open the line, the opening needed to be adapted to her calendar. This caused four days without a bus service along the line. Stage 2B, from Frederiksberg to Vanløse, opened on 12 October. Forum Station was nominated for the European Union Prize for Contemporary Architecture in 2005. In 2007, the Ørestad Development Corporation was discontinued, and the ownership of the metro was transferred to Metroselskabet I/S.

== Route ==

M1 starts at Vanløse, where there is transfer to the S-train's lines C and H. The line starts elevated and is located in fare zone 2. The borough of Vanløse is mostly a residential area. The line then runs into the enclave municipality of Frederiksberg, running parallel to the Frederikssund Line of the S-train. At Flintholm, there is transfer to the C, F and H-lines of the S-train. Flintholm is the country's third-largest public transport hub. The station is located at the Grøndal Park, and is the borderline between the urban and suburban Copenhagen. The area around Lindevang is a redeveloped industrial area, that now is mostly residential, in addition to hosting the Copenhagen Business School.

After Lindevang, the line dives into the tunnel that it follows through the city center. At Fasanvej is another campus of the Copenhagen Business School. Frederiksberg serves the center of the municipality, that in addition to many public offices and cultural facilities, serves the University of Copenhagen's Frederiksberg Campus and another campus of the Copenhagen Business School. The station is located in both fare zone 1 and 2. Frederiksberg became a transfer station to M3 when the City Circle Line was opened on 29 September 2019. Forum is the last station in Frederiksberg Municipality, but located only a few blocks from the Copenhagen borough of Nørrebro. The Forum area is a residential area from the 1930s and 1940, built in functionalism, and hosts the Royal Danish Academy of Music.

Nørreport lies within Indre By—the city center of Copenhagen. It is the main intersection with DSB's intercity and regional trains, as well as the S-train, serving lines A, B, C, E and H. Kongens Nytorv lies at the heart of the commercial and cultural center of Copenhagen. When the City Circle Line opened, the station serves as the transfer to lines M3 and M4. Christianshavn is located on an island, a former navy base that has been redeveloped into residential and commercial mix. It is the last station served by both lines, with M1 branching off towards Islands Brygge.

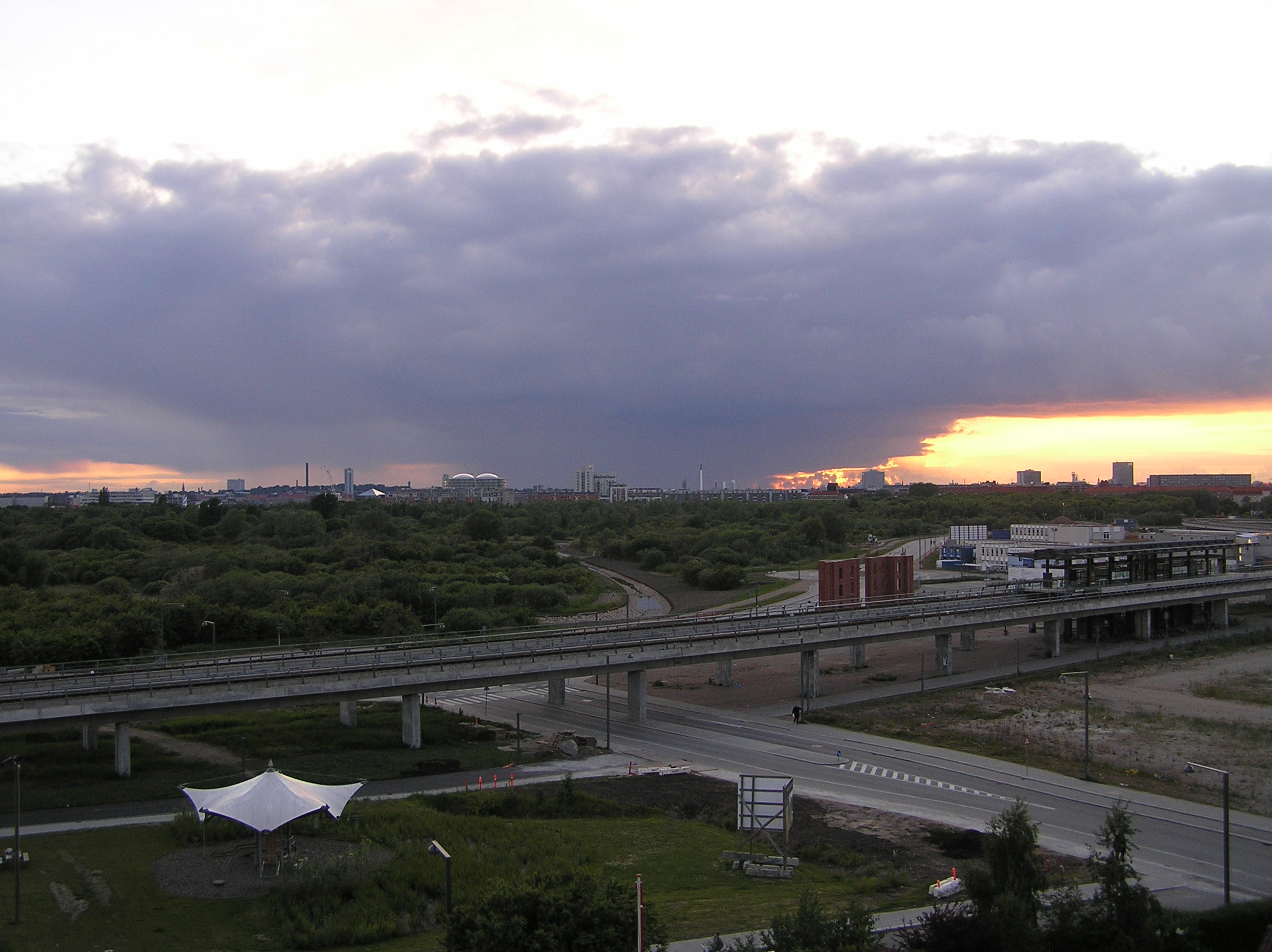
DR Byen

Islands Brygge is the first station to lay within the redeveloped area of Ørestad. Located in the borough of Amager Vest, it is located adjacent to the Faculty of Humanities of the University of Copenhagen and the IT University of Copenhagen. The station is the last located underground. DR Byen is located at the southern end of the campus. It is named for DR Byen, the headquarters of the national broadcaster DR. Copenhagen Concert Hall is located adjacent to the station. Sundby is located close to a large recreational area to the west, a residential to the east and the psychiatric division of Amager Hospital.

Bella Center is located in a traditional housing area, but is also adjacent to Scandinavia's largest convention center, Bella Center. Ørestad is located in the heart of the new urban development area. In addition to numerous corporate offices and educational institutions, the area hosts Field's, the Nordic Countries' largest shopping center. The metro station is located above the DSB regional Oresundtrain station, that has international services to Sweden. Vestamager is the terminus of M1. It is located close to the Kalvebod Commons.

== Service ==
The system operates continually (24/7) with a varying headway throughout the day. During rush hour (07–10 and 15–18), there is a four-minute headway. During Thursday through Saturday night (24–05), the headway is fifteen minutes, and other nights it is twenty minutes on all sections of the metro. At all other times, there is a six-minute headway. On the section shared with M2, there is half the headway (except during night on weekdays). Travel time along the whole line is 23 minutes, with the section from Vestamager to Nørreport taking 14 minutes and from Nørreport to Vanløse taking 9 minutes.

Two stations, one north and one south of Ørestad, are planned and will be opened when Ørestad is fully developed. They will be located approximately halfway between Bella Center and Ørestad, and Ørestad and Vestamager. Possible names are Ørestad Nord and Ørestad Syd.
