= Kasongo Lunda Airport =

- IATA: KGN; ICAO: none

Summary
- Airport type: Public
- Serves: Kasongo Lunda
- Elevation AMSL: 1,689 ft / 515 m
- Coordinates: 6°28′05″S 16°48′20″E

Map
- Location of the airport in Democratic Republic of the Congo

Runways
Direction	Length		Surface
Direction	ft	m	Surface
10/28	2,265	690	Grass
- Sources: Google Maps GCM

Kasongo Lunda Airport (IATA: KGN) is an airport serving the town of Kasongo Lunda in Kwango Province, Democratic Republic of the Congo.

There is also a Kasongo Airport (ICAO: FZOK) 1,110 kilometres (690 mi) east of Kasongo Lunda, near the town of Kasongo in Maniema Province, Democratic Republic of the Congo.

== See also ==
- Transport in the Democratic Republic of the Congo
- List of airports in the Democratic Republic of the Congo
