= Parks and open spaces in Copenhagen =

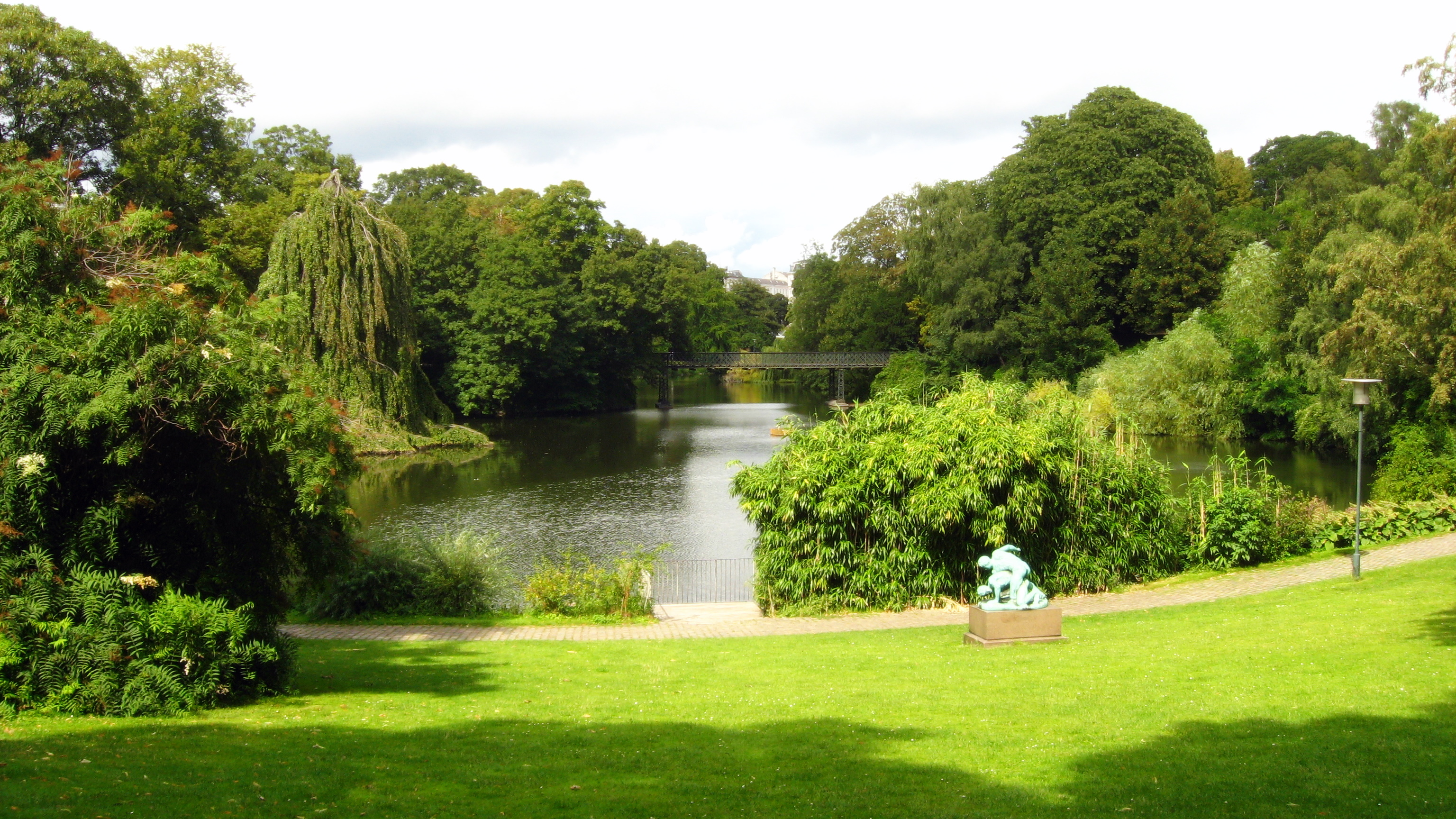
Ørstedsparken

Copenhagen is a green city well endowed with open spaces. It has an extensive and well-distributed system of parks that act as venues for events and urban life. As a supplement to the regular parks, there are a number of congenial public gardens and some cemeteries doubling as parks. It is official municipal policy in Copenhagen that all citizens by 2015 must be able to reach a park or beach on foot in less than 15 minutes.

== Parks ==
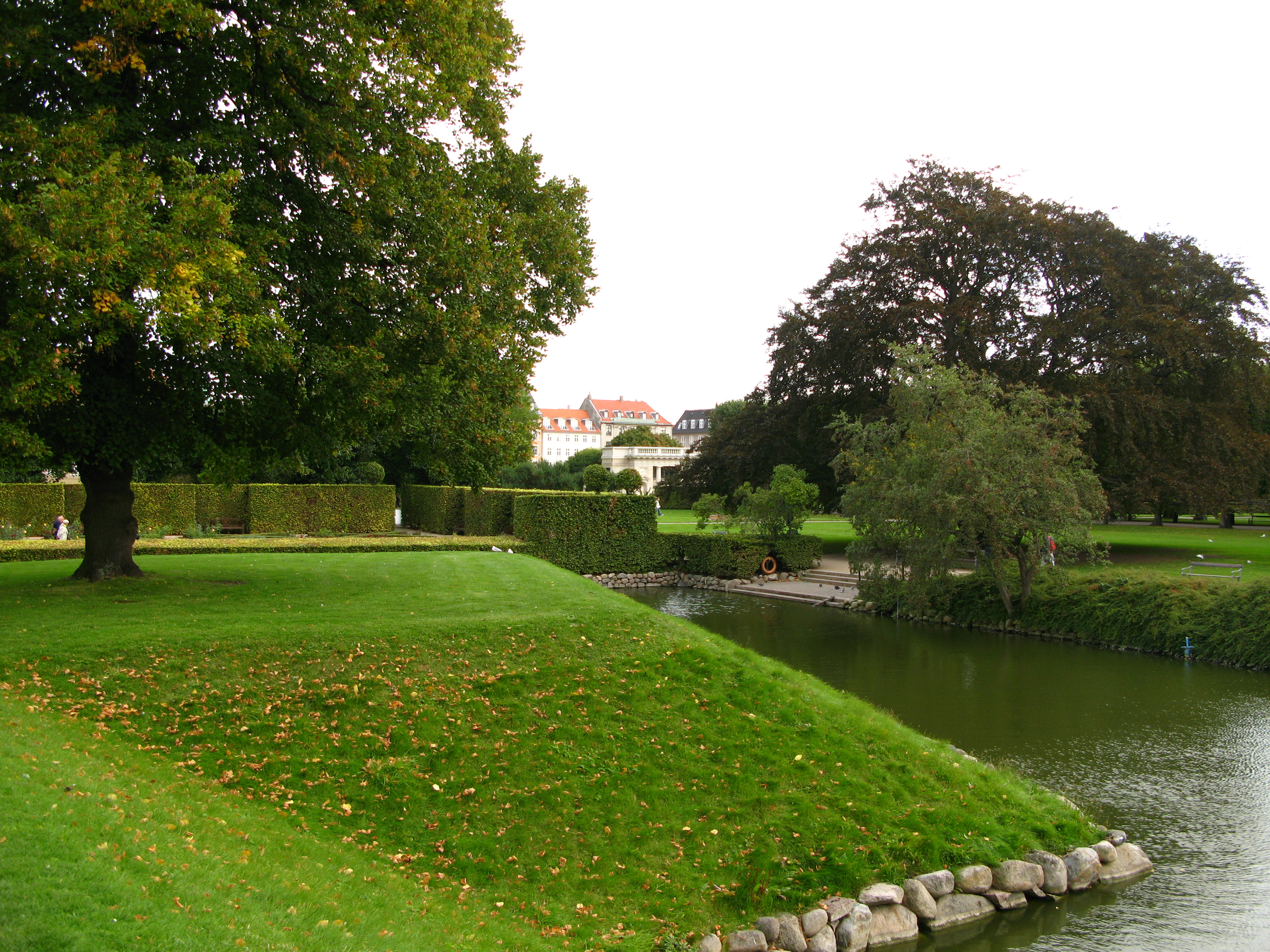
The Hercules Pavilion seen from the distance

King's Garden (55.6852°N 12.5799°E), the garden of Rosenborg Castle, is the oldest and most visited park in Copenhagen. Its landscaping was commenced by Christian IV in 1606. Every year it sees more than 2.5 million visitors, and in the summer months it is packed with sunbathers, picknickers and ballplayers. It also serves as a sculpture garden with a permanent display of sculptures as well as temporary exhibits during summer. Just north of King's Garden a series of parks make up a green strand running right through the centre of the city. These are constructed on the old ramparts of the city and include Østre Anlæg (55.6906°N 12.5813°E) and Ørsted Park (55.6811°N 12.5663°E), as well as the Botanical Garden (55.6867°N 12.5736°E), which is particularly noted for a large complex of 19th-century greenhouses donated by Carlsberg founder J. C. Jacobsen.

Fælledparken (55.7023°N 12.5672°E) in the northern part of the city is, at 58 hectares, the largest park in Copenhagen. It is popular for sports and hosts an array of annual events, including a free opera concert at the opening of the opera season, other open-air concerts, carnival, Labour Day celebrations and the Copenhagen Historic Grand Prix, which is a race for antique cars. Another popular park is the Frederiksberg Gardens (55.6754°N 12.5257°E), which is a 32-hectare romantic landscape park. It houses a large colony of very tame grey herons along with other waterfowl. The park also offers views of the elephants and the elephant house, designed by the world-famous British architect Norman Foster, at the adjacent Copenhagen Zoo.

Some of Copenhagen's newer parks draw from their position by the water. Havneparken (55.6663°N 12.5754°E), established in 1995, covers 2.8 hectares of dockland in the Islands Brygge neighbourhood and has a bandstand roofed by an upside-down old wooden ship, as well as the first of Copenhagen's harbour baths. Amager Beach Park (55.6566°N 12.6411°E) was founded in 1934, but in 2005 a 2.4-kilometre-long artificial island was added, separated from the original beach by a lagoon crossed by three bridges.

It is official municipal policy in Copenhagen that all citizens by 2015 must be able to reach a park or beach on foot in less than 15 minutes. In line with this policy, several new parks are under development in areas poor in green spaces. One of those recently completed is Superkilen, an innovative park for the ethnic inhabitants of the Nørrebro district of Copenhagen.

== Public gardens ==
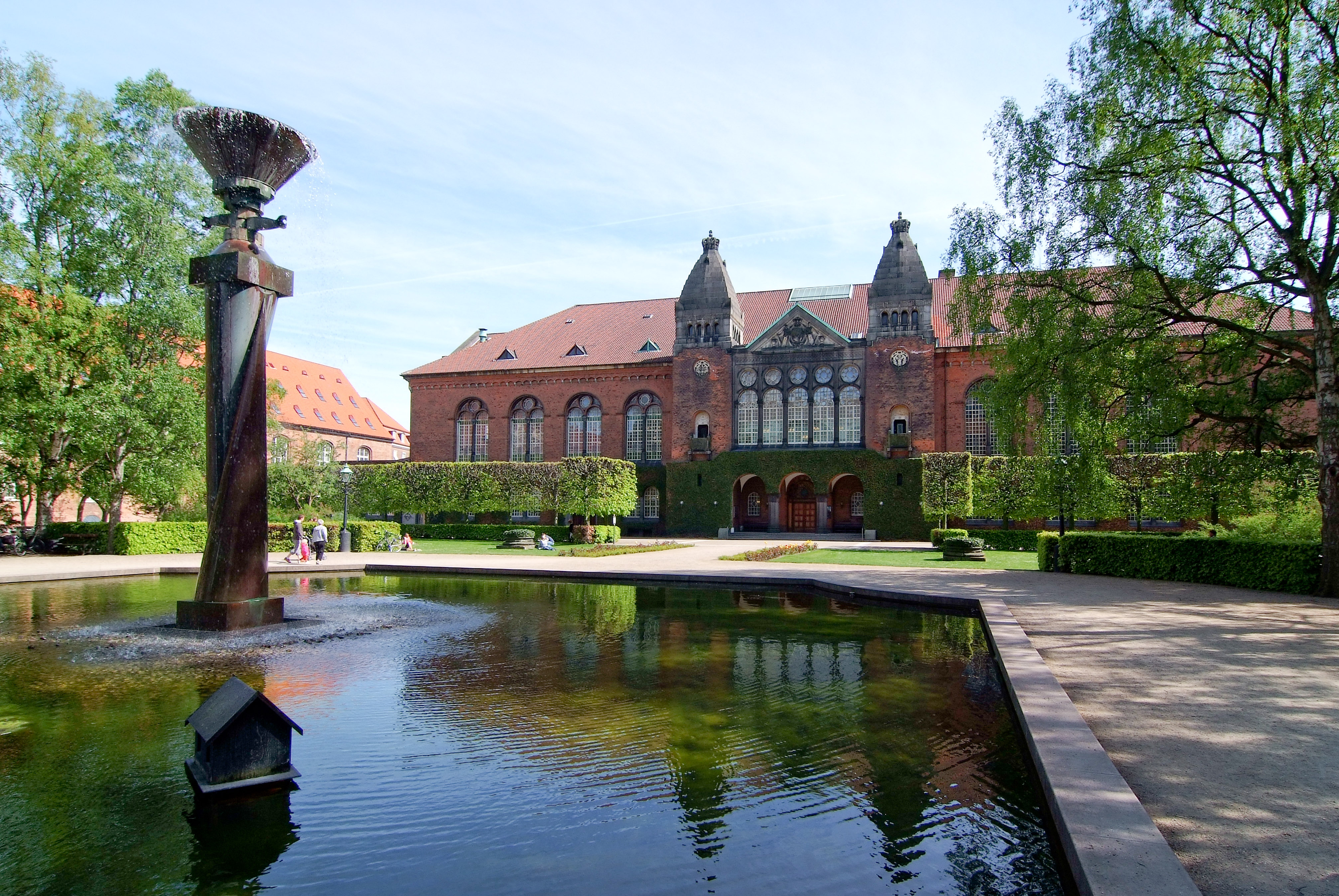
The building of The Royal Library, Denmark, on Slotsholmen which dates to 1906, viewed from the northwest

Besides the regular parks, a number of gardens open to the general public serve as important green spaces in central Copenhagen. These include:

- The Library Garden (55.6746°N 12.5813°E), the garden of the Royal Library on Slotsholmen, located between the library and Christiansborg Palace
- The Glyptoteque Garden (55.6721°N 12.5712°E), the small garden behind the Ny Carlsberg Glyptotek
- Grønnegården (55.6864°N 12.5935°E), the inner courtyard of the Museum of Art & Design
- The Carlsberg Academy Garden in the Carlsberg District (55.6644°N 12.5333°E), one of two historic gardens at the former brewery site. Now open to the public during daytime.

== Cemeteries ==
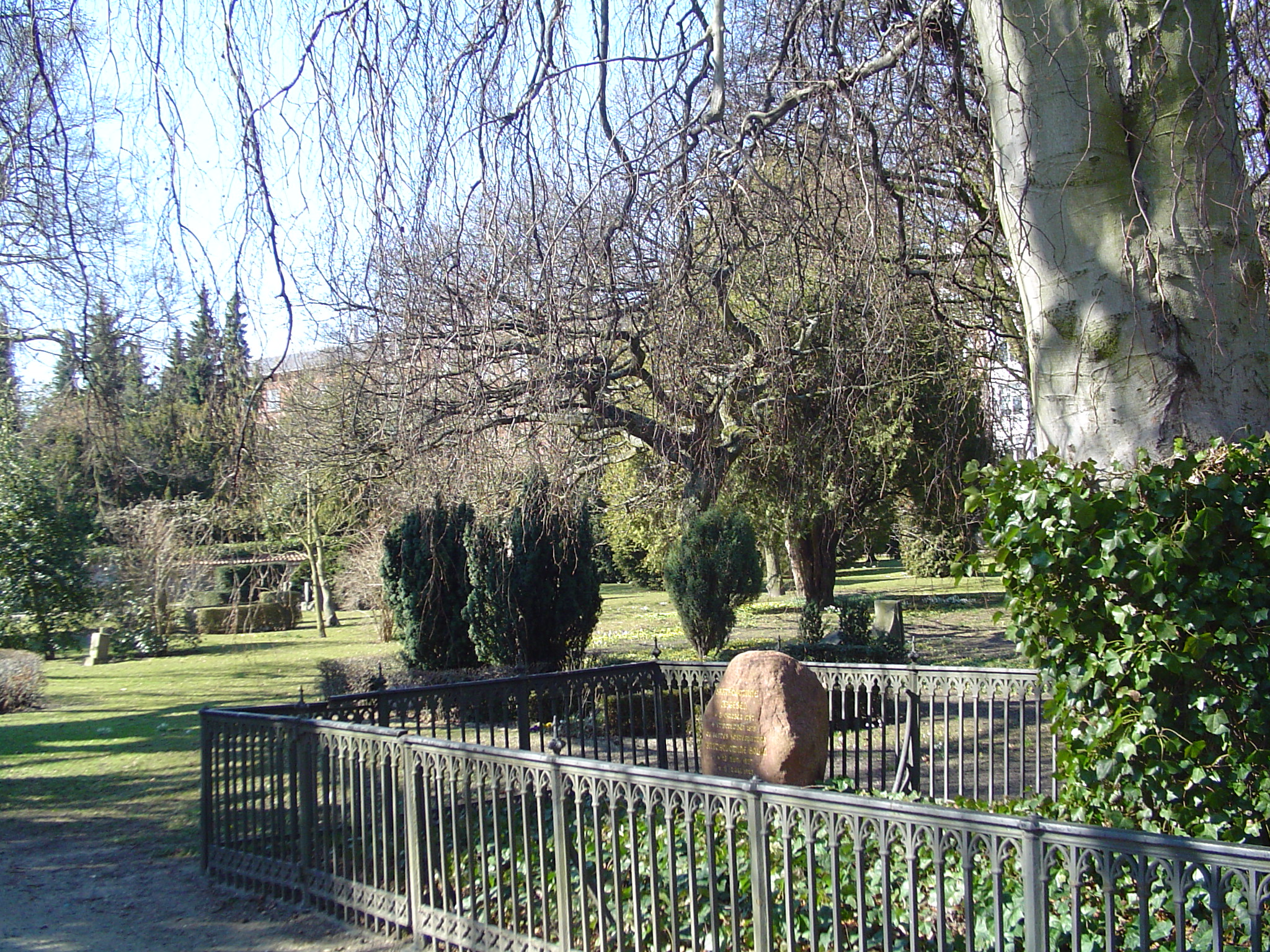
Inside the Assistens Cemetery

Characteristic of Copenhagen is that a number of cemeteries double as parks, though only for the more quiet activities such as sunbathing, reading and meditation. Assistens Cemetery (55.6912°N 12.5497°E), the burial place of Hans Christian Andersen among others, is an important green space for the district of Inner Nørrebro and a Copenhagen institution. The lesser-known Vestre Cemetery (55.6578°N 12.5294°E) is, at 54 hectares, the largest cemetery in Denmark and offers a maze of dense groves, open lawns, winding paths, hedges, overgrown tombs, monuments, tree-lined avenues, lakes and other garden features.

== Greenways ==
Copenhagen Municipality is developing a system of interconnected green bicycle routes, Greenways, with the aim to facilitate fast, safe and pleasant bicycle transport from one end of the city to the other. The network will cover more than 100 kilometres and consist of 22 routes when finished.

== Semi-natural areas ==
Eremitagesletten in August 2026

Some open spaces on the outskirts of Copenhagen have a more informal and semi-natural character, having originally been countryside areas protected against surrounding urbanisation. They include:

- Amager Common (55°39′0.65″N 12°34′41.78″E), is a 223 hectare protected area on Amager.
- Kalvebod Common (55.6086°N 12.5354°E), a 2,000-hectare protected area right next to the new business district of Ørestad. Its natural, slightly maintained parkland features a range of ecosystems, from young forests to tidal marshes; some areas are prevented from developing into forests by grazing livestock and game.
- Utterslev Mose (55.7173°N 12.5060°E), a 221-hectare area in the northwestern part of Copenhagen. Three lakes with extensive reed beds cover a total of 91 hectares and are surrounded by parkland.
- Deer Garden Forest Park (55.7984°N 12.5632°E), a 1,100-hectare nature area north of Copenhagen. The area is noted for its mixture of huge, ancient oak trees and large populations of red and fallow deer.
- Vestskoven (55.6925°N 12.3682°E), a 130-hectare forested area located west of Copenhagen, mainly in Albertslund Municipality
- Hareskoven (55.7702°N 12.4039°E), a 485-hectare forested area to the northwest of Copenhagen, situated in Furesø and Gladsaxe municipalities
