= Gemini Residence =

Coordinates: 55°39′39″N 12°34′07″E

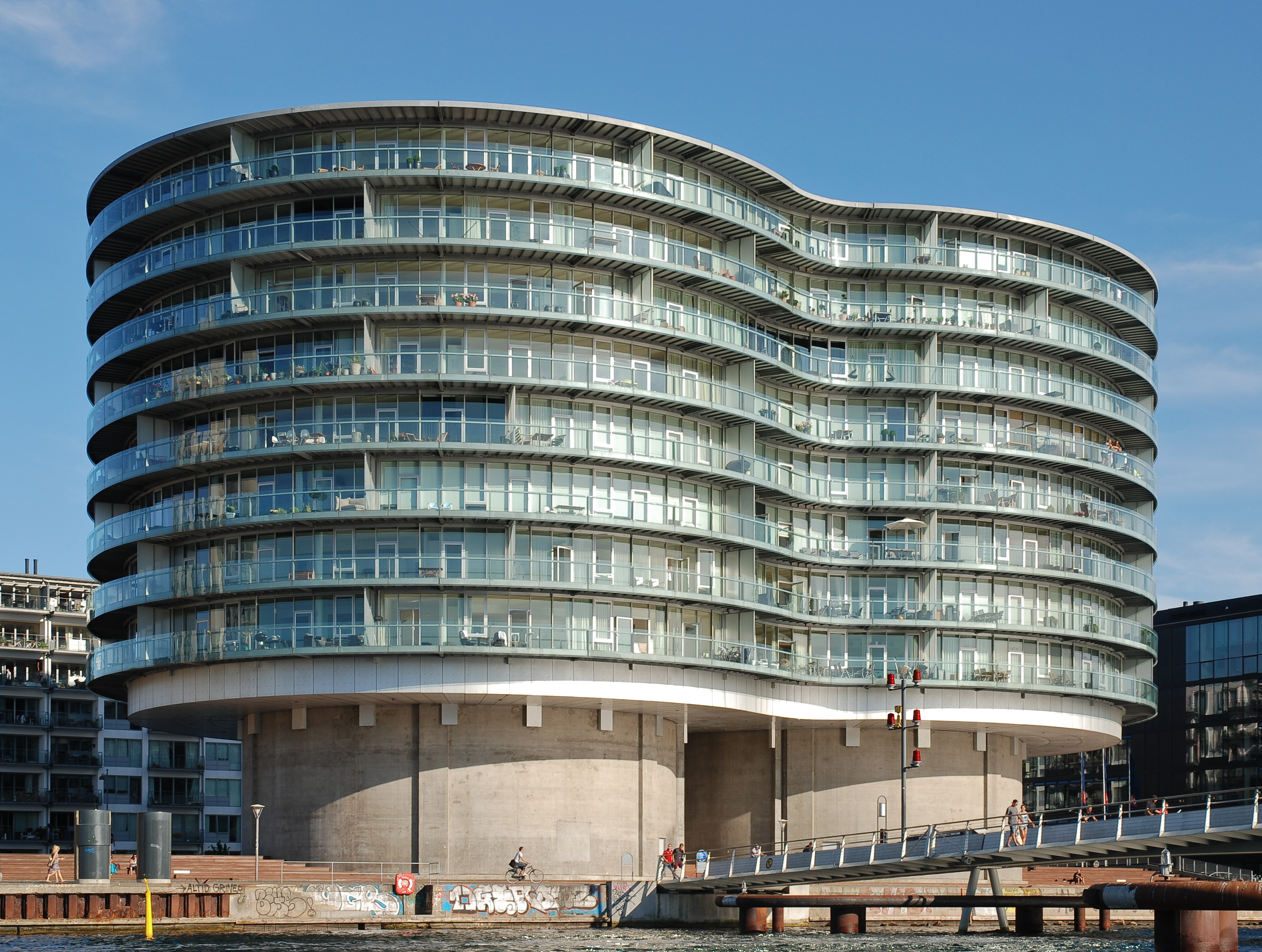
- Gemini Residence
- Interactive map of the Gemini Residence area
- Former names: Frøsiloen

General information
- Type: residential
- Architectural style: Modern
- Location: Islands Brygge
- Construction started: 2002
- Completed: 2005

Height
- Height: 42 m

Dimensions
- Diameter: 25 m

Technical details
- Structural system: Reinforced concrete
- Floor count: 8
- Floor area: 39,000 square metres (420,000 sq ft)

Design and construction
- Architect: MVRDV
- Main contractor: JJW Arkitekter

Gemini Residence is a residential building on the Islands Brygge waterfront in Copenhagen, Denmark. Built to the design of MVRDV, the building has been created by converting two former seed silos. It is located at the end of Bryggebroen, connecting Amager-side Islands Brygge to Zealand-side Vesterbro across the harbour, and close to the southern end of Havneparken.

With a reference to the twin silos that have given the building its shape, Gemini Residence takes its name from the Astrological sign Gemini, the Latin name of the Zodiac sign The Twins.

== History ==
Dansk Soyakagefabrik (English: Danish Soybean Cake Factory) was a soybean processing plant establishing in the Islands Brygge area in 1909. It produced oil and animal feed and grew to the largest employer in the area, in the 1950s employing 1,200 mainly local workers. The two silos now converted into Gemini Residence were built in 1963. After the plant closed in the 1990s, the area was redeveloped to a new district with both residential and office buildings. The conversion of the two seed silos was carried out from 2002–05.

== Building ==
The converted twin silos were raw concrete cylinders, standing 42 metres tall and 25 metres wide. The hollow cores of the silos are used for the infrastructure of the building, stairs, elevators and hallways. The two silos are connected on each floor, giving the building a basic layout resembling the infinity symbol, ∞. The two rotundas are capped with a Texlon roof for natural light, creating a lobby area as tall as the building itself, within which residents and visitors can move up and down.

The apartments have been clipped to the exterior of the silos. The apartments have floor to ceiling windows and balconies along their entire length. At the foot of the silos, the raw concrete has been left uncovered to highlight the origin and history of the structure. This creates a marked horizontal overhang above the quayside esplanade passing below, while the narrow chasm it leaves at ground level creates a passage between dockside and streetside. Also referenced just as 'Frøsilo'

== Gallery ==
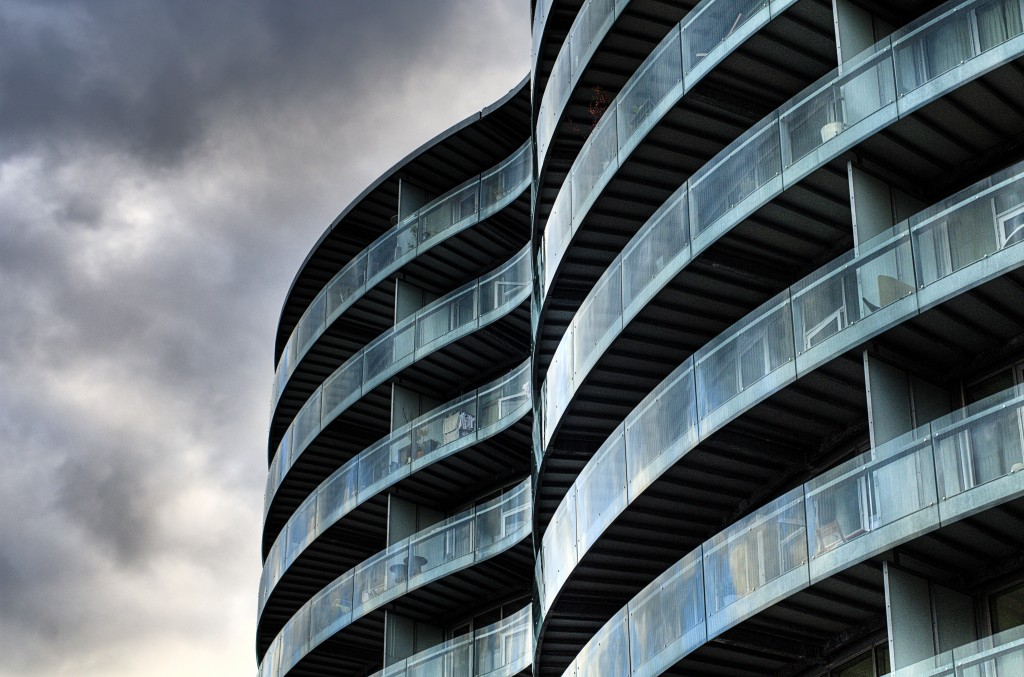

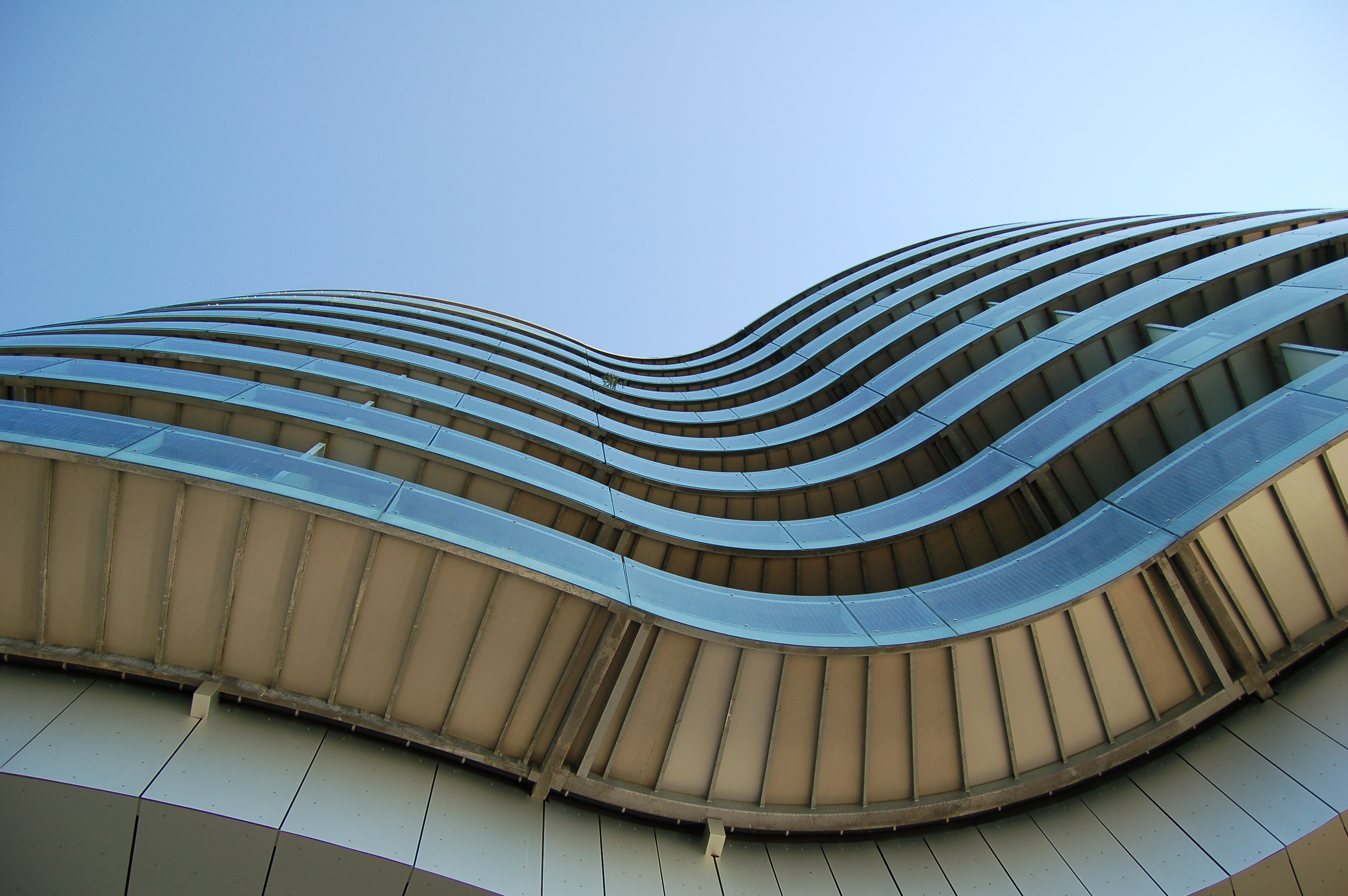

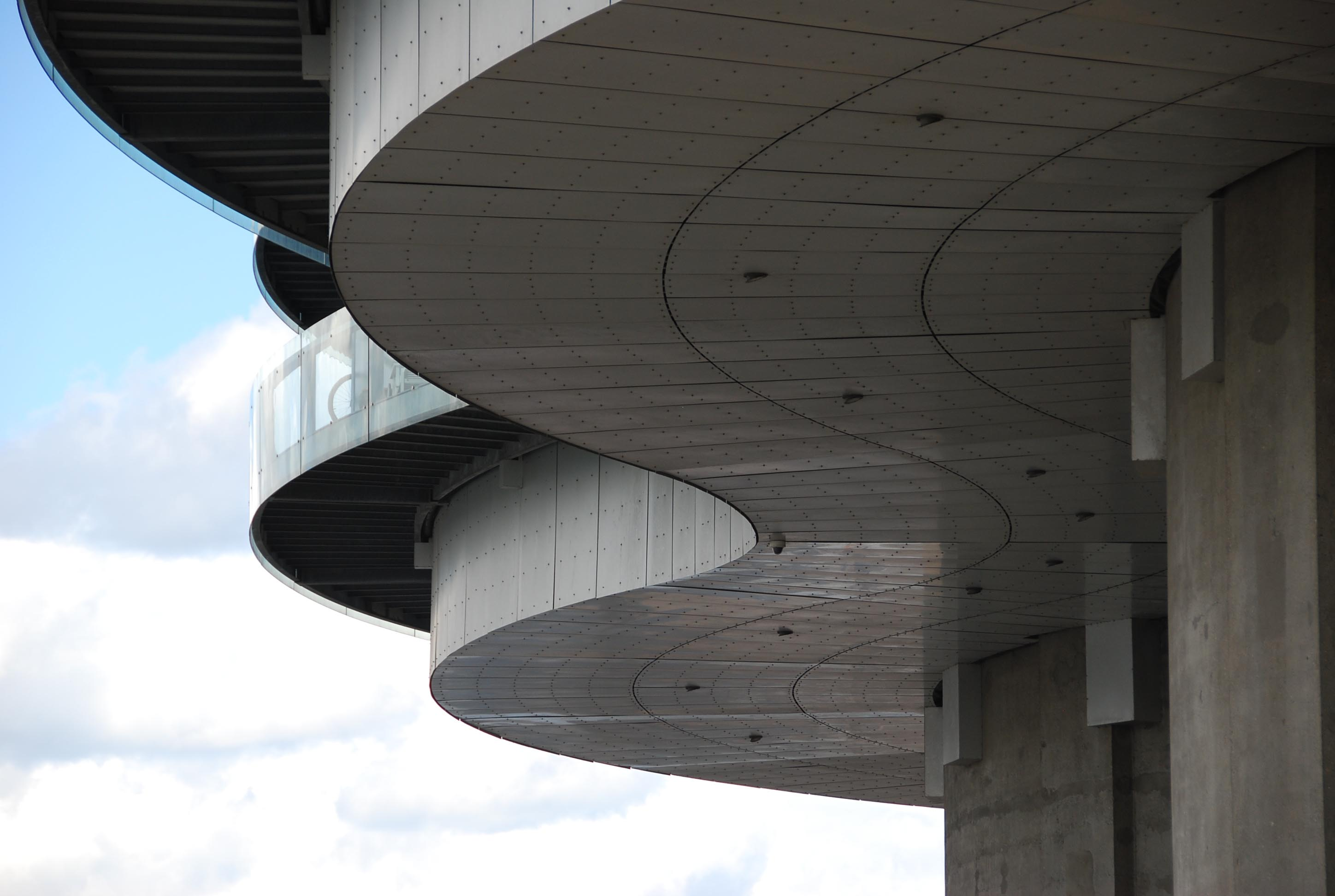

== Literature ==
- Munk Beilin, Sarah; Dahl, Ellen; Brams, Rikke. Guide to New Architecture in Copenhagen. Copenhagen: Danish Architecture Center. p. 112. ISBN 978-87-90668-71-6.
