= Killing of Christian Zedig =

2026 crime in Copenhagen, Denmark

- Part of 2026 FIFA World Cup controversies
- Christian Zedig
- Location: Islands Brygge, Copenhagen, Denmark
- Date: 30 June 2026 c. 20:45 (CET)
- Attack type: Beating
- Victim: Christian Zedig
- Perpetrator: Nkumba Ludovic Tshiembe
- Convictions: Simple assault
- Sentence: 1 year imprisonment

Christian Zedig was a 32-year-old Swedish police officer who died after being punched during a public screening of a 2026 FIFA World Cup match in Copenhagen, Denmark. On 30 June 2026, at a large-screen event on Islands Brygge showing the match between Norway and Ivory Coast, a disturbance occurred involving groups of spectators. Zedig, who was off duty and attending with friends, was struck once with a fist to the left side of the head or neck by Nkumba Ludovic Tshiembe. The blow ruptured an artery and caused severe internal bleeding. Zedig was taken to hospital and died three days later, on 3 July 2026.

== Incident ==
The assault took place at approximately 20:45 on 30 June 2026 during the World Cup fan event organised by the Norwegian company Fotballfesten. According to the indictment and video evidence presented in court, Tshiembe first climbed onto a bench and threw two beer cans at a group that included Zedig. Immediately afterwards he delivered a hard punch with a clenched fist to Zedig's left head or neck area. Zedig briefly remained standing, then collapsed. Police found him with life-threatening injuries. The rupture of an artery leading to the brain produced extensive bleeding. Prosecutors stated that Zedig had not started or sought any conflict and had attempted to intervene in a disturbance. Tshiembe later said in court that he did not know why he had hit Zedig and that he felt “terrible” about what had happened. He has a background in boxing.

== Investigation and arrest ==
Danish police launched a search for the suspect after the incident was captured on video. Nkumba Ludovic Tshiembe, a Congolose citizen, then 31, surrendered to Copenhagen police on the morning of 3 July 2026, the same day Zedig died. He was remanded in custody and initially denied the charges. Two other men were also investigated in connection with the events; one was suspected of having stepped on Zedig while he lay on the ground, but those cases were handled separately.

== Trial and sentencing ==
Tshiembe was charged under section 244 of the Danish Penal Code with simple assault. Danish law focuses on the act and the presence or absence of intent to kill rather than the fatal outcome alone. The maximum sentence for this offence is one year in prison. The trial took place on 7 October 2026 in Copenhagen City Court. Tshiembe admitted guilt at the start of the hearing. Special prosecutor Søren Harbo played video of the incident. The court heard that Tshiembe had previous convictions, including a seven-year sentence in 2017 for attempted murder after stabbing a man in the heart at a nightclub, a conviction for rape, and other violent offences. He had also received an additional three-month sentence for a prison fight while serving the earlier term. The court sentenced Tshiembe to one year in prison, the maximum for the charged offence, and imposed a one-year ban on entering nightlife venues that serve strong alcohol between midnight and 05:00. Aggravating factors cited included his aggressive behaviour, prior serious violent convictions, and the fatal consequence of the punch. The civil claim for damages of approximately 1.9 million Danish kroner brought by Zedig's family was deferred to a separate civil process. Tshiembe stated he would not appeal the criminal sentence.

== Aftermath ==
The case received extensive coverage in Swedish and Danish media. Zedig's widow, Emelie, told the court and later media that the loss had permanently changed the family's life and that the grief affected their daily existence. Zedig's father, Johan Zedig, publicly asked for a meeting with Danish prime minister Mette Frederiksen to discuss the length of the sentence. Danish politicians, including the justice minister, criticised the sentencing framework for lethal violence in cases without proven intent to kill, and the case contributed to public debate about possible changes to the law. The killing prompted expressions of condolence from Swedish prime minister Ulf Kristersson and from Zedig's colleagues in the Höglandet police district, where a memorial gathering was held. Copenhagen's mayor for children and youth, Jakob Næsager, called for public World Cup screenings at Islands Brygge to be cancelled following the attack.
