= Nokken =

Nokken may refer to:

- Nikie (folklore), a water spirit in Germanic mythology
- Nokken, Copenhagen, a place in Denmark
- Frida Nokken (born 1948), Norwegian civil servant

== See also ==
- Wilhelm Theodor Nocken, German painter
