= Svanemølle Beach =

Beach in Copenhagen, Denmark

Coordinates: 55.7201°N 12.5838°E

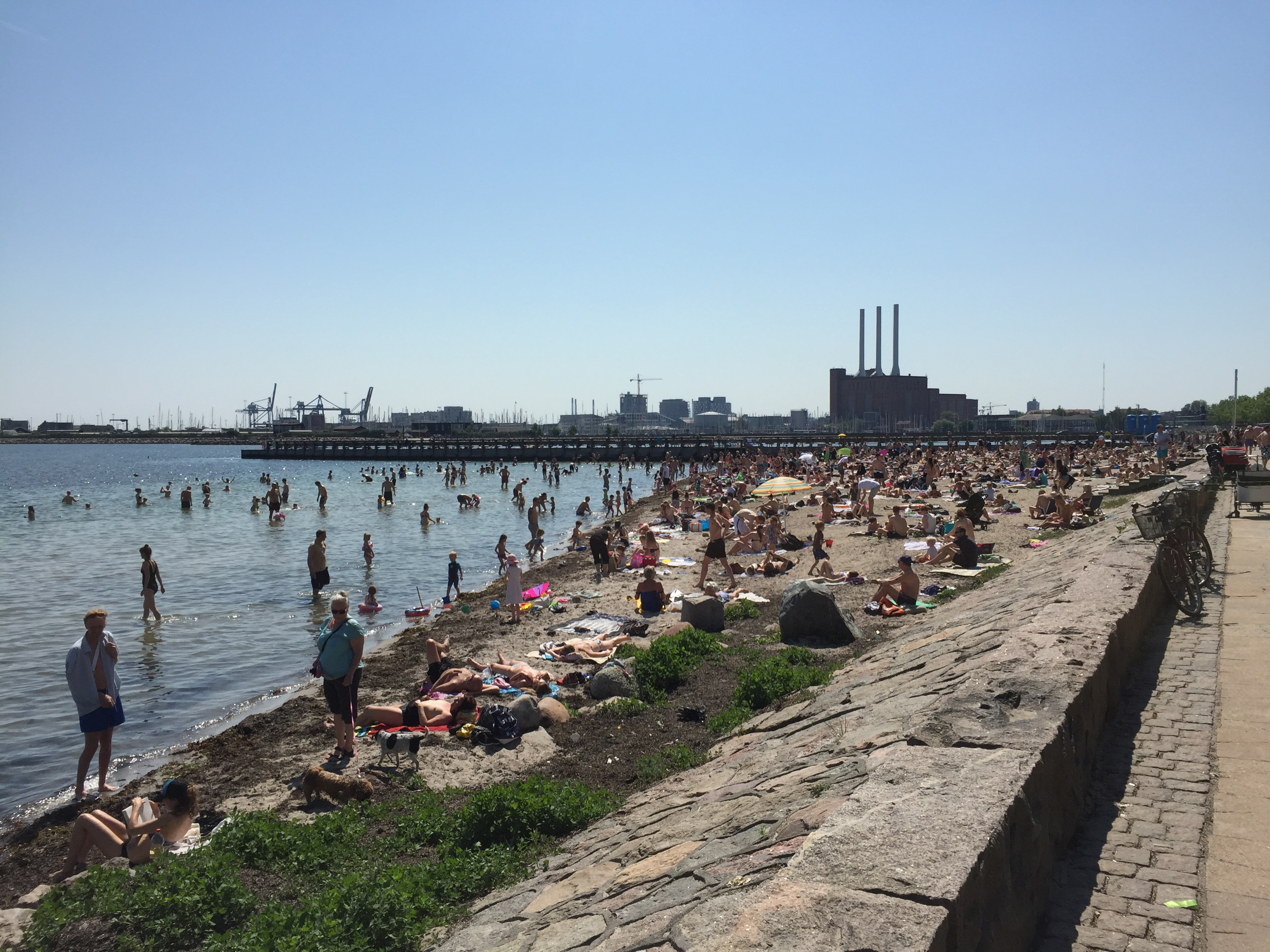
Svanemølle Strand on a typical sunny day in Copenhagen.

Svanemølle Beach (Danish: Svanemøllestranden) is an urban beach situated in the Østerbro district of Copenhagen, Denmark. It is situated in the bottom of the Svanemølle Bay, off Strandpromenaden, a promenade that follows the coast between Copenhagen's Nordhavn area to the south and Tuborg Havn in Hellerup to the north. Svanemøllen Marina and the Svanemølle Power Station are located just south of the beach.

== History ==
Svanemølle Beach was inaugurated 20 June 2010. Designed by the architectural firm White, Thing and Wainøe Landskab, and Ramboll, it provides 4,000 square metres of beach with family-friendly low waters as well as a 130 metre long pier providing direct access to deeper water.

== See also ==
- Copenhagen Harbour Baths
- Amager Strandpark
