= Havneparken =

Park in Copenhagen, Denmark

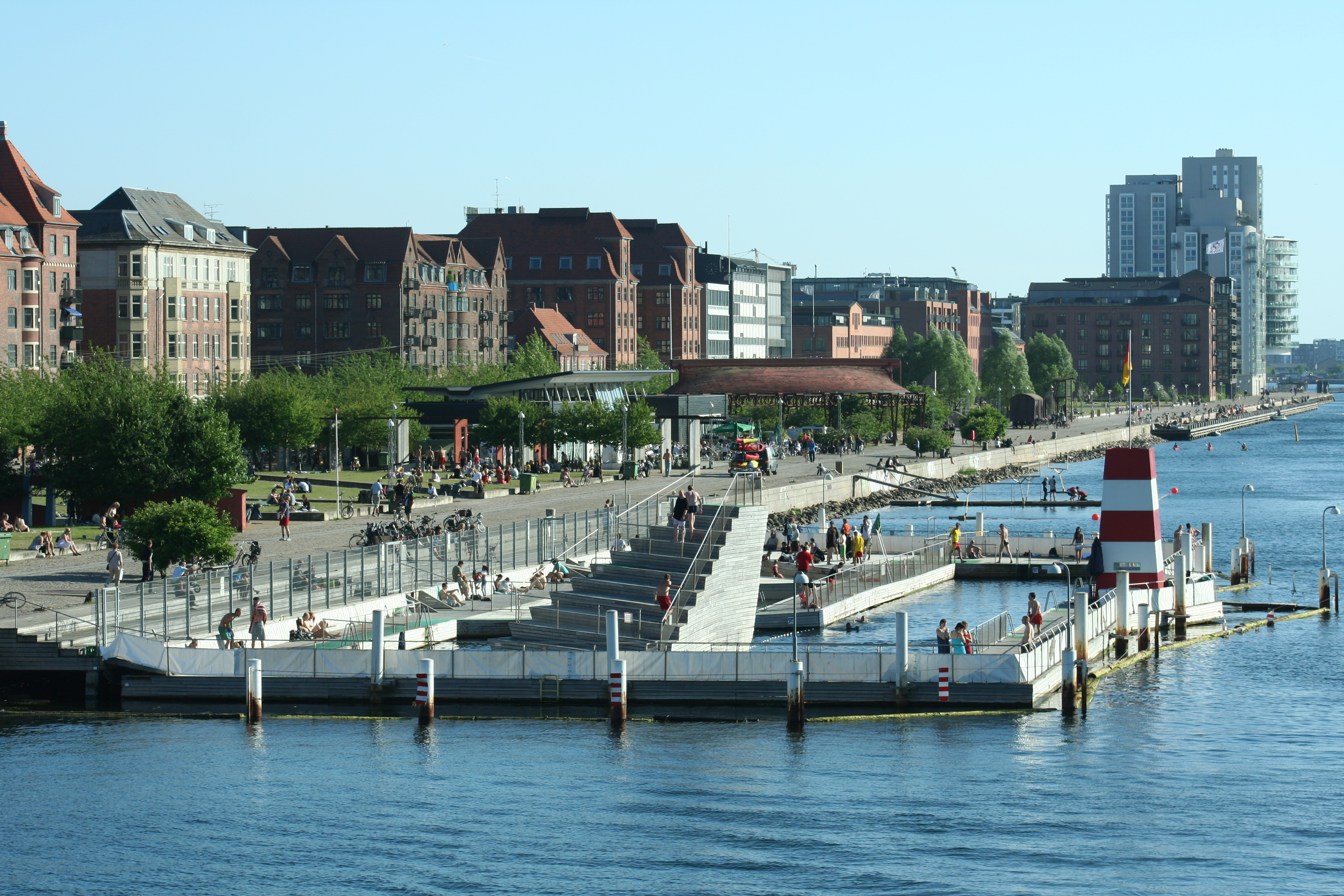
- The park seen from the water

- Location within Denmark
- Type: Public
- Location: Islands Brygge, Copenhagen, Denmark
- Coordinates: 55.6663°N 12.5754°E
- Area: 3,8 hectares
- Created: 1984

Havneparken (English: The Harbour Park) is a public park located directly on the waterfront in the district of Islands Brygge in central Copenhagen, Denmark. It is one of the most lively and popular places along the Copenhagen harbourfront. Located in a former dockland area, the park has retained a number of features from the area's industrial past, including disused railway tracks and an abandoned railway car used as an exhibition space, while am old ship hull turned upside-down serves as an idiosyncratic bandstand and pavilion. The park is also the location of the Islands Brygge Cultural Centre and the Islands Brygge Harbour Bath.

== History ==
The first plans to transform the area into a park was conceived by local grassroots in 1978. In 1983-84, an area of 1 hectare, located just south of Langebro, was put at the disposal of Islands Brygge Local Council. In 1995, the park was extended with an additional 2,8 hectares of waterfront, located to the south of the original area. In 2002 a temporary harbour bath was constructed and the following year, it was replaced by a larger and permanent harbour bath.

== Features ==
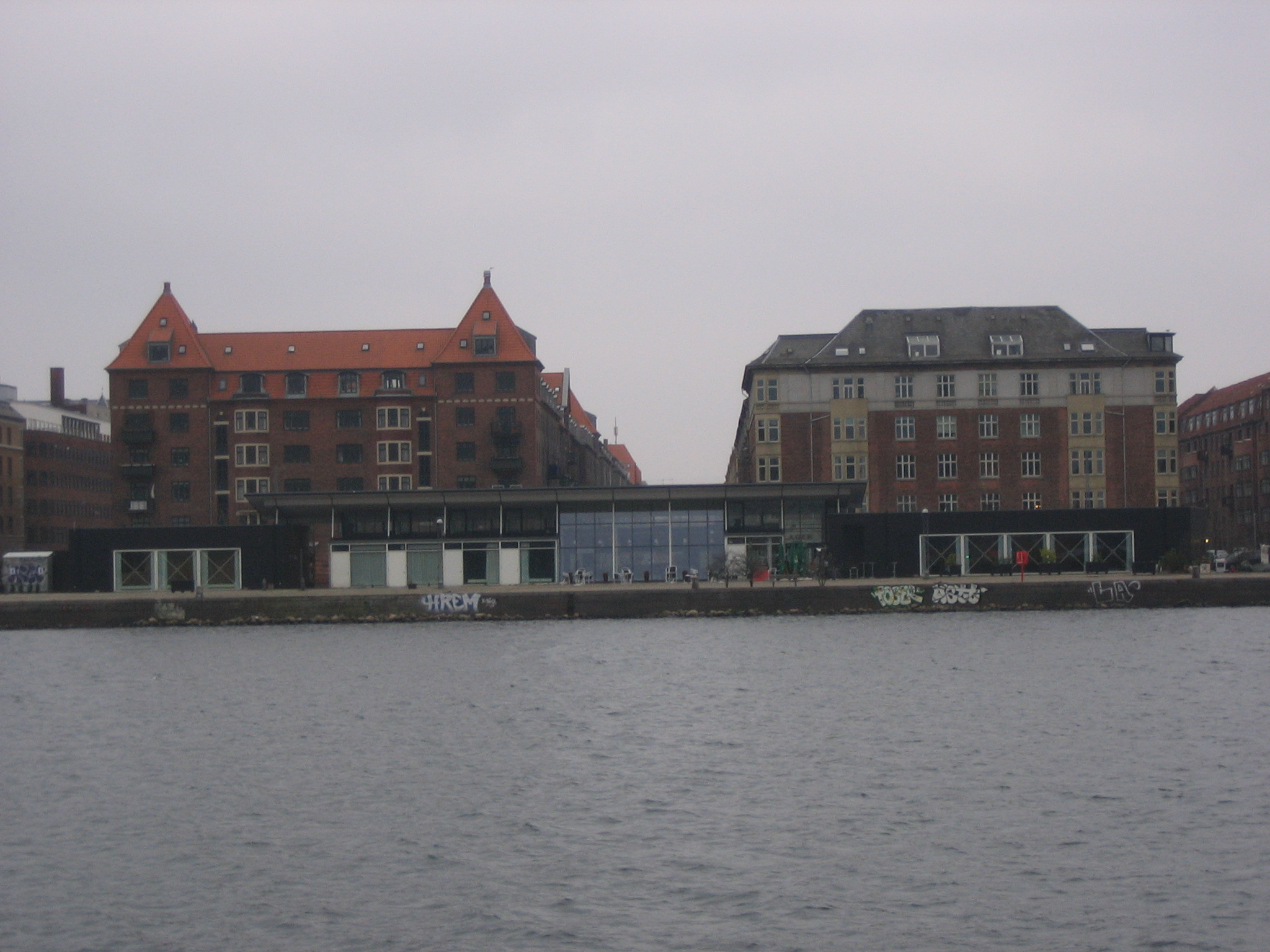
Islands Brygge Cultural Centre

=== Islands Brygge Cultural Centre ===
Islands Brygge Cultural Centre (Danish: Islandsbrygge Kulturhus) is a community arts centre, located in the middle of the Harbour Park. It was built in 2000 as a replacement for an earlier cultural centre that was demolished as part of the redevelopment of the northernmost part of the Islands Brygge neighbourhood. The centre has a restaurant and arranges a multitude of cultural activities.

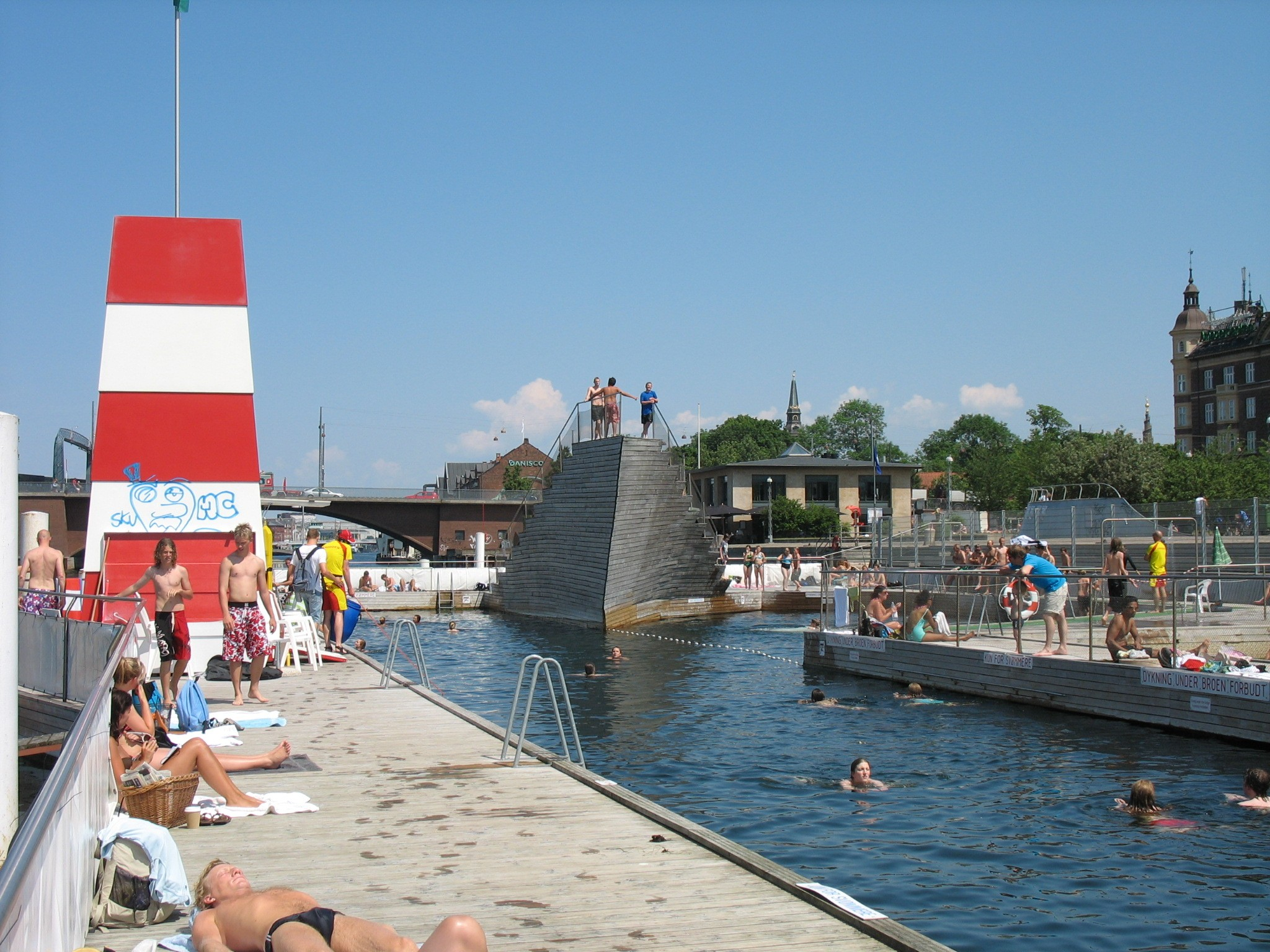
The Harbour Bath

=== Islands Brygge Harbour Bath ===
Islandsbrygge Harbour Bath is a public swimming facility, located in the water off the northern part of the park. Built to the design of architects Julien de Smedt and Bjarke Ingels in 2003, it has a total of 5 pools and a capacity of 600 people. There are two pools dedicated to children, two 50 metre pools for swimming and a diving pool with three and five metre springboards.

=== "Pinen" bandstand ===
Pinen is a bandstand, constructed by resting a hull turned upside-down on two columns. The ship is a former Limfjord ferry, "Pinen", built in 1954. It operated between the island Mors and the Salling Peninsula until 1978, when the Sallingsund Bridge was constructed. Pinen was torn down 2011 after 15 years of neglected repair.

=== Preserved industrial structures ===
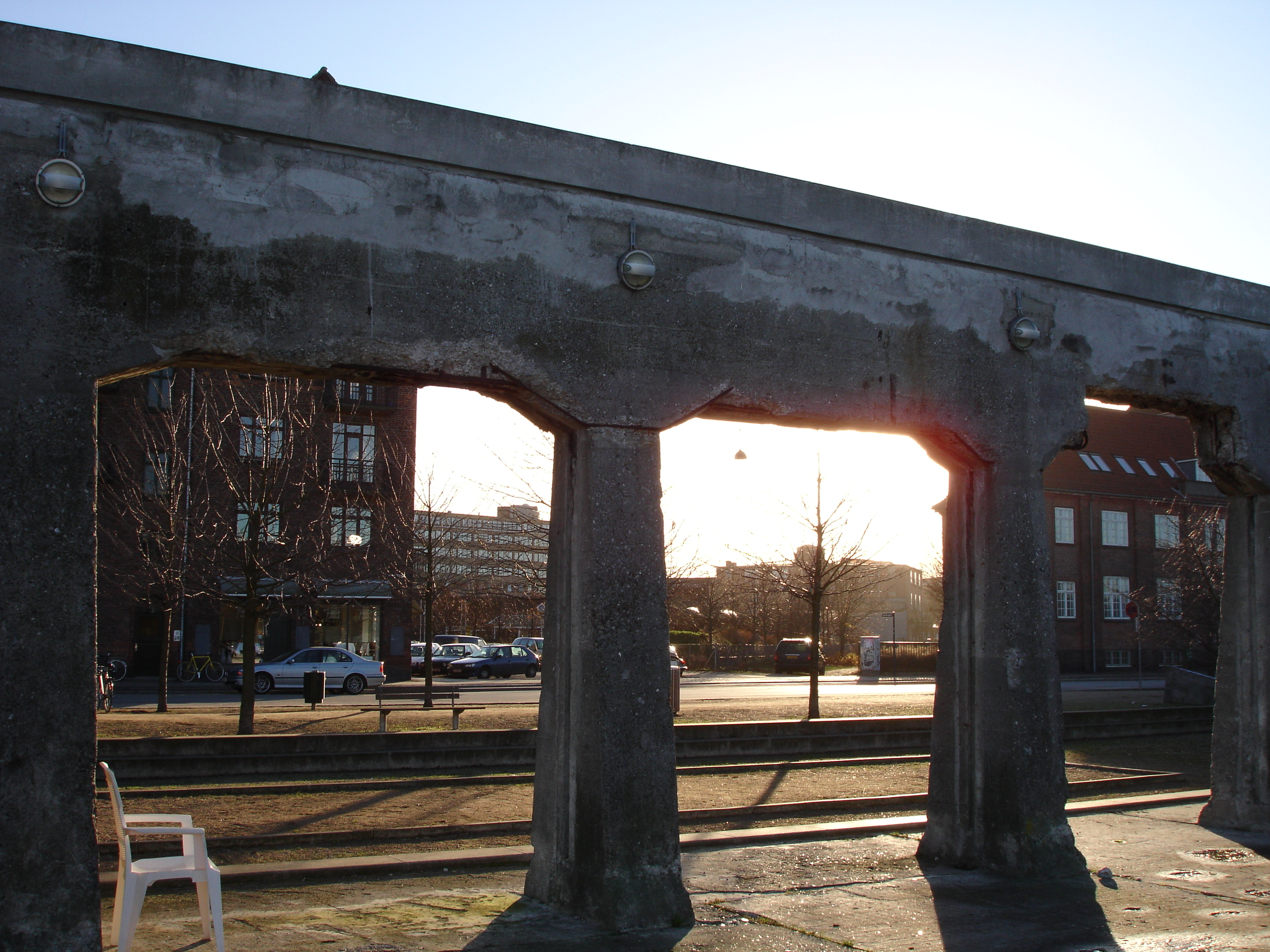
Industrial structure at Havneparken

In the redevelopment of the area. a number of existing industrial structures was preserved and incorporated into the design of the park. This was done to commemorate the history of the site and to create a sense of place. The quayside still features the disused railway tracks and an old railway car contains an exhibition on the local history of the neighbourhood, rusty steel profiles have been left and now serves as pergolas, upon which Honeysuckle and Clematis are trained and bits of wall from now demolished buildings have been left.

== Activities ==
Havneparken is one of the most popular places in Copenhagen to enjoy good weather and the quayside serves as an esplanade popular with strollers.

Apart from swimming at the harbour bath, the park also contains facilities for a number of other sports. These include facilities for skateboarding and streetbasket (at Vestmanna Plads) as well as beach volleyball and pétanque (at Halfdans Plads). The park also has a playground.

The park is also home to many open-air concerts, either performed at the bandstand or a variety of other locations.

== See also ==
- Parks and open spaces in Copenhagen
