= GoBoat =

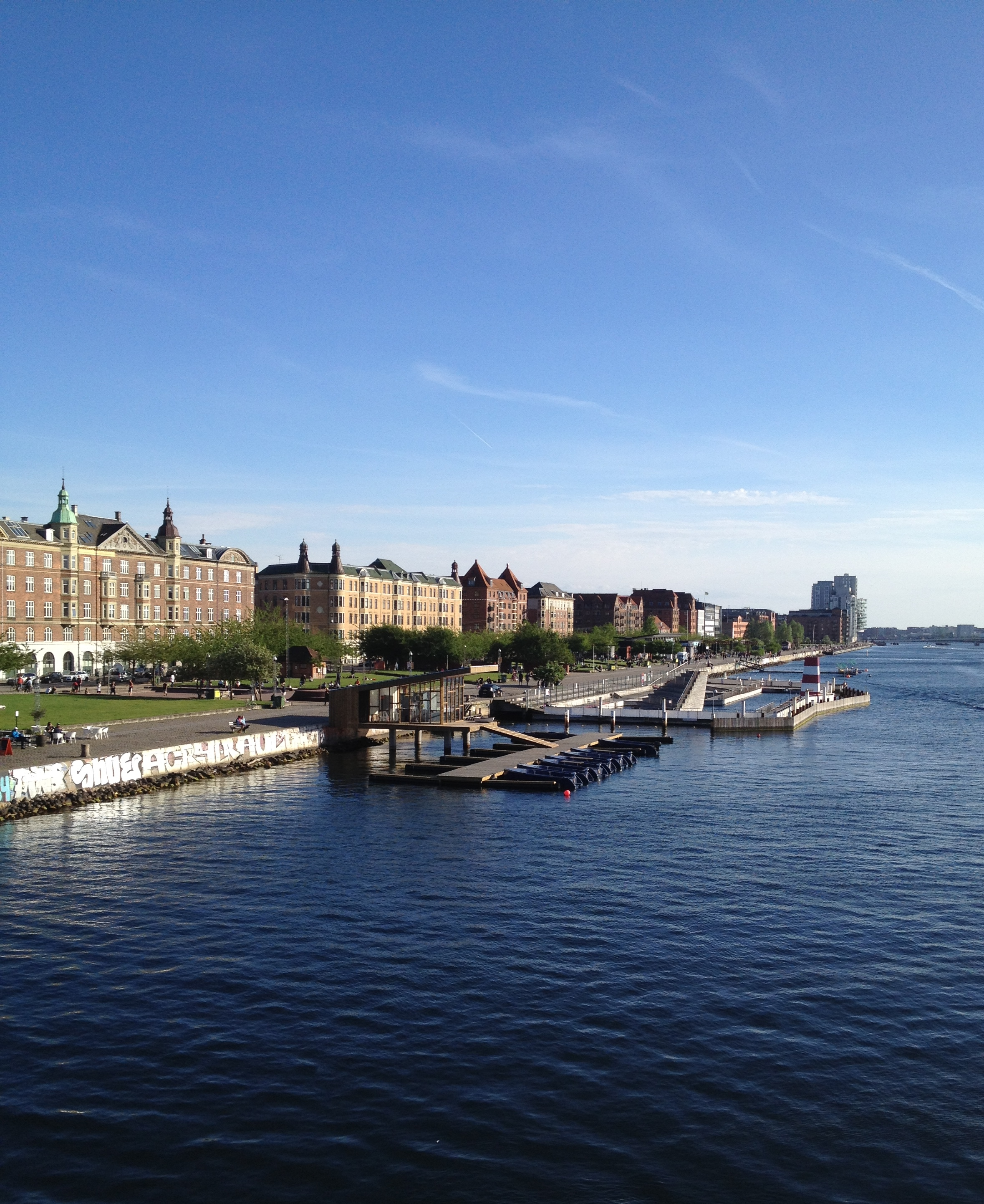
The GoBoat terminal at Islands Brygge as seen from Lange Bridge

Goboat is a Danish developer and operator of solar energy-powered, picnic boats. The company opened its first terminal at Islands Brygge in Copenhagen in 2014.

== Design ==
The company is founded by Carl Kai Rand, architect and Boatdesigner, Kasper Højer Romme and Anders Mørk. The concept is centred on eco-friendly principles. The boats are built out of recycled plastic from cola bottles and a later version will be built out of decommissioned windmills. Norwegian wood company Kebony has delivered sustainable wood for the Goboat terminal, the floating pier and the boats themselves. The solar-powered rental terminal is developed by Gaia Solar.

== Concept ==
The boats fits up to eight people around a picnic table and their navigation requires no previous experience with sailing. A boat can sail up to 12 hours on one charge. It is also possible to buy picnic baskets at the terminal.
