= Copenhagen Harbour Baths =

Public bath in Copenhagen, Denmark

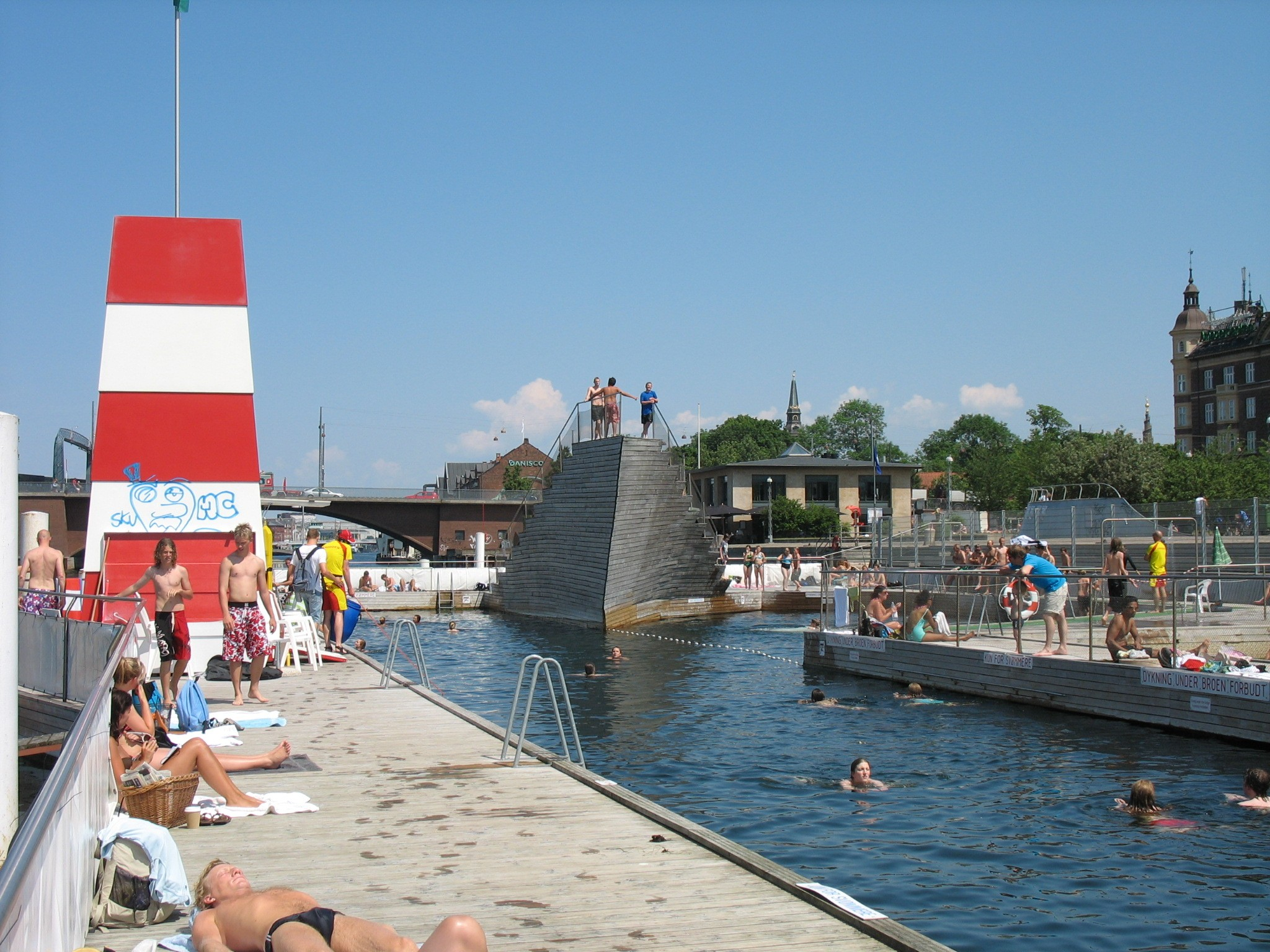
The Harbour Bath at Islands Brygge

The Copenhagen Harbour Baths (Danish: Københavns Havnebade) are a system of recreational bathing facilities along the waterfront of Copenhagen, Denmark. There are currently four harbour baths, the first and best-known of which is located at Islands Brygge.

The harbour baths serve as a supplement to the beaches around the city, such as the extensive urban beach at Amager Strandpark. In 2010 the Royal Danish Theatre also established the temporary artificial Ophelia Beach on the Kvæsthusbroen pier next to the Royal Playhouse.

== History ==
For the swimming season of 2002, the harbour bath at Islands Brygge opened as the first harbour bath in town. In 2003, the harbour bath was towed to the other side of the harbour and set up at Fisketorvet, while Islands Brygge got a new larger and permanent harbour bath designed by PLOT.

In 2010, the third harbour bath opened at the Svanemølle Bay after several delays and changes to the design.

== Water quality ==
The water in the harbour today is as clean as that of Øresund. The harbour baths are a result of a consistent effort to improve the water quality in Copenhagen Harbour to an extent that allows for bathing to take place. The harbour baths are generally open all days of the week in the bathing season. In the event of unusually strong rains, sewage water may spill into the harbour and cause pollution with E. coli bacteria, closing the harbour baths temporarily. Such a closure normally lasts for a couple of days until tidal flux has changed all the water. Water quality is being monitored and reported on a dedicated web site

== Individual venues ==
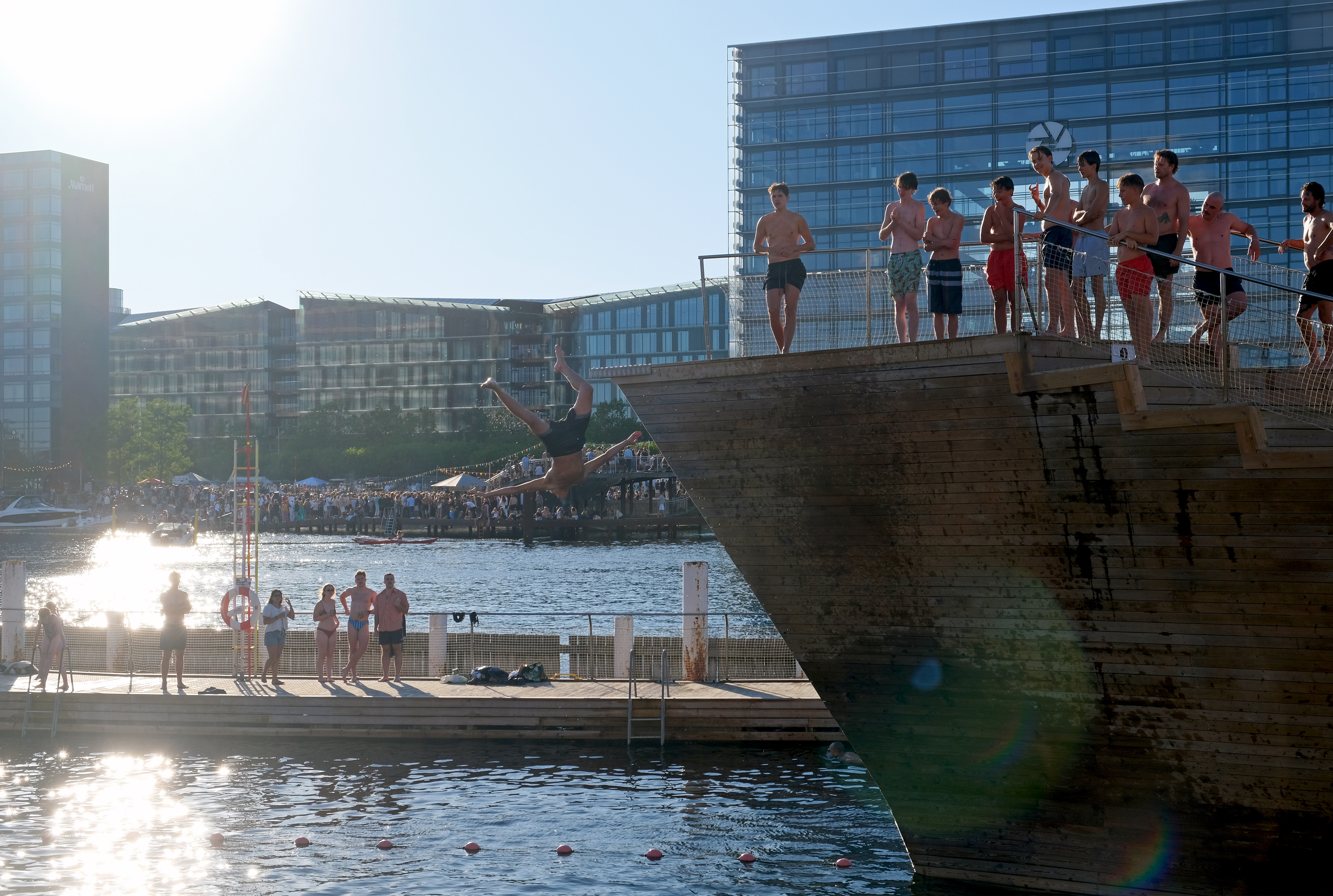
Diver at Islands Brygge Harbour Bath

=== Islands Brygge ===
The harbour bath at Islands Brygge (55.6686°N 12.5776°E) has a total of 5 pools and a capacity for 600 people. It is 7 meters deep. There are two pools dedicated to children, two 50-metre pools for swimming and a diving pool with three and five metre springboards. The project was completed in 2003 by JDS Architects and Bjarke Ingels Group.

=== Copencabana ===
Copencabana (the name being a portmanteau of Copacabana and Copenhagen), or Harbour Bath Fisketorvet, lies next to the Fisketorvet Shopping Centre and Havneholmen in Vesterbro (55.6627°N 12.5640°E). It is a 650-square-meter complex with three pools and springboards of 1 metre, 2 metres and 3 metres.

=== Svanemølle Beach ===
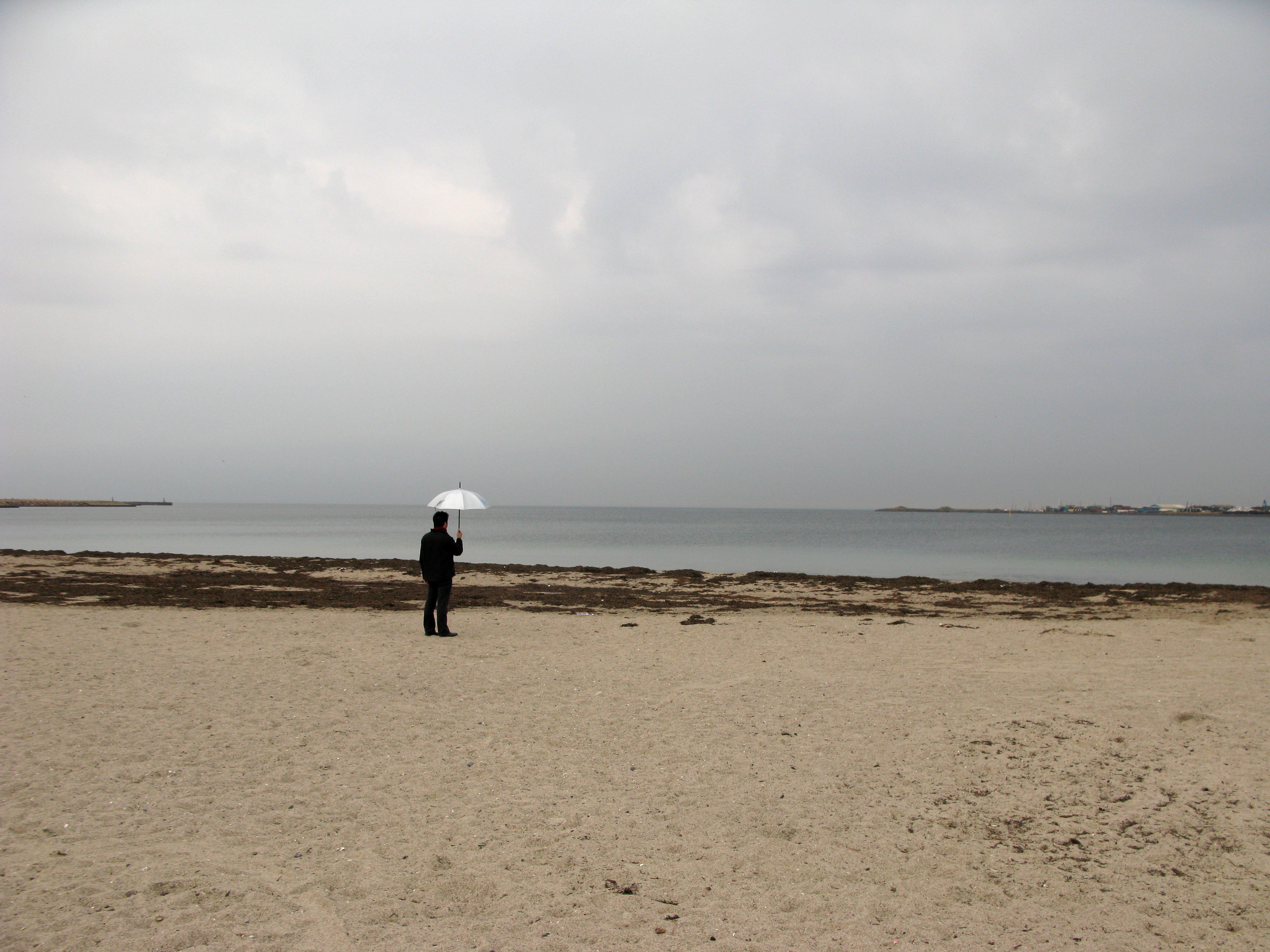
Svanemølle Strand on a gloomy day.

Svanemølle Beach is located in Svanemølle Bay in Østerbro (55.7201°N 12.5838°E) and was inaugurated on 20 June 2010. It provides 4,000 square metres of beach with family-friendly low waters, as well as a 130-metre-long pier providing direct access to deeper waters.

=== Sluseholmen ===
The newest venue, at Sluseholmen in South Harbour (55.6465°N 12.5537°E), was inaugurated on 16 December 2011.

== See also ==
- Round Christiansborg Open Water Swim
- Islands Brygge
- Goboat

== Literature ==
- Munk Beilin, Sarah; Dahl, Ellen; Brams, Rikke. Guide to New Architecture in Copenhagen. Copenhagen: Danish Architecture Center. p. 96. ISBN 978-87-90668-71-6.
