= Nokken, Copenhagen =

Coordinates: 55°39′06″N 12°33′46″E

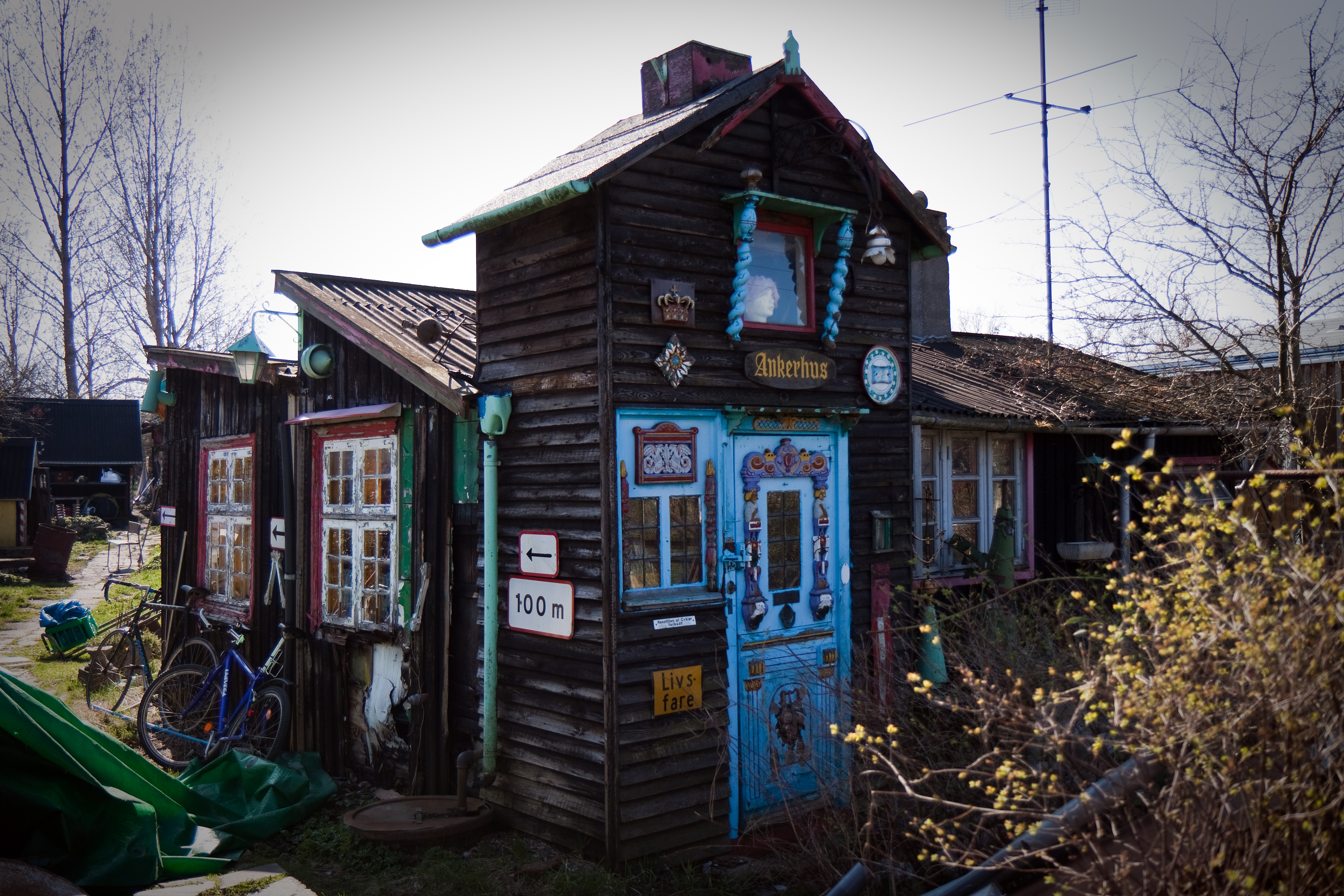
A house at Nokken

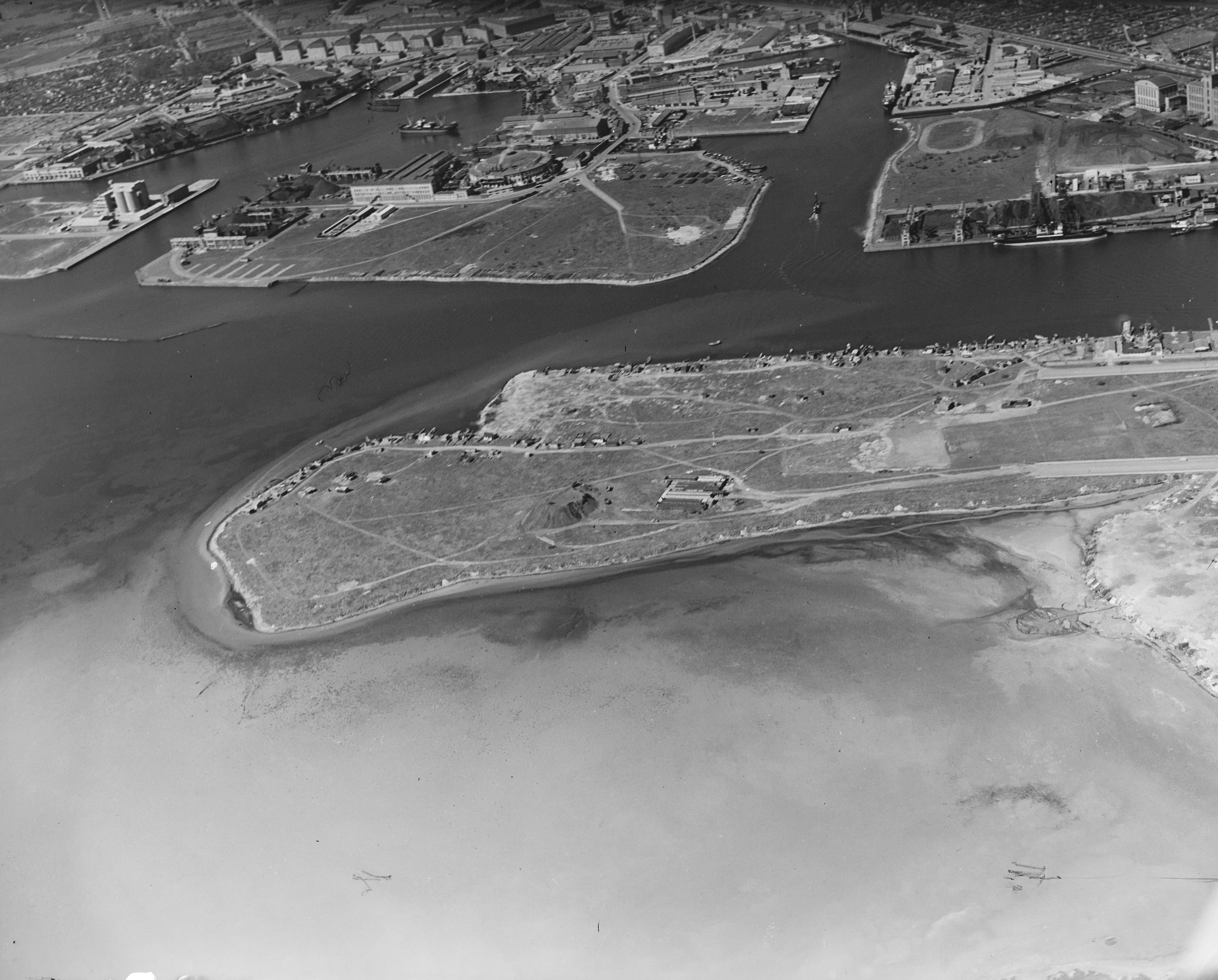
Aerial photography from 1953

Nokken is a self-built community located on the north-west coast of Amager, just south of Islands Brygge, in Copenhagen, Denmark.

== History ==
Islands Brygge was created on reclaimed land in the years between 1900 and 1905. The southern part of the area was owned by the Port Authority and used for port-related industry. Nokken was founded in the 1930s when permission was given to use an undeveloped area for fishing. The first sheds and cabins were constructed, and over the years the community continued to grow.

Ownership of the area was ceded to Copenhagen Municipality when heavy industry disappeared from Islands Brygge towards the end of the century. When plans were being drafted for the redevelopment of the former industrial areas at Islands Brygge, Nokken's residents feared that it would threaten the existence of their community. Negotiations with the municipal authorities finally gave Nokken status as an allotment (kolonihaveforening). The area is currently regulated by some 100 individual leases.

== See also ==
- Freetown Christiania
