= Islands Brygge =

District of Copenhagen

Coordinates: 55°40′N 12°35′E

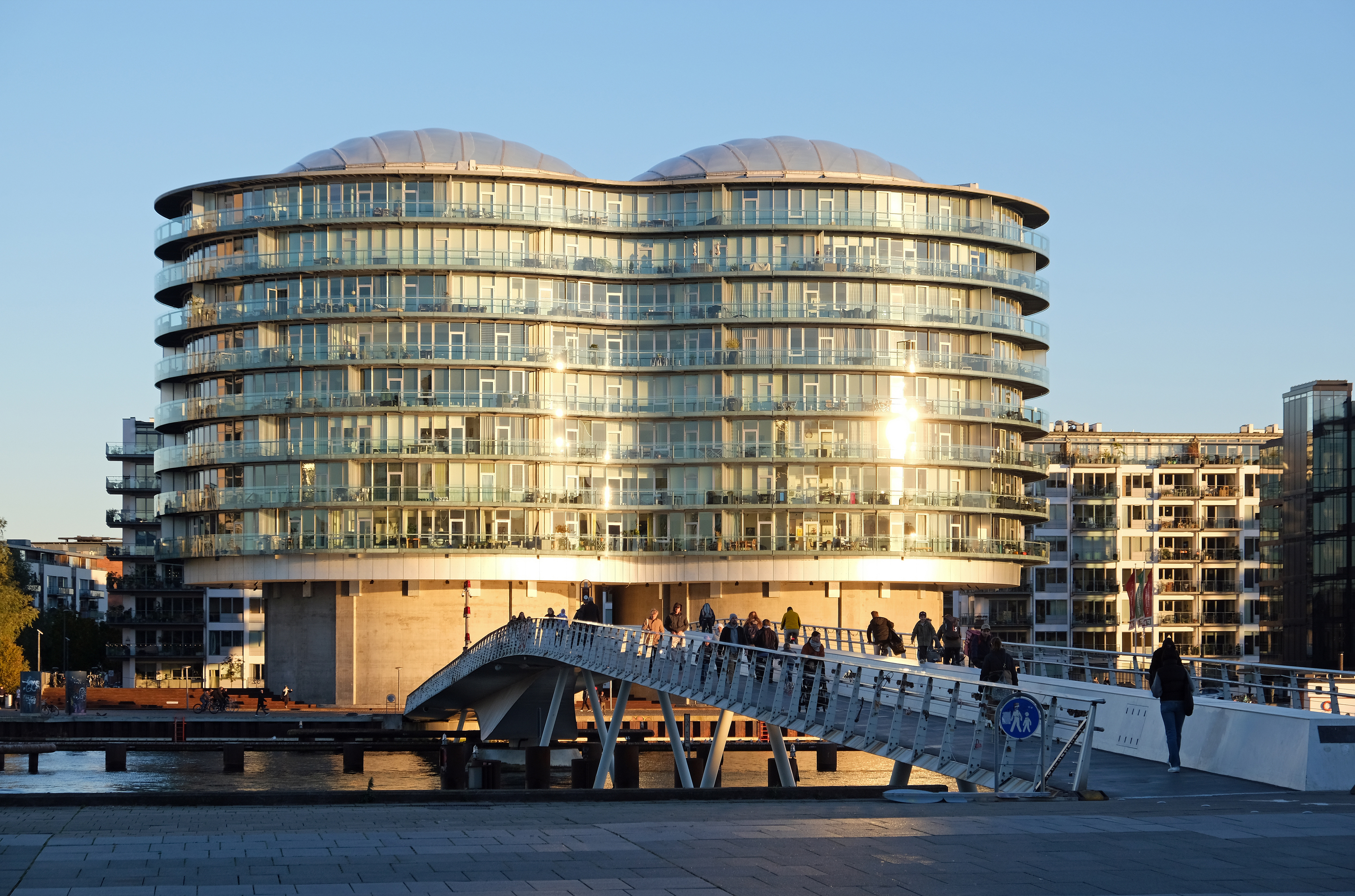
Gemini Residence, two former silos converted into an apartment building by MVRDV

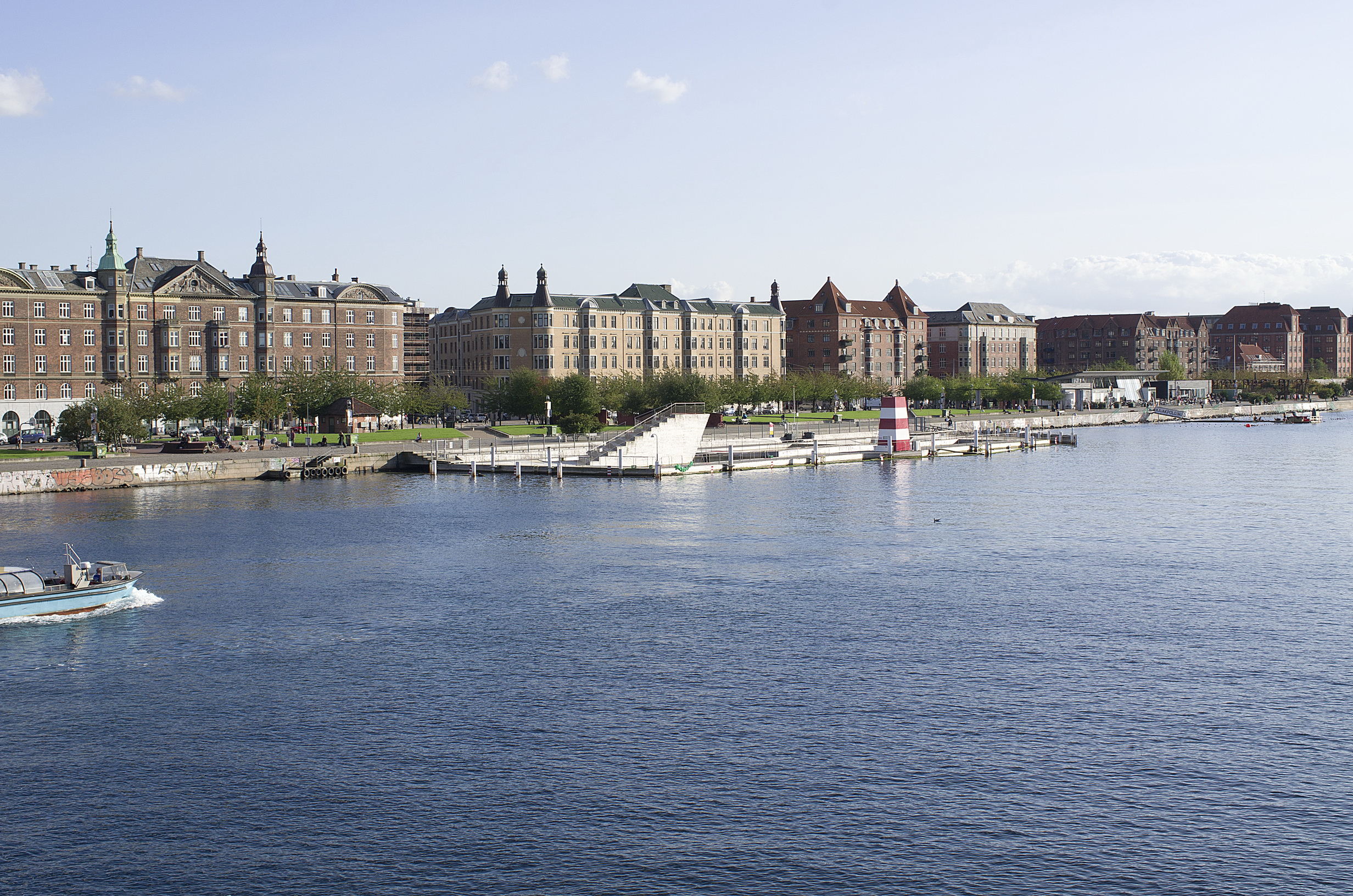
Islands Brygge waterfront

Islands Brygge (English: Iceland's Quay) is a harbourfront area in central Copenhagen, Denmark, located on the north-western coast of Amager. The neighbourhood is noted for its waterfront park Havneparken, which is one of the most popular areas along the Copenhagen harbourfront and the location of one of the Copenhagen Harbour Baths.

Islands Brygge has an area of roughly 1 km² and a population of 12,147 (2009). It can be thought of as bounded by the Stadsgraven moat to the north, Copenhagen Harbour to the west, the Nokken allotments to the south, Ørestad North to the north-east and Amager Common to the east. For some of its course, Artillerivej defines the eastern border, but towards the north Islands Brygge straddles the street; Islands Brygge Metro Station, the Serum Institute and Islandsbrygge School, all of which are normally considered Islands Brygge, are all located east of Artillerivej.

Havneparken (English: The Harbour Park), located directly on the waterfront, is the main recreational area of the neighbourhood and one of the most lively and popular places along the Copenhagen harbourfront. It has retained several features from the area's industrial past, including old railway tracks and an old railway car. The park is also the location of the Islands Brygge Cultural House and the Islands Brygge Harbour Bath.

== History ==
The north-western shore of Amager was originally characterized by a shallow watered beach. The northern part of this area was reclaimed already in the 1620s with the construction of Christianshavn and the fortification of Copenhagen, while the area which would later become Islands Brygge remained undeveloped until the 1880s. At that time the shoreline was situated just east of present-day Artillerivej. In the 1880s, Christian IV's Arsenal on Slotsholmen had become too small, and the military received permission to reclaim an area to the south-west of Slotsgraven for the purpose of new military facilities. The area was filled in 1887-88 and a new arsenal, shooting ranges and army barracks were constructed on the land.

Towards the end of the 19th century, the Port of Copenhagen had become very busy both with freight and passenger vessels and extensions were needed. In 1901, the Port Authorities extended the existing reclamation southwards to create new areas for the storage of coal, timber and other goods. From 1905 construction of residential buildings on the most inland parts of the new land began.

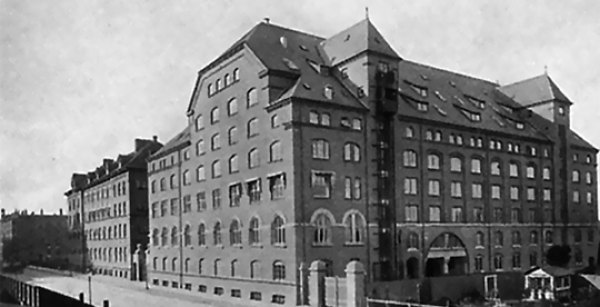
FDB's buildings on Njalsgade in about 1910

The co-operative Danish retailer FDB established new headquarters in the neighbourhood in 1908. It comprised both administrative functions, production and storage facilities.

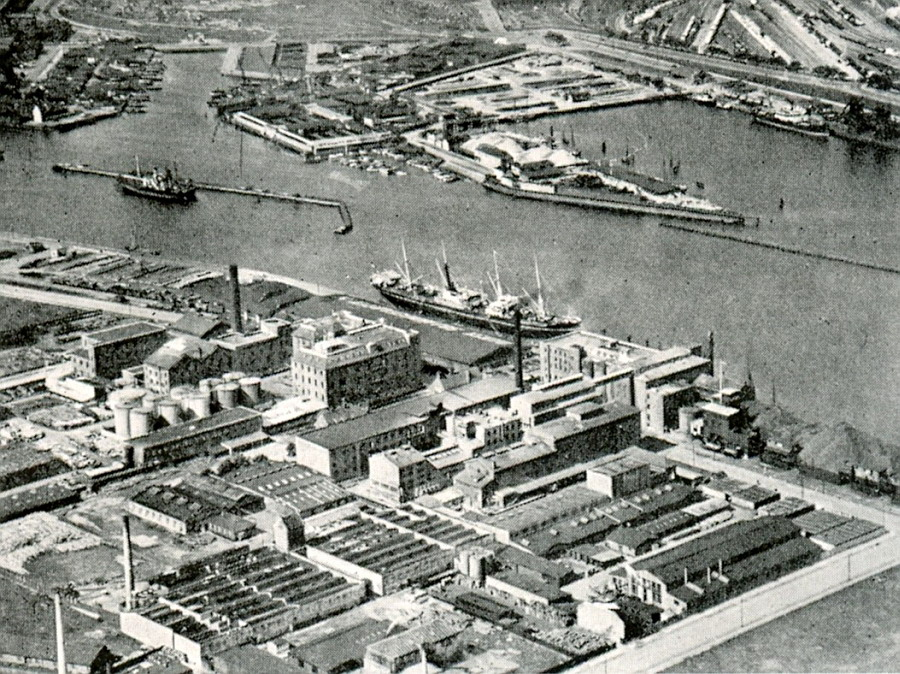
Dansk Sojakagefabrik in about 1930

Dansk Sojakagefabrik, a soy bean processing plant, was opened by the East Asiatic Company in 1909. At its peak in the 1950s, the plant employed approximately 2,500 workers, many of whom lived in the neighbourhood.

To improve road and rail connections between Zealand and Amager, a new bridge was constructed at the site of the present-day Langebro, replacing an older bridge leading to Christianshavn. The new bridge soon became outdated and in 1930 a new temporary bridge was built. Langebro was completed in 1954.

Still more land was reclaimed until 1933, when Islands Brygge reached its current extent.

Under the Occupation of Denmark during World War II, many German troops were stationed at Islands Brygge, and the area was the target of a number of sabotage acts by the Danish resistance movement.

== Famous people from Islands Brygge ==
- Natasja Saad
- Mikkel Kessler
- Linse Kessler

== Image gallery ==
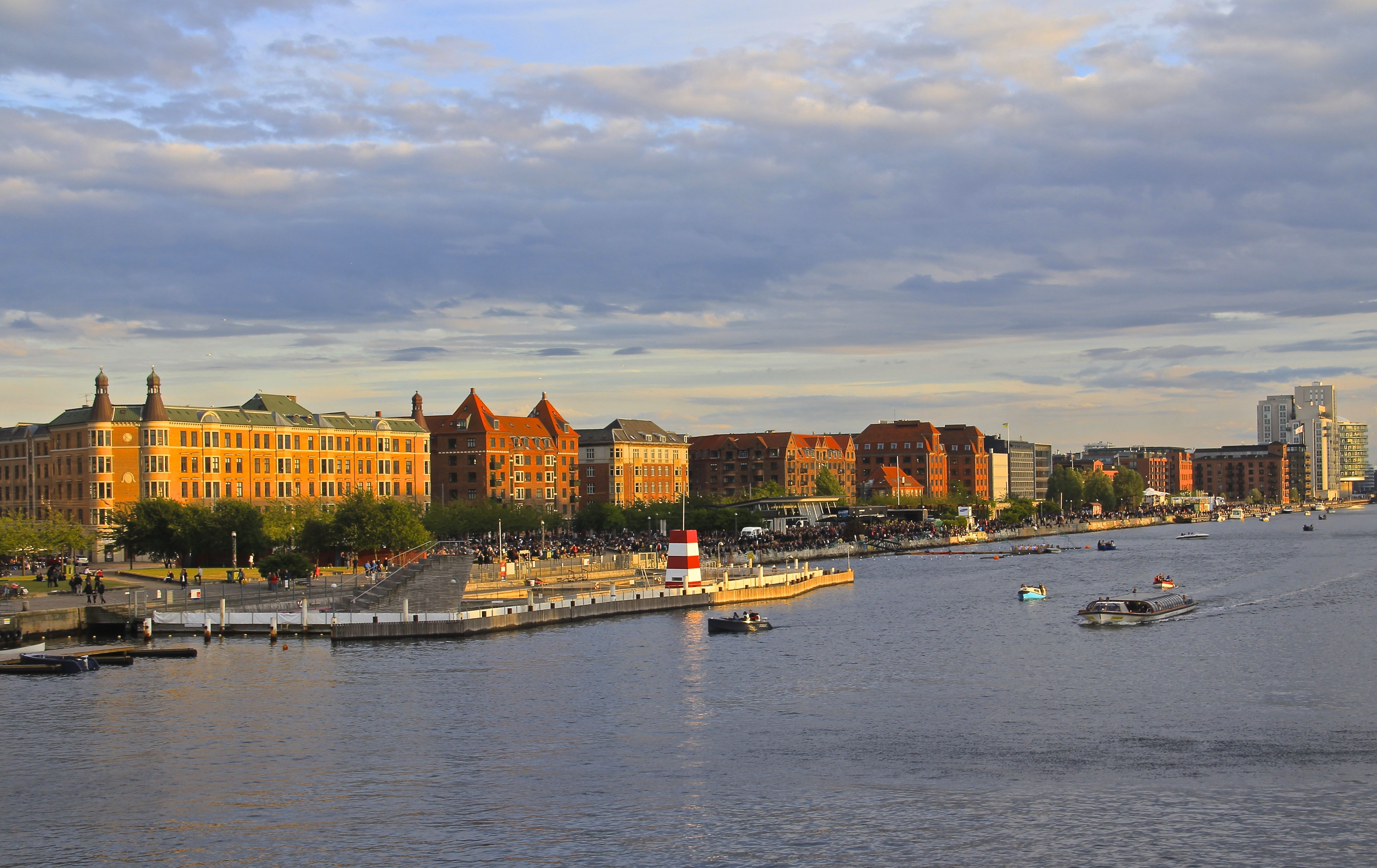
The Islands Brygge waterfront

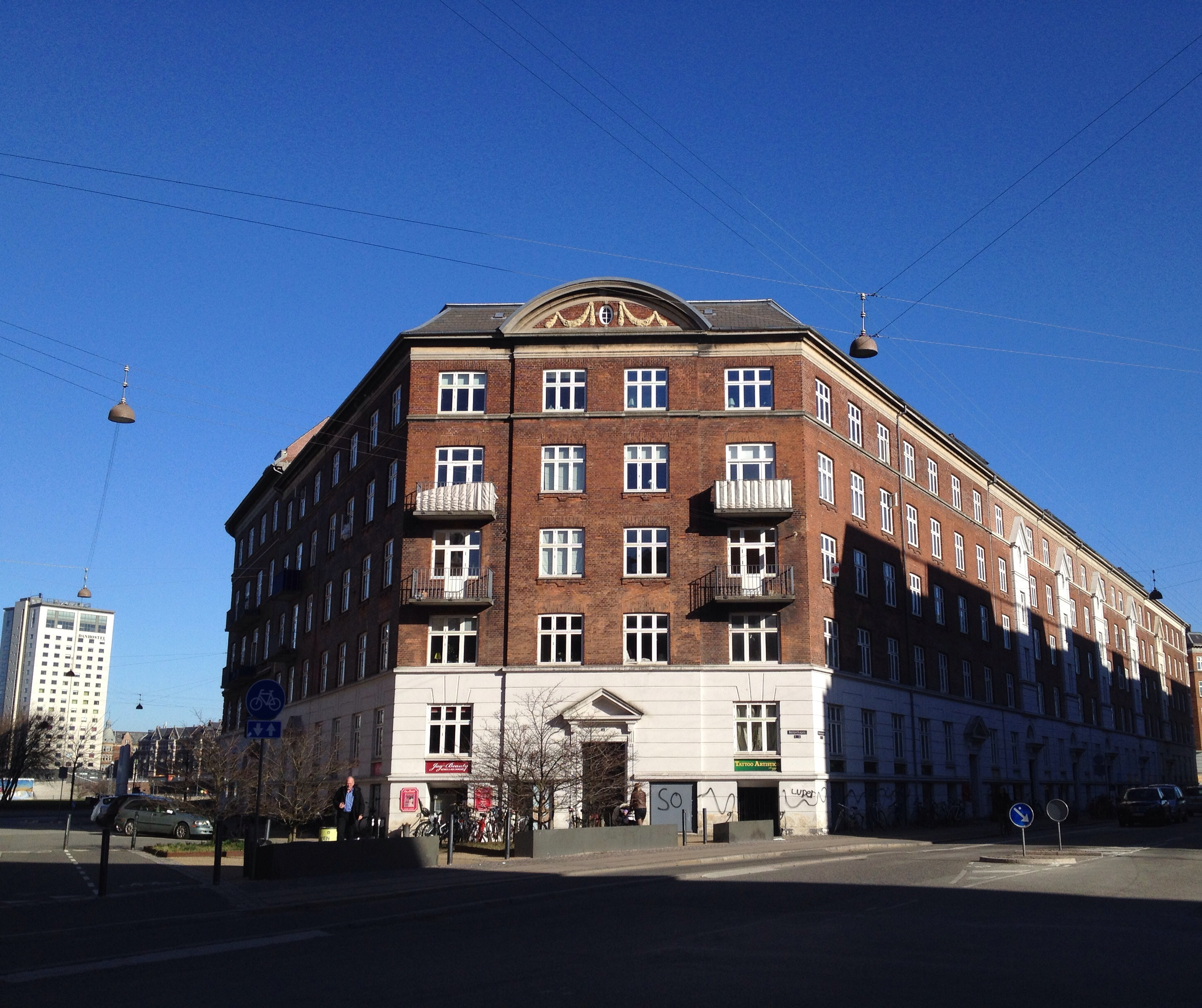
Building

== See also ==
- Goboat
