= Amager Common =

Nature reserve on Amager, Copenhagen, Denmark

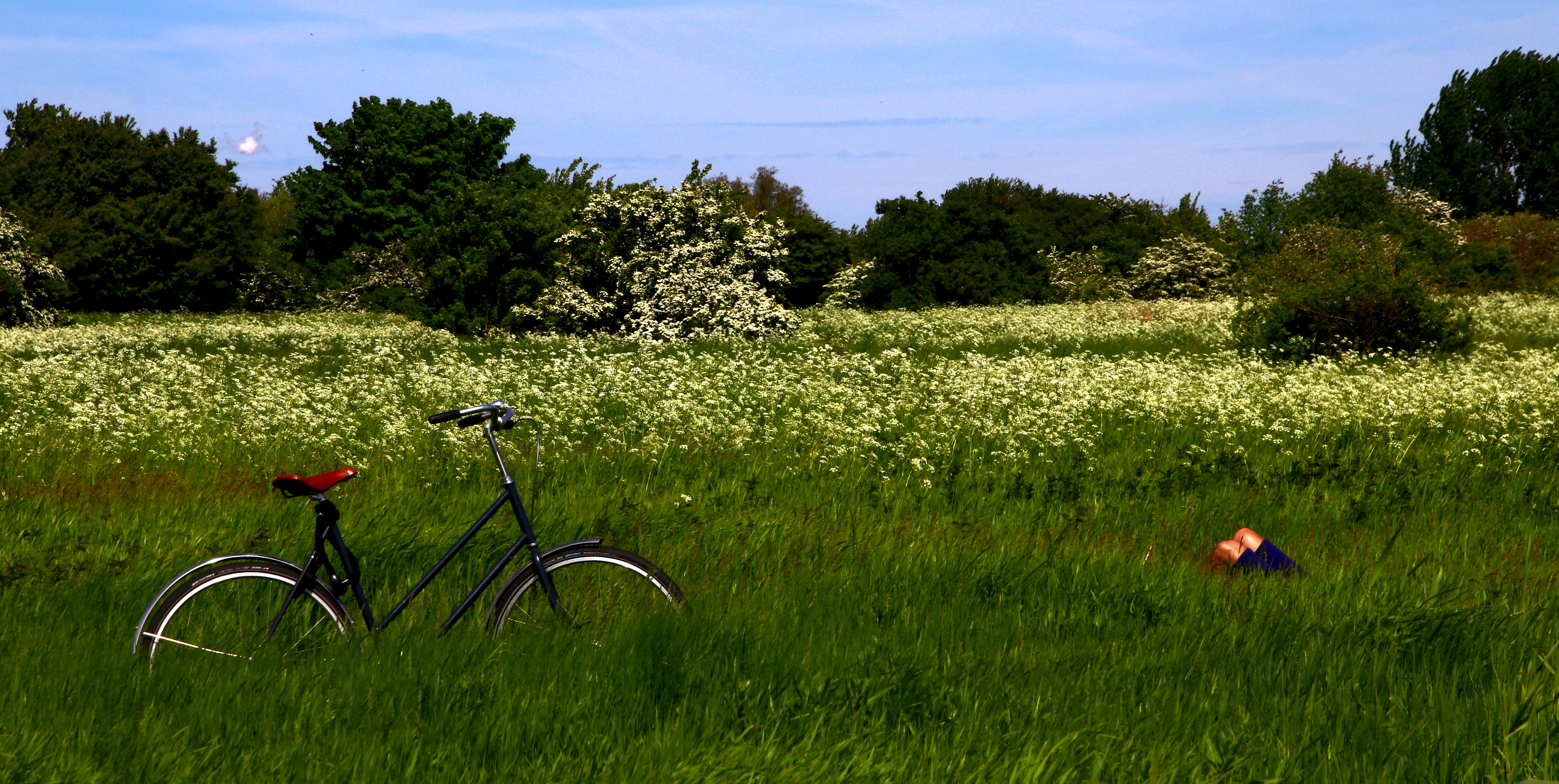
- Hanging out in Amager Common
- Interactive map of Amager Common
- Type: Urban park
- Location: Copenhagen, Denmark
- Coordinates: 55°39′0″N 12°34′30″E

Amager Common (Danish: Amager Fælled) is a 223 hectare nature reserve on Amager in Copenhagen. It contains meadows, lakes, forests and a range of wildlife such as Highland cattle.

== History ==
The area where Amager Common now lies is a former military area. Abandoned in 1964, Amager Common gained protected status in two rounds: Kalvebodkilefredningen in 1990 and Amager Fælled fredningen in 1994.

Amager Common contained one of Copenhagen's execution sites, with the final execution taking place on 22 April 1845.
