= Glostrup railway station =

Railway station in Greater Copenhagen, Denmark

Glostrup
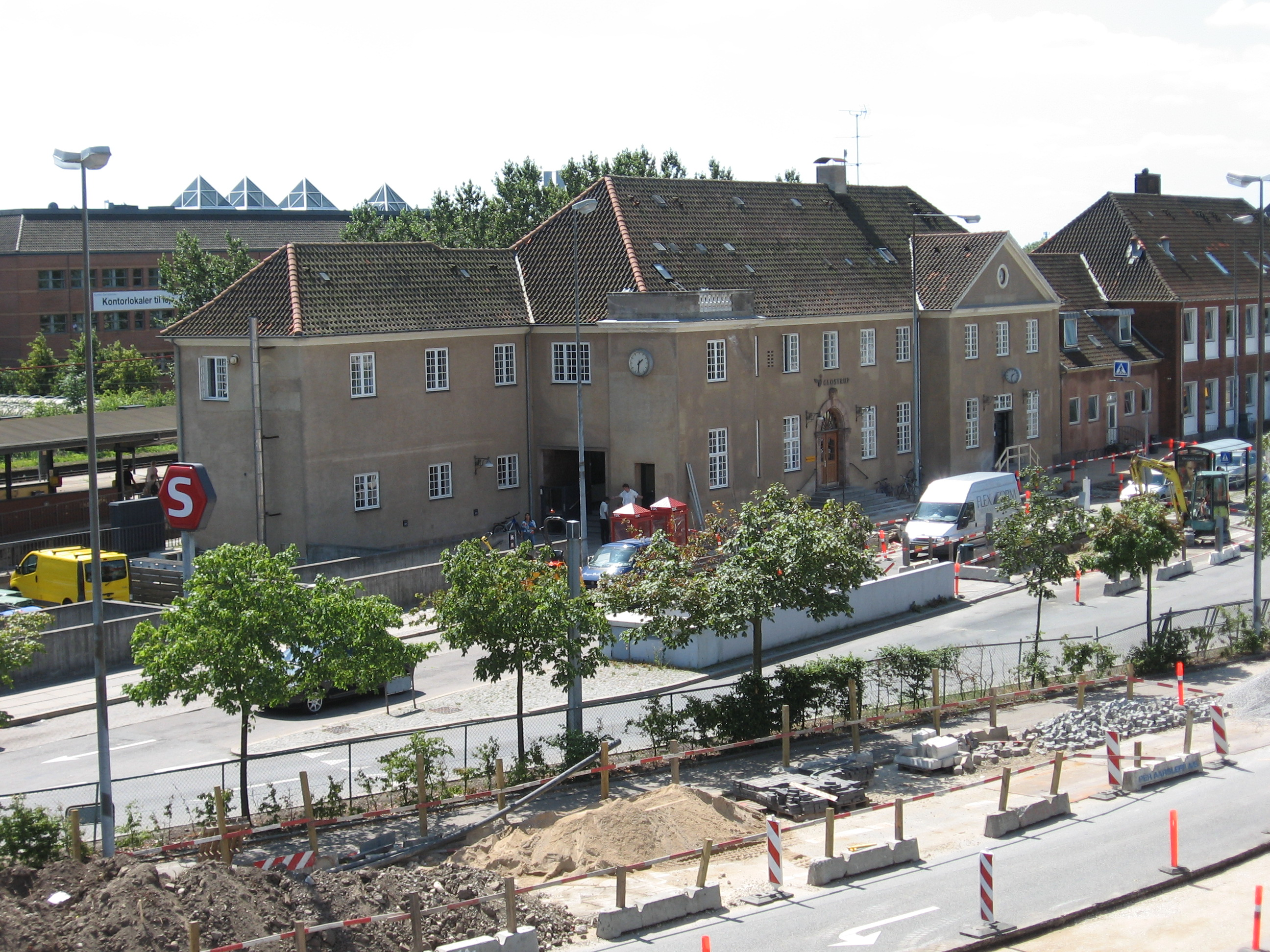
- The station building in 2006

General information
- Location: Banegårdspladsen 5; 2600 Glostrup; Glostrup Municipality; Denmark
- Coordinates: 55°39′46.5″N 12°23′50″E
- Elevation: 14.0 m (45.9 ft)
- Owner: DSB (station infrastructure); Banedanmark (rail infrastructure)
- Lines: West Line (Mainline); Høje Taastrup Line (S-train)
- Platforms: 1 island platform in use
- Train operators: DSB
- Connections: Bus terminal

Construction
- Cycle facilities: Bicycle parking station
- Accessible: Yes
- Architect: Heinrich Wenck (1918)

Other information
- Station code: Gl
- Website: Official website

History
- Opened: 26 June 1847 (Mainline); 17 June 1953 (S-train)
- Closed: 2008 (Mainline)
- Rebuilt: 1918
- Electrified: 1953 (S-train); 1988 (Mainline)

Services
Preceding station	S-train	Following station
Brøndbyøster towards Farum	B	Albertslund towards Høje Taastrup
Danshøj towards Buddinge	Bx Peak hours	Albertslund towards Høje Taastrup
Preceding station	Hovedstadens Letbane	Following station
Kirkebjerg towards Ishøj	Greater Copenhagen Light Rail	Glostrup Hospital - Rigshospitalet towards Rødovre Nord
Location

Glostrup station is a suburban rail and former main line railway station serving the railway town/suburb of Glostrup west of Copenhagen, Denmark. It is located close to the historical, administrative and commercial centre of Glostrup Municipality, but also serves Brøndbyvester in Brøndby Municipality, the boundary of which comes within a few hundred metres from the station. The station is connected to the nearby Glostrup Shopping Center via an underground walkway, the same walkway which is used to access the platforms.

Glostrup station is located on the Høje Taastrup radial of Copenhagen's S-train network, a hybrid commuter rail and rapid transit system serving Greater Copenhagen. It is served regularly by trains on the B-line which have a journey time to central Copenhagen of around 20 minutes. In front of the station is a major bus terminal from which local and express buses go in many directions.

The station opened in 1847 with the opening of the railway line from Copenhagen to Roskilde, and has been served by the S-train network since 1953. Its second and current station building was built in 1918 to designs by the Danish architect Heinrich Wenck (1851–1936).

Glostup station is one of the few remaining stations in Copenhagen that is an active rail freight destination. Sidings to industries west, south, and east of the station emerge from a small freight yard south of the long-distance tracks.

== History ==
Glostrup station opened on 26 June 1847 as one of the original intermediate stations on the new railway line from Copenhagen to Roskilde, the first railway line in the Kingdom of Denmark (Note: The first railway line in the then Danish Monarchy was the Kiel-Altona railway line in the Duchy of Holstein which had been completed three years earlier. However, the Duchy of Holstein was later lost to the Kingdom of Prussia after the Second Schleswig War in 1864, and that railway line is today part of the German rail network.). The centre of Glostrup was originally located by the church, but after the station opened the growth of the town took place further south close to the station around the street Stationsvej (the current Jernbanevej).

Despite the explosive increase in traffic, the station's first modest station building existed for 70 years before being replaced by a larger station building in 1918.

From 17 June 1953 to 26 May 1963 Glostrup was the western endpoint of the S-train network. After the S-train line was extended to Taastrup in 1963, trains on the long-distance tracks ceased calling at Glostrup, but the long-distance platform was kept for use during disturbances in the service.

== Architecture ==
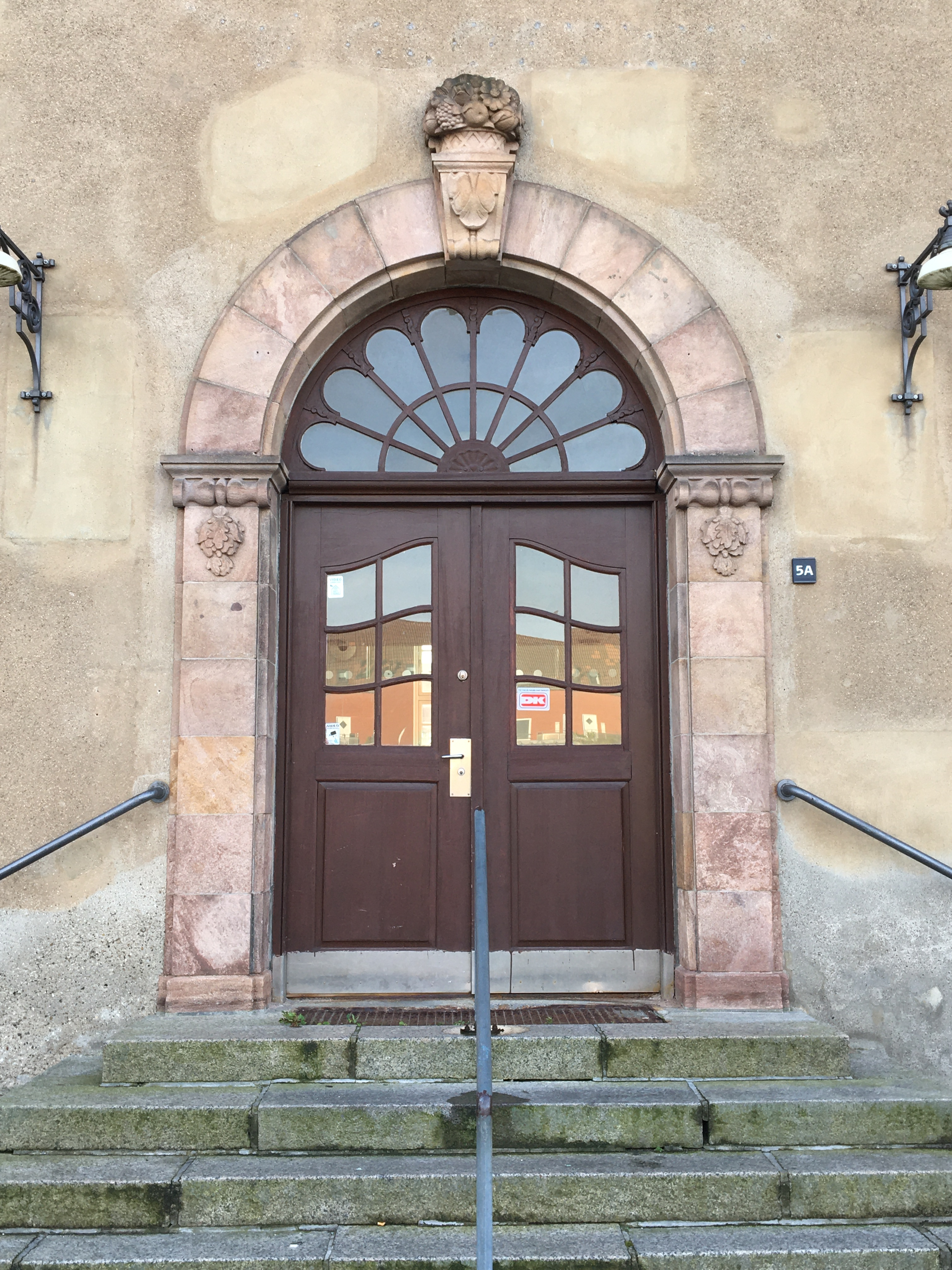
The main entrance to the station building built with sandstone from Nexø on Bornholm

The station's second and current station building was built in 1918 to designs by Danish architect Heinrich Wenck (1851–1936), known for the numerous railway stations he designed across Denmark in his capacity of head architect of the Danish State Railways from 1894 to 1921.

== Facilities ==
Inside the station's underpass there is a combined ticket office and convenience store operated by 7-Eleven.

The station also has a bicycle parking station as well as a car park with approximately 40 parking spaces near the entrance to the railway station.

== Operations ==
Glostrup station is served regularly by trains on the B-line of Copenhagen's S-train network which run between Høje Taastrup and Farum via central Copenhagen.

From 2000 to early 2005, direct regional trains between Roskilde and Copenhagen Airport stopped at the long-distance platforms at Glostrup, but this service was discontinued in order to free up capacity on the congested long-distance tracks. There are plans to re-open the long-distance platforms by 2032.

== Future ==
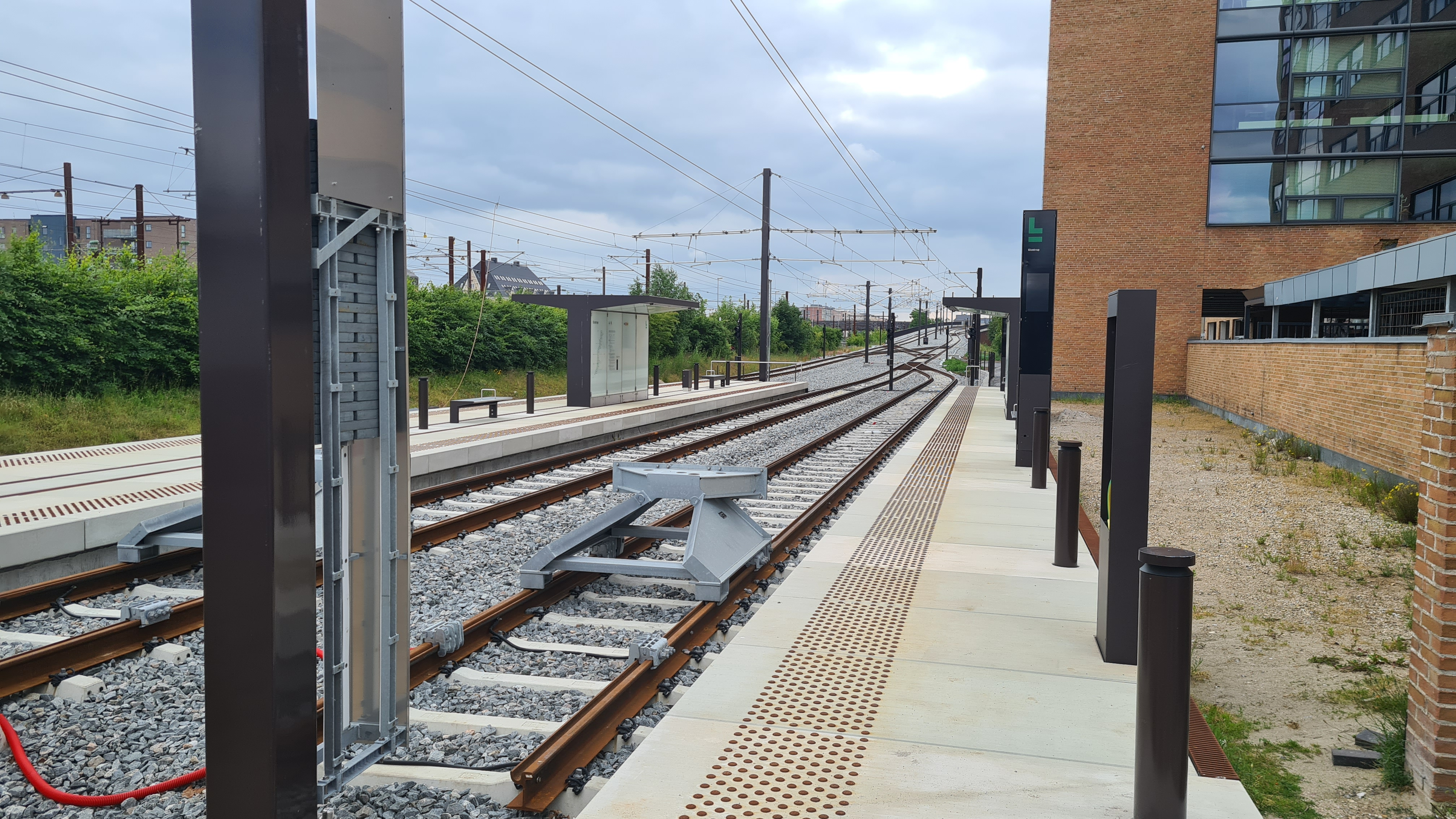
The Glostrup light rail station almost finished in June 2024

Construction has started on construction of the Ring 3 Light Rail, a planned electric light rail system crossing the lines of the S-train in Greater Copenhagen from Lundtofte to Ishøj. It is planned to start operation in 2025. There will be a stop for the light rail at Glostrup station, and there are plans to build a new platform for regional trains along the mainline.

== Cultural references ==
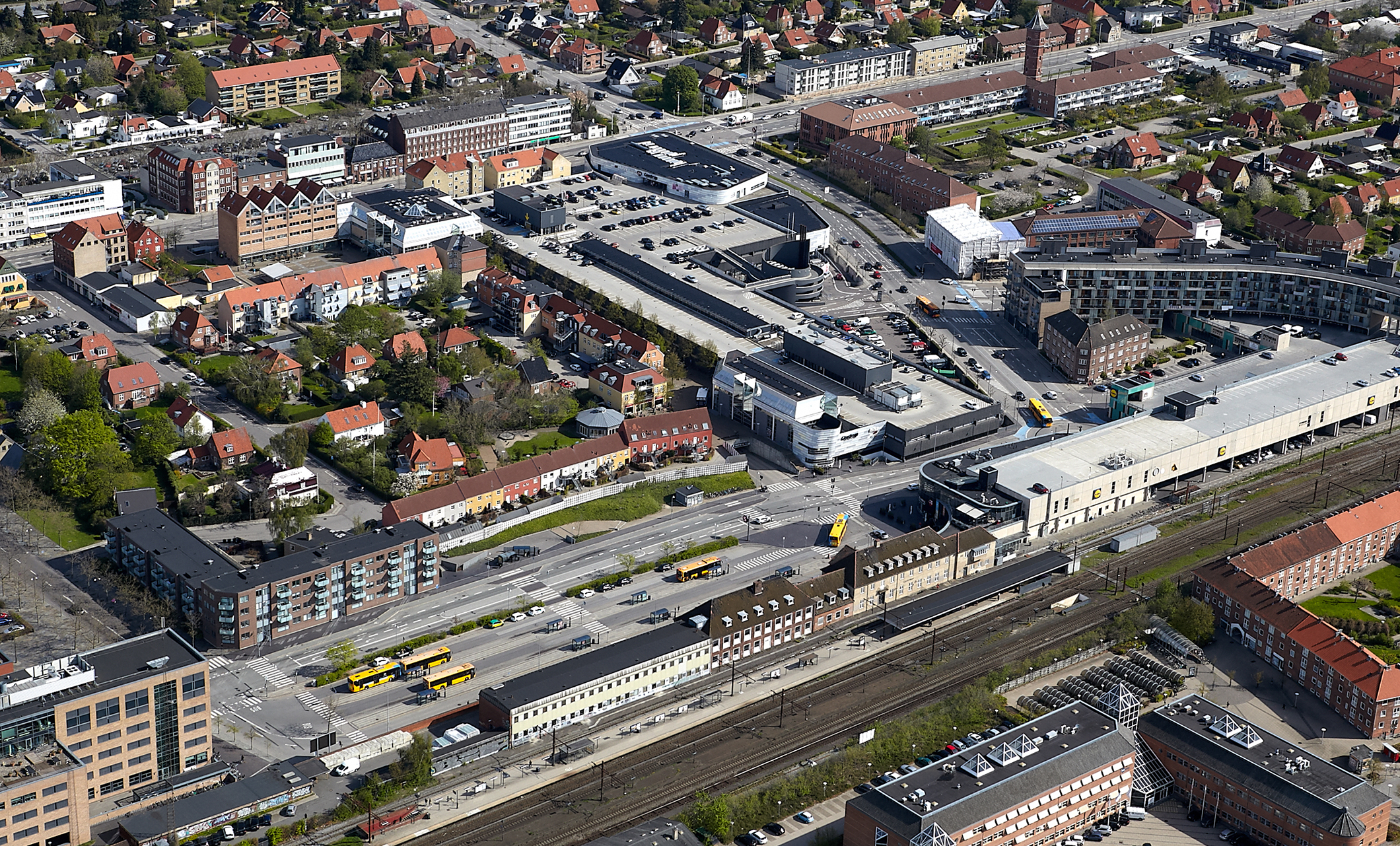
Aerial view of Glostrup station in 2018

Both Glostrup station and the former goods terminal are used as locations in the 1975 Olsen-banden film The Olsen Gang on the Track. Glostrup station is for instance seen at 0:41:55 and again at 1:24:24.

== See also ==
- List of Copenhagen S-train stations
- List of railway stations in Denmark
- Rail transport in Denmark
- Transport in Copenhagen
