= Albertslund railway station =

Suburban railway station in Greater Copenhagen, Denmark

Albertslund
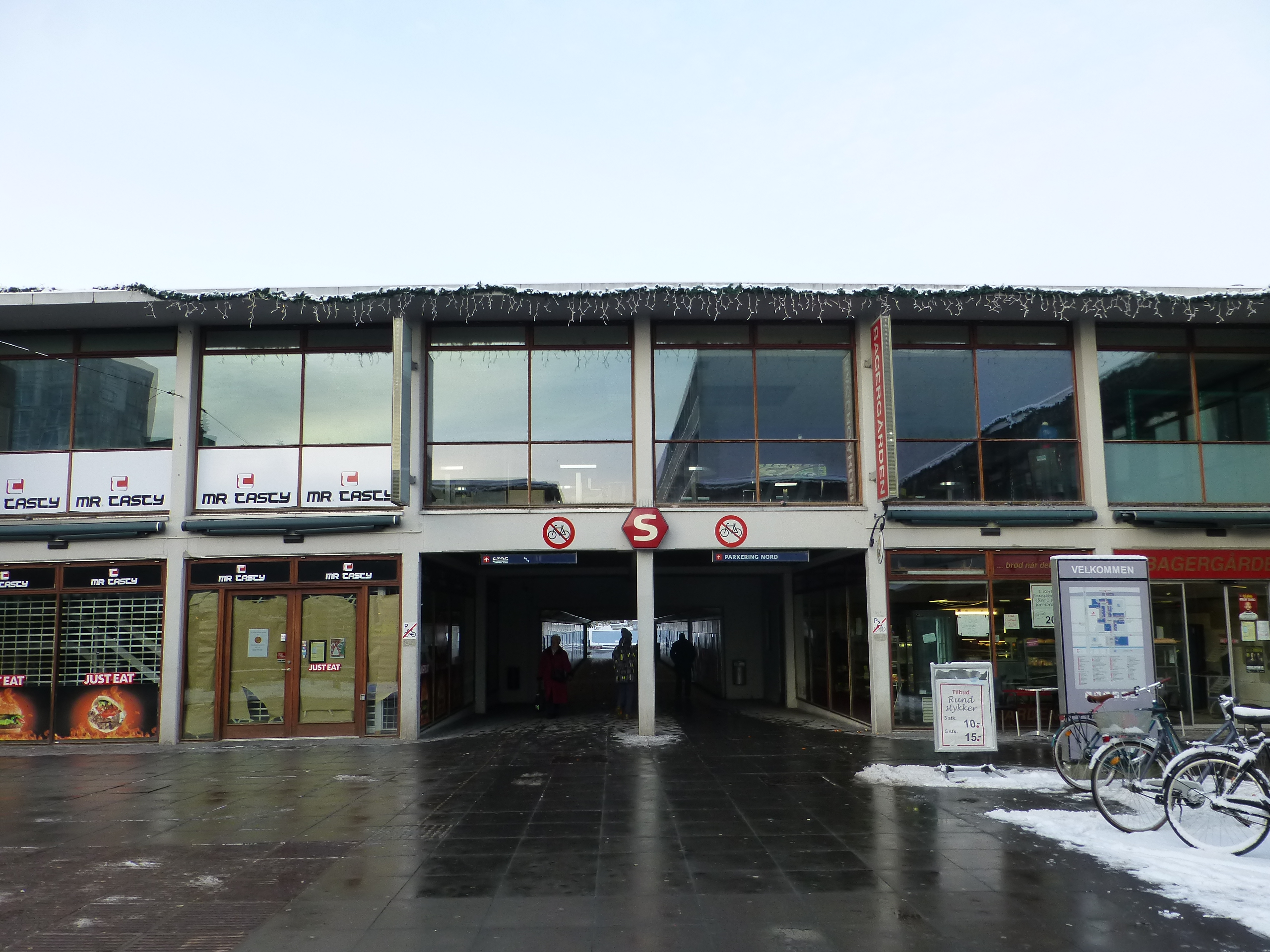
- Albertslund station in 2014

General information
- Location: Hedemarksvej 1; 2620 Albertslund; Albertslund Municipality; Denmark
- Coordinates: 55°39′29″N 12°21′11″E
- Elevation: 13.1 metres (43 ft)
- System: Copenhagen S-train
- Owner: DSB (station infrastructure); Banedanmark (rail infrastructure)
- Line: Høje Taastrup Line
- Platforms: 1 island platform
- Tracks: 2
- Train operators: DSB
- Connections: Bus

Other information
- Station code: Alb
- Website: Official website

History
- Opened: 1931
- Rebuilt: 26 May 1963 (S-train)
- Electrified: 1963 (S-train)
- Former names: Vridsløselille

Services
| Preceding station | S-train | Following station |
|---|---|---|
| Glostrup towards Farum | B | Taastrup towards Høje Taastrup |
| Glostrup towards Buddinge | Bx Peak hours | Taastrup towards Høje Taastrup |
Location
- Location within Greater Copenhagen Location within Denmark

Albertslund station is a suburban rail railway station serving the suburb of Albertslund west of the Danish capital Copenhagen. The station is situated in the central part of the suburb and is integrated in the adjacent open-air shopping centre, Albertslund Centrum.

Albertslund station is located on the Taastrup radial of Copenhagen's S-train network, a hybrid suburban rail and rapid transit system serving Greater Copenhagen. It is served regularly by trains on the B-line which have a journey time to central Copenhagen of around 20 minutes. The station serves the core of Albertslund, whereas the extensive residential areas in the northern part of Albertslund Municipality are served by local buses from Albertslund and the neighbouring Glostrup stations. The station also serves the neighbourhood Vallensbæk Nordmark in the northern part of Vallensbæk Municipality, the boundary of which comes within a few hundred metres from the station.

== History ==
Albertslund station was not one of the original stations on the Copenhagen–Roskilde railway line which opened in 1847. However, before the current S-train station opened, a railway halt on the railway line between Copenhagen and Roskilde existed approximately where Albertslund station is located today. The halt was named Vridsløselille and primarily served the nearby Vridsløselille Prison.

The S-train station at Albertslund opened on 26 May 1963 as the S-train line that runs along the long-distance tracks of the railway line between Copenhagen and Roskilde was extended from Glostrup to Taastrup. The station was to serve the new town of Albertslund, a residential suburb built virtually from scratch in the 1960s and 1970s, with the commercial and administrative centre of the new town, Albertslund Centrum, built up around the station.

== Architecture ==
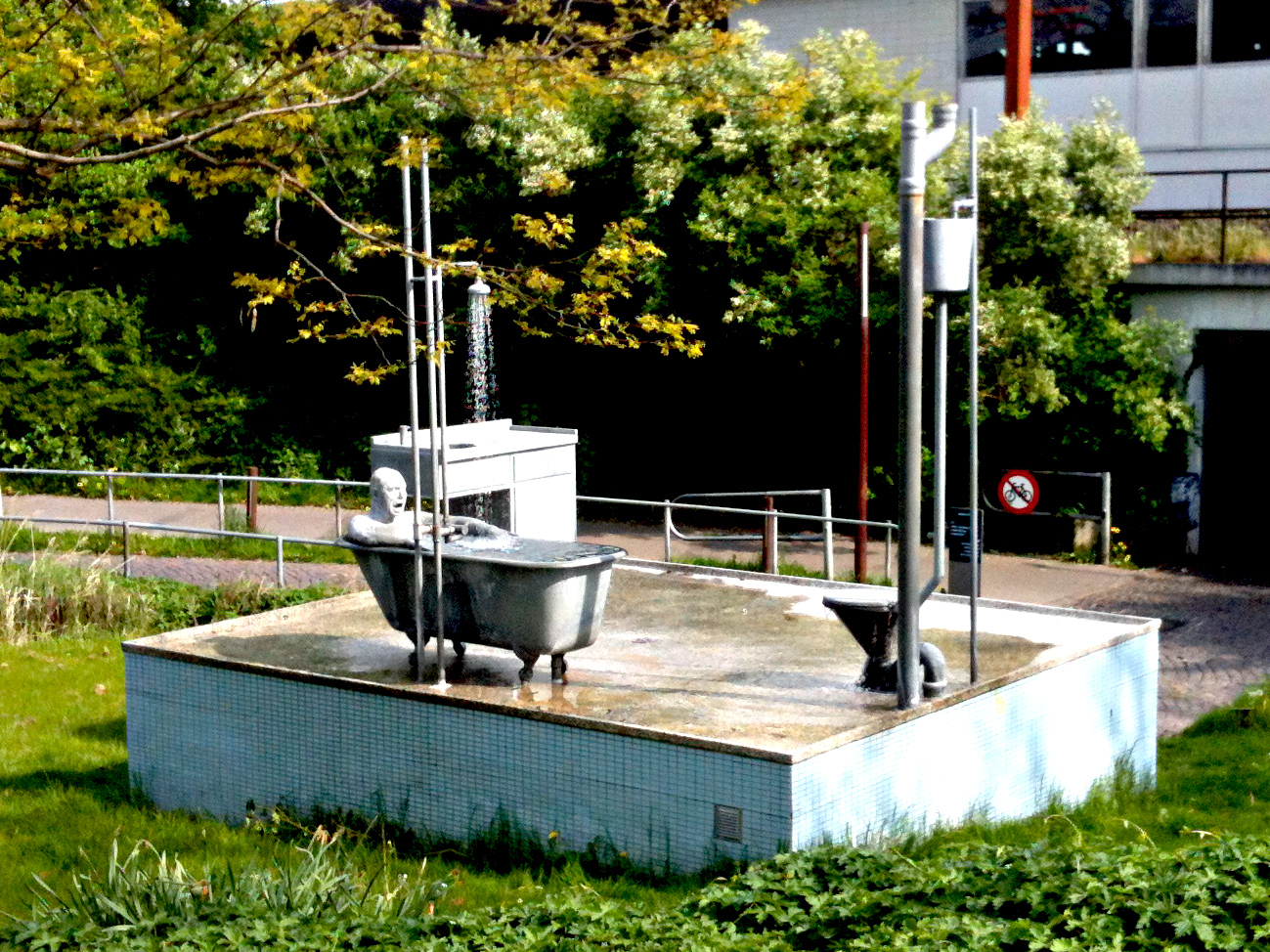
The sculpture Scenarie or The Man in the Bathtub in 2012.

In front of the northern entrance to the station is the bronze water sculpture Scenarie, colloquially known as The Man in the Bathtub, created by the Danish artist Peter Land in 2008.

== Facilities ==
Inside the station building there is a combined ticket office and convenience store operated by 7-Eleven, ticket machines, a waiting room, a photo booth, toilets and an accessible toilet.

The station also has a bicycle parking station as well as a car park with approximately 105 parking spaces near the entrance to the railway station.

== Operations ==
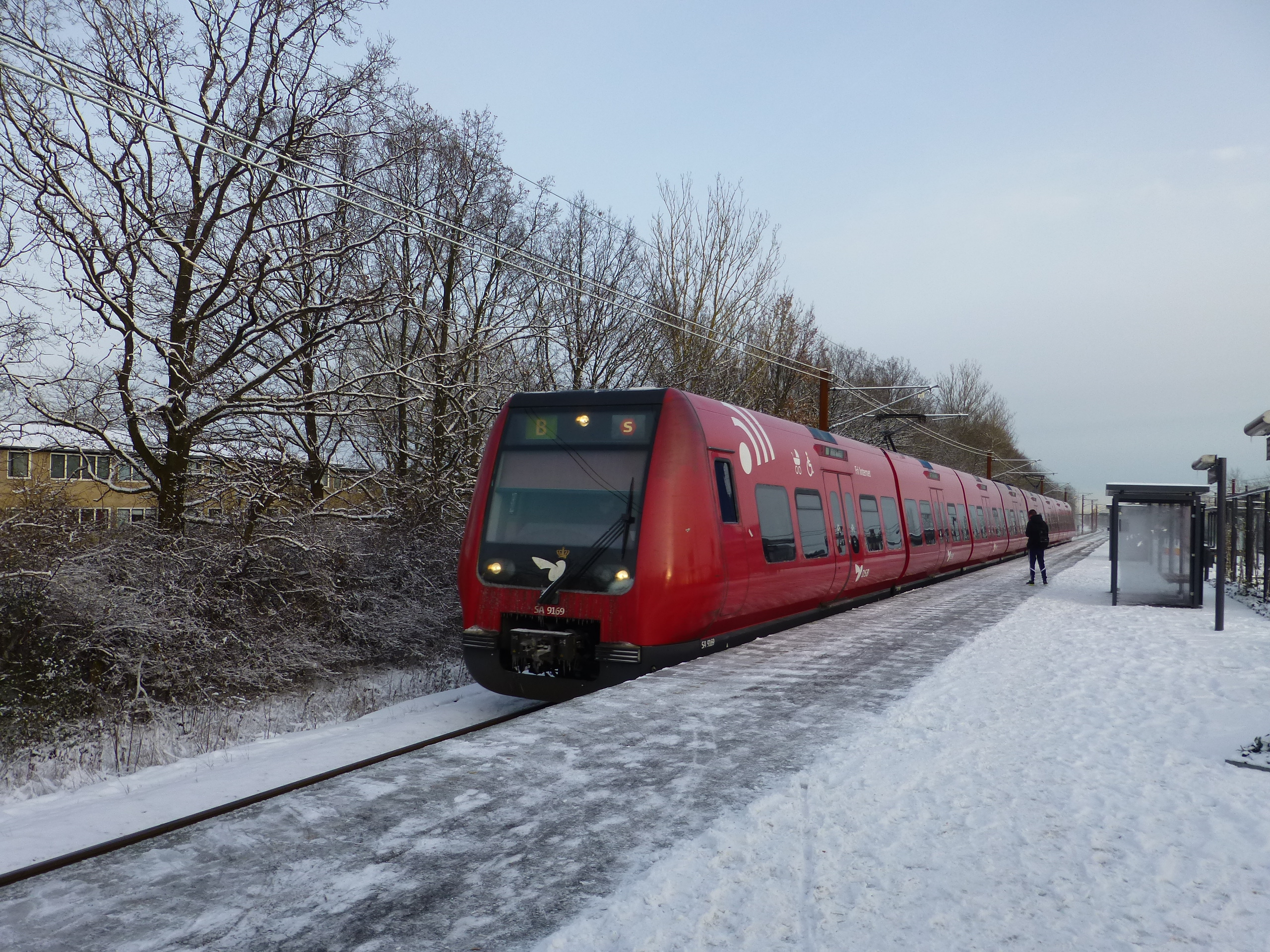
4th generation S-train of the B-line to Høje Taastrup at Albertslund station in 2014.

Albertslund station is served regularly by trains on the B-line of Copenhagen's S-train network which run between Høje Taastrup and Farum via central Copenhagen. The trains have a journey time to central Copenhagen of around 20 minutes.

== Cultural references ==
Albertslund station is used as a location in the 1975 Olsen Gang film The Olsen Gang on the Track where Egon (Ove Sprogøe) is waiting for the S-train at Albertslund station after being released from Vridsløselille Prison at 0:12:55.

== Gallery ==
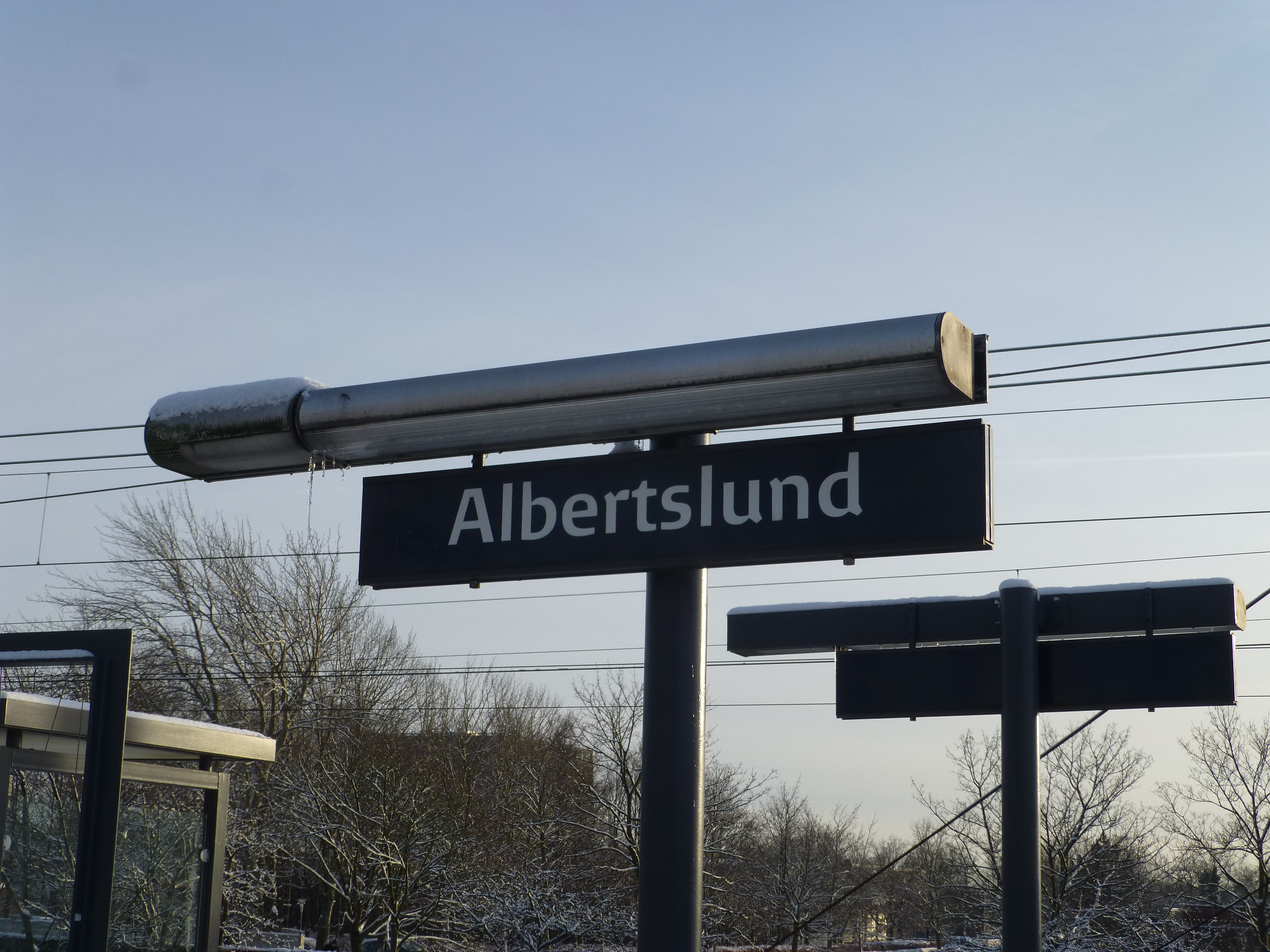
Train station sign

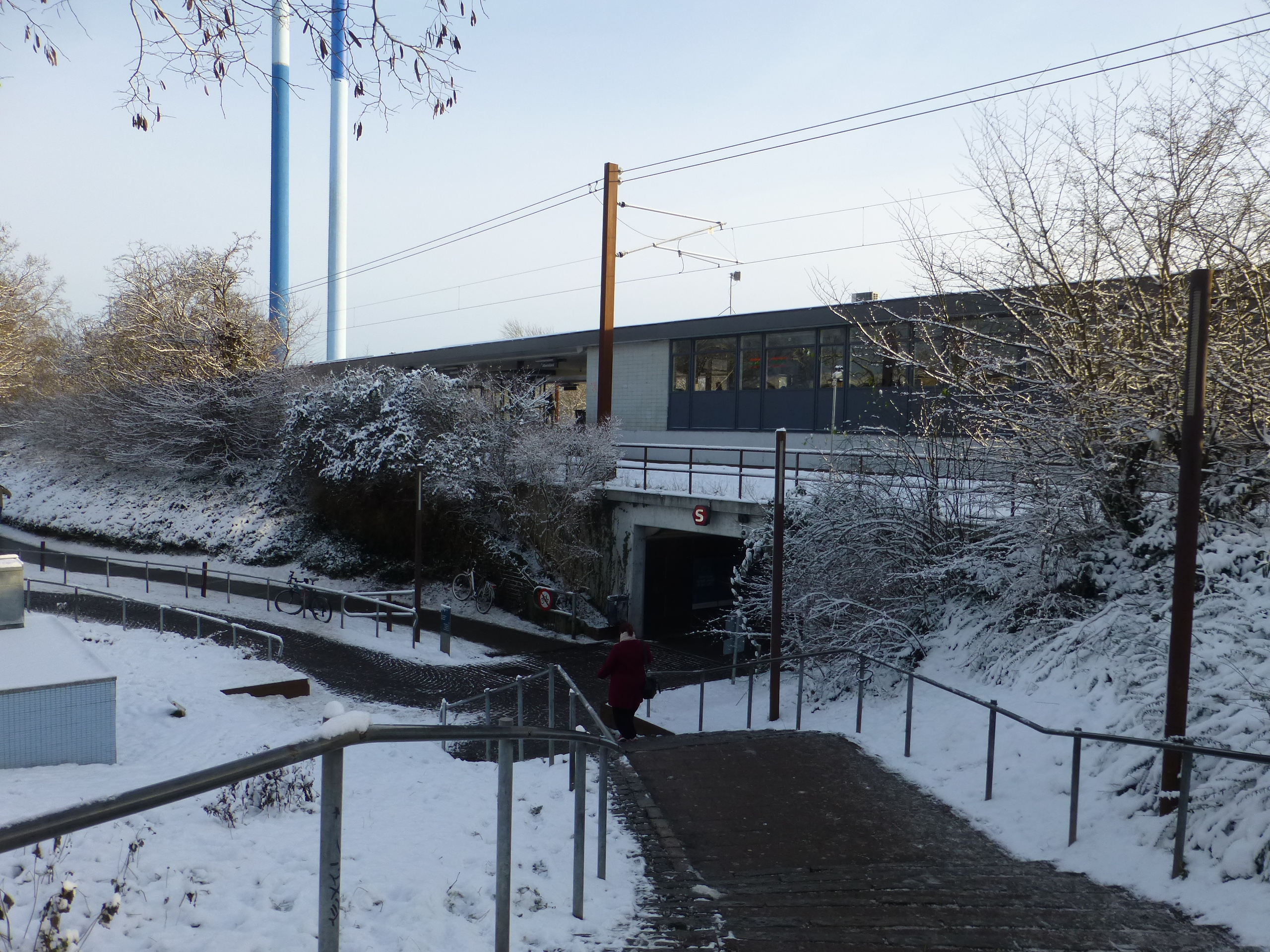
Northern entrance

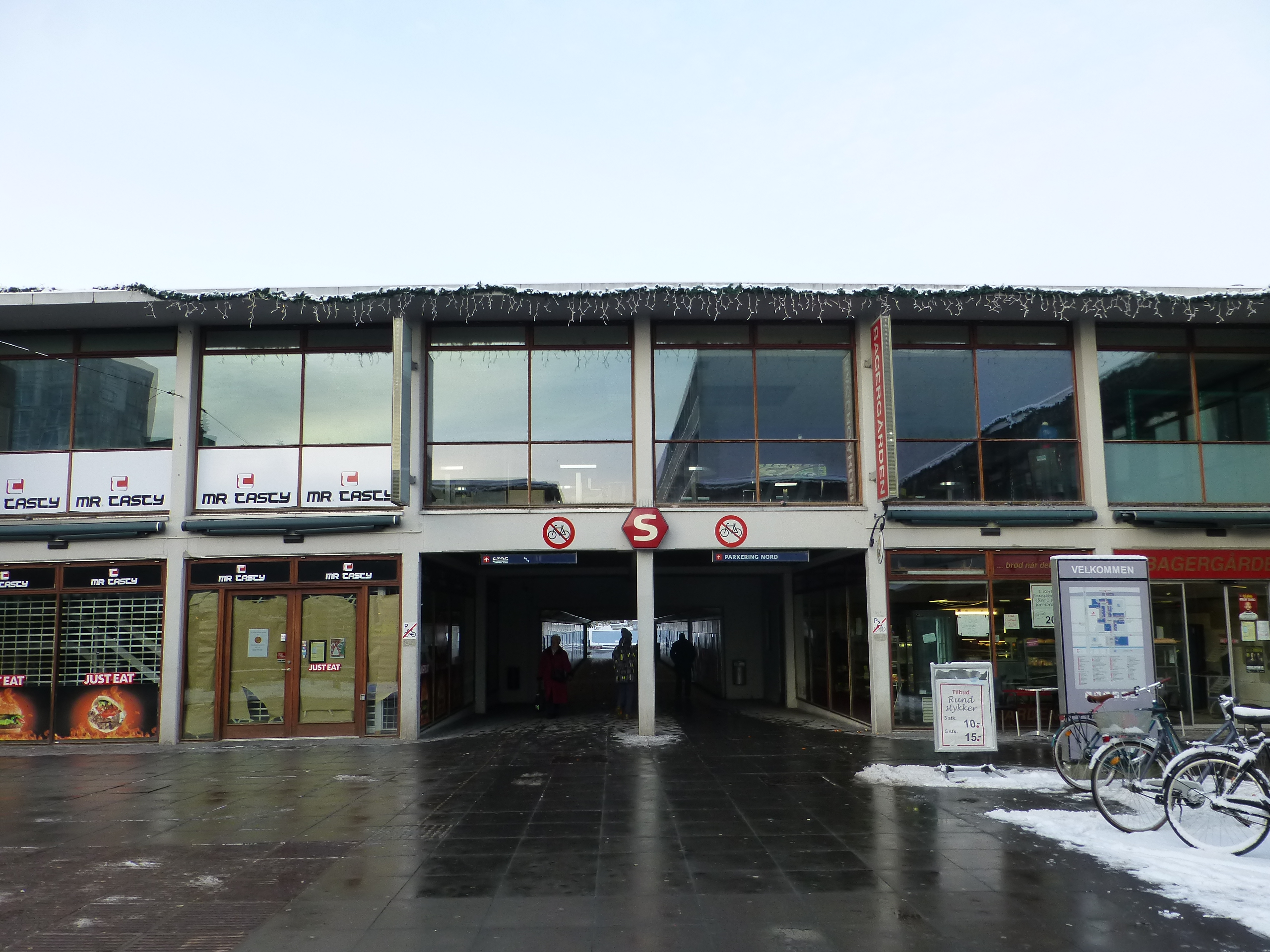
Southern entrance

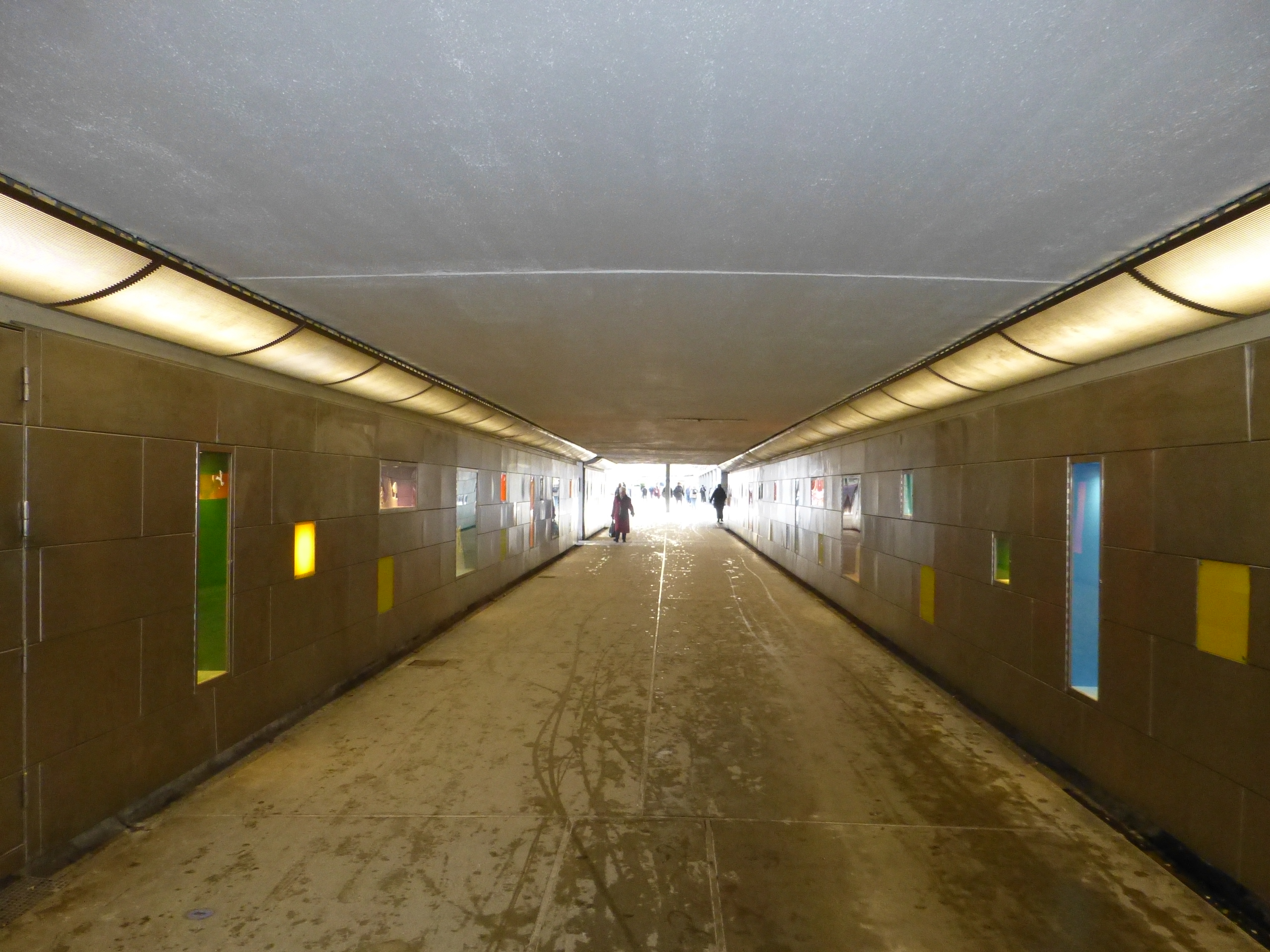
Underpass

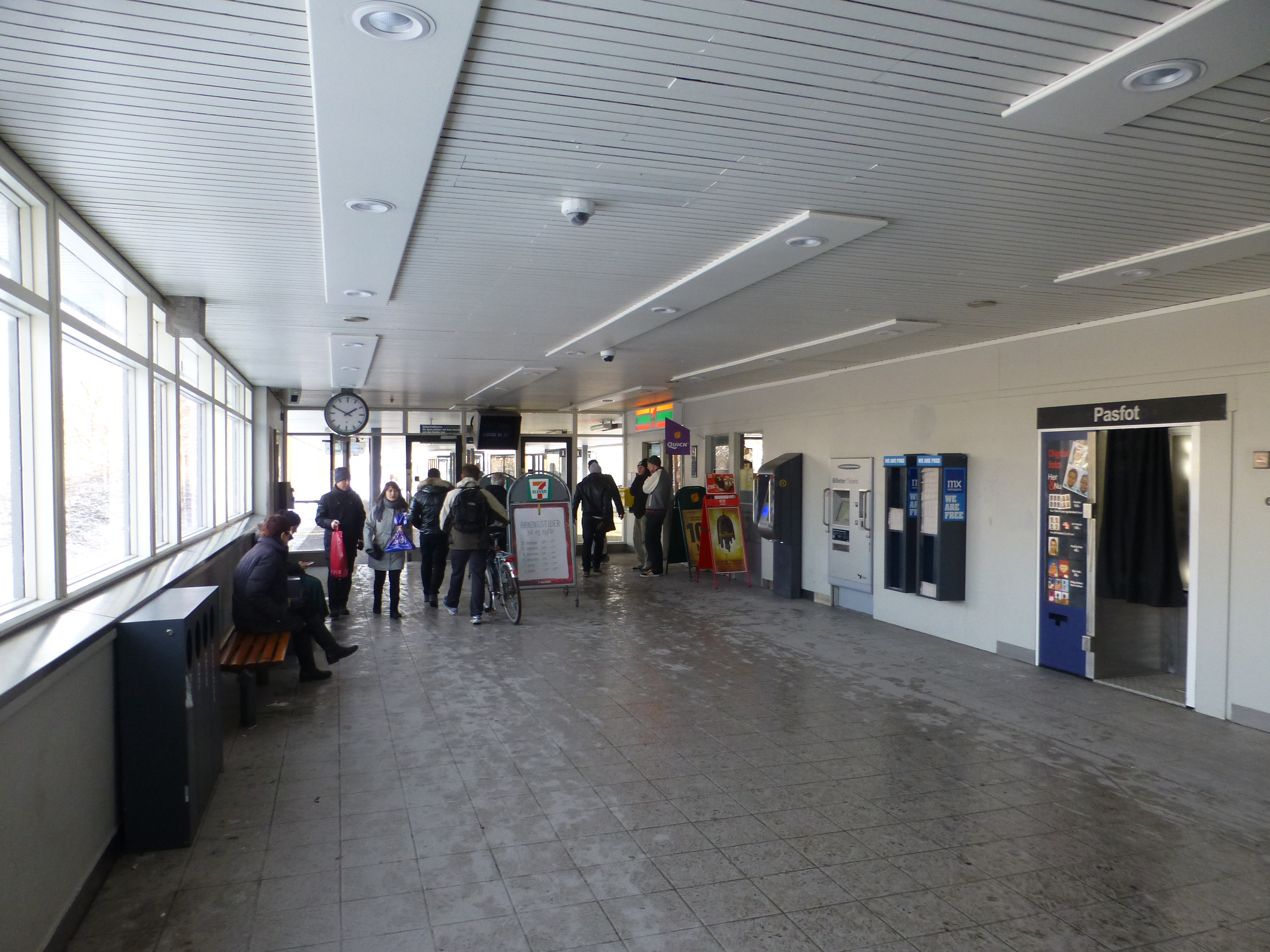
Interior

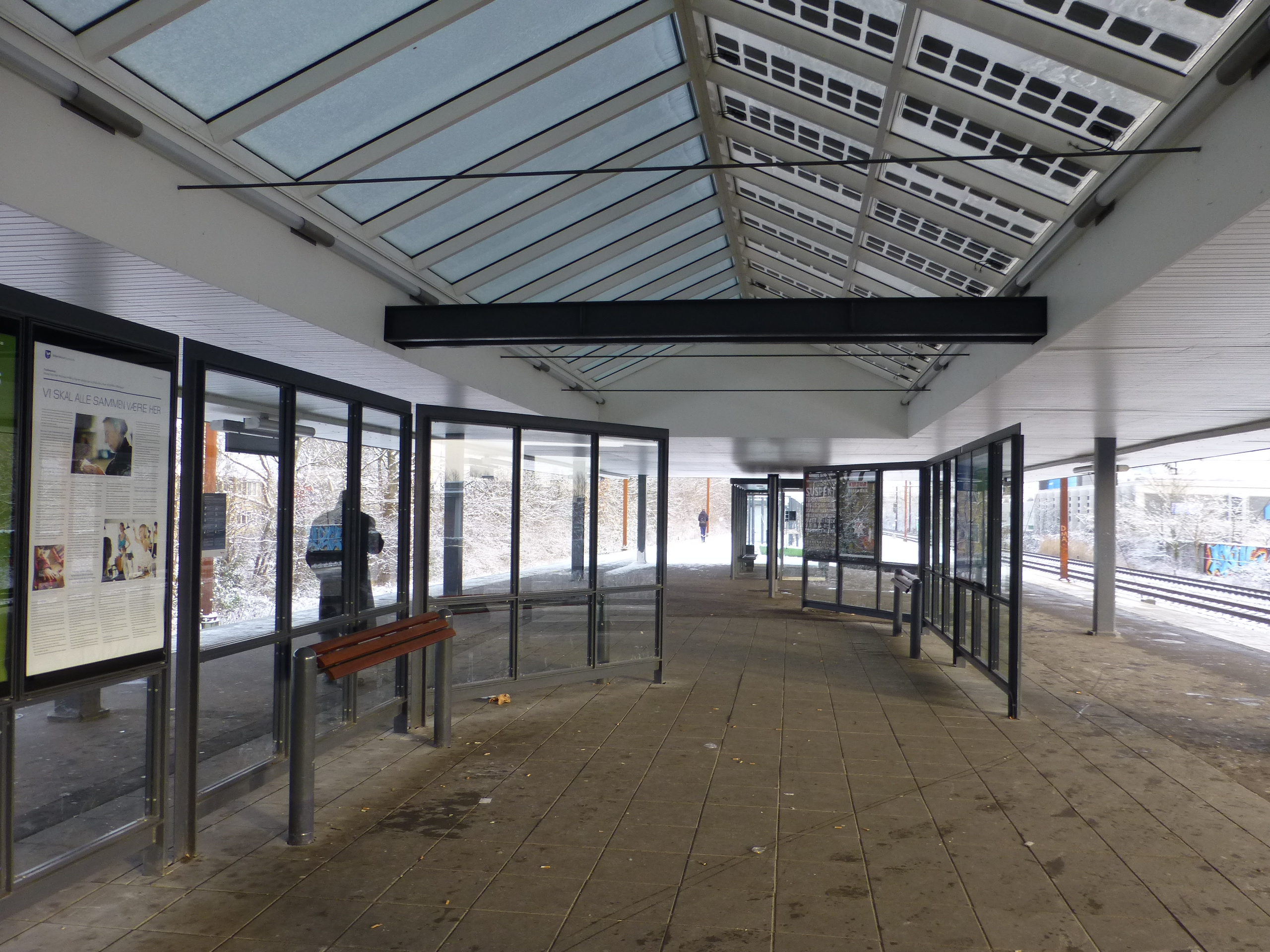
Platform

== See also ==
- List of Copenhagen S-train stations
- List of railway stations in Denmark
- Rail transport in Denmark
- Transport in Copenhagen
