= Kildebakke railway station =

Commuter railway station in Greater Copenhagen, Denmark

Kildebakke
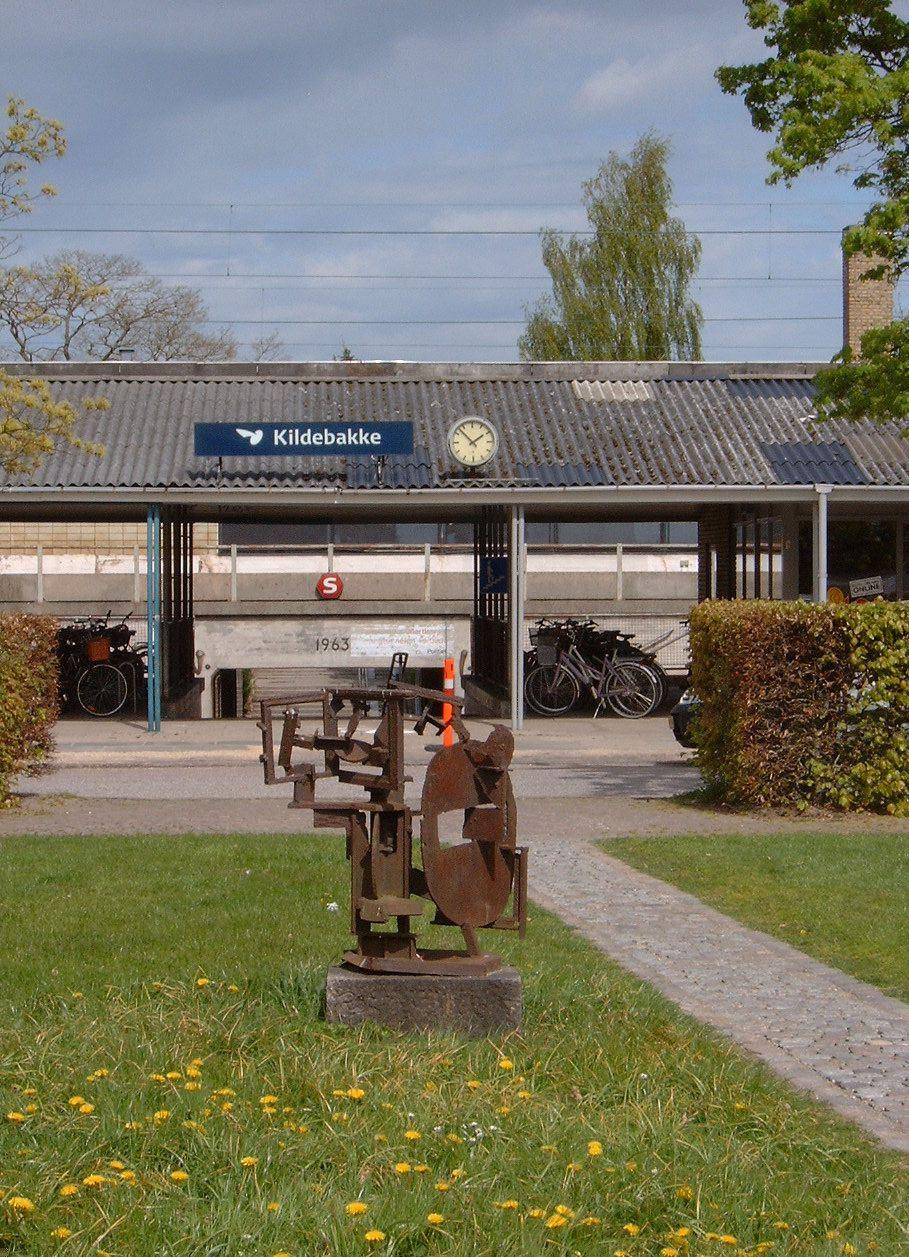
- Kildebakke station in 2007

General information
- Location: Butikstorvet Solnavej; 2860 Søborg; Gladsaxe Municipality; Denmark
- Coordinates: 55°44′41″N 12°30′28″E
- Elevation: 28.9 metres (95 ft)
- Owner: DSB (station infrastructure); Banedanmark (rail infrastructure)
- Platforms: Island platform
- Tracks: 2
- Train operators: DSB

History
- Opened: 1935
- Rebuilt: 1977

Services
Preceding station	S-train	Following station
Buddinge towards Farum	B	Vangede towards Høje Taastrup
Buddinge Terminus	Bx Peak hours	Vangede towards Høje Taastrup
Location

Kildebakke station (literally, "Spring Hill" station) is an S-train station serving the suburb of Søborg northwest of Copenhagen, Denmark. The station is located on the Farum radial of the Copenhagen S-train network.

== See also ==
- List of Copenhagen S-train stations
- List of railway stations in Denmark
