= Taastrup railway station =

Railway station in Greater Copenhagen, Denmark

Taastrup
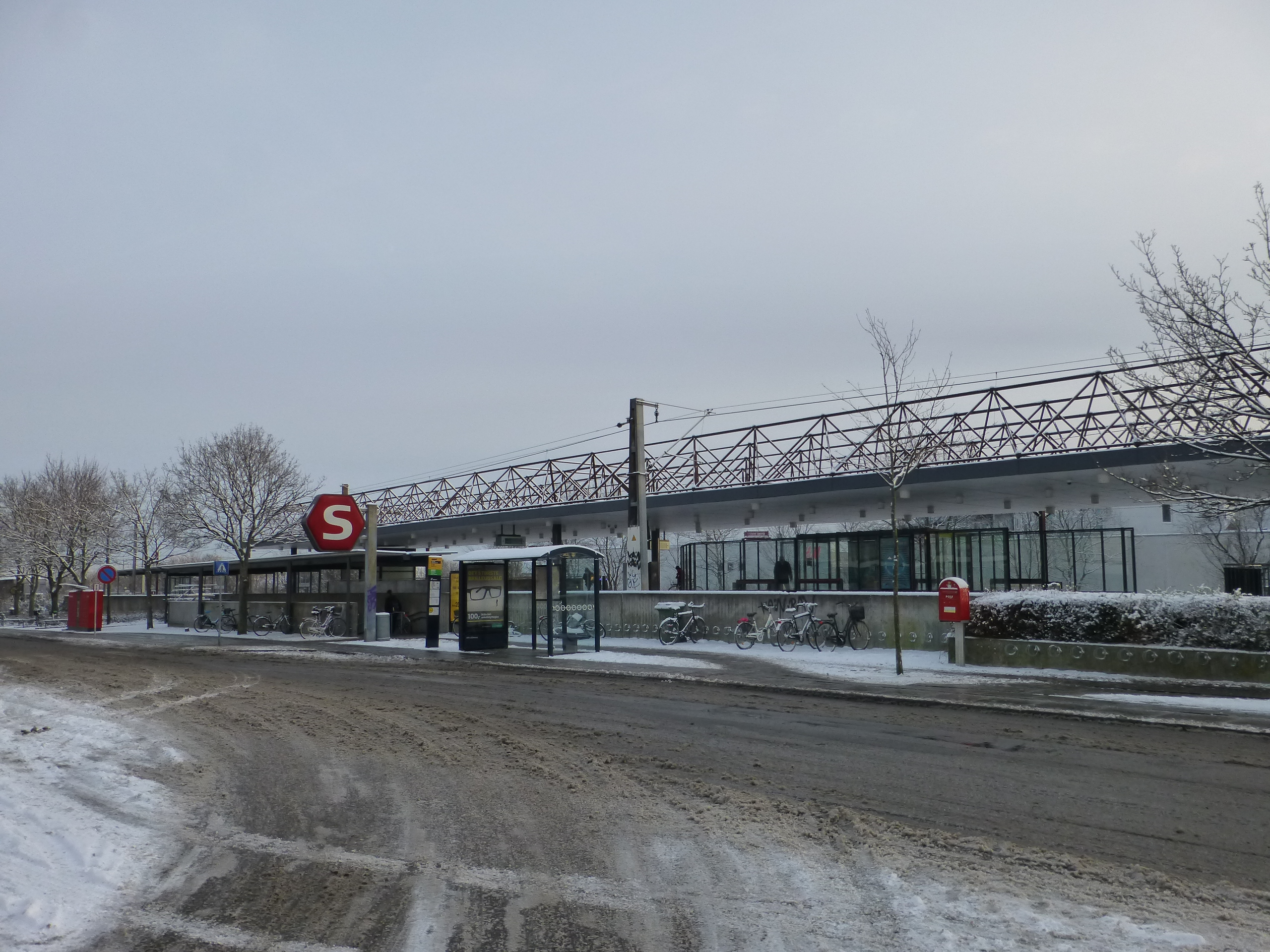
- Taastrup station in 2014

General information
- Location: Selsmosevej 5; 2630 Taastrup; Høje-Taastrup Municipality; Denmark
- Coordinates: 55°39′09″N 12°18′07″E
- Elevation: 20.1 metres (66 ft)
- Owner: DSB (station infrastructure); Banedanmark (rail infrastructure)
- Platforms: Island platform
- Tracks: 2
- Train operators: DSB

Construction
- Architect: Heinrich Wenck (1918)

History
- Opened: 26 June 1847
- Rebuilt: 26 May 1963 (S-train)
- Electrified: 1963 (S-train)

Services
Preceding station	S-train	Following station
Albertslund towards Farum	B	Høje Taastrup Terminus
Albertslund towards Buddinge	Bx Peak hours	Høje Taastrup Terminus
Location

Taastrup station (Danish pronunciation: [ˈtsʰʌˌstʁɔp stæˈɕoˀn]) is a Copenhagen S-train railway station serving the railway town/suburb of Taastrup west of Copenhagen, Denmark. It is located on the Taastrup radial of Copenhagen's S-train network.

== History ==
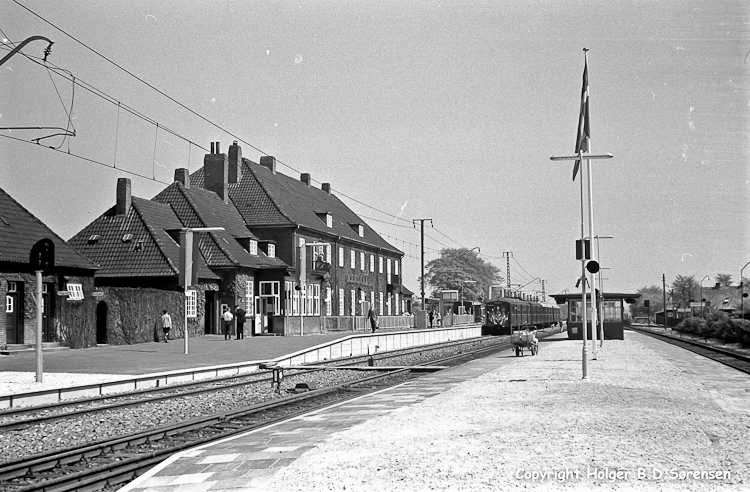
Taastrup Station with the now demolished station building

Taastrup station was one of the original intermediate stops on the new railway line from Copenhagen to Roskilde, the first railway line in the Kingdom of Denmark (Note: The first railway line in the then Danish Monarchy was the Kiel-Altona railway line in the Duchy of Holstein which had been completed three years earlier. However, the Duchy of Holstein was later lost to the Kingdom of Prussia after the Second Schleswig War in 1864, and that railway line is today part of the German rail network.). It was inaugurated on 26 June 1847, and the following day the railway opened to regular traffic with three trains daily in each direction. At the opening, the station was named Kiøgevejen, as it is located where the railway line crosses the old highway to Køge.

The station was later converted into an S-train station.

== Architecture ==
Taastrup station's stately station building was built in 1918 to designs by the Danish architect Heinrich Wenck (1851–1936), known for the numerous railway stations he designed across Denmark in his capacity of head architect of the Danish State Railways. The old station building was demolished in 1979.

== Service ==
Taastrup Station is served by B trains.

== In popular culture ==
The old Taastrup station is used as a location in the 1951 film Lyntoget.

== See also ==
- List of Copenhagen S-train stations
- List of railway stations in Denmark
