= B (S-train) =

B, Bx

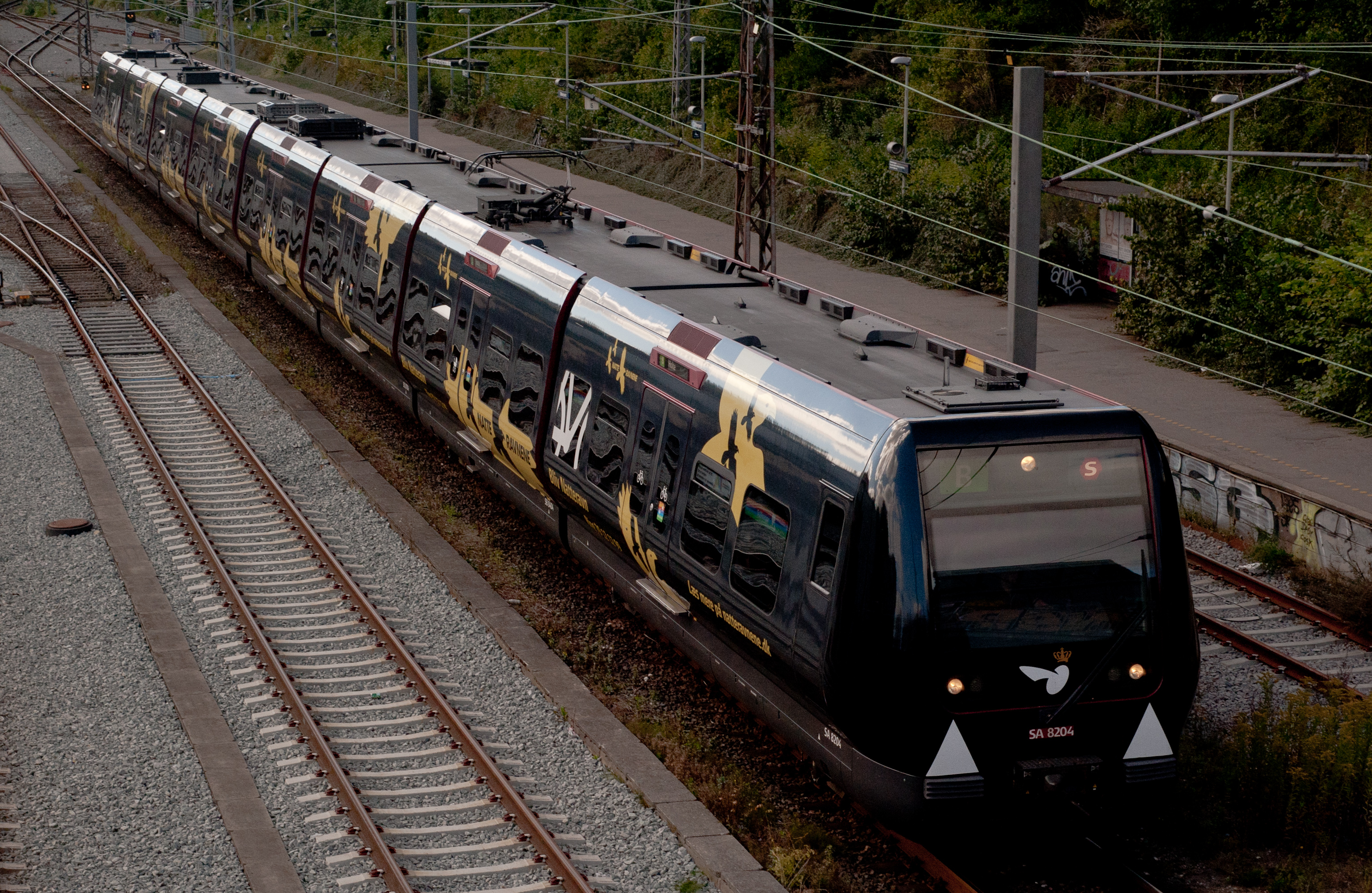
- An advertisement train at Østerport station

Overview
- Status: Operational
- Owner: Banedanmark
- Locale: Metropolitan Copenhagen
- Termini: Farum; Høje Taastrup
- Stations: 29

Service
- Type: Suburban rail, urban rail
- System: S-train
- Operator(s): DSB

History
- Opened: 15 May 1934; 91 years ago

Technical
- Line length: 39 km (24 mi)
- Number of tracks: 2
- Track gauge: 1,435 mm (4 ft 8 1/2 in) standard gauge
- Electrification: 1500 V DC overhead lines
- Operating speed: 120 km/h (75 mph)

B is a service on the S-train network in Copenhagen. It runs between Farum and Høje Taastrup and provides stopping services on the S-train system's Farum radia and Tåstrup radial.

B is one of the base services on the network, running every 20 minutes from about 5:00 to 1:00 every day, and every 10 minutes between about 6:00 to 19:00 on weekdays. On Friday and Saturday nights there is also a 30 minutes service throughout the night.

S-train system map

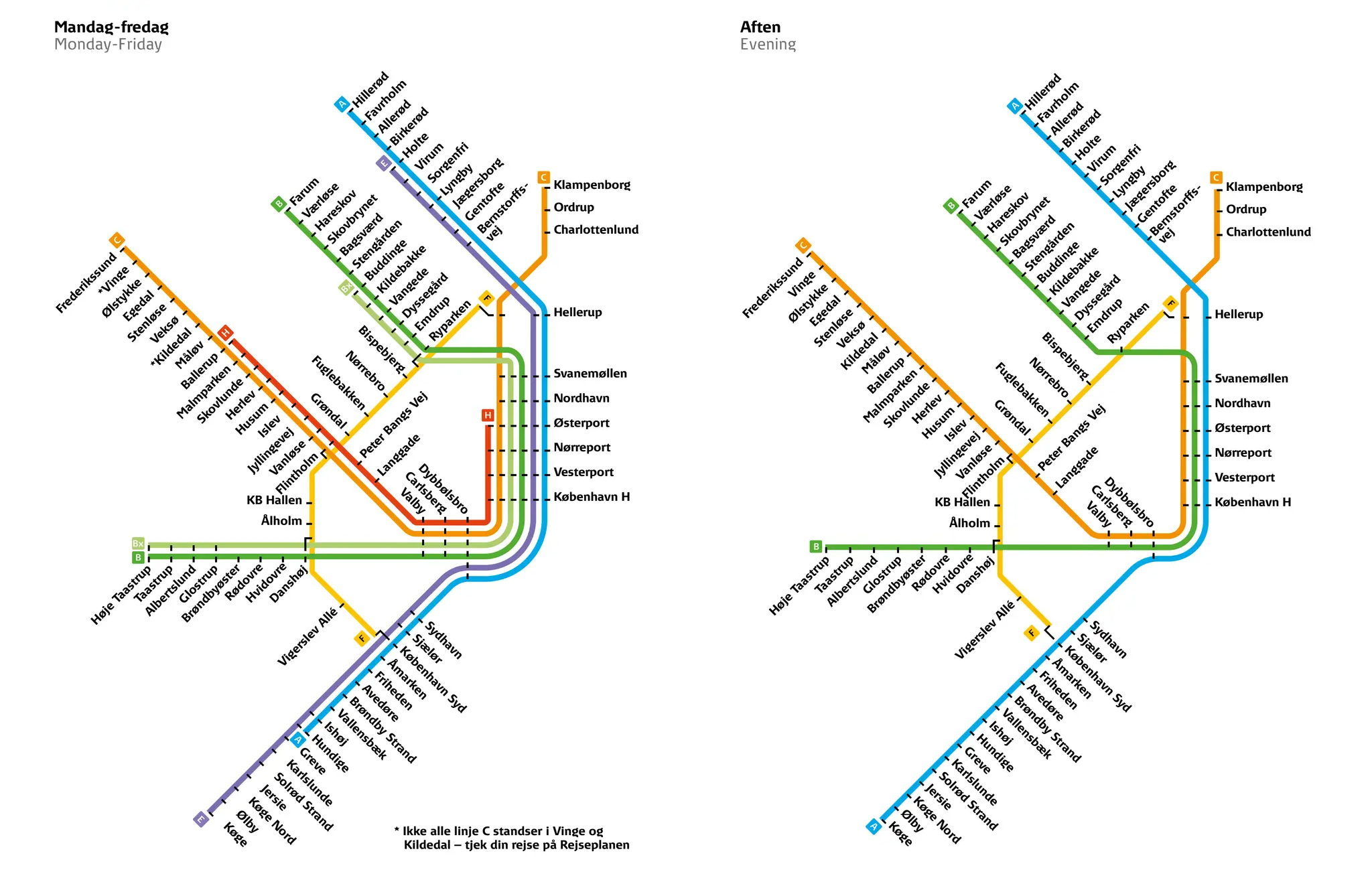
S-train system map

== History ==
Since the first part of the Taastrup radial opened in 1953, letter B has been used for its principal service. Before that the characteristic of service B was that it was the stopping trains to Holte.

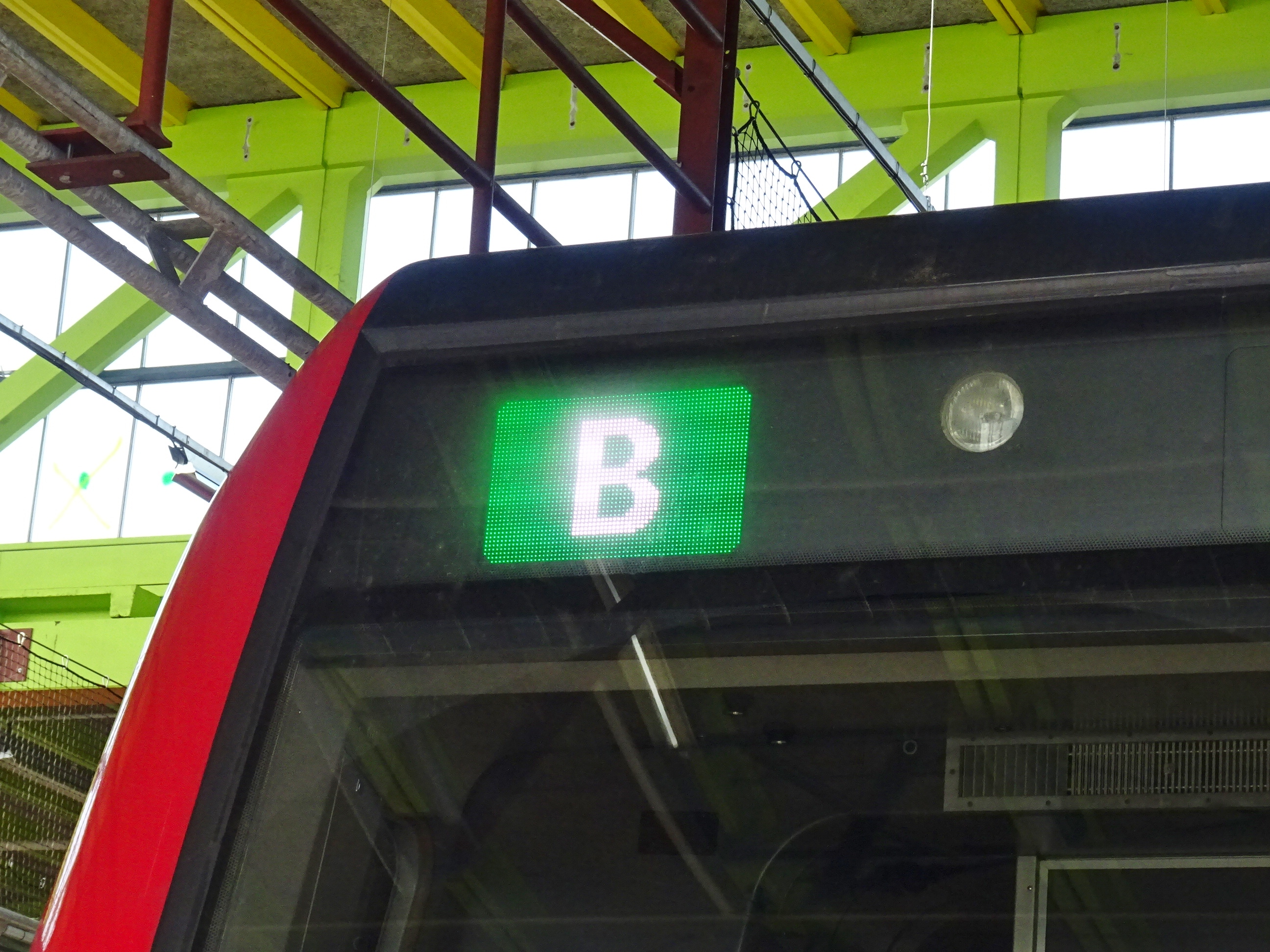

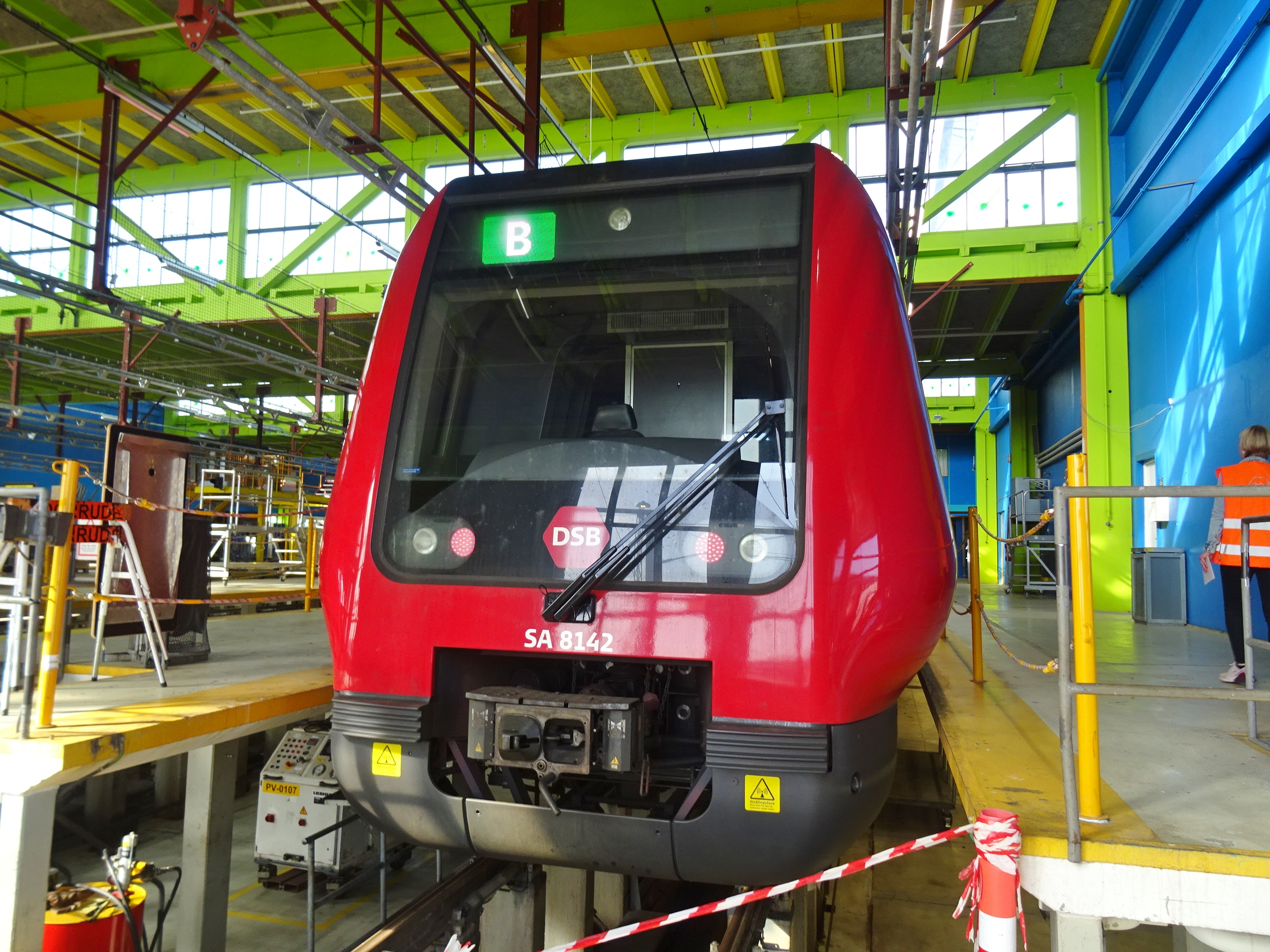

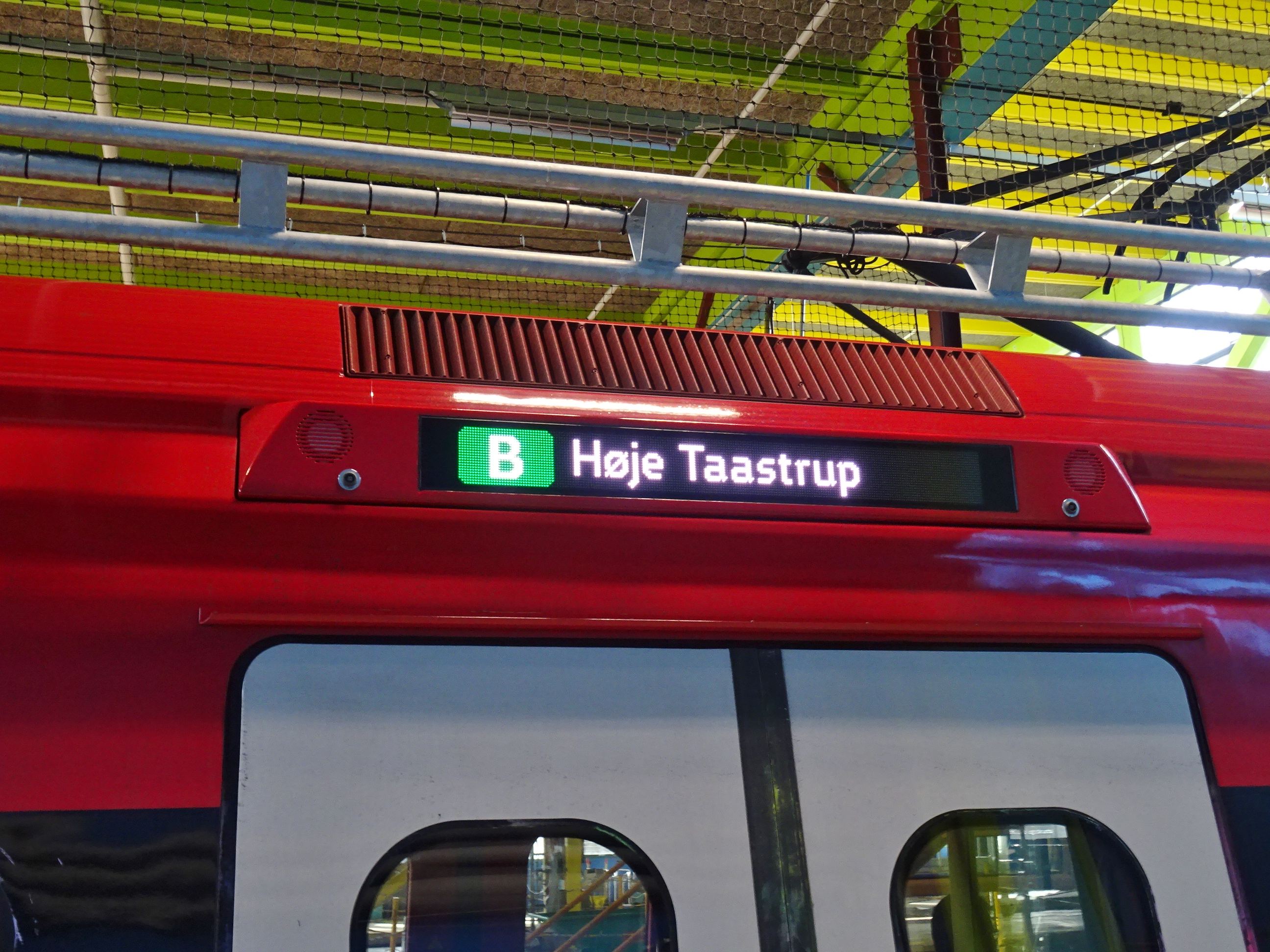

Name	Southern end	Years	Northern end
1b	terminated at København H	1936–1940	Nordbanen: all stops to Holte
1b	Frederikssundbanen: all stops to Valby	1940–1941	Nordbanen: all stops to Holte
1b	all stops to Vanløse	1941–1949	Nordbanen: all stops to Holte
1b	all stops to Ballerup	1949–1950	Nordbanen: all stops to Holte
BO	The route and stops were changed multiple times during its operation.	1969-1972	Nordbanen: all stops to Holte
	terminated at København H	1950–1953	Nordbanen: all stops to Holte
	Vestbanen: all stops to Glostrup	1953–1963	Nordbanen: all stops to Holte
	all stops to Taastrup	1963–1979	Nordbanen: all stops to Holte
	all stops to Taastrup	1979–1986	Hareskovbanen: all stops to Farum
	all stops to Høje Taastrup	1986–1989	Hareskovbanen: all stops to Farum
	all stops to Høje Taastrup	1989–2018	Nordbanen: all stops to Holte
	all stops to Høje Taastrup	2018–	Hareskovbanen: all stops to Farum

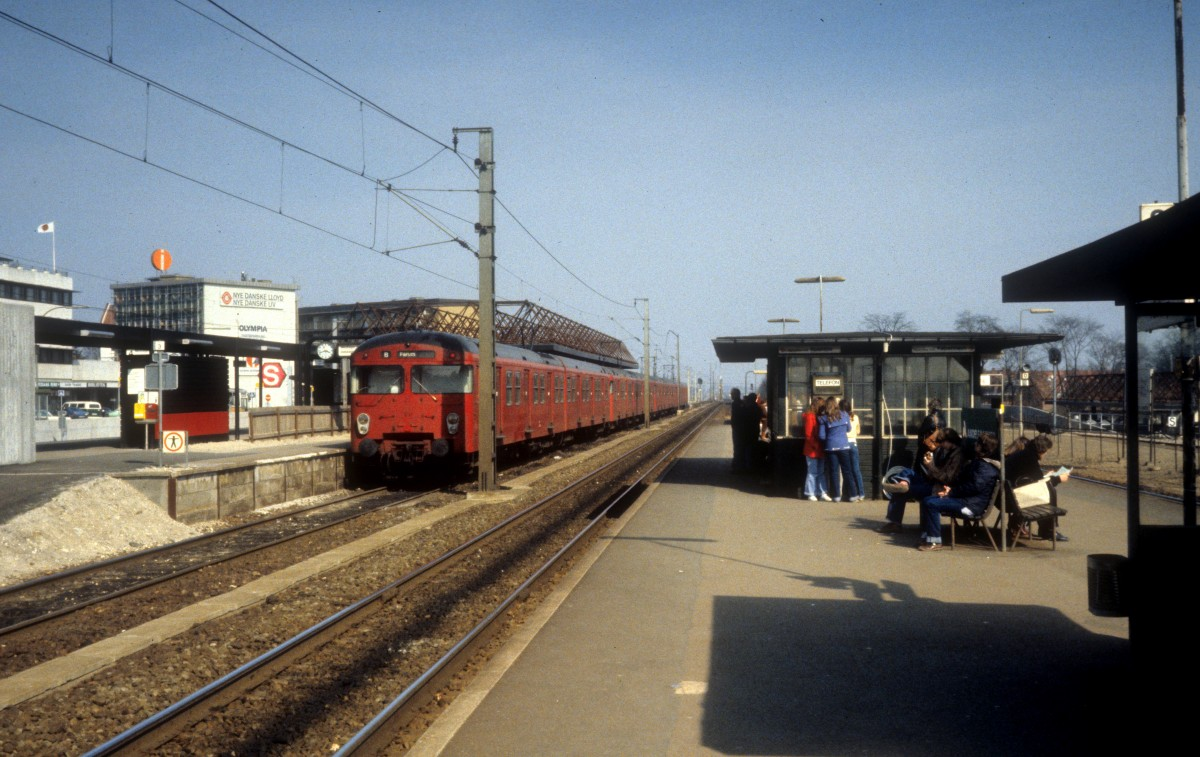
Line B at Taastrup Station.

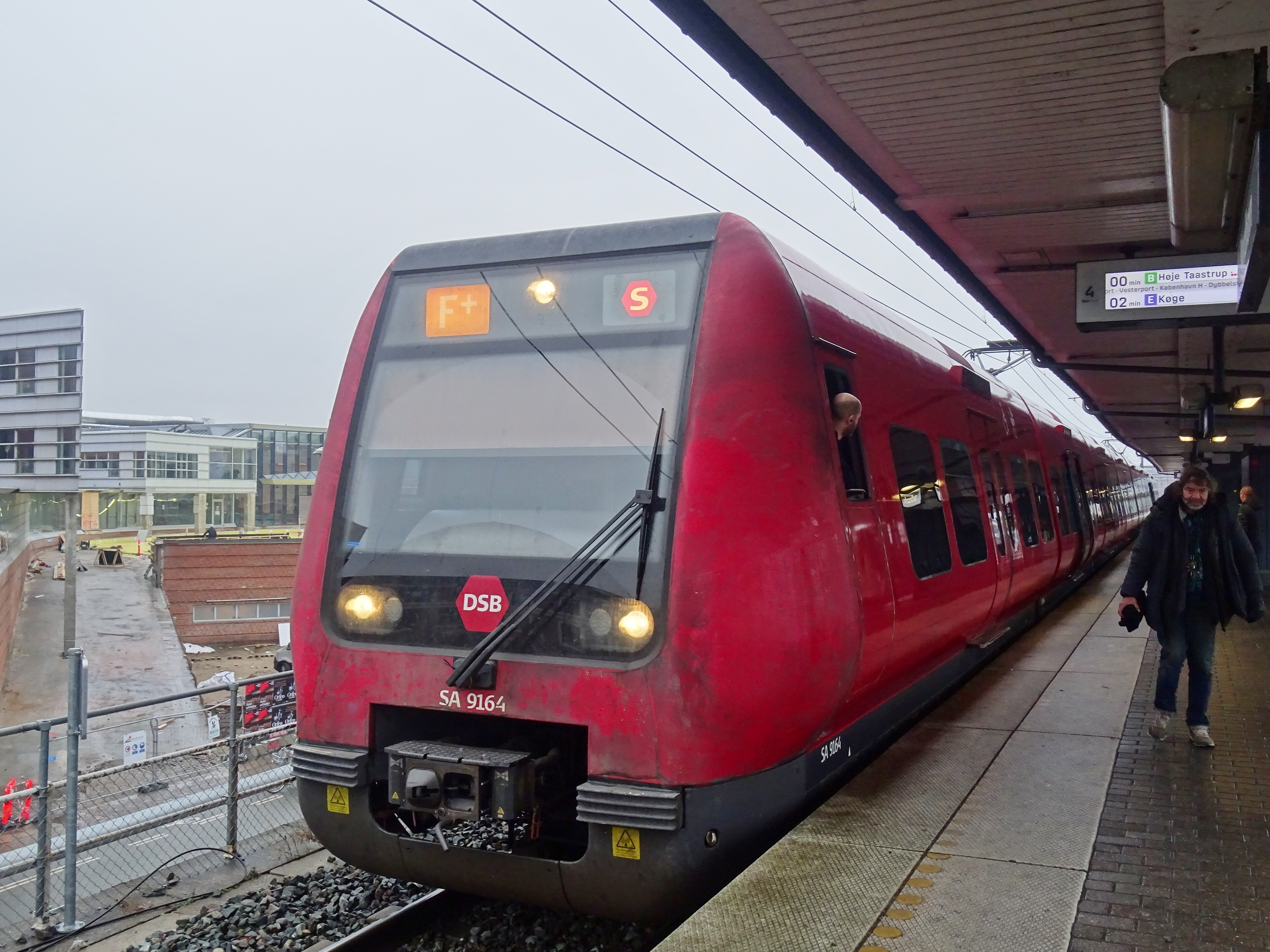
S-train line as Line F+ at Nordhavn Station.

=== BO ===
Date	Line layout	Notes
28-09-1969	Glostrup - Copenhagen H	Non-stop Valby-Copenhagen H. From Glostrup in the morning and to Glostrup in the afternoon.
31-05-1970	(Taastrup -) Glostrup - Copenhagen H	Non-stop Valby-Copenhagen H. From Taastrup in the morning and to Glostrup in the afternoon.
01-10.1972	1969-1972, The route and stops were changed multiple times during its operation. Discontinued and replaced by extension of Line	

=== Bb, L, B+ ===
From 1972 to 1979, the service on the Taastrup branch was supplemented on weekdays by service E (q.v.). In 1979 a separate daytime reinforcement service Bb was created; it ran every 20 minutes with a 10-minute offset to service B such that the Tåstrup radial effectively had a 10-minute frequency. Under the timetable doctrine followed in those years, a service letter such as B could not be used for more than exactly 3 trains an hour, so a separate service designation was needed for these daytime supplements. They later changed their name to L and then to B+, and were finally folded into B with the 2007 timetable.

Name	Southern end	Years	Northern end
Bb	Vestbanen: all stops to Taastrup	1979–1986	terminated at Hellerup
Bb	all stops to Høje Taastrup	1986–1989	terminated at Hellerup
L	all stops to Høje Taastrup	1989–1995	Nordbanen: all stops to Holte
B+	all stops to Høje Taastrup	1995–2007	Nordbanen: all stops to Holte
Joined into B from September 2007

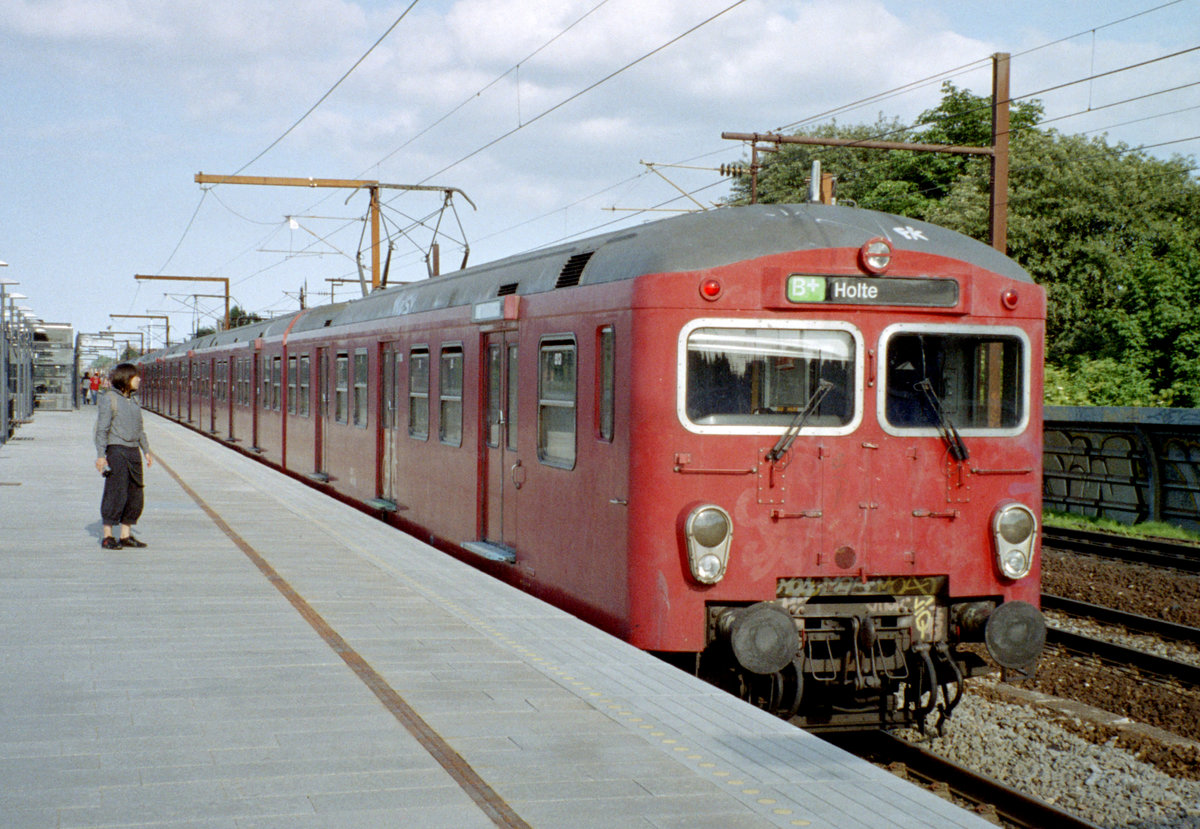
2nd generation S-train on line B+ in Danshøj in 2006.

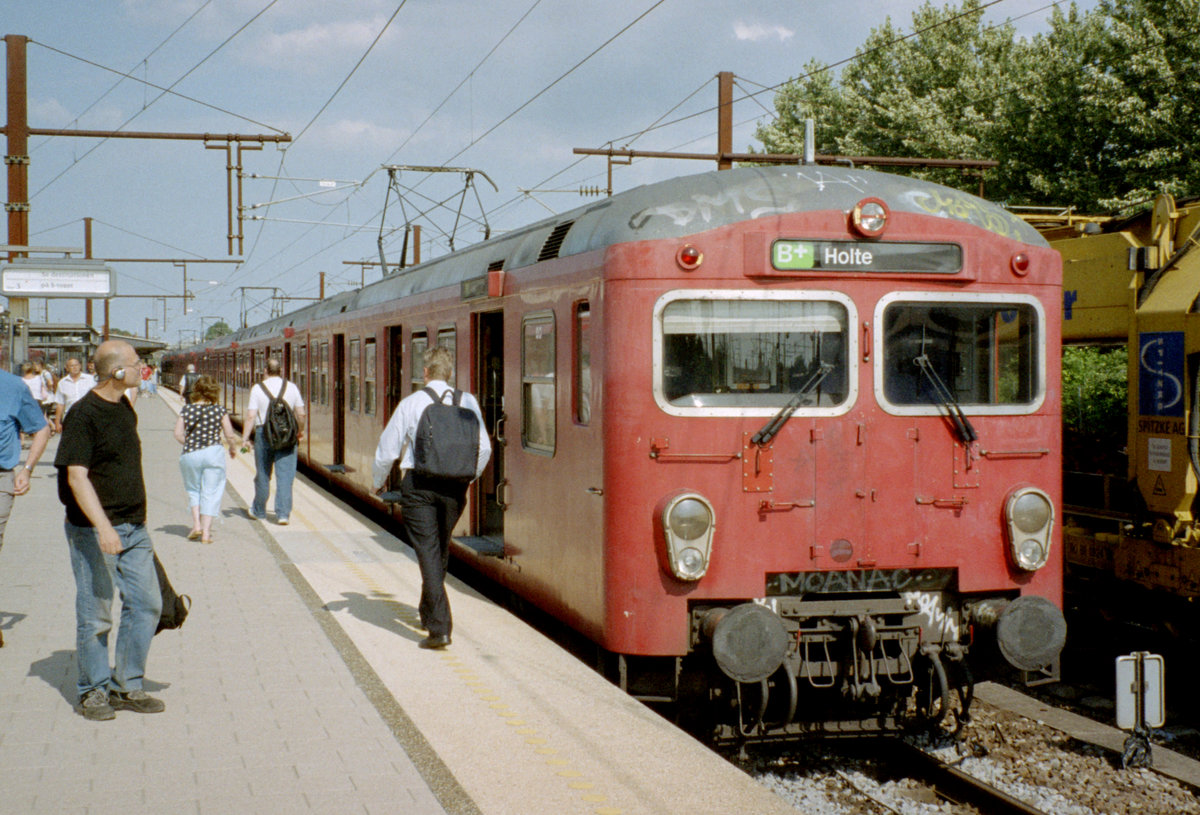
2nd generation S-train on line B+ in Glostrup in 2006.

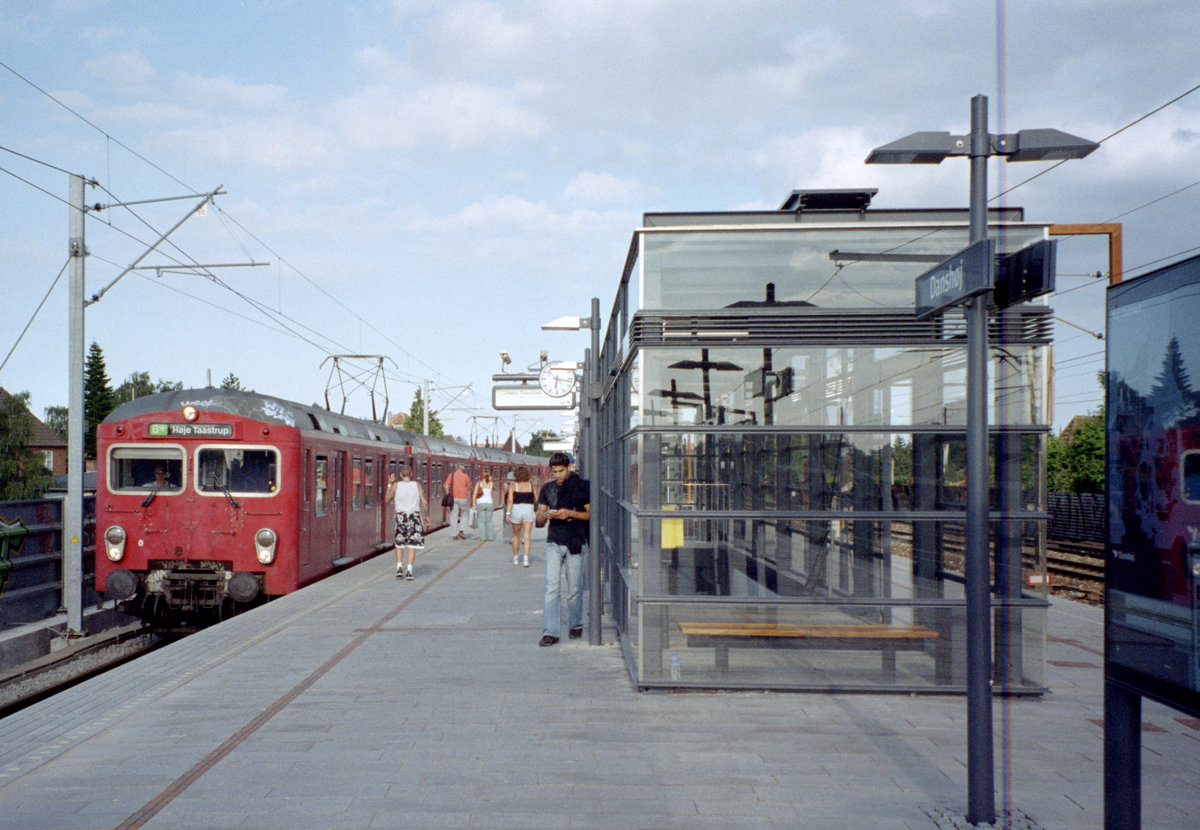
2nd generation S-train on line B+ in Danshøj in 2006.

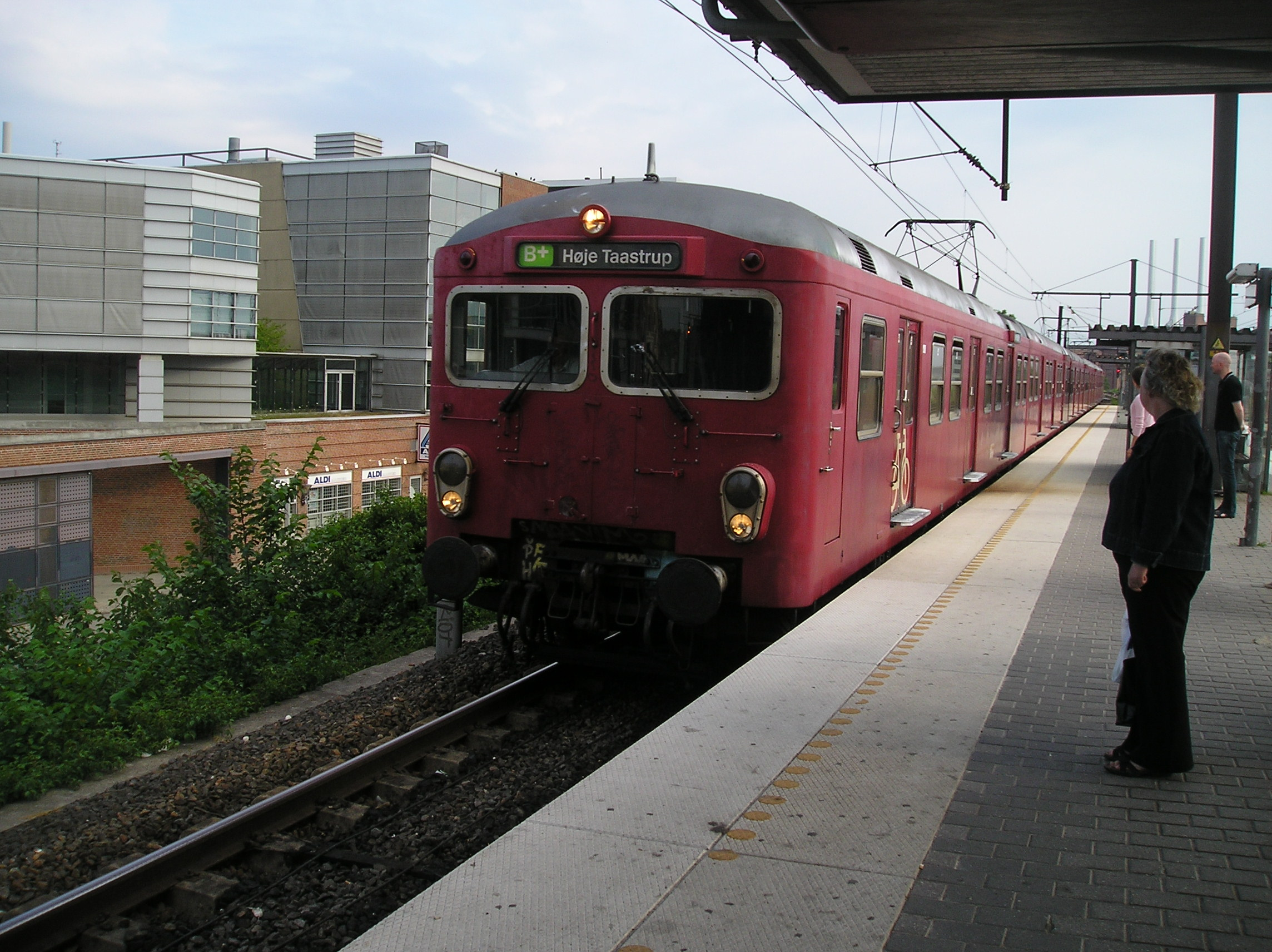
Line B+ at Nordhavn Station

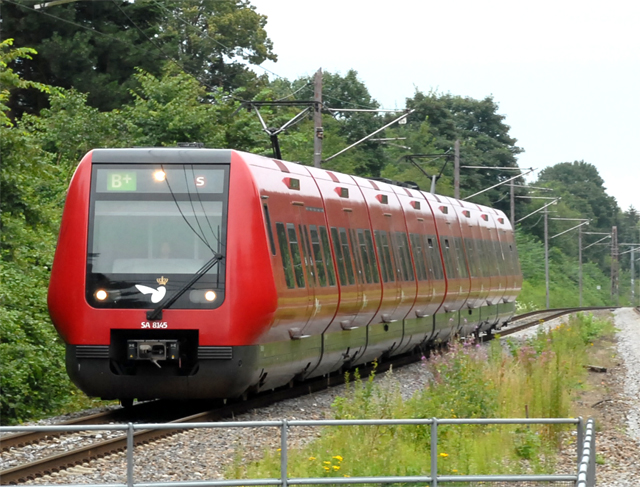
Line B+ at Jægersborg in 2007.

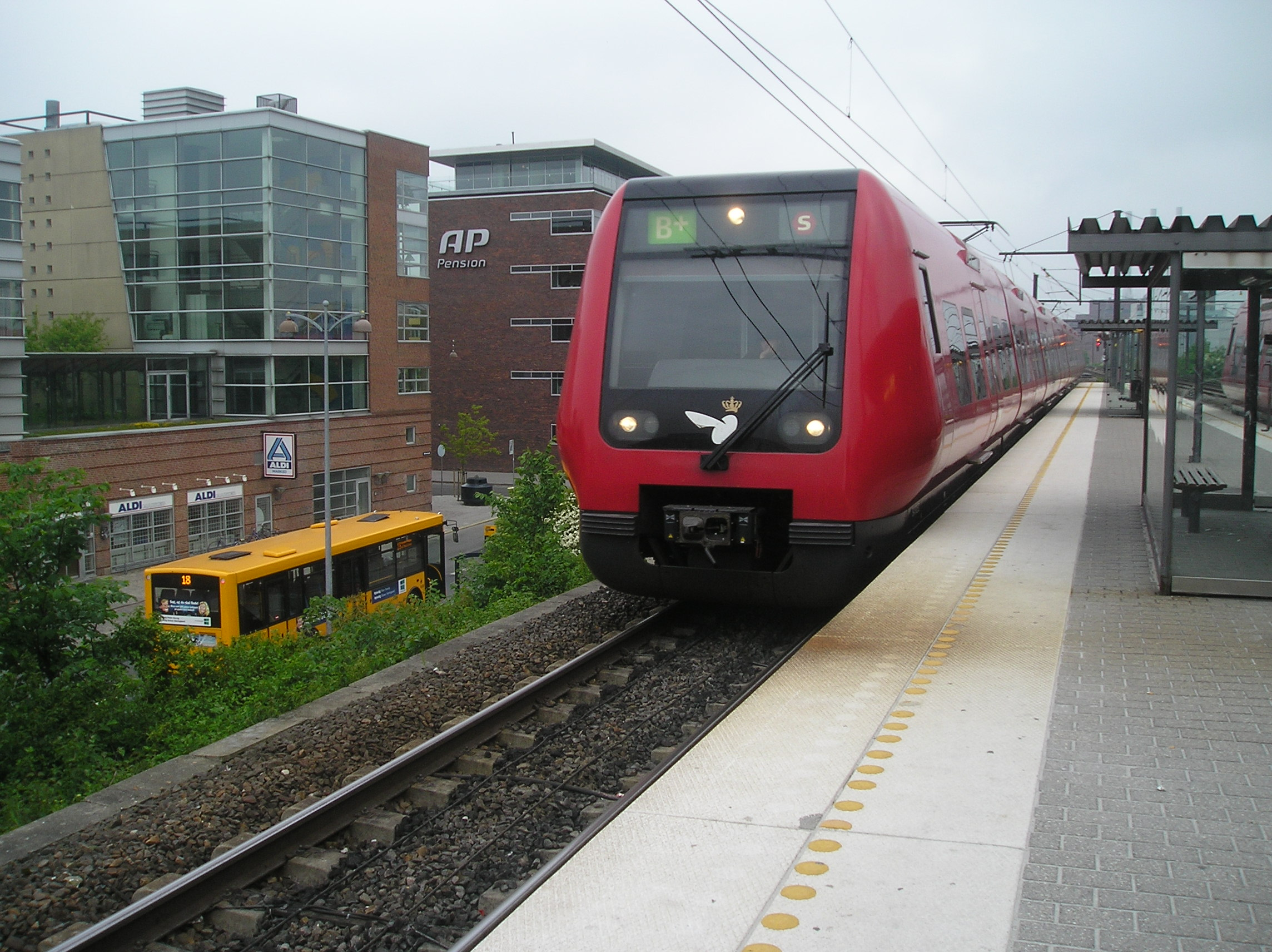
Line B+ at Nordhavn Station

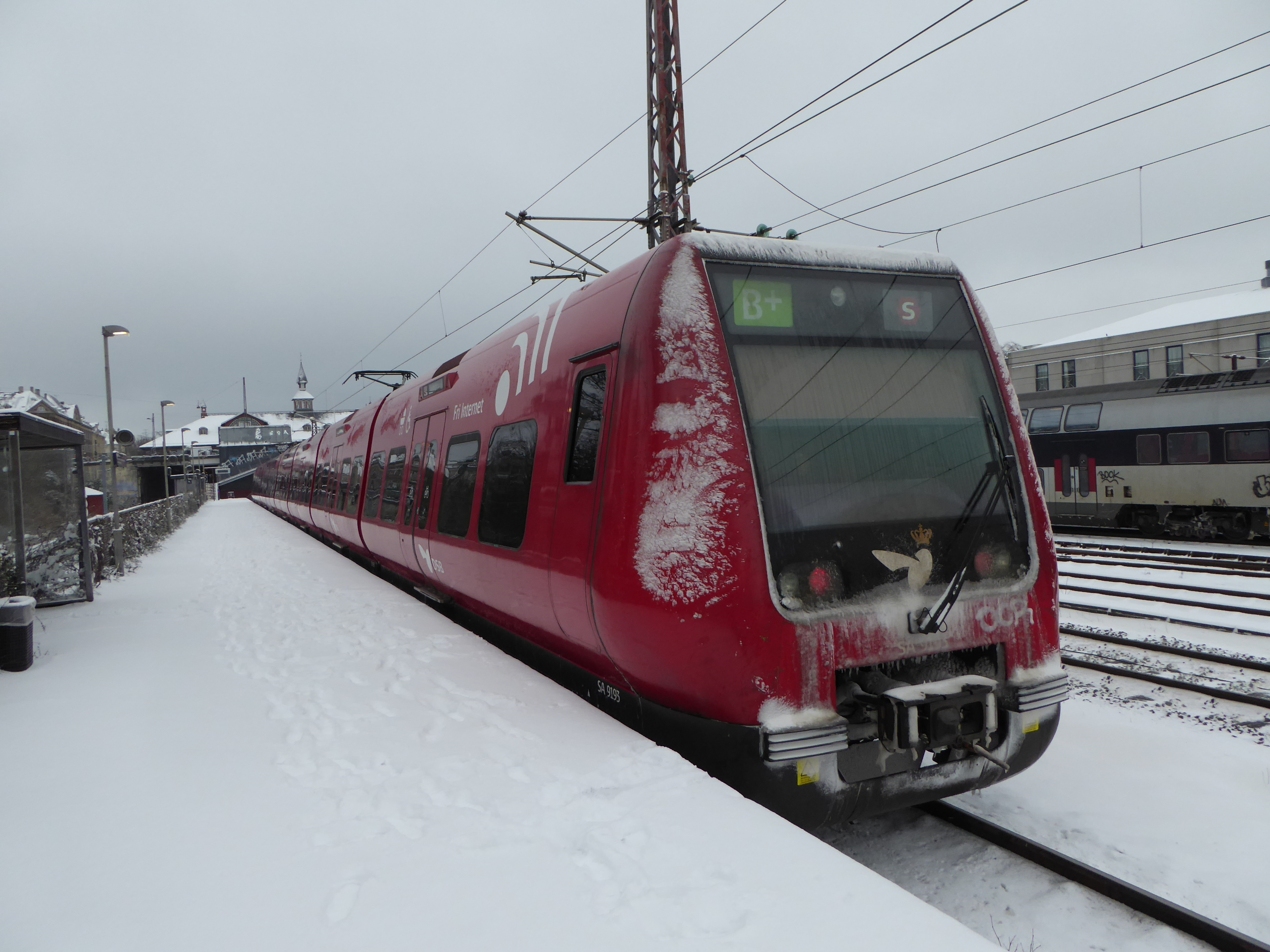
Line B+ at Østerport Station in 2007. Which was closed in 2007

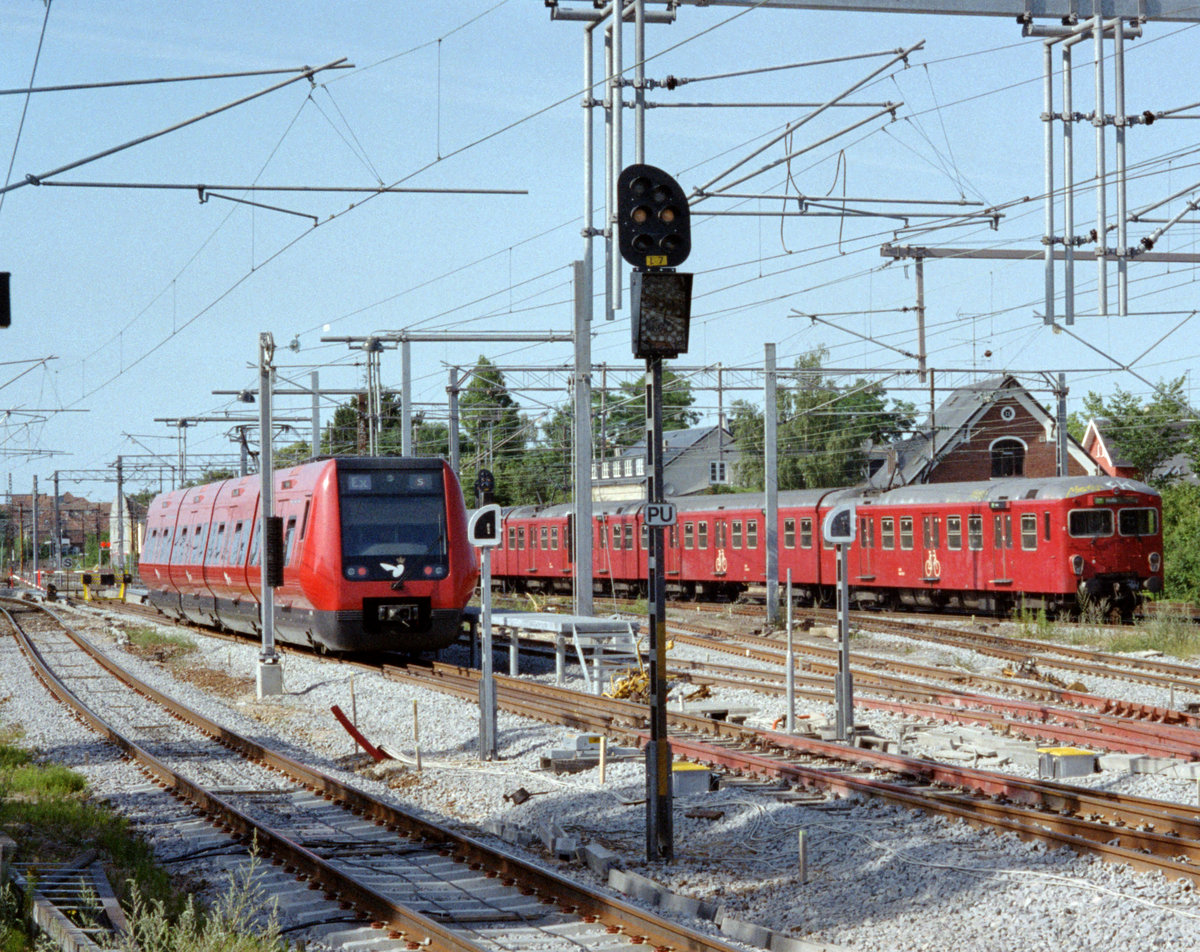
Line Ex and line B+ at Hellerup Station in 2006.

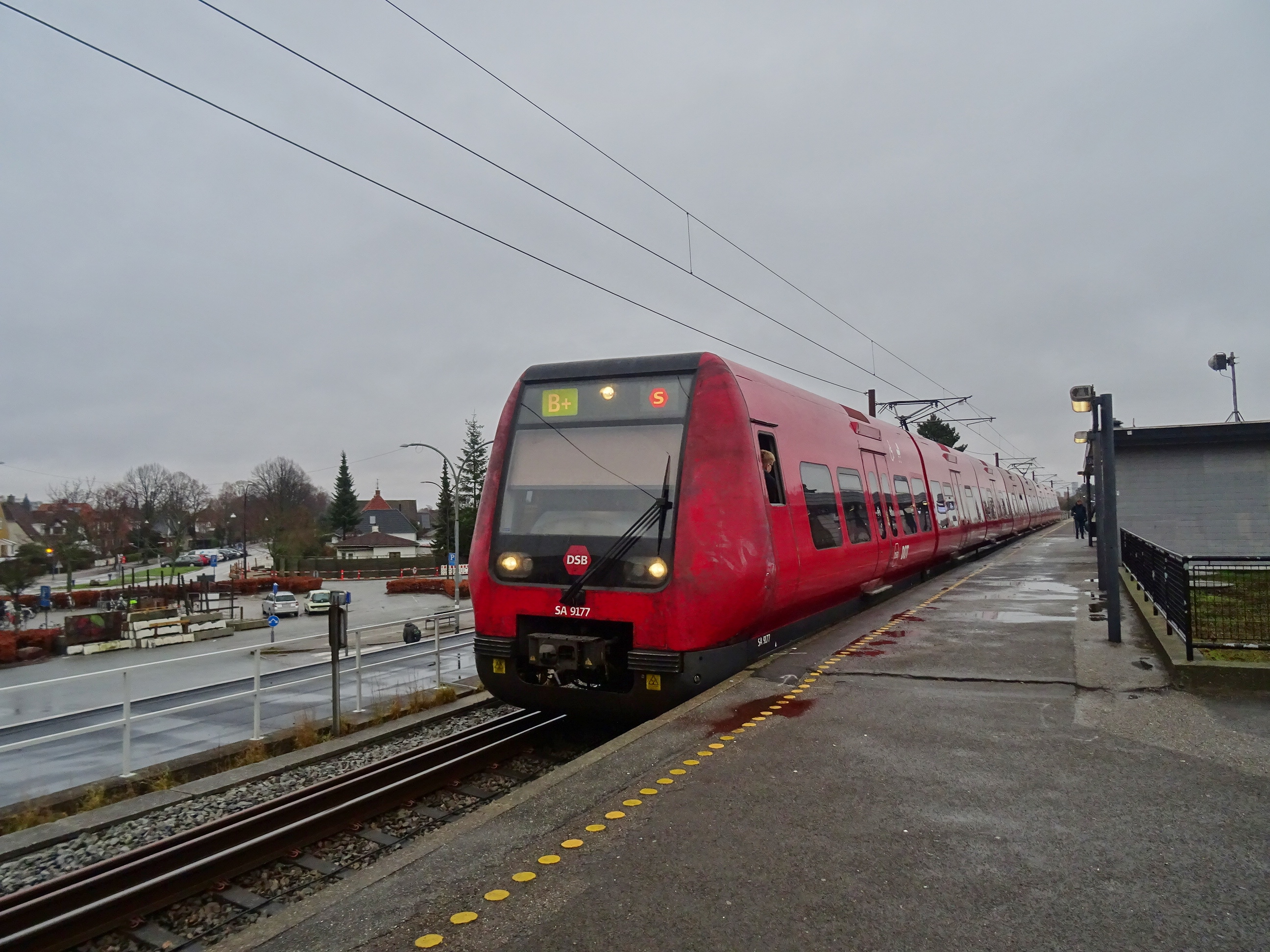
line B as B+ at Rødovre Station

=== Bx ===

Rush-hour supplements for B ran from 1955:

Name	Southern end	Years	Northern end
–	terminated at København H	1955–1963	Nordbanen: all stops to Lyngby
–	Vestbanen: all stops to Hvidovre	1960–1963	terminated at Hellerup
	to Taastrup, non-stop København H - Hvidovre	1963–1972	to Lyngby, non-stop Østerport - Bernstorffsvej
	to Taastrup, non-stop København H - Valby - Glostrup	1972–1979	to Lyngby, non-stop Østerport - Bernstorffsvej
	to Taastrup, non-stop København H - Valby - Glostrup	1979–1986	Hareskovbanen: to Farum, non-stop Østerport - Kildebakke and Bagsværd - Værløse
	as above, extended to Høje Taastrup	1986–1989	Hareskovbanen: to Farum, non-stop Østerport - Kildebakke and Bagsværd - Værløse
	as above, plus all stops until Valby	1989–1993	as above, plus stop in Vangede
	to Høje Taastrup, non-stop København H - Valby	1993–1995	to Hellerup, non-stop from Østerport
	as above, except non-stop Valby - Glostrup	1995–2001	terminated at København H
	as above, except non-stop Valby - Glostrup	2001–2002	to Hellerup, non-stop from Østerport
	as above, except non-stop Valby - Glostrup	2002–2004	all stops to Hellerup
	to Høje Taastrup daytime Mon-Fri; non-stop Danshøj - Glostrup	2005	Klampenborgbanen: all stops to Klampenborg daytime Mon-Fri
No service in 2006 due to infrastructure works
	to Høje Taastrup rush hour Mon-Fri; non-stop Danshøj - Glostrup	2007-2009	Hareskovbanen: to Farum rush hour Mon-Fri; non-stop Ryparken - Vangede and in Skovbrynet
	as above, but only morning rush	Dec 2009–	terminates at Østerport

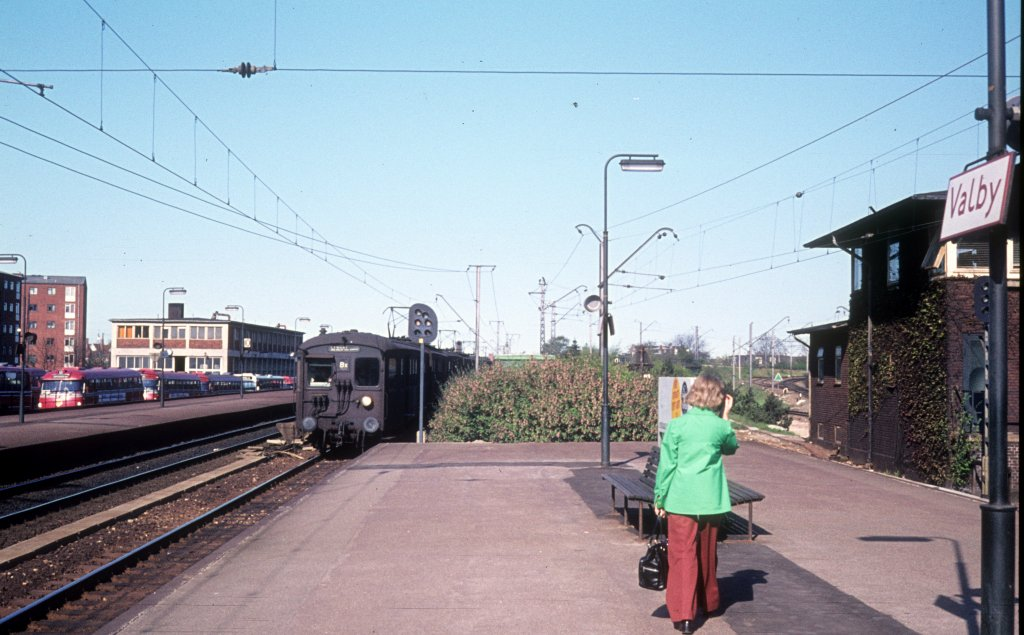
Bx at Valby Station.

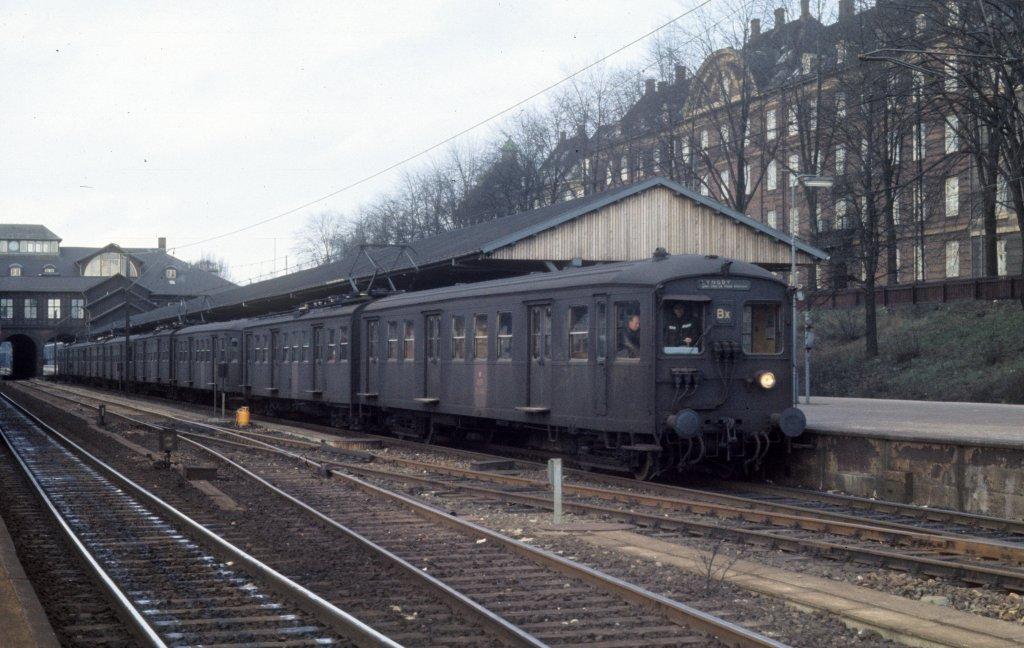
1st generation S-train on line Bx at Østerport Station in 1975.

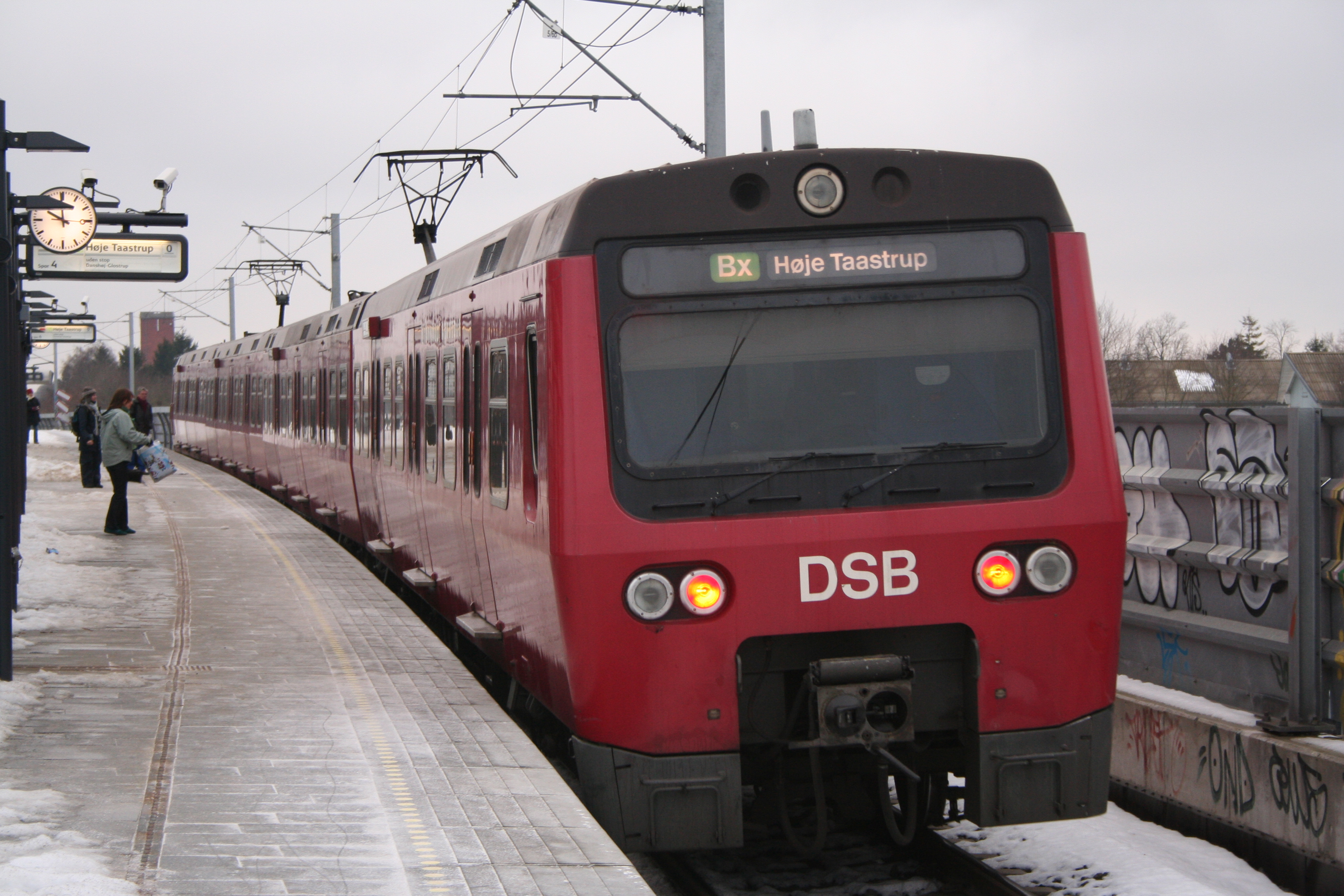
3rd generation S-train on line Bx at Danshøj Station in 2006.

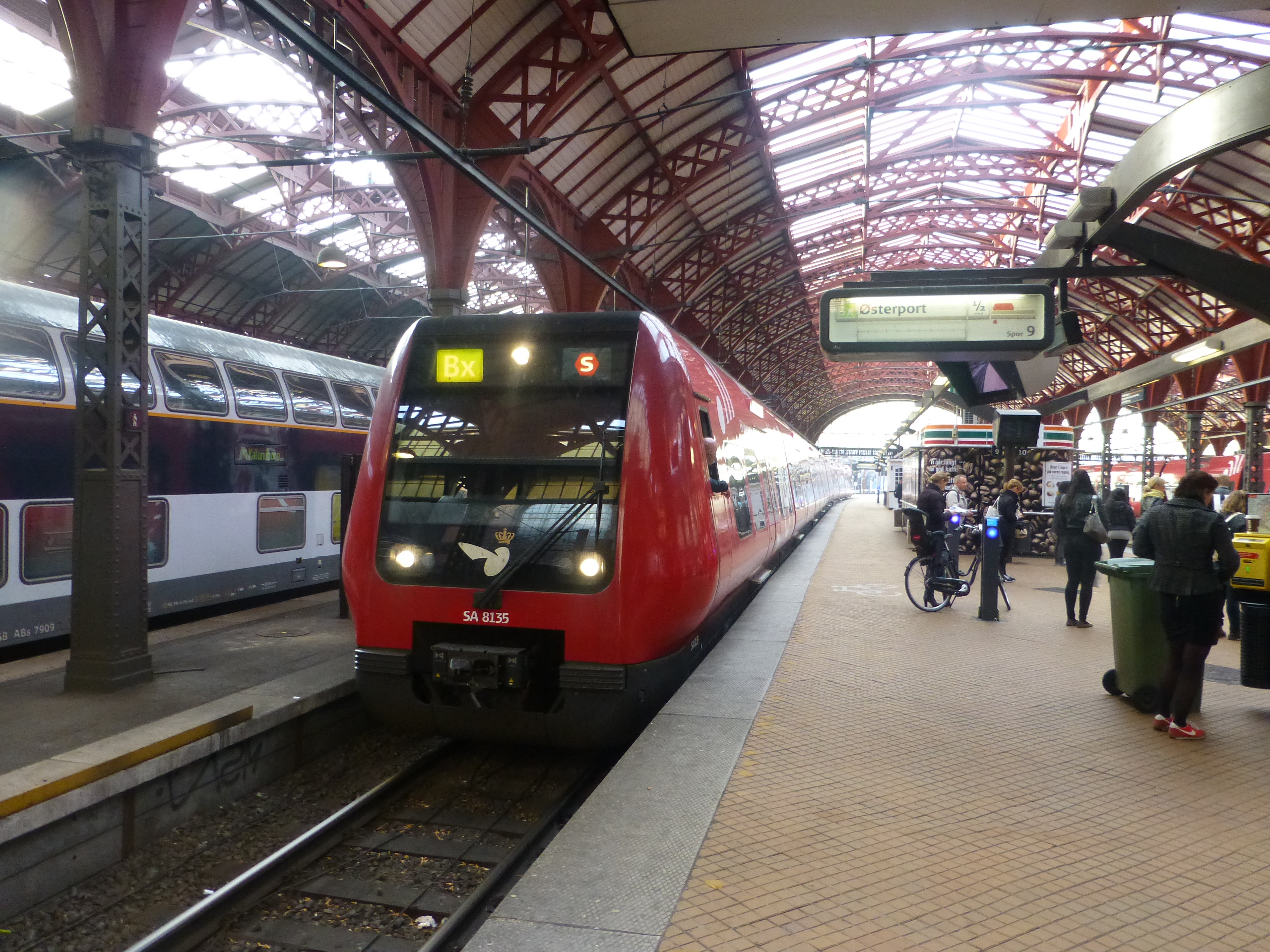
4th generation S-train litra SA at Copenhagen Central Station in 2013.

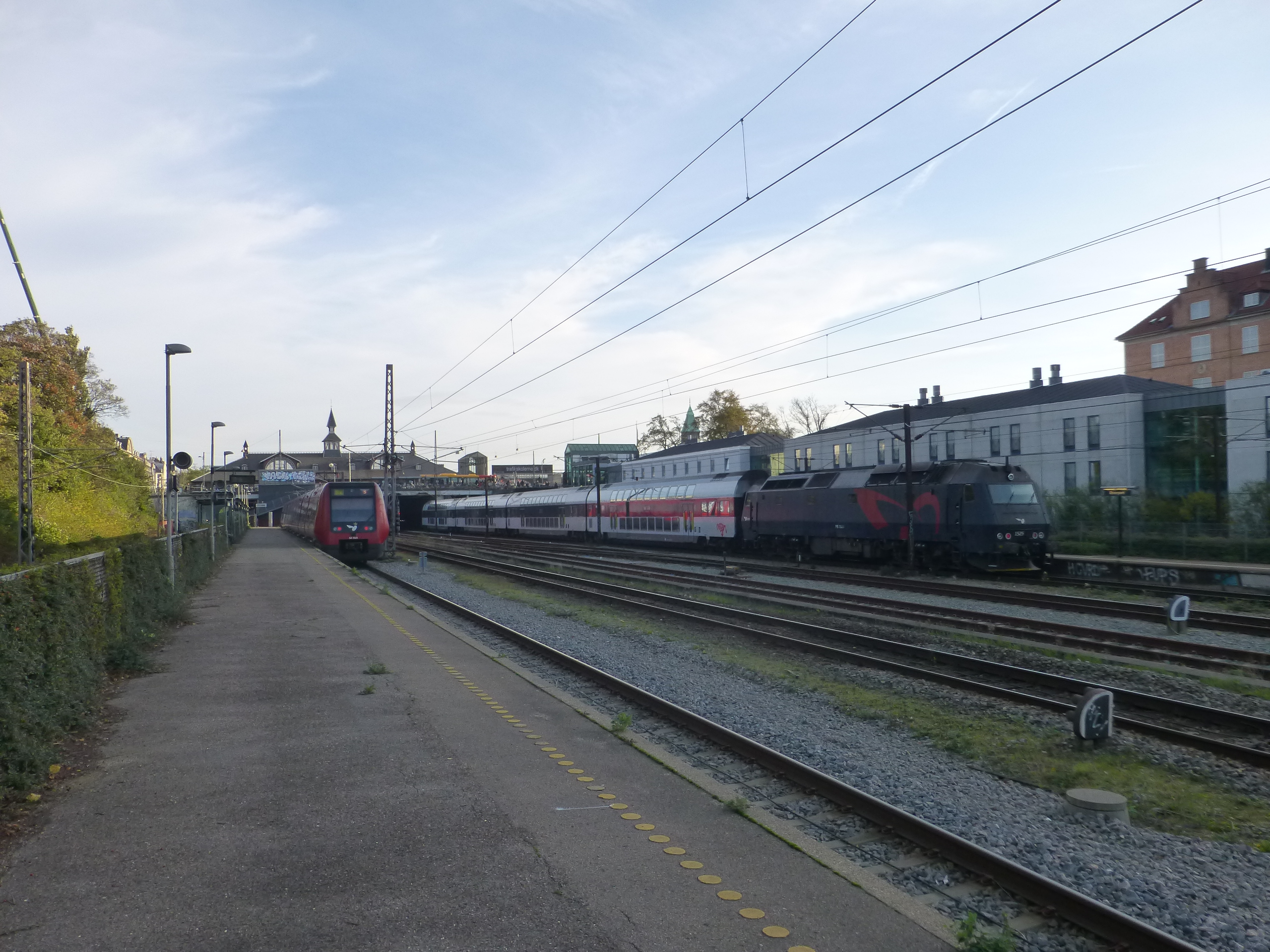
Line Bx at Østerport Station.
