= Buddinge railway station =

Commuter railway station in Greater Copenhagen, Denmark

Buddinge
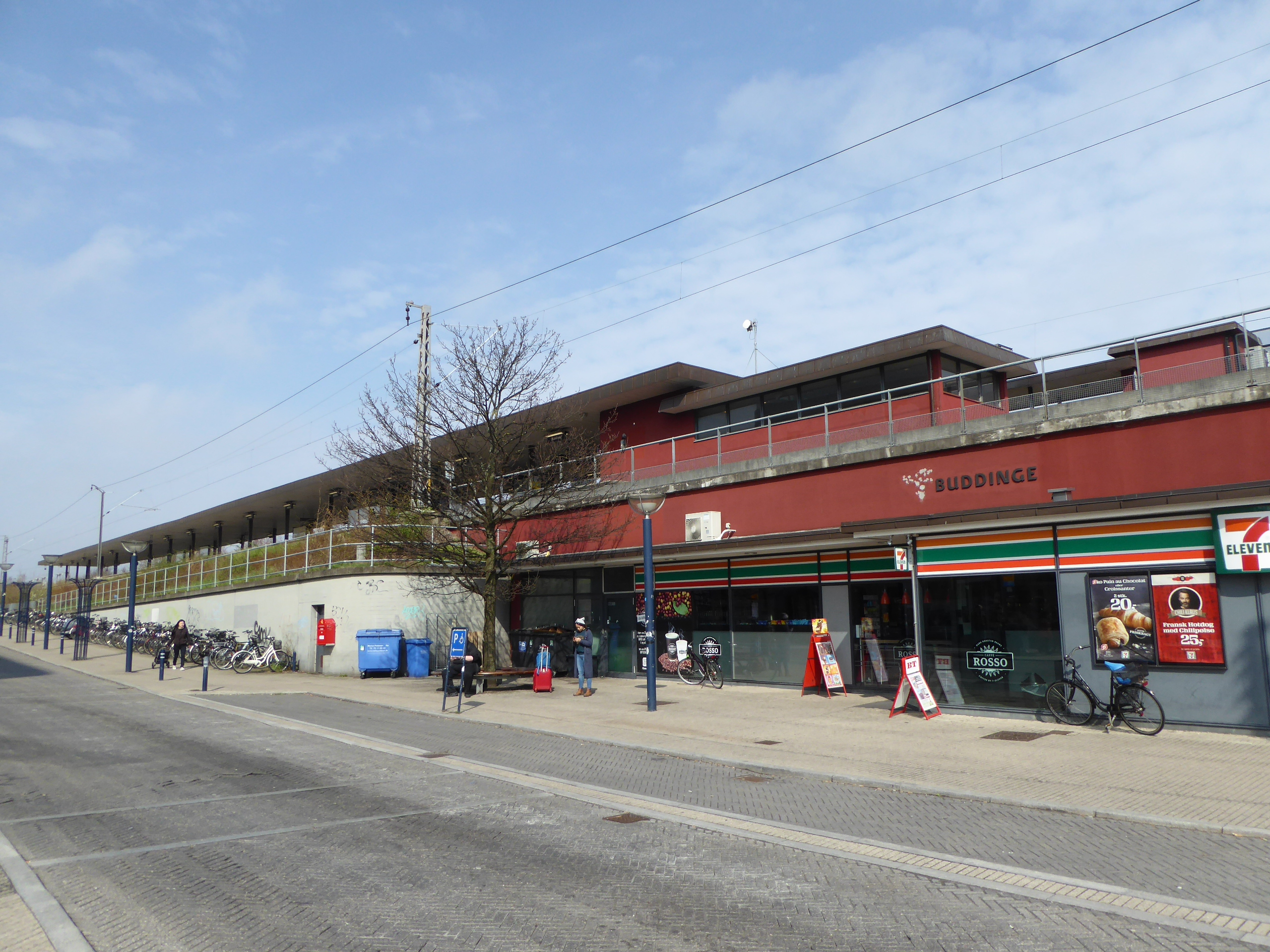
- Buddinge station in 2016

General information
- Location: 270 Buddingevej; 2860 Søborg; Gladsaxe Municipality; Denmark
- Coordinates: 55°44′50″N 12°29′36″E
- Elevation: 34.6 metres (114 ft)
- Owner: DSB (station infrastructure); Banedanmark (rail infrastructure)
- Line: Hareskov Line
- Platforms: Island platform
- Tracks: 2
- Train operators: DSB

History
- Opened: 1906

Services
Preceding station	S-train	Following station
Stengården towards Farum	B	Kildebakke towards Høje Taastrup
Terminus	Bx Peak hours	Kildebakke towards Høje Taastrup
Future services (2026)
Preceding station	Hovedstadens Letbane	Following station
Gladsaxe Rådhus towards Ishøj	Greater Copenhagen Light Rail	Gammelmosevej towards Lundtofte
Location

Buddinge station is a suburban rail railway station serving the suburb of Buddinge northwest of Copenhagen, Denmark. The station is located on the Farum radial of Copenhagen's S-train network.

== See also ==
- List of Copenhagen S-train stations
- List of railway stations in Denmark
