= Vigerslev train crash =

1919 railway accident in Denmark

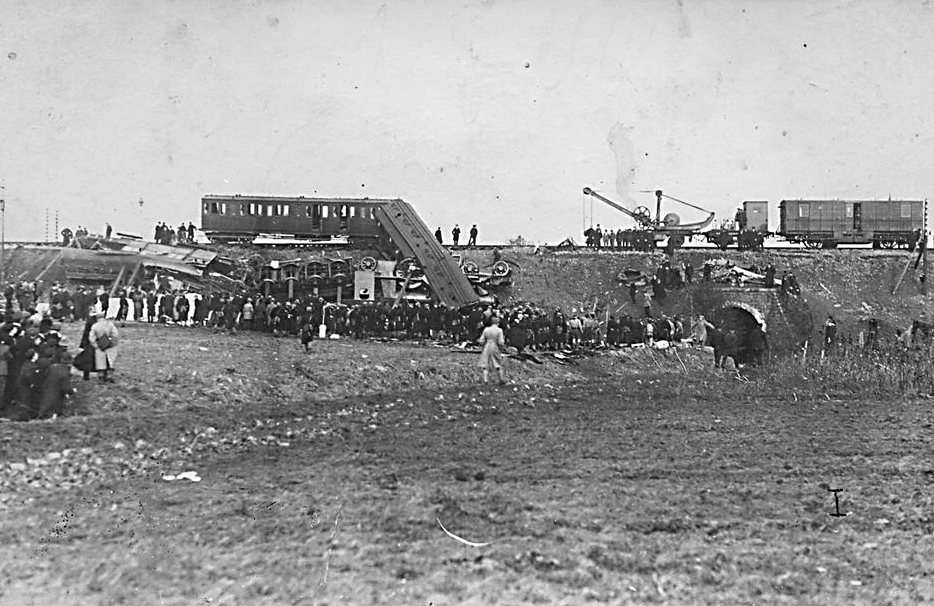
- A picture of the accident

Details
- Date: 1 November 1919
- Location: Vigerslev
- Coordinates: 55°39′51″N 12°28′39″E
- Country: Denmark
- Incident type: Collision
- Cause: Signal passed at danger

Statistics
- Trains: 2
- Deaths: 40
- Injured: about 60

The Vigerslev train crash occurred on 1 November 1919, when an express train collided at speed with a stopped train near Vigerslev, Denmark, due to a dispatcher error. 40 people were killed and about 60 injured.

== Background ==
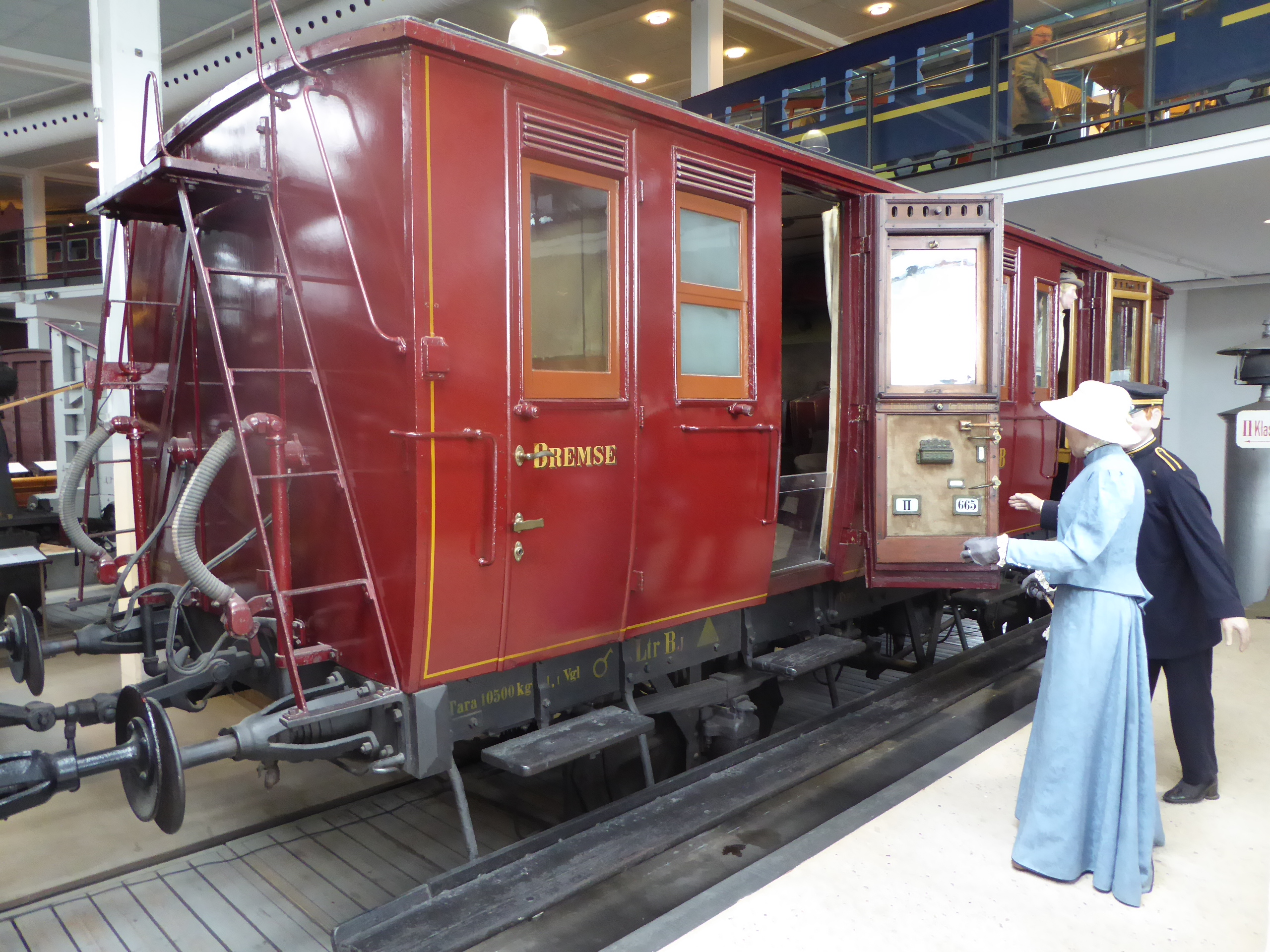
Salon-composite coach Bj 665 from the firefighting train, which narrowly avoided being involved in the accident, now preserved in the Danish Railway Museum. It is typical of the two-axle wooden coaches that also made up Train 168.

Vigerslev is nowadays a part of Copenhagen's western Valby district. Vigerslev train station is nowadays the Hvidovre station of the B-line of Copenhagen's S-tog network. The accident happened to the west of Vigerslev station, between current Rødovre station and Hvidovre station. At the time, the area around the track was farm land.

Train number 168 en route from Kalundborg to Copenhagen Central Station was delayed by about 15 minutes due to the heavy traffic on the line. The train consisted of 15 wagons pulled by DSB Litra K 150. It was initially made of two baggage cars, a mail carriage, four two-axle 3rd class compartment coaches, a four-axle 1st class compartment coach, a four-axle 2nd class compartment coach and another two-axle 3rd class compartment coach. At Holbæk, four additional coaches were added at the rear-end (another two-axle 3rd class compartment coach, an old two-axle first class compartment coach, a two-axle third class compartment coach fitted with a heating boiler and a brake compartment and an open-plan 3rd class coach). The last wagon was a well occupied 3rd class passenger car. Most of the carriages were between 17 and 56 years old and only two (the 2nd class coach and the tail-end 3rd class coach) were less than 10 years old. All of them were made out of wood with steel frames.

Train 168 was followed by an unscheduled train that carried firefighting equipment to Køge, where it was urgently required to fight a large fire. It was composed of four goods wagons and salon-composite coach Bj 665 pulled by DSB Litra KS 276.

This train on its part was followed an extra express train service, train 8064, on its way from Korsør to Copenhagen Central Station. Pulling it was a high speed DSB Class P steam locomotive that could reach 120 kilometres per hour (75 mph). The wagons after the locomotive were a two-axle mail carriage, a four-axle baggage car, two four axle 1st class compartment cars and seven of four-axle 3rd class corridor coaches.

== Accident ==
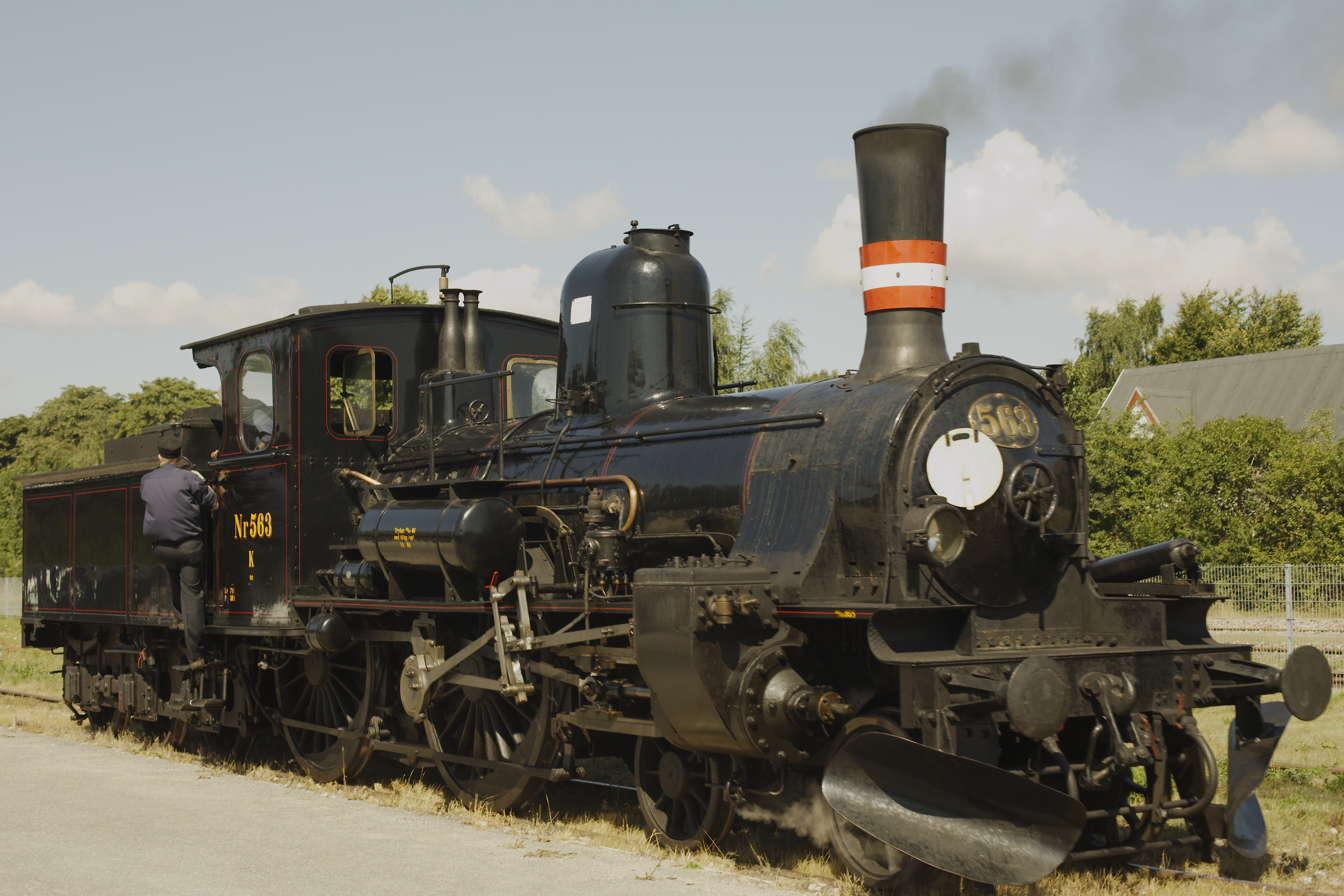
a DSB Class K like this one was hauling train 168

Against the timetable, train 168 stopped just after passing Vigerslev station. It was almost 20:50. It later turned out that an 8-year-old boy opened one of the outer doors of the train and fell out. Another passenger pulled the emergency brake in response to that. The train now had to drive back to search for the boy.

However, the train dispatcher decided that the train carrying the fire fighting equipment had priority and signalled that the track was free to this train. Train 168 had to wait at the Vigerslev station, the engineer of train 168 was told to look for the boy as soon as the other train had passed. After the train passed, train 168 reversed in the direction of Brøndbyøster station, passing the entry signal from behind. The train dispatcher had only thought about the train carrying the firefighting equipment, and gave train 168 a free path to Brondbyøster. Shortly after he noticed that he didn't think about the express train, and he tried to contact Brøndbyøster station. This was unsuccessful however, as his colleague at Brondbyøster was busy with the throughcoming express train. After the dispatcher at Vigerslev managed to have phone contact with the Brondbyøster dispatcher and made him aware of the danger, he grabbed a red signalling lantern, ran toward the engineer of train 168 and commanded him to reverse. The engineer followed his command, but the steam locomotive accelerated only slowly.

Train 168 had only travelled 130 metres (430 ft) from the entry signal at Vigerslev towards the direction of Brondbyøster. The boy who fell off the train had been found next to the track, he had survived with a broken leg. Meanwhile, the dispatcher ran towards Brondbyøster to signal the express train to stop with his lantern. The express train, however, was already nearing rapidly.

Although the red entry signals, the red tail signals of train 168 and the dispatcher's lantern were visible to the engineer of the express train, the train didn't brake, as passengers in the train would later testify.

On 21:01 the express train crashed into train 168 at full speed. The last five carriages of train 168 were completely smashed, 30 passengers died in these. Parts of the carriages crashed down an 8 metres (26 ft) high embankment. The express train's locomotive and its three front wagons came to a stop on the remains of train 168's carriages. 6 passengers of the express train died, as well as the engineer and the fireman, who died on the site, badly burned by the boiling water escaping from the locomotive's boiler.

== Aftermath ==
In total 40 people died, 58 were injured of which 27 badly. It was the worst railway accident in Denmark in number of victims. The damage to equipment was 1.2 million Danish krone. As the accident took place away from a station, the site was not lit, which complicated the salvage operations. The only light source available were the front signals of the train carrying the fire fighting equipment, that travelled back to the site of the accident.

The dispatcher in Vigerslev was sentenced to two months jail time in 1920.

The express train locomotive was repaired, upgraded as a class Pr Pacific in 1943 then wrecked in another accident in 1951 when it collided head-on with a DSB Litra R locomotive. One of the driving wheel axles of the locomotive is on display at the Forstadsmuseet in Brøndbyøster.

Eight carriages in both trains were badly damaged or totally destroyed. Two of them were repaired for other purposes and one of them wasn't scrapped until 2013, despite its coach body having been set aside for preservation in 1995.

Despite not directly involved in the collision, the Salon coach Bj 665, preserved in the Danish Railway Museum, saw some role in Vigerslev train crash: it was the tail-end carriage of the firefighting train running behind train 8064.
