= Enghave railway station =

Former commuter railway station in Copenhagen, Denmark

Enghave
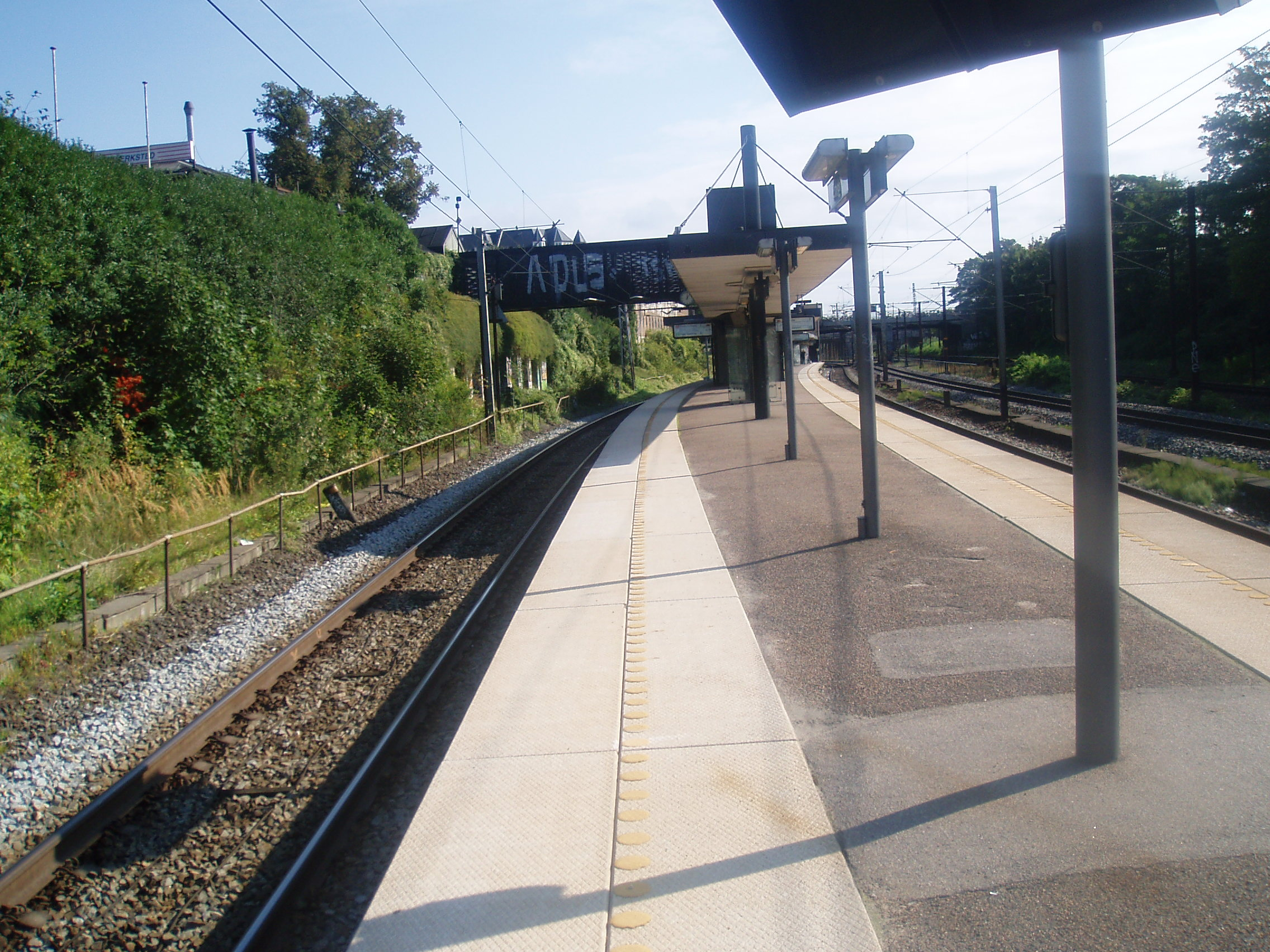

General information
- Location: Sønder Boulevard 137; 1720 Copenhagen V
- Coordinates: 55°39′47″N 12°32′24″E
- Elevation: 6.6 metres (22 ft)
- System: S-train station
- Owner: DSB
- Platforms: Island platform
- Tracks: 2

History
- Opened: 11 November 1911 (Mainline) 1 November 1934 (S-train)
- Closed: 1941 (Mainline), 2016 (S-train)
- Electrified: 1934

Former services
Preceding station	S-train	Following station
Valby towards Østerport	H	Dybbølsbro towards Ballerup
Valby towards Klampenborg	C	Dybbølsbro towards Frederikssund
Valby towards Buddinge	Bx	Dybbølsbro towards Høje Taastrup
Valby towards Farum	B	Dybbølsbro towards Høje Taastrup
Location

Enghave station is a former station on the S-train network in Copenhagen, Denmark. The station opened on 11 November 1911. S-train service commenced on 1 November 1934 and was latterly served by trains on Vestbanen and Frederikssundbanen.

Until 1923, the station was called Vester Fælledvej.

The station closed on 3 July 2016, when it was replaced with a new station 200 metres farther west, named Carlsberg station, which connects to the new residential area being built in the Carlsberg neighbourhood.

== Cultural references ==
Enghave station is seen at 1:19:02 in the 1975 Olsen-banden film The Olsen Gang on the Track.
