= Brøndby (disambiguation) =

Brøndby may refer to:

- Brøndby, a Danish municipality in Region Hovedstaden
  - Brøndbyvester, a civil parish and the municipal seat of Brøndby
  - Brøndbyøster, a civil parish of Brøndby
  - Brøndby Strand, a civil parish of Brøndby
- Brøndby IF, a Danish football club of Brøndby
