= Carlsberg railway station =

Commuter railway station in Copenhagen, Denmark

Carlsberg
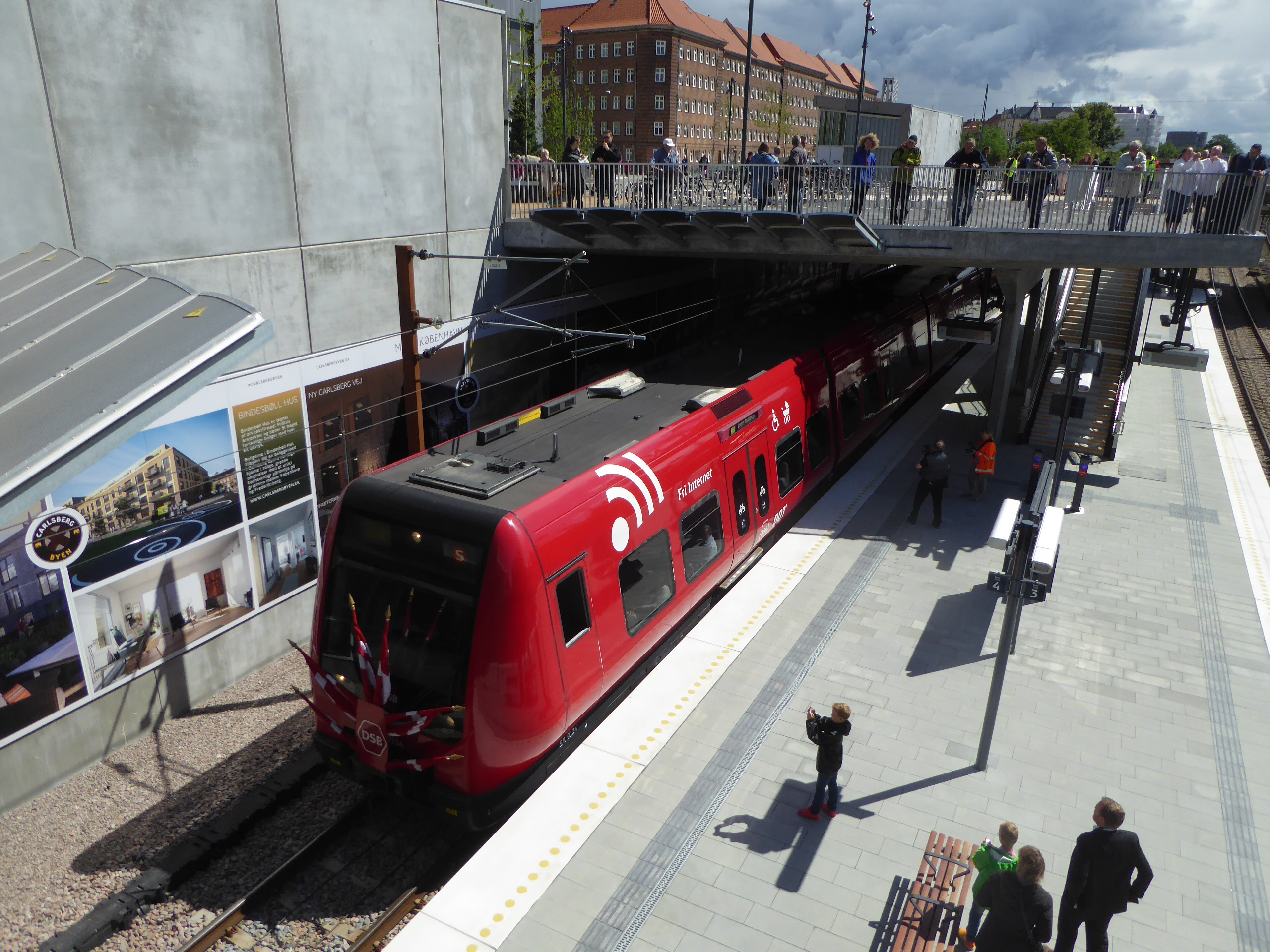
- Carlsberg station on the opening day, 3 July 2016

General information
- Location: Tapperitorvet 3; 1799 Copenhagen V Copenhagen Municipality; Denmark
- Coordinates: 55°39′50″N 12°32′10″E
- Elevation: 2.8 metres (9 ft 2 in)
- Owner: DSB (station infrastructure); Banedanmark (rail infrastructure)
- Operator: DSB
- Platforms: 1 island platform
- Tracks: 2 S-train, 2 non-stop mainline
- Train operators: DSB
- Bus routes: 1A, 9A, 11

Construction
- Structure type: Below grade

Other information
- Station code: Cb
- Fare zone: 1
- Website: Official website

History
- Opened: 3 July 2016; 10 years ago

Services
Preceding station	S-train	Following station
Dybbølsbro towards Farum	B	Valby towards Høje Taastrup
Dybbølsbro towards Buddinge	Bx Peak hours	Valby towards Høje Taastrup
Dybbølsbro towards Klampenborg	C	Valby towards Frederikssund
Dybbølsbro towards Østerport	H Mon–Fri	Valby towards Ballerup
Location

Carlsberg station (Danish pronunciation: [ˈkʰɑˀlsˌpɛɐ̯ˀ stæˈɕoˀn]) is an S-train station in Copenhagen, Denmark, that serves the Carlsberg area of the Vesterbro/Kongens Enghave district. Situated on the Høje Taastrup radial of the S-train network, it opened on 3 July 2016 and replaced Enghave station, which was located 200m east.

== History ==
The station was designed by Gottlieb Paludan Architects and constructed for the Carlsberg Byen development company between 2014 and 2016, before being handed over to Banedanmark and DSB for operation. It serves the new residential and retail developments on the former Carlsberg brewery site, as well as the adjacent University College Capital campus; it is expected to become one of the five busiest S-train stations in Copenhagen, with approximately 24,000 travellers per day. It is located on the site of the brewery's freight depot, Station Høje, which was in operation from 1937 until 1985.

== See also ==
- List of Copenhagen S-train stations
- List of railway stations in Denmark
