= Hvidovre railway station =

Commuter railway station in Greater Copenhagen, Denmark

Hvidovre
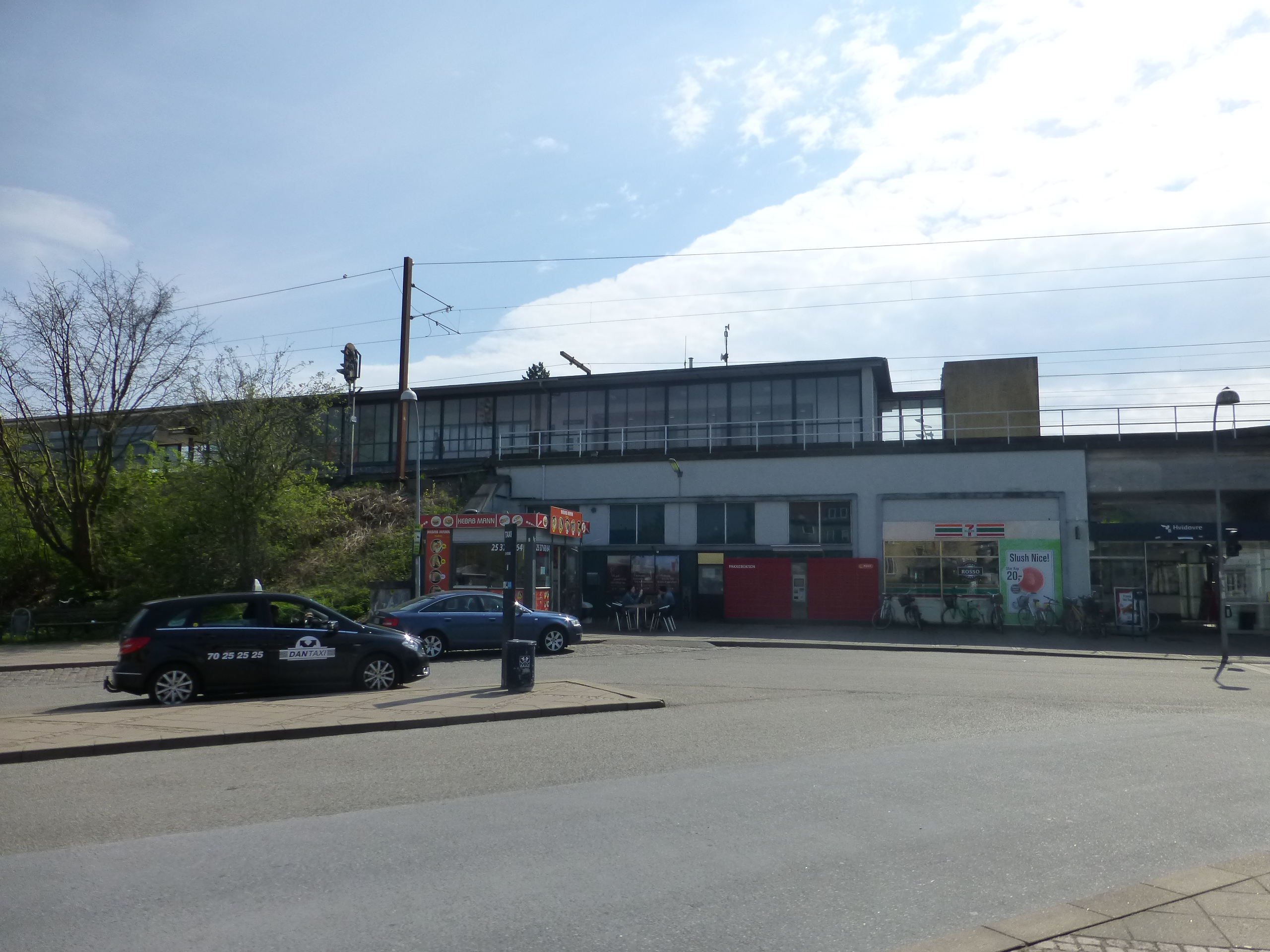
- Hvidovre station in 2014

General information
- Location: Hvidovrevej 53-57; 2650 Hvidovre; Hvidovre Municipality; Denmark
- Coordinates: 55°39′52″N 12°28′26″E
- Elevation: 11.8 metres (39 ft)
- Owner: DSB (station infrastructure); Banedanmark (rail infrastructure)
- Platforms: Island platform
- Tracks: 2 + bypass
- Train operators: DSB

Construction
- Architect: Knud Tanggaard Seest (1953)

History
- Opened: 1935
- Rebuilt: 17 June 1953 (S-train)
- Electrified: 1953 (S-train)

Services
Preceding station	S-train	Following station
Danshøj towards Farum	B	Rødovre towards Høje Taastrup
Location

Hvidovre station is a railway station on the Taastrup radial of the S-train network in Copenhagen, Denmark. It is located about 1 km north of the old village of Hvidovre, in the far northwestern corner of Hvidovre Municipality. The station thus also serves areas in the neighbouring Rødovre and Copenhagen municipalities, whereas the larger part of Hvidovre municipality is actually better served by stations on the Køge radial.

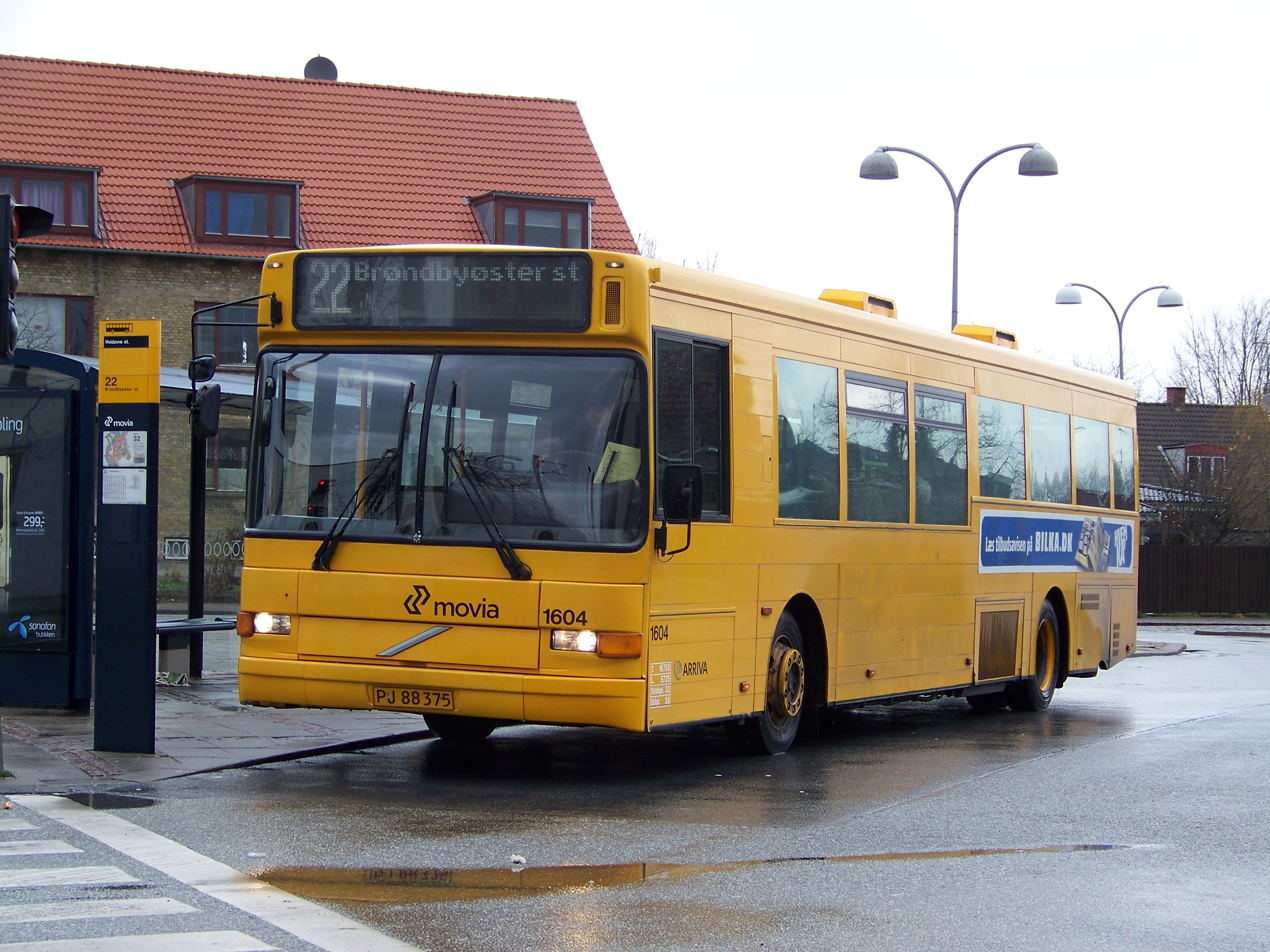
Arriva Volvo bus waiting at Hvidovre station on Movia route 22 toward Brøndbyøster station

== Cultural references ==
Hvidovre station is seen at 1:20:36 in the 1975 Olsen-banden film The Olsen Gang on the Track.

== See also ==
- List of Copenhagen S-train stations
- List of railway stations in Denmark
