= Danshøj railway station =

Commuter railway station in Copenhagen, Denmark

Danshøj
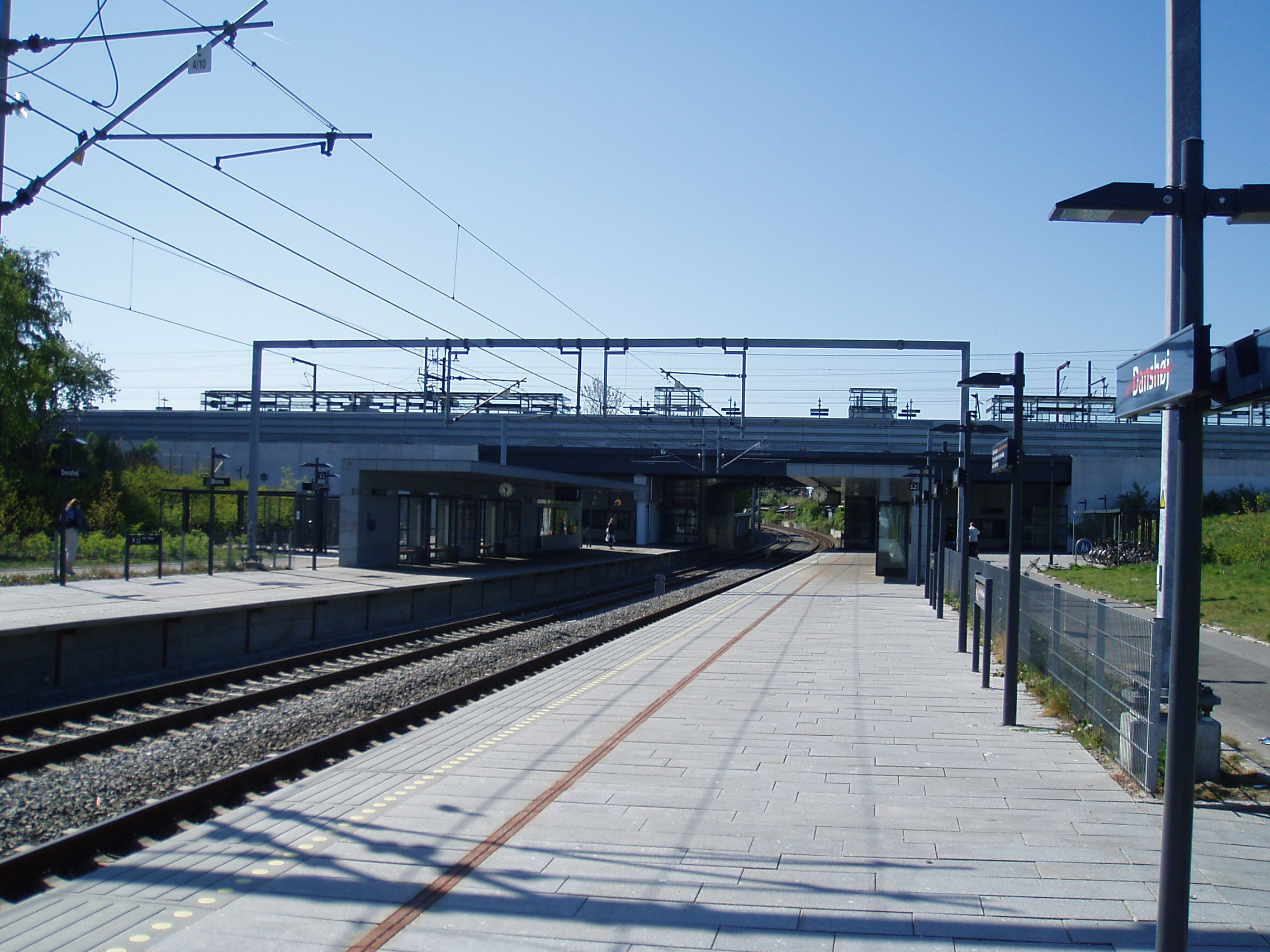
- Lower level side platforms

General information
- Location: Ansgars Allé 20; 2500 Valby; Copenhagen Municipality; Denmark
- Coordinates: 55°39′51″N 12°29′37″E
- Elevation: 13.3 metres (44 ft)
- Owner: DSB (station infrastructure); Banedanmark (rail infrastructure)
- Platforms: 3
- Tracks: 4
- Train operators: DSB

Construction
- Platform levels: 2

Other information
- Fare zone: 2

History
- Opened: 8 January 2005; 21 years ago

Services
Preceding station	S-train	Following station
Valby towards Farum	B	Hvidovre towards Høje Taastrup
Valby towards Buddinge	Bx Peak hours	Glostrup towards Høje Taastrup
Vigerslev Allé towards Copenhagen South	F	Ålholm towards Hellerup
Location

Danshøj station is an S-train junction between Vestbanen and Ringbanen in Copenhagen, Denmark. Opened on 8 January 2005, it serves mainly as an interchange station between B and F.

The station was in the project phase of Ringbanen originally intended to be known as Harrestrup. Due to public comments, however, the name was definitively changed to Danshøj.

== Overview ==
The station has two levels: F stops at the lower level with platforms to the sides of the track; B and Bx stop at the upper level with a platform between the track. The two levels are connected by stairways and lifts.

Intended as an interchange station between Vestbanen and Ringbanen, only pedestrians and bicycles can access the station, as automobiles, including buses, are denied entrance to the station area.

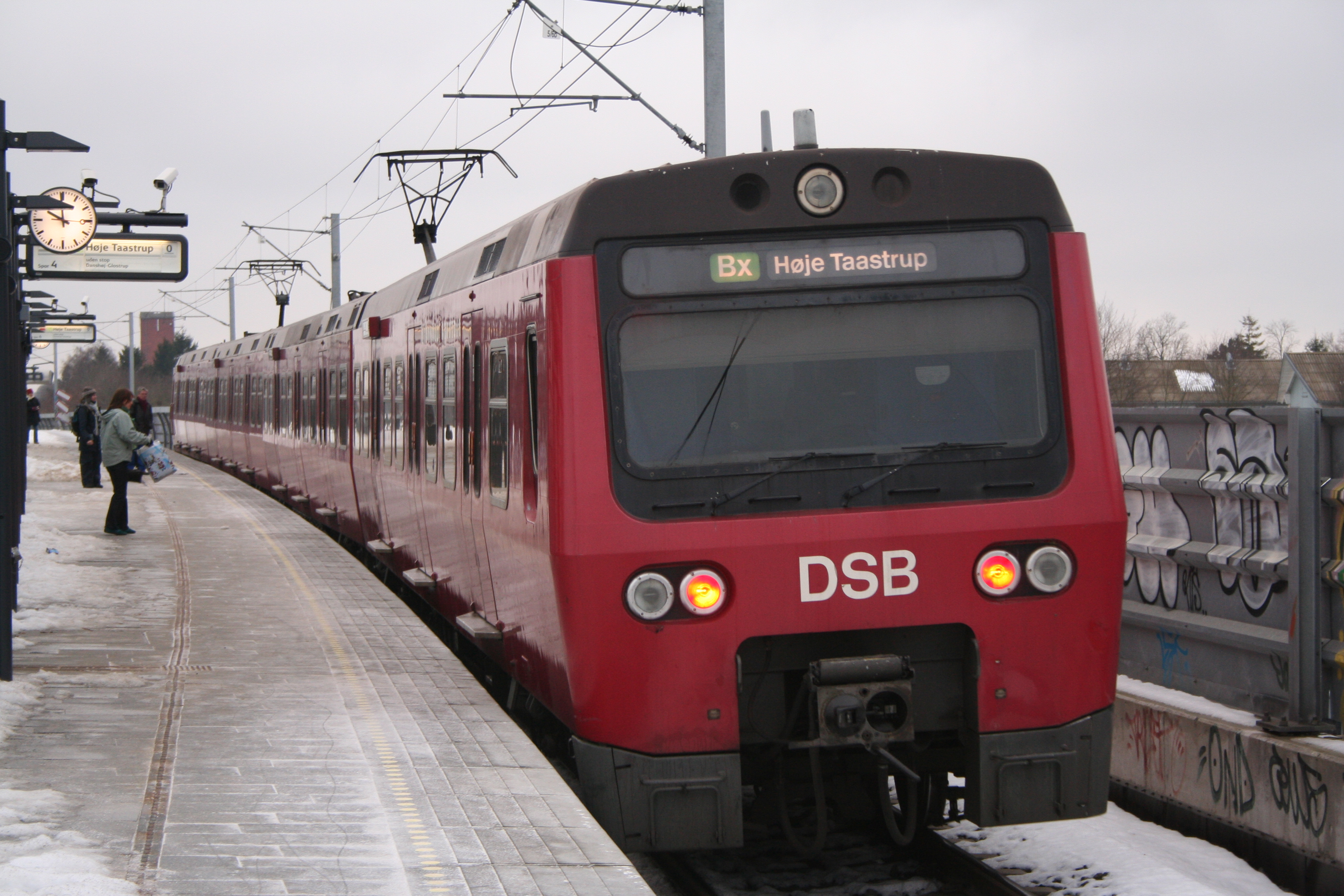
3rd generation S-train to Høje Taastrup at the upper level in 2006

== See also ==
- List of Copenhagen S-train stations
- List of railway stations in Denmark
