= Gottlieb Paludan Architects =

Danish architectural firm

Gottlieb Paludan Architects is a Danish architectural firm that provides consultancy services within infrastructure, construction and landscape architecture.

The firm was founded in Copenhagen in 1901 (125 years ago) and employed around 100 architects, constructing architects and other specialists as of 2015. In January 2018 it was acquired by the Swedish engineering and design consultancy ÅF (later renamed AFRY), which consolidated it into the ÅF Group with effect from 1 January 2018, when it had about 90 employees. In January 2026 it was integrated into AFRY's Nordic architecture brand, AFRY Architects.

== Selected projects ==
=== Completed ===
- Substation, Copenhagen Airport (1999)
- DR Byen – Segment 3 (2006)
- Peak-load plant KLC2, Copenhagen Airport (2006)
- Renovation of Copenhagen Central Station (2008)
- DSB Headquarters (2013)
- Funder Motorway Bridge (2012)
- Renovation of Nørreport Station (2015)
- Odense Foot and Cycle Bridge (2015)
- Carlsberg Station, Copenhagen (2016)

=== In progress ===
- BIO4 biomass unit, Copenhagen, Denmark
- Spot #40: Waste-to-energy, Shenzhen, China (competition win, February 2016)
