= List of Copenhagen S-train stations =

See also: List of Copenhagen S-train lines

Map of the Copenhagen S-train network

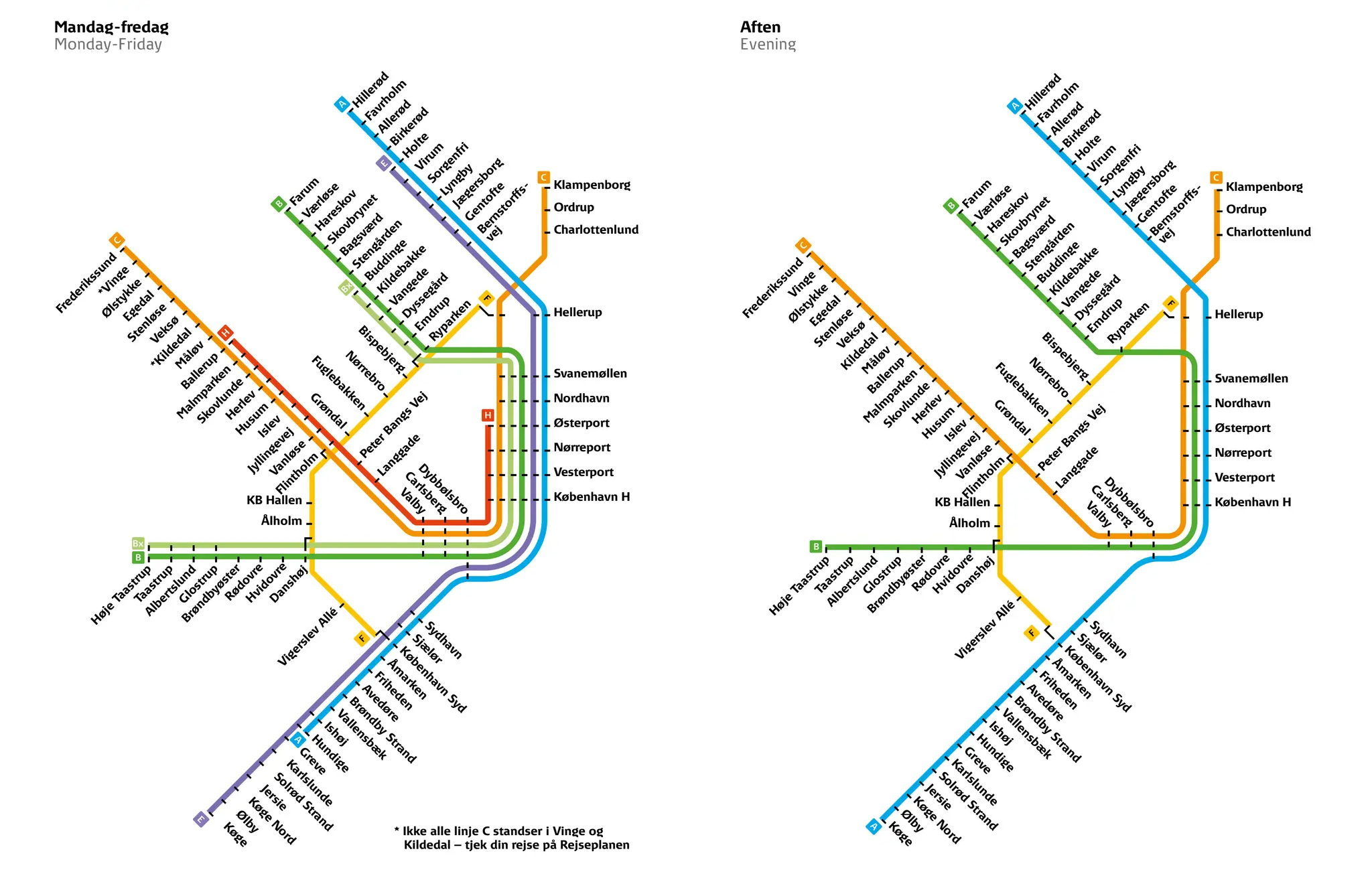
S-train system map

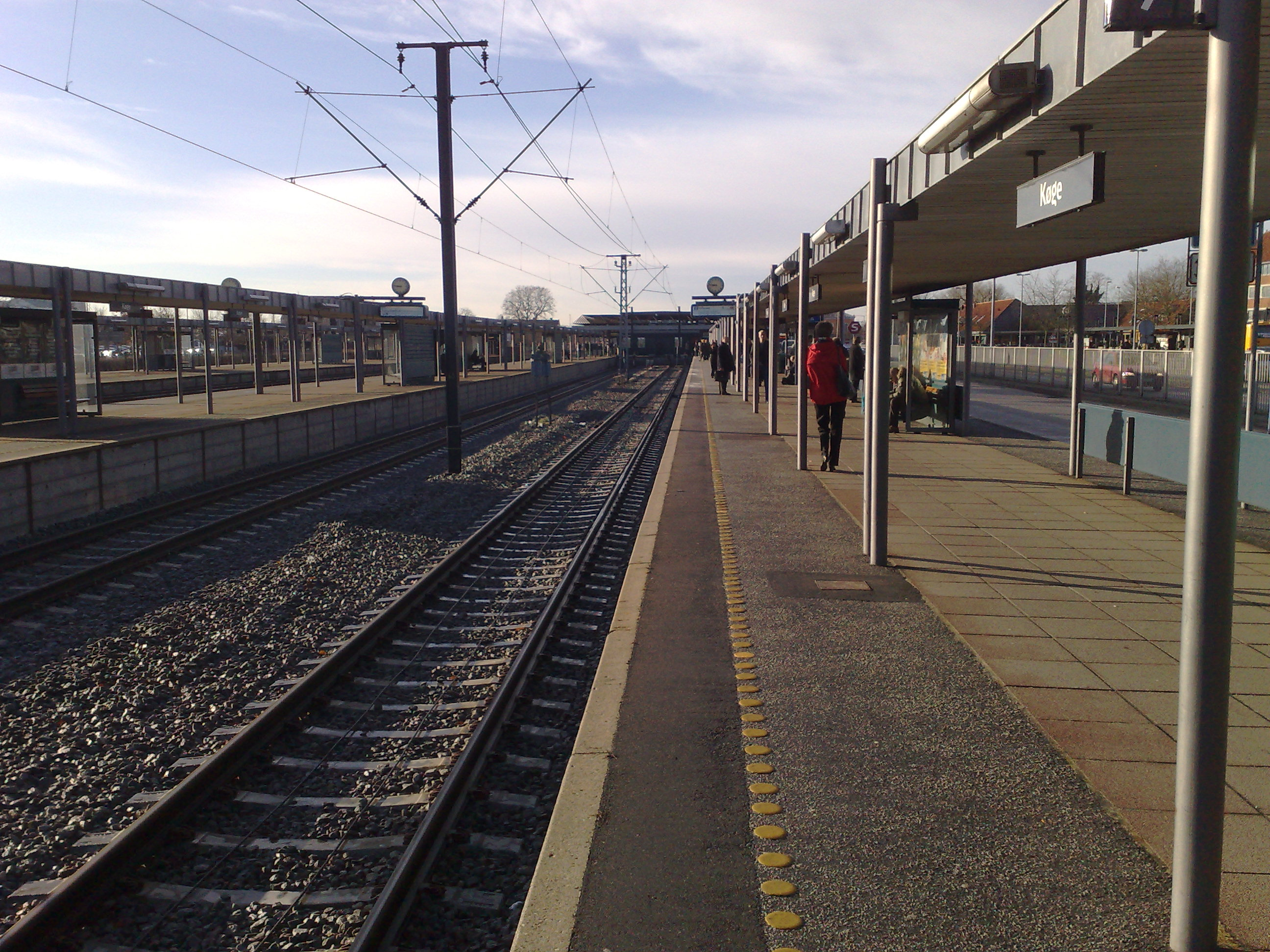
Terminus tracks of the S-train line E

There are 87 stations that are operated in normal operation on the Copenhagen S-train, an urban rail network which serves the Copenhagen metropolitan area in Denmark.

The stations are located on six suburban radial routes - A, B, Bx, C, E, H, and a ring line (F).

Forty-six are elevated, twenty-one are street level, fifteen are below street, four have different levels and one is underground. Of the 84 stations, are 32 located inside the four one-figured ticket fare zones, and another 35 stations are located within the Copenhagen Urban area.

17 stations can be said to be located in suburbs.

Lines E and H do not operate during weekends and nights. Line Bx is only operated in rush hour.

== Current stations ==
The table states the station's name, the lines which serve it, whether it is elevated or underground (the grade), fastest weekday morning travel time in minutes to Nørreport, the ticket zone and the transfer possibilities (if any) that are available at the station.

†	Terminal station
#	Transfer station

Station	Line	Grade	Opened	Time	Zone	Transfer
Albertslund	B (S-train) Bx (S-train)	Elevated	1963	21	43/54	—
Allerød	E (S-train)	Street level	1968	32	71/82	—
Avedøre	A (S-train)	Elevated	1972	19	33	—
Bagsværd	A (S-train) B (S-train) Bx (S-train)	Elevated	1977	23	1	—
Ballerup^{†#}	C (S-train) H (S-train)	Street level	1949	31	1, 3	—
Bernstorffsvej	B (S-train)	Elevated	1936	12	30	—
Birkerød	E (S-train)	Street level	1968	27	71	—
Bispebjerg	F (S-train)	Below street level	1996	17	2	—
Brøndby Strand	A (S-train)	Elevated	1972	21	44	—
Brøndbyøster	B (S-train)	Elevated	1953	18	1, 2	—
Buddinge	A (S-train) B (S-train) Bx (S-train)	Elevated	1977	19	1	Ring 3 light rail (2025)
Carlsberg^{#}	B (S-train) Bx (S-train) C (S-train) H (S-train)	Below street level	2016	?	3	—
Charlottenlund	C (S-train)	Street level	1934	13	4	—
Danshøj^{#}	B (S-train) Bx (S-train) F (S-train)	Elevated, street level	2005	13	1	—
Dybbølsbro^{#}	A (S-train) B (S-train) Bx (S-train) C (S-train) E (S-train) H (S-train)	Below street level	1934	6	1	—
Dyssegård	A (S-train)	Elevated	1977	14	2	—
Egedal	C (S-train) H (S-train)	Elevated	2002	40	4	—
Emdrup	A (S-train)	Below street level	1977	12	1	—
Farum^{†#}	A (S-train) B (S-train) Bx (S-train)	Street level	1977	33	3	—
Favrholm^{#}	A (S-train)	Street level	2023			Lokaltog, Regional
Flintholm^{#}	C (S-train) F (S-train) H (S-train)	Elevated, street level	2004	15		Copenhagen Metro
Frederikssund^{†#}	C (S-train) H (S-train)	Street level	1989	48	2	—
Friheden	A (S-train) E (S-train)	Elevated	1972	15	33	—
Fuglebakken	F (S-train)	Elevated	1936	20	3	—
Grøndal	F (S-train)	Below street level	1936	18	3	—
Gentofte^{#}	B (S-train)	Street level	1936	14	30/31/40/41	—
Glostrup^{#}	B (S-train) Bx (S-train)	Street level	1953	18	3	Ring 3 light rail (2025)
Greve	A (S-train) E (S-train)	Elevated	1979	27	67	—
Hareskov	A (S-train) B (S-train) Bx (S-train)	Street level	1977	27	3	—
Hellerup^{†#}	B (S-train) C (S-train) E (S-train) F (S-train)	Street level	1934	9	2/30	Regional
Herlev	C (S-train) H (S-train)	Elevated	1949	22	3	Ring 3 light rail (2025)
Hillerød^{†}	E (S-train)	Street level	1968	37	9	Lokaltog
Holte^{†}	B (S-train) E (S-train)	Street level	1936	22	51/61	—
Hundige	A (S-train) E (S-train)	Below street level	1976	24	55/67	—
Husum	C (S-train) H (S-train)	Below street level	1977	20	3	—
Hvidovre	B (S-train) Bx (S-train)	Elevated	1953	15	3	—
Høje Taastrup^{†}	B (S-train) Bx (S-train)	Below street level	1986	30	3	Regional, InterCity, InterCityExpress
Ishøj	A (S-train) E (S-train)	Elevated	1976	21	55	Ring 3 light rail (2025)
Islev	C (S-train)	Elevated	1949	20	3	—
Jersie	E (S-train)	Elevated	1983	35	89/99	—
Jyllingevej	C (S-train)	Street level	1949	19	3	—
Jægersborg^{#}	B (S-train) E (S-train)	Elevated	1936	14	41	Lokaltog
Karlslunde	A (S-train) E (S-train)	Elevated	1979	29	67/77	—
KB Hallen	F (S-train)	Below street level	2005	20	3	—
Kildebakke	A (S-train)	Street level	1977	17	3	—
Kildedal	C (S-train)	Elevated	2000	36	3	—
Klampenborg^{†#}	C (S-train) F (S-train)	Street level	1977	17	3	Regional
København H^{†#}	A (S-train) B (S-train) Bx (S-train) C (S-train) E (S-train) H (S-train)	Underground/Below street level	1934	3	1	Regional, InterCity, InterCityLyn, InterCityExpress, X 2000, Copenhagen Metro
København Syd^{†#}	A (S-train) F (S-train) E (S-train)	Elevated & Street level	2007	5	2	Copenhagen Metro (2024), Regional
Køge^{†}	A (S-train) E (S-train)	Street level	1977	41	20	Lokaltog, Regional, Ferry
Køge Nord^{†#}	A (S-train) E (S-train)	Elevated	2019	?	?	InterCity
Langgade	C (S-train)	Elevated	1941	12	3	—
Lyngby	B (S-train) E (S-train)	Street level	1936	17	41/31	Ring 3 light rail (2025)
Malmparken	C (S-train) H (S-train)	Elevated	1989	25	3	—
Måløv	C (S-train) H (S-train)	Elevated	1989	30	3	—
Nordhavn^{†#}	A (S-train) B (S-train) Bx (S-train) C (S-train) E (S-train)	Elevated	1934	11	1	Copenhagen Metro
Nørrebro	F (S-train)	Elevated	1934	18	2	Copenhagen Metro
Nørreport^{#}	A (S-train) B (S-train) Bx (S-train) C (S-train) E (S-train) H (S-train)	Underground	1934	0	1	Copenhagen Metro, Regional
Ordrup	C (S-train)	Street level	1934	15	3	—
Peter Bangs Vej	C (S-train)	Elevated	1941	14	3	—
Ryparken^{#}	B (S-train) F (S-train) H (S-train)	Elevated	1941	9	3	—
Rødovre	B (S-train) Bx (S-train)	Elevated, Street level	1964	16	3	—
Skovbrynet	A (S-train) B (S-train)	Elevated	1977	25	3	—
Skovlunde	C (S-train) H (S-train)	Elevated	1949	27	3	—
Sjælør	A (S-train) E (S-train)	Street level	1972	10	2	—
Solrød Strand	A (S-train) E (S-train)	Elevated	1979	33	89	—
Sorgenfri	B (S-train) E (S-train)	Below street level	1936	21	51	—
Stengården	A (S-train) Bx (S-train)	Elevated	1977	21	3	—
Stenløse	C (S-train) H (S-train)	Elevated	1989	38	3	—
Svanemøllen^{†#}	A (S-train) B (S-train) Bx (S-train) C (S-train) E (S-train)	Below street level	1934	7	2	—
Sydhavn	A (S-train) E (S-train)	Elevated	1972	8	1/2	—
Taastrup	B (S-train) Bx (S-train)	Elevated	1963	24	3	—
Valby^{†#}	B (S-train) Bx (S-train) C (S-train) H (S-train)	Below street level, street level	1934	11	3	Regional
Vallensbæk	A (S-train)	Elevated	1972	24	44/55	Ring 3 light rail (2025)
Vangede	A (S-train) Bx (S-train)	Below street level	1977	15	3	—
Vanløse^{#}	C (S-train) H (S-train)	Street level, elevated	1941	16	3	Copenhagen Metro
Veksø	C (S-train) H (S-train)	Elevated	1989	34	3	—
Vesterport^{#}	A (S-train) B (S-train) Bx (S-train) C (S-train) E (S-train) H (S-train)	Below street level	1934	2	1	—
Vigerslev Allé	F (S-train)	Elevated	2005	17	3	—
Vinge	C (S-train)	Street level	2020			—
Virum	B (S-train)	Elevated	1936	24	51	—
Værløse	A (S-train) B (S-train) Bx (S-train)	Elevated	1977	30	3	—
Ølby^{#}	E (S-train)	Elevated	1983	39	99/20	Lokaltog, Regional
Ølstykke	C (S-train) H (S-train)	Street level	1989	42	3	—
Østerport^{†#}	A (S-train) B (S-train) Bx (S-train) C (S-train) E (S-train) H (S-train)	Below street level	1934	2	1	Copenhagen Metro, Regional
Ålholm	F (S-train)	Below street level	2005	20	3	—
Åmarken	A (S-train)	Elevated	1972	15	3	—

Enghave station was closed in 2016 to make room for Carlsberg station

Høvelte station is a military station, with very few trains stopping to drop off passengers at Høvelte Barracks..

Kildedal, is not operated on Monday-Friday evenings.

Ny Ellebjerg station was renamed to København Syd on December 10th, 2023.

== Elevated Stations ==
Fuglebakken, Jægersborg, Bernstorffsvej, Nordhavn, Sjælør, Sydhavn, Dyssegård, Jyllingevej, Vanløse and Vigerslev Allé

== Stations with Different Levels ==
Flintholm, København Syd, Rødovre and Danshøj stations have tracks crossing each other at different levels with platforms on each level, while at Ryparken they are on the same level.

== Underground Stations ==
There is only one underground station, Nørreport
