= Langgade railway station =

Railway station in Copenhagen, Denmark

Langgade
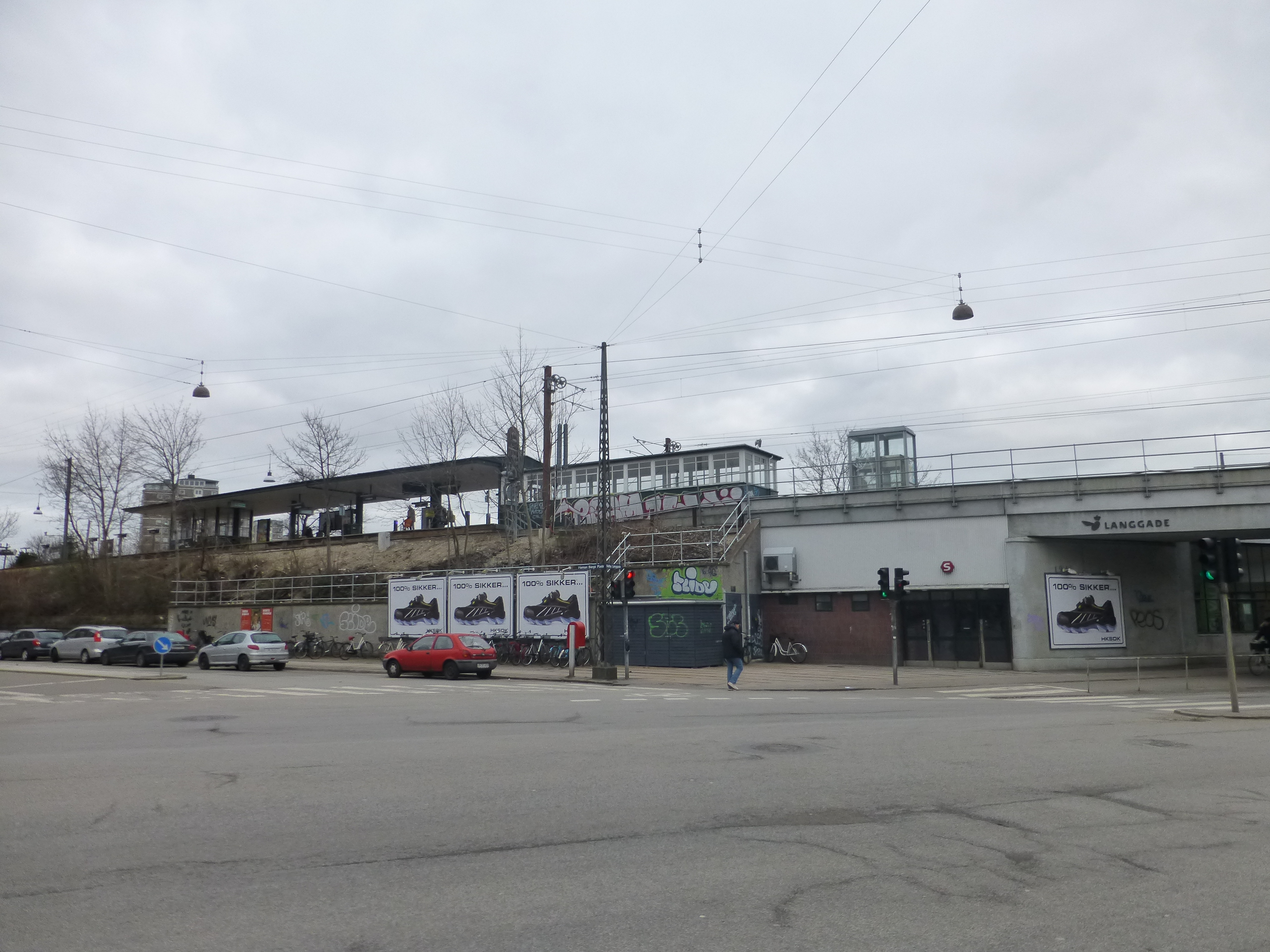
- Langgade station in 2014

General information
- Location: Valby Langgade 128; 2500 Valby; Copenhagen Municipality; Denmark
- Coordinates: 55°40′02″N 12°30′15″E
- Elevation: 11.0 metres (36.1 ft)
- Owner: DSB (station infrastructure); Banedanmark (rail infrastructure)
- Platforms: 1 island platform
- Tracks: 2
- Train operators: DSB
- Bus routes: 26, 93N

Other information
- Station code: Vat
- Fare zone: 2

History
- Opened: 23 September 1941; 85 years ago

Services
| Preceding station | S-train | Following station |
|---|---|---|
| Peter Bangs Vej towards Østerport | H Mon–Fri | Valby towards Ballerup |
| Peter Bangs Vej towards Klampenborg | C Stops evenings & weekends only | Valby towards Frederikssund |
Location

Langgade station is an S-train railway station in the district of Valby in southwestern Copenhagen, Denmark. It is located on the Frederikssund radial of the S-train network in Copenhagen, Denmark.

== Cultural references ==
Yvonne (Kirsten Walther) turns a car around at Valby Langgade station at 1:24:28 in the 1977 Olsen-banden film The Olsen Gang Outta Sight.

== See also ==
- List of Copenhagen S-train stations
- List of railway stations in Denmark
