= Brøndbyøster railway station =

Commuter railway station in Greater Copenhagen, Denmark

Brøndbyøster
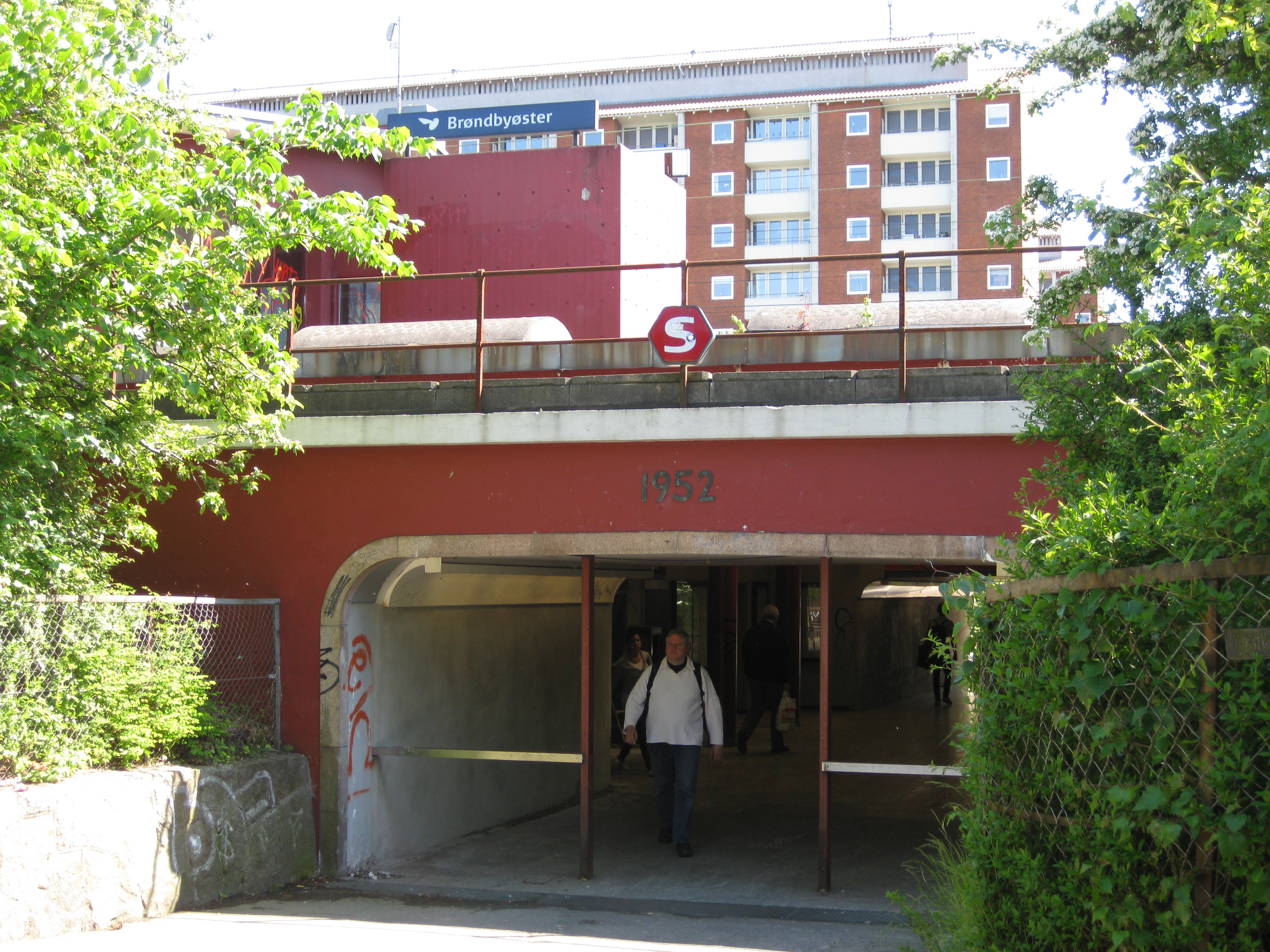
- Brøndbyøster station in 2009

General information
- Location: Gillesager 1; 2605 Brøndby; Brøndby Municipality; Denmark
- Coordinates: 55°39′53.65″N 12°26′22.76″E
- Elevation: 17.5 metres (57 ft)
- Owner: DSB (station infrastructure); Banedanmark (rail infrastructure)
- Line: Høje Taastrup Line
- Platforms: 1 island platform
- Train operators: DSB

Other information
- Website: Official website

History
- Opened: 17 June 1953

Services
Preceding station	S-train	Following station
Rødovre towards Farum	B	Glostrup towards Høje Taastrup
Location

Brøndbyøster station (Danish: Brøndbyøster Station, pronounced [ˈpʁɶnpyˌøstɐ stæˈɕoˀn]) is a suburban rail railway station serving the suburb of Brøndbyøster west of Copenhagen, Denmark. It is located on the Taastrup radial of Copenhagen's S-train network.

== See also ==
- List of Copenhagen S-train stations
- List of railway stations in Denmark
