= Rødovre railway station =

Commuter railway station in Greater Copenhagen, Denmark

Rødovre
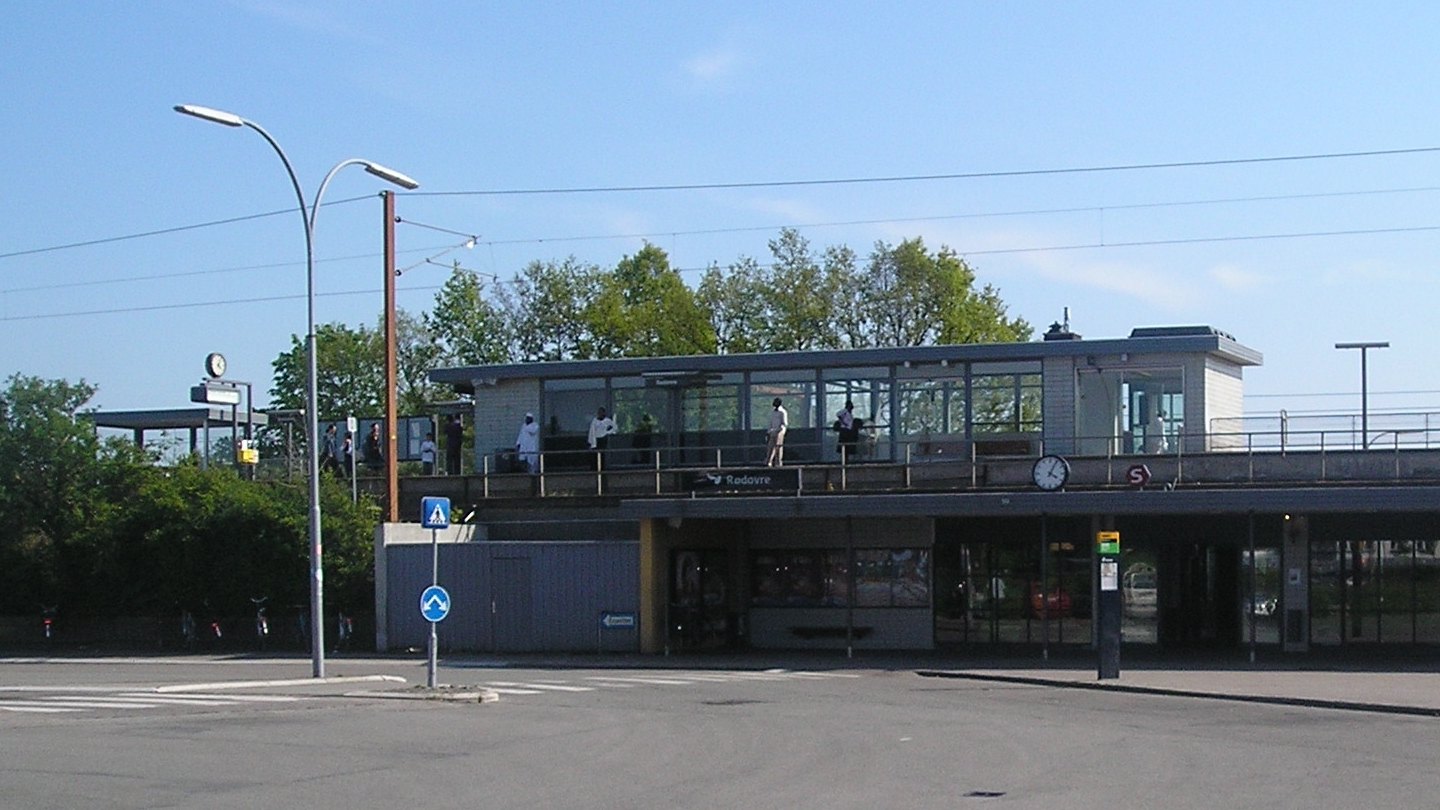
- Rødovre station in 2010

General information
- Location: Rødovre Stationscenter 1; 2610 Rødovre; Rødovre Municipality; Denmark
- Coordinates: 55°39′54″N 12°27′32″E
- Elevation: 17.0 metres (55.8 ft)
- System: S-train station
- Owner: DSB (station infrastructure); Banedanmark (rail infrastructure)
- Platforms: 2 split centre platforms
- Tracks: 2 in service and 2 bypass
- Train operators: DSB

History
- Opened: 24 April 1964

Services
Preceding station	S-train	Following station
Hvidovre towards Farum	B	Brøndbyøster towards Høje Taastrup
Location
- Location within Greater Copenhagen Location within Denmark

Rødovre station is a commuter rail railway station serving the suburbs of Rødovre and Hvidovre west of Copenhagen, Denmark. The station is located on the boundary between Rødovre and Hvidovre municipalities and serves parts of either. It is located on the Taastrup radial of Copenhagen's S-train network.

== Unusual tracks ==
The station has a peculiar layout in that the outgoing (northern) track is elevated about 5 meters above the other tracks; passenger access facilities are located in rooms directly beneath the track, providing (almost) level access to the platform for the ingoing track from the bus terminal north of the station. Allegedly the idea behind this arrangement was that most passengers were traveling to/from Copenhagen, so departing passengers get easy access to their platform whereas upon arrival one merely has to descend the stairs. A new elevator was built in 2004.

The station was opened on 24 April 1964, ten years after the line was opened for S-trains.

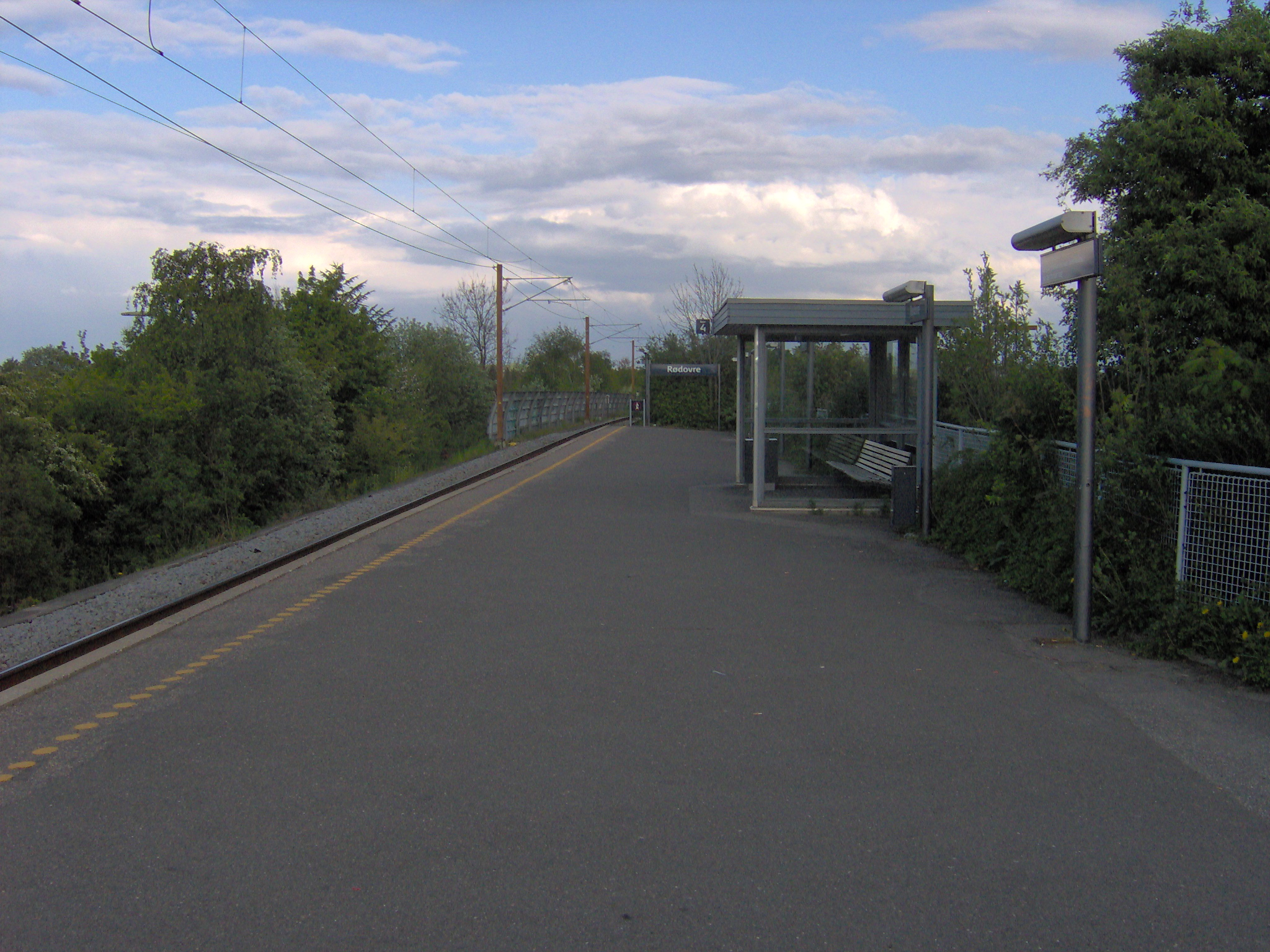
Northerly westbound platform

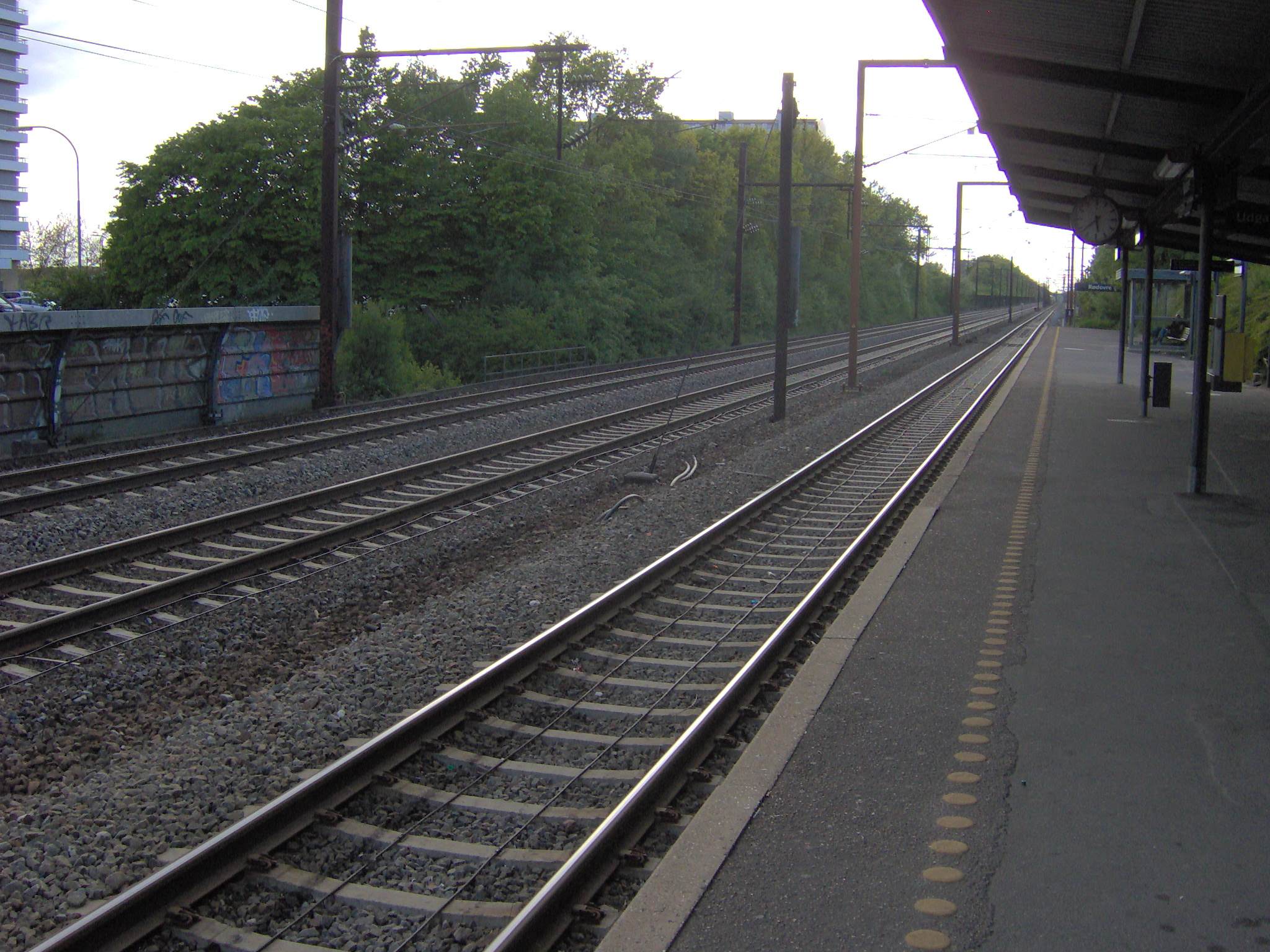
The southern platform for services heading East, next to two long-distance train tracks which bypass the station

== See also ==
- List of Copenhagen S-train stations
- List of railway stations in Denmark
