= Valby railway station =

Main line and suburban railway station in Copenhagen, Denmark

Valby
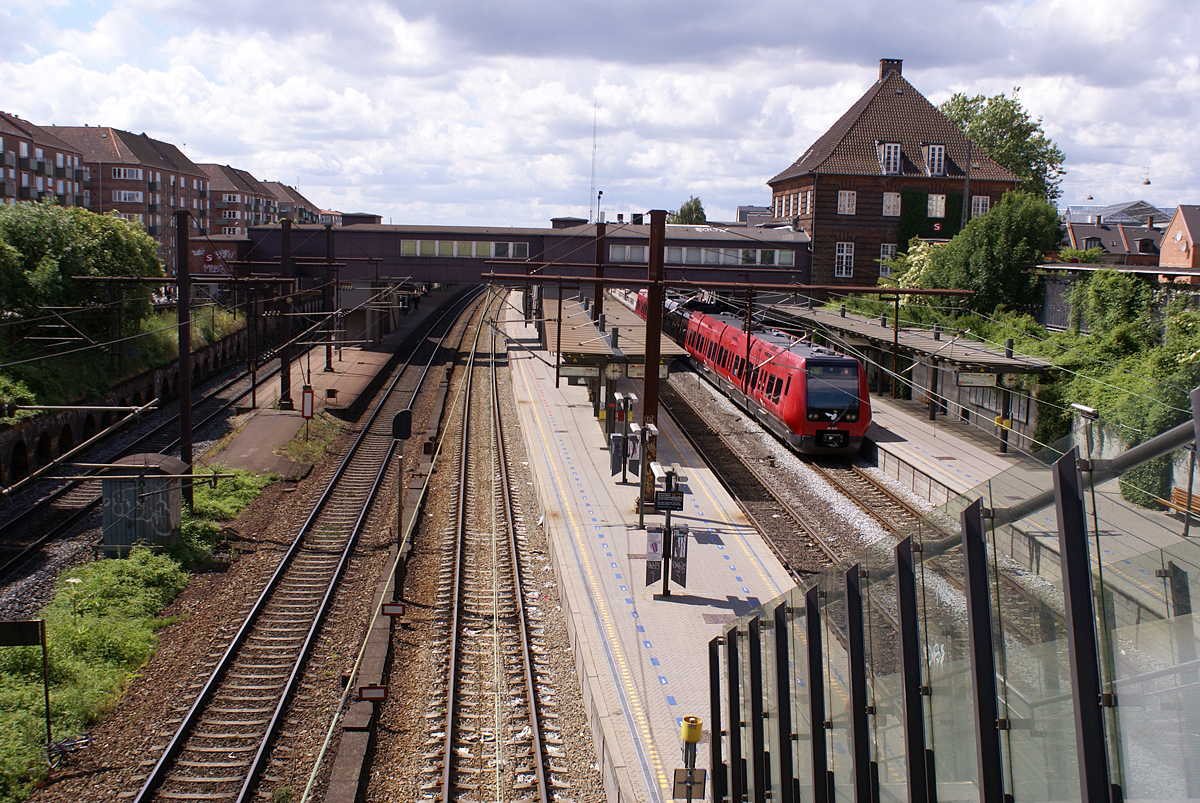
- Valby station in 2008

General information
- Location: Mellemtoftevej 1A; 2500 Valby; Copenhagen Municipality; Denmark
- Coordinates: 55°39′50″N 12°30′52″E
- Elevation: 13.4 metres (44 ft)
- Owner: DSB (station infrastructure); Banedanmark (rail infrastructure)
- Platforms: 1 side platform, 2 island platforms
- Tracks: 5 (3 S-train, 2 mainline)
- Train operators: DSB
- Bus routes: 4A, 18, 133, 888

Construction
- Structure type: At-grade
- Architect: Heinrich Wenck (1911)

Other information
- Station code: Val
- Fare zone: 2
- Website: Official website

History
- Opened: 1911 (Mainline); 1 November 1934 (S-train)
- Electrified: 1934 (S-train), 1988 (Mainline)

Services
Preceding station	DSB	Following station
København H towards Copenhagen Central	Copenhagen-Aalborg InterCity	Høje Taastrup towards Aalborg Airport
København H towards Helsingør	Elsinore–Copenhagen– Roskilde–Næstved Regional train	Høje Taastrup towards Næstved
København H towards Helsingør	Elsinore–Copenhagen– Roskilde–Holbæk Regional train	Høje Taastrup towards Holbæk
Preceding station	S-train	Following station
Carlsberg towards Farum	B	Danshøj towards Høje Taastrup
Carlsberg towards Buddinge	Bx Peak hours	Danshøj towards Høje Taastrup
Carlsberg towards Klampenborg	C	Flintholm towards Frederikssund
Carlsberg towards Klampenborg	C Sat–Sun	Langgade towards Frederikssund
Carlsberg towards Østerport	H Mon–Fri	Langgade towards Ballerup
Location

Valby station is a main line and S-train railway station serving the district of Valby in Copenhagen, Denmark. The station is located in the central part of the district where one of its main arteries Toftegårds Allé crosses the railway line. It is located in a highly populated area, close to the location of the historic village of Valby.

Valby station is one of the most used stations in Copenhagen, and hence regional trains and some intercity trains also stop here. It's an important railway junction, where the Tåstrup and Frederikssund radials of the S-train network diverge, and is served by trains on or from either radial. Several express buses to Jutland also terminate and depart from this station.

== History ==
The first railway station in Valby opened on 26 June 1847 as an intermediate station on the new Copenhagen–Roskilde railway line, the first railway line in the Kingdom of Denmark (Note: The first railway line in the then Danish Monarchy was the Kiel-Altona railway line in the Duchy of Holstein which had been completed three years earlier. However, Holstein was later lost to the Kingdom of Prussia after the Second Schleswig War in 1864, and that railway line is today part of the German rail network.). The station was located slightly east of the current station, and was originally meant to serve mostly leisure trips to nearby Frederiksberg; it had a booming traffic in the railway's first years, which however dwindled as the novelty wore off. The station was closed in 1864 when the second main station in Copenhagen opened and the railway line out of Copenhagen was displaced through Frederiksberg station instead of Valby station.

In 1911, the current (third) central station was inaugurated almost at the site of the first one, and the railway moved back to its original alignment through Valby. The current station was built, this time as a junction between the railways to Roskilde and Frederikssund. Over the years the city had grown towards Valby, so the station now had a sizeable native passenger base.

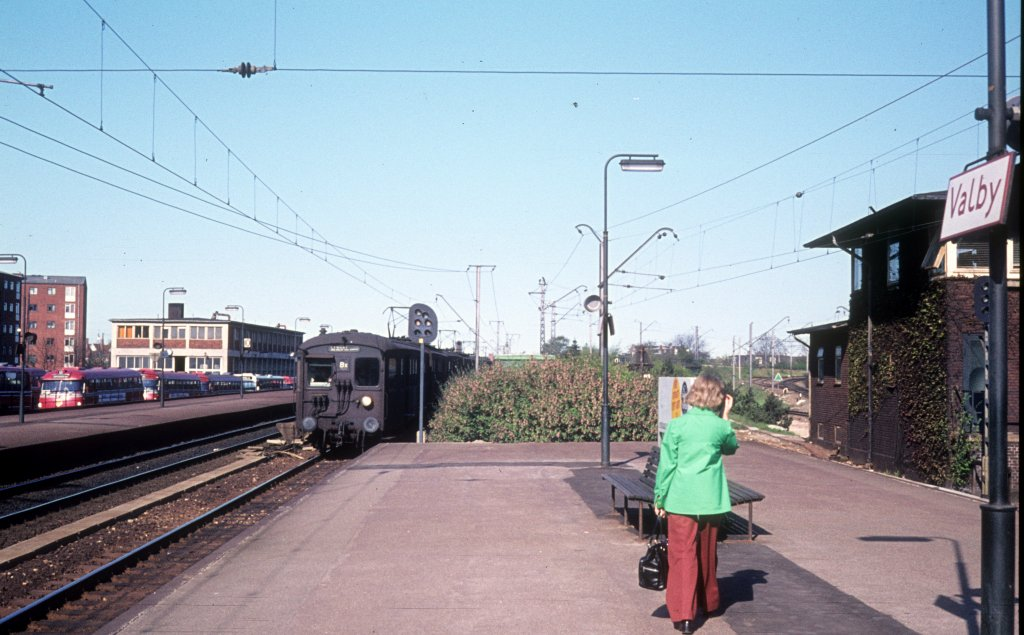
1st generation S-train at Valby station in 1975.

On 1 November 1934, S-trains began running from central Copenhagen to a temporary platform at Valby east of Toftegårds Allé. When the inner part of Frederikssundbanen until Vanløse was electrified on 23 September 1941 the temporary platform closed and the S-trains now stopped at Valby station proper on their way to Vanløse.

In 1950–53, the station was rebuilt once again with a grade-separated junction west of the platforms to join the S-train line towards Vanløse with the new line along Vestbanen, which was inaugurated on 17 June 1953.

== Layout ==
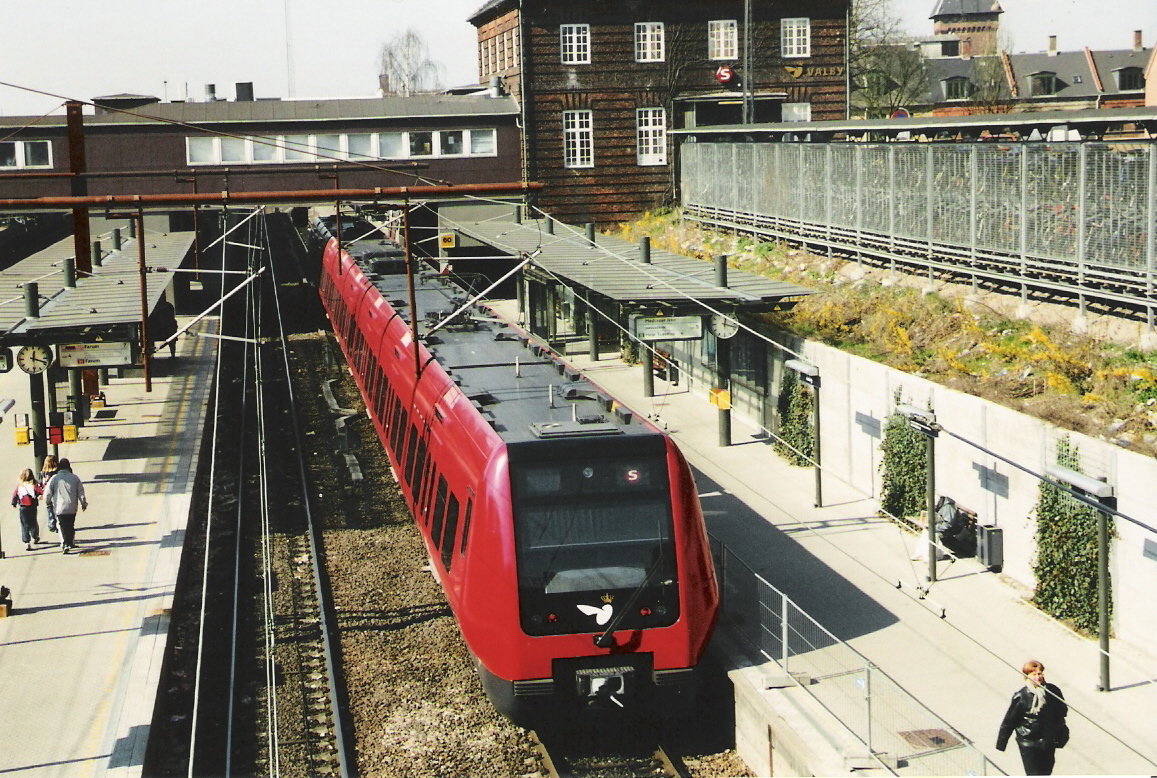
The S-train platforms at Valby station, seen from the Toftegårds Allé bridge

The station has two island platforms plus one track extra, for the S-trains towards Ballerup and (further out) Frederikssund. S-trains in direction to Copenhagen City Centre from Høje Taastrup and Ballerup/Frederikssund use one track each. And regional trains (and a few other trains) uses the other platform, with its two tracks.

All tracks are electrified, however some regional trains and Inter City trains, do still in 2017 use diesel.

== See also ==
- List of Copenhagen S-train stations
- List of railway stations in Denmark
- Rail transport in Denmark
- History of rail transport in Denmark
- Transportation in Copenhagen
- Transportation in Denmark
