= Vestbanen (S-tog) =

Railway line in Greater Copenhagen, Denmark

Høje Taastrup Line

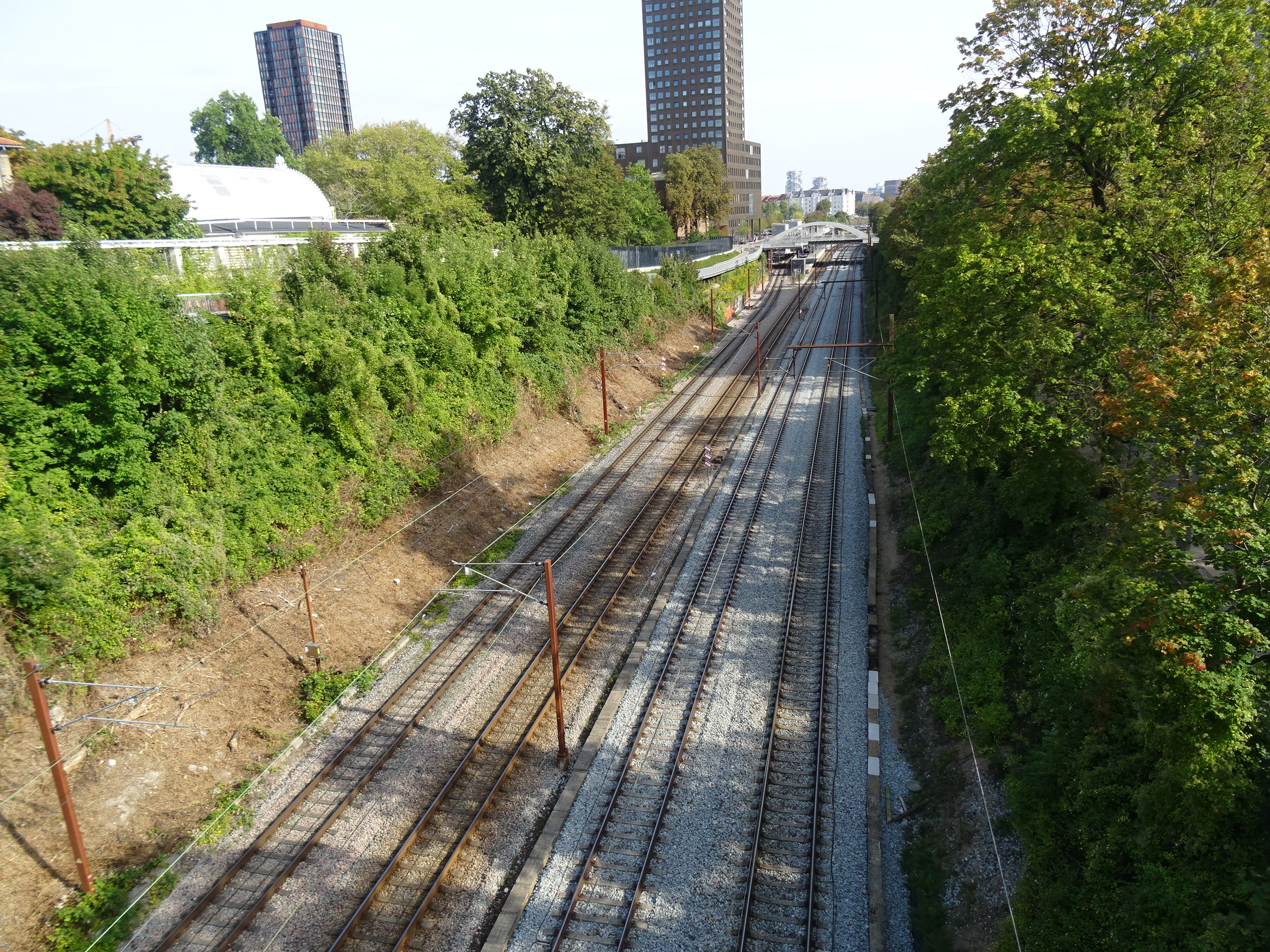
- The tracks of the Høje Taastrup Line (left) along the tracks of the West Line (right) in Valby in 2022

Overview
- Native name: Høje Taastrup-banen
- Owner: Banedanmark
- Line number: 810
- Locale: Greater Copenhagen
- Termini: Copenhagen Central Station; Høje Taastrup
- Stations: 12
- Website: https://bane.dk

Service
- Type: Suburban rail
- System: Copenhagen S-train
- Operator: DSB
- Rolling stock: 4th generation S-train

Technical
- Line length: 19.6 km (12.2 mi)
- Number of tracks: 2
- Character: Grade-separated
- Track gauge: 1,435 mm (4 ft 8 1/2 in) standard gauge
- Electrification: 1,650 V DC overhead line
- Signalling: CBTC
Route map
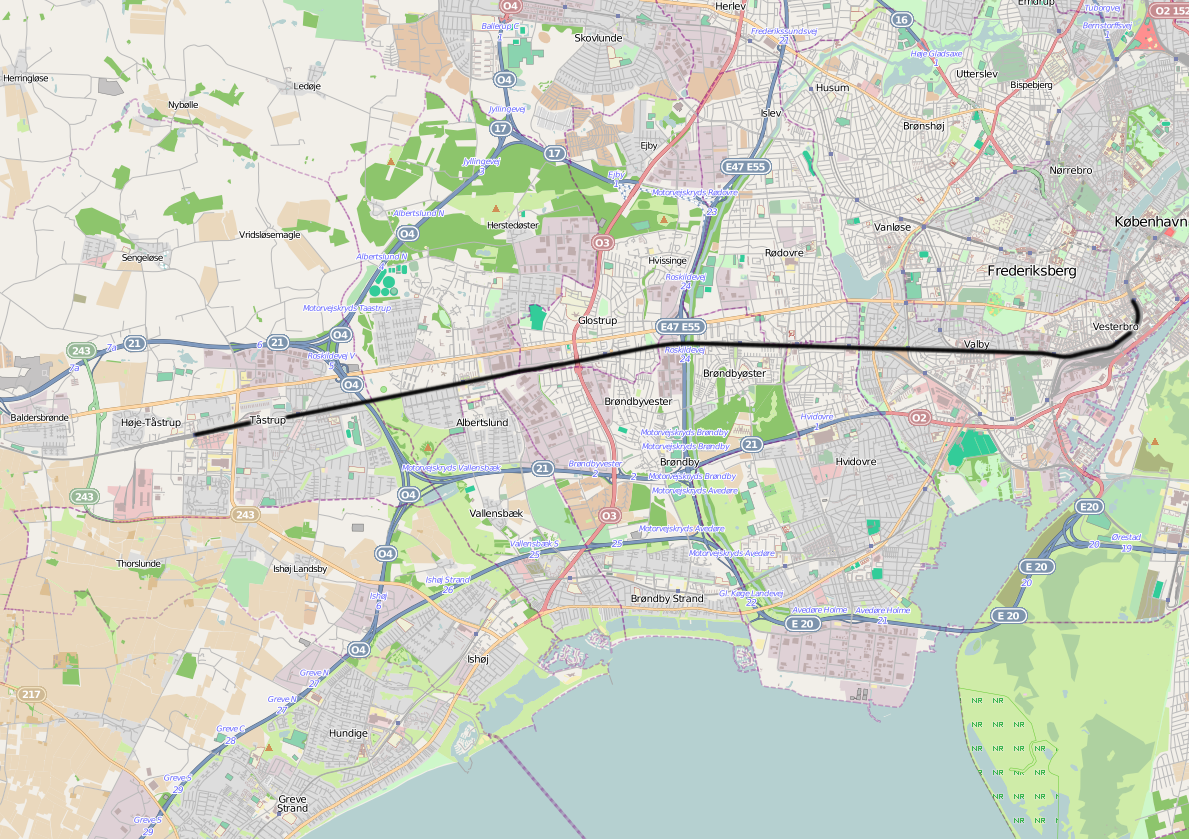
Map of the Copenhagen-Høje Taastrup railway line.

One of the six S-train radial lines in Copenhagen runs along the long-distance tracks on Vestbanen (the railway towards Roskilde and beyond) and provides local train service on its inner parts. The S-trains end at Høje Taastrup. about 20 km west of the city centre.

== History ==
The railway from Copenhagen to Roskilde was opened in 1847 as the first railway in Denmark. The Copenhagen terminus was moved in 1864, and the approaches inside the current Hvidovre station were moved. In 1911, the central station moved back almost to its original site, and the old alignment was reinstated.

In 1934, one of the three main tracks between København H and Valby was electrified for S-trains. A second S-train track was also built between København H and just before Enghave; between those two tracks was the maintenance depot for S-train, until the current depot at Taastrup opened in 1968.

The single S-train track from Enghave to Valby was doubled in 1941, at the same time as the S-train line was extended to Vanløse (on the Frederikssund radial). In 1953, new S-train tracks north of the main line were opened as far as Glostrup. It was originally single-tracked outside Hvidovre, but a second track was added in 1963 shortly before the S-train line was extended to Tåstrup.

For many years, the S-trains ended in Tåstrup, and most regional trains on the mainline stopped at Tåstrup to provide transfers to the S-trains. In 1986, this transfer function moved to the new Høje Taastrup station a few kilometers west of Tåstrup. The Høje Taastrup station was built on open land that was planned to become a minor regional center, and was envisaged as a relief station for the central København H. Thus, all long-distance trains going west from Copenhagen stop there. The area around the station has become more built-up since its opening, but the grand plans to let it become a "second city center" have not quite been reached.

Around 2000, plans to extend the S-train service beyond Høje Tåstrup to Roskilde reached a fairly advanced stage, before finally being dropped in May 2002. As of 2006, such plans were occasionally discussed politically.

== Stations ==
Name	Services	Opened	S-trains	Comments
Østerport	B, Bx	2 August 1897	15 May 1934	Also all other radials; named Østerbro until 1934
Nørreport	B, Bx	1 July 1918	15 May 1934	Also all other radials; transfer to metro; bus terminal; cross-link express buses 150S and 350S
Vesterport	B, Bx	15 May 1934		Also all other radials
København H	B, Bx	30 November 1911	15 May 1934	Central station; also all other radials; cross-link express bus 250S
Dybbølsbro	B, Bx	1 November 1934		Also Køge and Frederikssund radials
Carlsberg	B, Bx	30 November 1911	1 November 1934	Also Frederikssund radial; named Vester Fælledvej until 1923
Valby	B, Bx	30 November 1911	1 November 1934	Also Frederikssund radial; transfer to regional trains
Danshøj	B, Bx	8 January 2005		Transfer to ring line
Hvidovre	B	1935	17 June 1953	
Rødovre	B	24 April 1964		Cross-link express bus 200S
Brøndbyøster	B	17 June 1953		
Glostrup	B, Bx	26 June 1847	17 June 1953	Major bus terminal; cross-link express buses 300S, 500S
Albertslund	B, Bx	1931	26 May 1963	Named Vridsløselille until 1963
Taastrup	B, Bx	26 June 1847	26 May 1963	Bus terminal
Høje Taastrup	B, Bx	31 May 1986		Transfer to regional, intercity trains; major bus terminal; cross-link express bus 400S

== Service patterns ==
The principal service is B, which stops at all stations. During rush hours, it is supplemented with express trains on service Bx.

== See also ==
- List of Copenhagen S-train lines
- Transportation in Copenhagen
- List of railway lines in Denmark
- Rail transport in Denmark
- Transportation in Denmark
- History of rail transport in Denmark
- S-train (Copenhagen)
- Banedanmark
