= Brøndby Municipality =

Brøndby Municipality Brøndby Kommune (Danish)
- Municipality
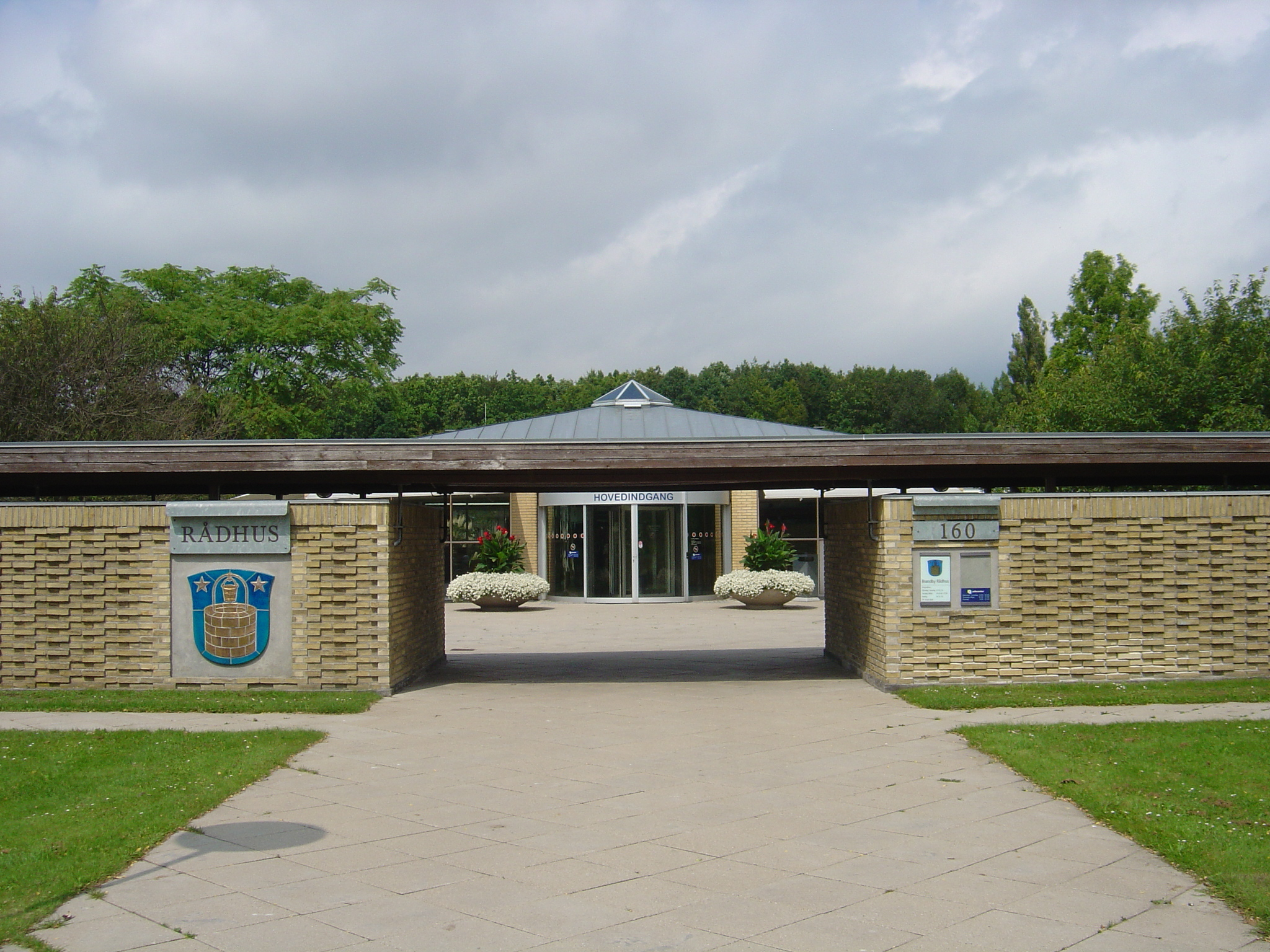
- Brøndby Rådhus (town hall) on Park Allé

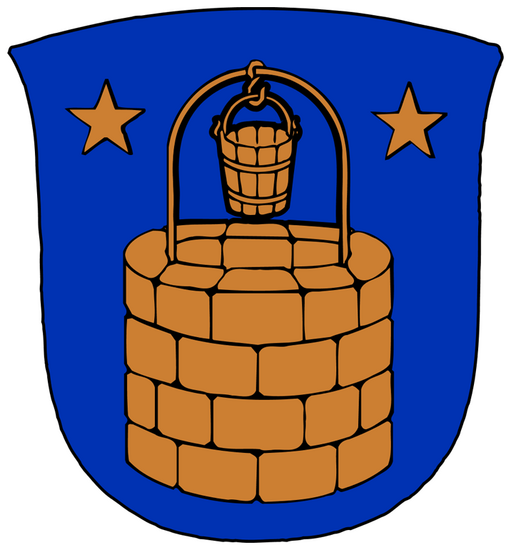
- Coat of arms

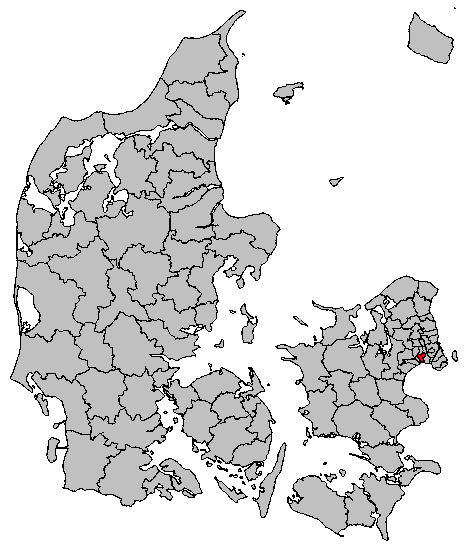
- Coordinates: 55°39′17″N 12°24′59″E
- Country: Denmark
- Region: Hovedstaden
- Established: 1 January 1842
- Seat: Brøndbyvester

Government
  - Mayor: Maja Højgaard (S)

Area
  - Total: 20.85 km^{2} (8.05 sq mi)

Population (1 January 2026)
  - Total: 40,990
  - Density: 1,966/km^{2} (5,092/sq mi)
- Time zone: UTC+1 (CET)
  - Summer (DST): UTC+2 (CEST)
- Postal code: 2605
- Municipal code: 153
- Website: www.brondby.dk

Brøndby Kommune (Danish: [ˈpʁɶnpy kʰoˈmuːnə]), a municipality (Danish: kommune) in the former Copenhagen County (now Region Hovedstaden), is on the east coast of the island of Zealand (Sjælland) in eastern Denmark. The municipality covers an area of 20.85 km^{2} (8.05 sq mi), and has a total population of 40,990 (2026). Its mayor is Maja Højgaard, a member of the Social Democrats (Socialdemokraterne) political party.

The site of its municipal council is the town of Brøndbyvester. Neighboring municipalities are Hvidovre to the east, Rødovre to the north, Glostrup to the north, Albertslund to the northwest, and Vallensbæk to the west. To the south is Køge Bay (Køge Bugt).

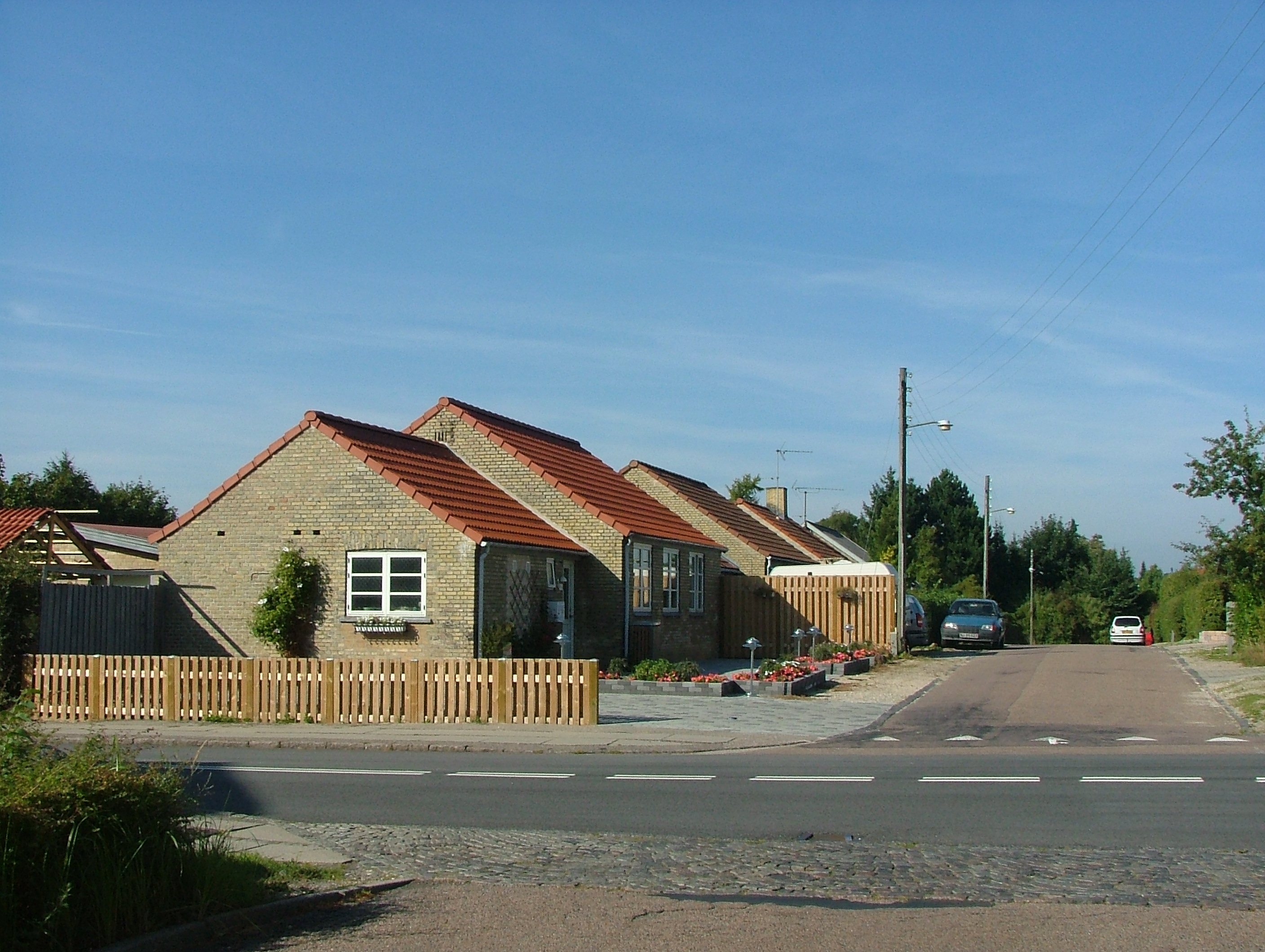
A neighborhood in Brøndby

The geography of Brøndby municipality was not affected by the nationwide Kommunalreformen ("The Municipality Reform" of 2007) on 1 January 2007.

== Districts ==
Brøndby is divided into three main districts: Brøndbyvester to the west, Brøndbyøster to the east, and Brøndby Strand in the southern part of the municipality.

Brøndbyvester is the historic core of the area. It contains several preserved farmhouses, while most of the present-day housing stock consists of detached single-family homes typical of post-war suburban development. Brøndbyøster lies immediately east of the main road interchange that separates the three districts and features a mix of apartment blocks and low-rise residential areas with a relatively high share of elderly residents and immigrants.

Brøndby Strand combines low-rise neighbourhoods with twelve high-rise estates constructed during Denmark's large-scale housing expansion in the 1960s and 1970s. It was the first locality in the country where residents of foreign origin constituted more than half of the population. The high-rise complexes are collectively known as Brøndby Strand Parkerne.

Brøndby is also home to Brøndby IF, one of Denmark's most prominent football clubs.

== Politics ==
=== Municipal council ===
Brøndby's municipal council consists of 19 members, elected every four years.

Below are the municipal councils elected since the Municipal Reform of 2007.

Election	Party									Total seats	Turnout	Elected mayor
Election	A	B	C	D	F	O	V	Ø	Å	Total seats	Turnout	Elected mayor
2005	11		1		1	2	3		1	19	61.1%	Ib Terp (A)
2009	7		1		4	4	2		1	19	58.2%	Ib Terp (A)
2013	10				1	4	3	1		19	64.6%	Ib Terp (A)
2017	11	1			1	3	2	1		19	62.0%	Kent Max Magelund (A)
2021	11	1	2	1	1	1	1	1		19	55.5%	Kent Max Magelund (A)
2025	8	1	2		2	4		2		19	56.2%	Maja Højgaard (A)
Data from Kmdvalg.dk 2005, 2009, 2013, 2017 and 2021. Data from valg.dk 2025

== Twin towns – sister cities ==
Brøndby is twinned with:

- Botkyrka, Sweden
- Dorogomilovo (Moscow), Russia
- Stange, Norway
- Steglitz-Zehlendorf (Berlin), Germany

== See also ==
- Brøndbyøster railway station
- Brøndby Strand railway station
