= Brøndbyøster =

- Town
- The location of Brøndbyøster in Denmark
- Coordinates: 55°39′35″N 12°26′24″E
- Country: Denmark
- Region: Region Hovedstaden
- Municipality: Brøndby

Population (2018)
  - Total: 11,795
- Time zone: UTC+1 (CET)
  - Summer (DST): UTC+2 (CEST)
- Postal codes: 2605

Brøndbyøster (Danish pronunciation: [ˈpʁɶnpyˌøstɐ]) is a Danish town in the Brøndby Municipality, in the Region Hovedstaden.

== Notable people ==
- Alex Ambrose (born 1978 in Brøndbyøster) stage name Alex, is a Danish singer, songwriter and actor
- Anton Skipper (born 2000 in Brøndbyøster) a Danish football defender who plays for Brøndby IF
