= Høje Taastrup railway station =

Railway station in Greater Copenhagen, Denmark

Høje Taastrup
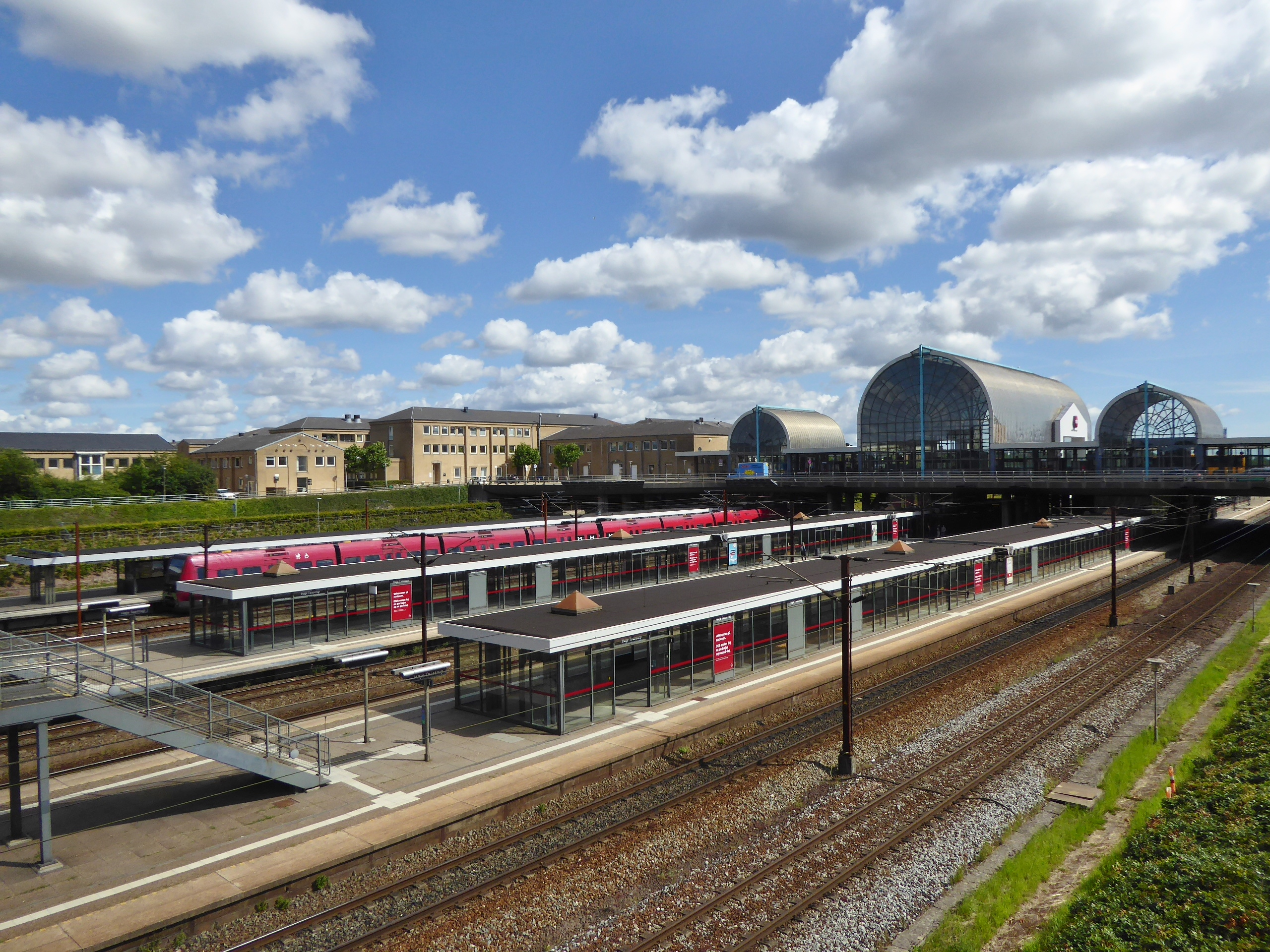
- Høje Taastrup station in 2020

General information
- Location: 5 Banestrøget; 2630 Taastrup; Høje-Taastrup Municipality; Denmark
- Coordinates: 55°38′55″N 12°16′09″E
- Elevation: 32.8 metres (108 ft)
- Owner: DSB (station infrastructure); Banedanmark (rail infrastructure)
- Platforms: 3 island platforms
- Tracks: 6
- Train operators: DSB

Other information
- Website: Official website

History
- Opened: 31 May 1986
- Electrified: 1986 (S-train), 1988 (Mainline)

Services
Preceding station	Long distance trains	Following station
Örestad towards Stockholm Central	Snälltåget seasonal	Hamburg Hbf towards Berlin Hbf
Preceding station	DSB	Following station
Valby towards Copenhagen Central	Copenhagen-Aalborg InterCity	Roskilde towards Aalborg Airport
Copenhagen South towards Copenhagen Airport	Copenhagen–Slagelse Regional train	Trekroner towards Slagelse
Valby towards Helsingør	Elsinore–Copenhagen– Roskilde–Næstved Regional train	Hedehusene towards Næstved
København H towards Østerport	Copenhagen–Kalundborg Regional train	Roskilde towards Kalundborg
Valby towards Helsingør	Elsinore–Copenhagen– Roskilde–Holbæk Regional train	Hedehusene towards Holbæk
Preceding station	S-train	Following station
Taastrup towards Farum	B	Terminus
Taastrup towards Buddinge	Bx Peak hours	Terminus
Location

Høje Taastrup station (Danish pronunciation: [ˈhʌjə ˈtsʰʌˌstʁɔp stæˈɕoˀn]) is a railway station in Høje-Taastrup Municipality in Greater Copenhagen, Denmark. The station constitutes an important transport hub for public transport in the western suburbs of Copenhagen.

The station opened in 1986 and is one of the largest in Denmark. It is located on the main line Copenhagen–Fredericia railway line which connects Copenhagen with Funen and Jutland. It is also the western terminus of the Taastrup radial of Copenhagen's S-train network. The station is further served by regional, InterCity and even international trains.

The station building's distinctive architecture with its three arches has become a symbol of Høje Taastrup Municipality.

== History ==
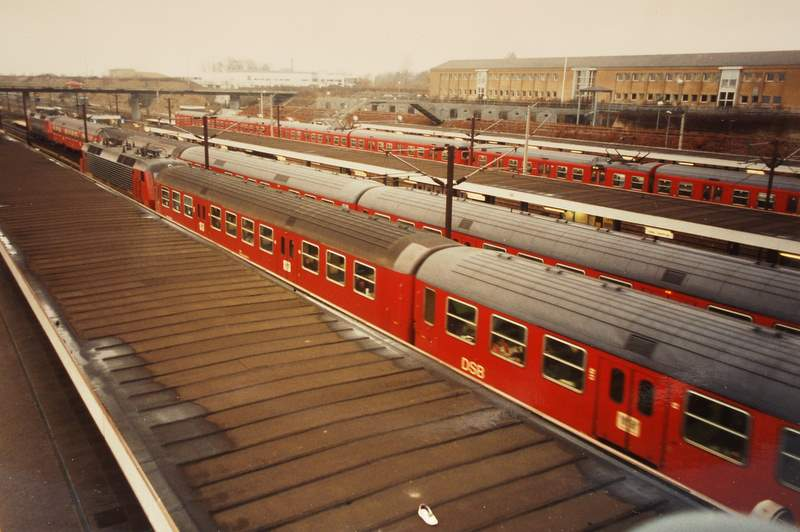
Høje Taastrup station in 1994.

Høje Taastrup railway station was ceremonially opened by Queen Margrethe II of Denmark on 31 May 1986 together with the extension of the Taastrup radial of Copenhagen's S-train network from Taastrup to Høje Taastrup. In the first years, only S-trains and regional trains called at the station, but since the opening of the 3rd and 4th railway track between Høje-Taastrup and Roskilde in 1988, all long-distance trains have also called at the station.

== Architecture ==
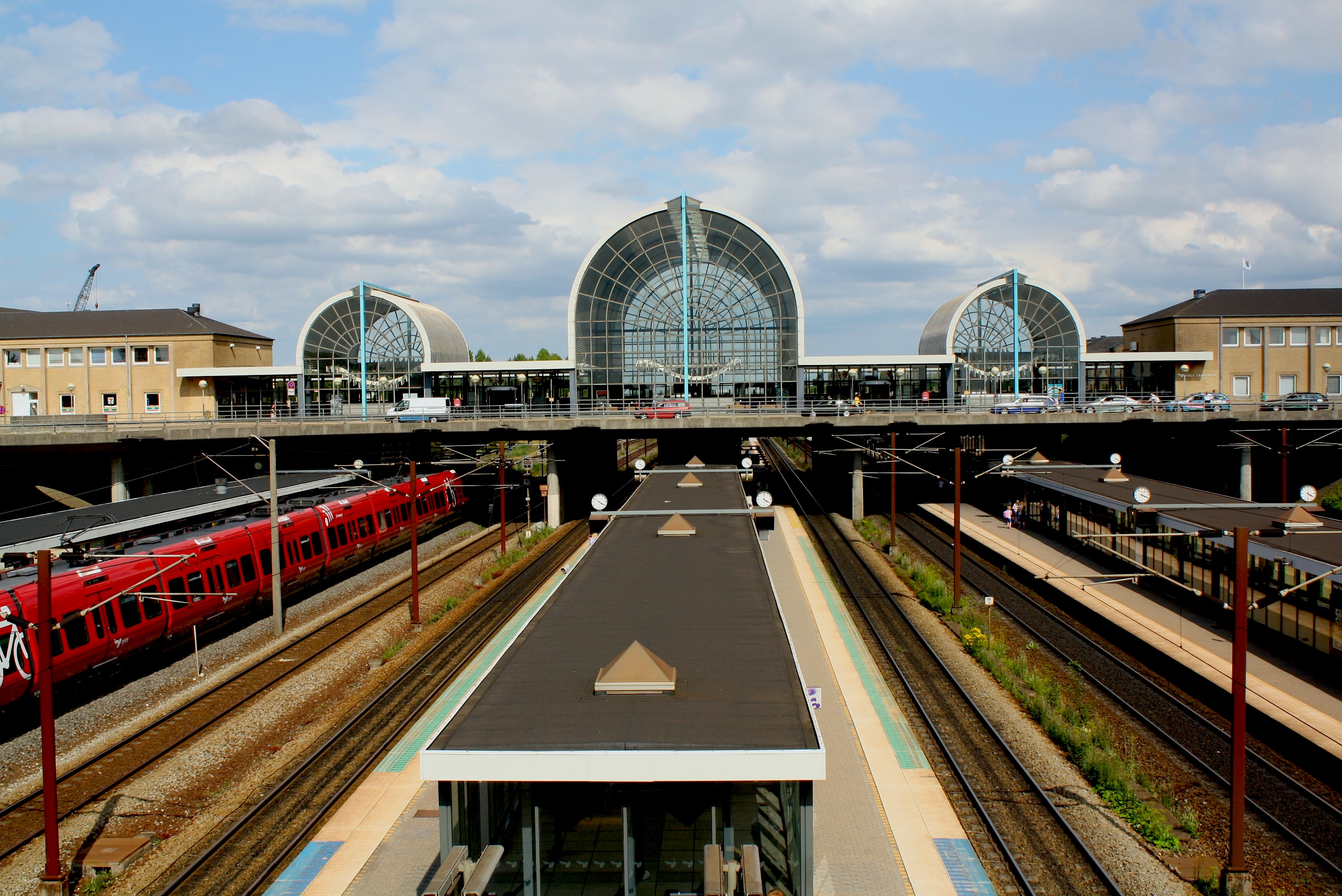
The three arches of Høje Taastrup station.

The station was built to designs by the Danish architecture studio Jacob Blegvad A/S, which has also been responsible for urban development in the area around the station. The station building itself is located on a wide bridge that leads across the tracks, and which is also the location for a bus terminal. The postmodern building is dominated by three distinctive barrel vault arches which have become a symbol of the municipality, and have given rise to the moniker "The City of Arches" (Danish: Buernes By, which in a play on words sounds remarkably similar to the phrase Byernes By or "The City of Cities"). The artistic decoration of the station is made by the Danish painter and visual artist Henning Damgård-Sørensen.

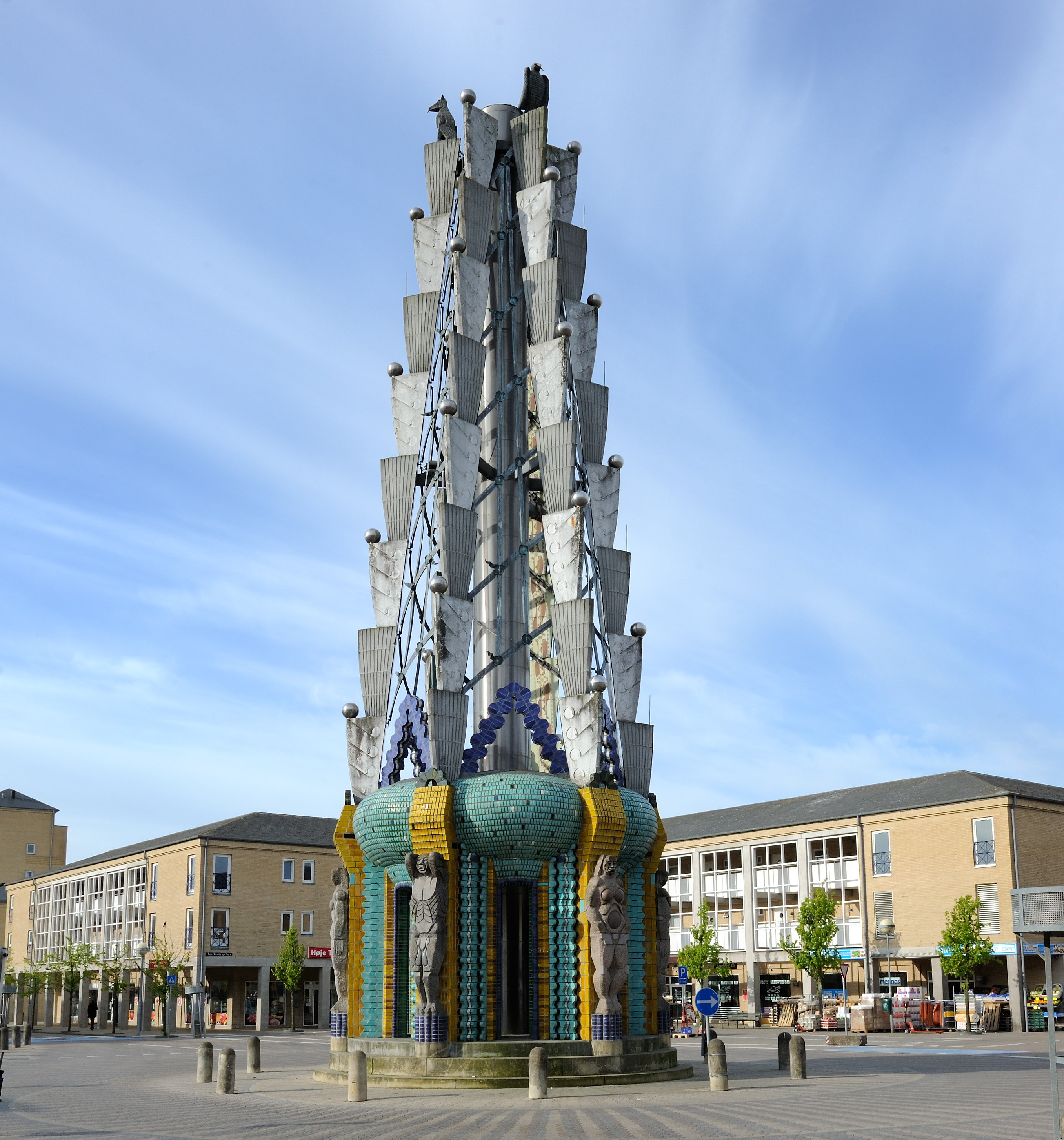
Thor's Tower

At the south end of the station complex stands the sculpture Thor's Tower (Danish: Torstårnet), made by the Danish artist Bjørn Nørgaard in 1986. Standing 26.5 m (87 ft) high, it is the tallest sculpture in the Nordic countries. It consists of many different materials including some 20,000 glazed tiles, granite figures, grey and white concrete facing as well as various metals and coloured glass. The neon tubes encircling the central pillar shine at night. Inspired by Nordic mythology, the sculpture relies on the connection between Taastrup's etymological relationship with the god Thor.

== Facilities ==
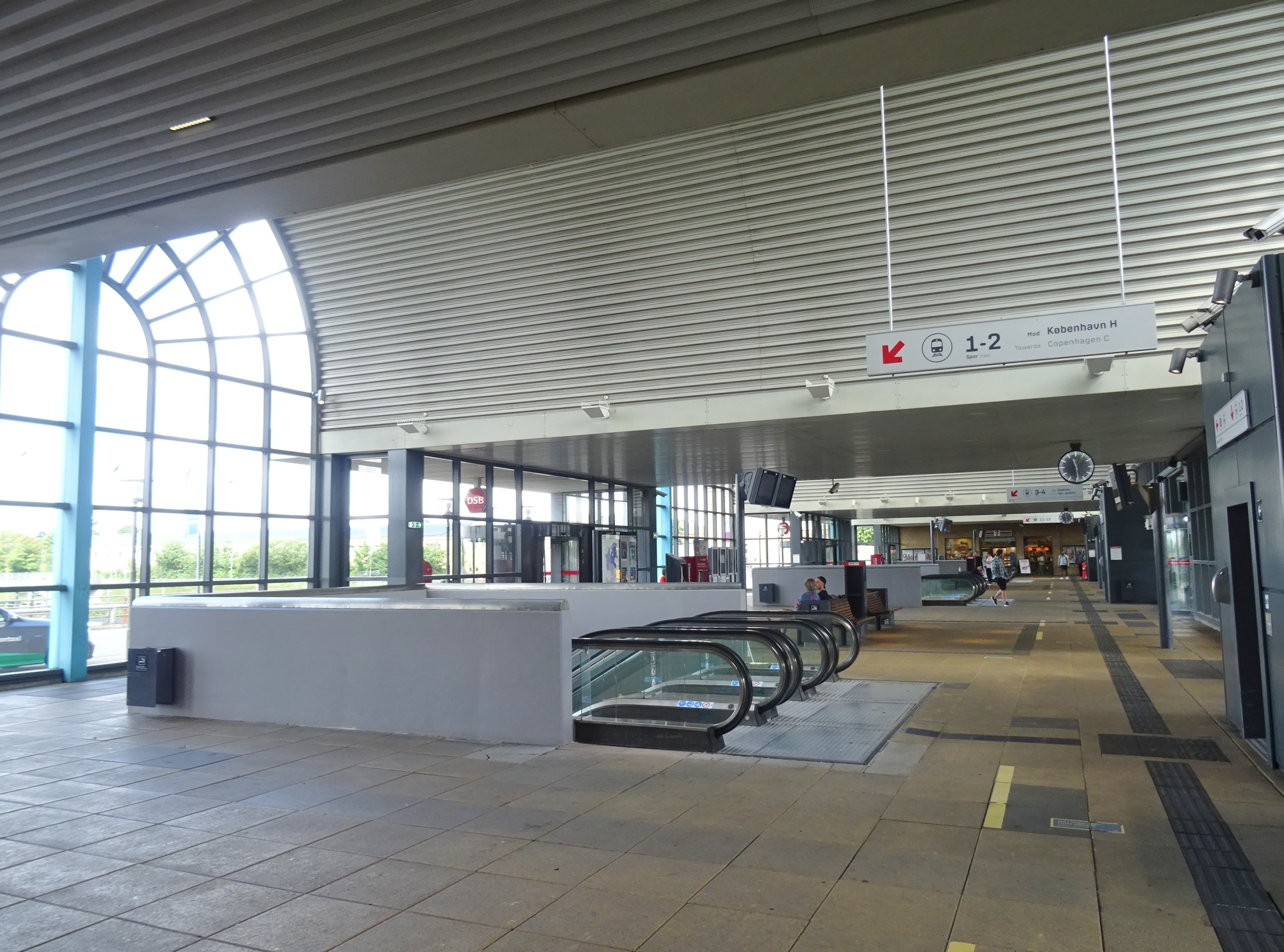
Interior of the station building.

Inside the station building there is a combined ticket office and convenience store operated by 7-Eleven, ticket machines, waiting room, and toilets.

Immediately adjacent to the station is a large bus terminal. The station has a bicycle parking station as well as a free long-term car park with approximately 400 parking spaces.

== Operations ==
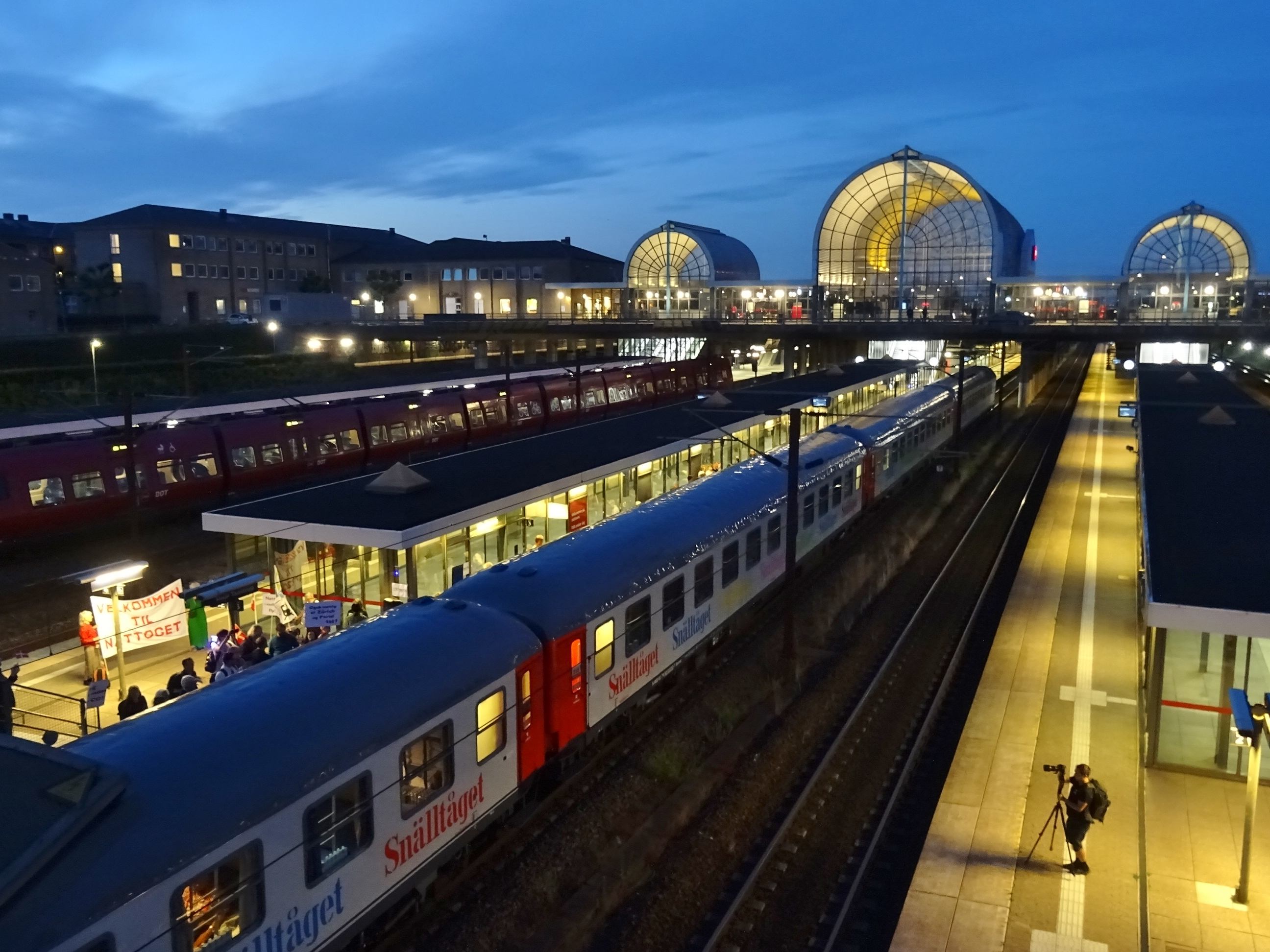
Night train from Stockholm to Berlin at Høje Taastrup station in 2021.

Høje Taastrup station is the western terminus of S-train services B and Bx on the Taastrup radial. The station is further served by regional trains across Sjælland, InterCity trains to Funen and Jutland and even international trains to Sweden and Germany.

== See also ==
- List of Copenhagen S-train stations
- List of railway stations in Denmark
- Rail transport in Denmark
- History of rail transport in Denmark
- Transportation in Copenhagen
- Transportation in Denmark
- Danish State Railways
- Banedanmark
