= Hareskovby =

Suburb of Copenhagen, Denmark

Coordinates: 55°46′N 12°25′E

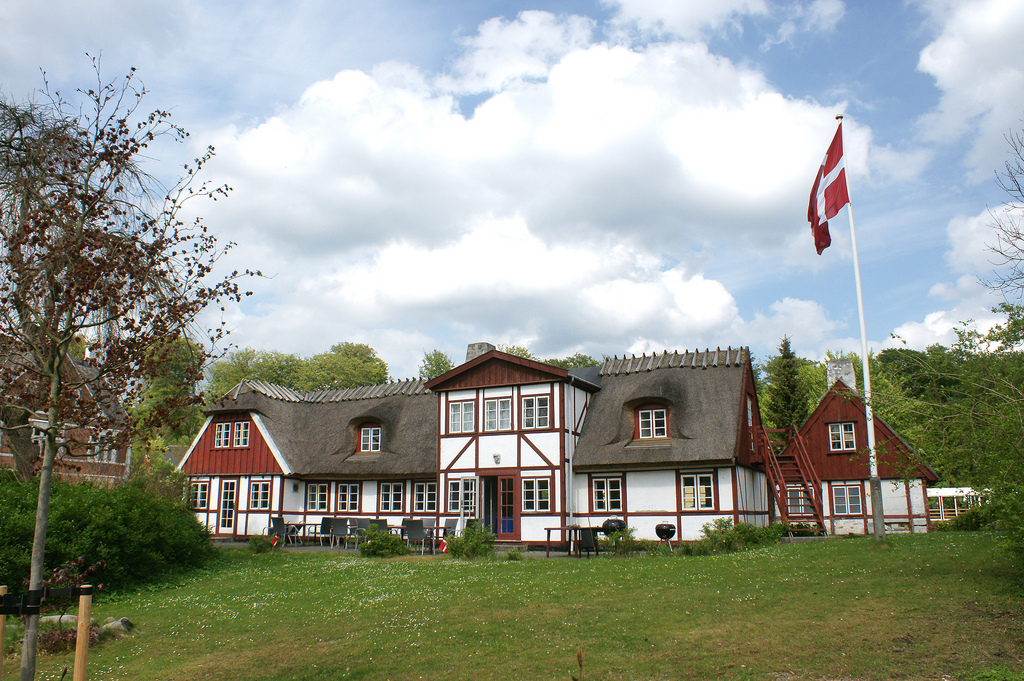
The Annex Farm in Hareskovby

Hareskovby, or Hareskov By, is a small suburb to Copenhagen, Denmark, located just south and west of Hareskoven, one of the largest forested areas in the city's northern suburbs. It straddles the border between Furesø and Herlev municipalities and the contiguously built-up area extends into Gladsaxe and Ballerup municipalities, though these areas are not called Hareskov or Hareskovby.

== History ==
The area was known as Lille Værløse Overdrev (Little Værløse Meadows) prior to the opening of Hareskov railway station on the new Slangerup Line in 1907. The first houses and the Hareskov Pavilion were built shortly thereafter and a thriving town developed over the next few decades.

== Description ==
The part of Hareskovby lying within the Furesø municipality has its own school and library. Many of the roads in Hareskovby are named after plants and flowers such as 'rose', 'clover' (Rosevej; Kløvervej in Danish with the Danish suffix -vej for 'road').

== Notable people ==
- Jørgen Skafte Rasmussen (1878–1964) a Danish engineer and industrialist, from 1947 to 1953 he lived in Hareskovby and built motor-bikes
- Greta Thyssen (1927 in Hareskovby – 2018) a Danish film actress and former model, long time US resident, she appeared in films and television series between 1956 and 1967
- Thorbjørn Olesen (born 1989 in Hareskovby) a Danish professional golfer who plays on the European Tour
