= 1906 in rail transport =

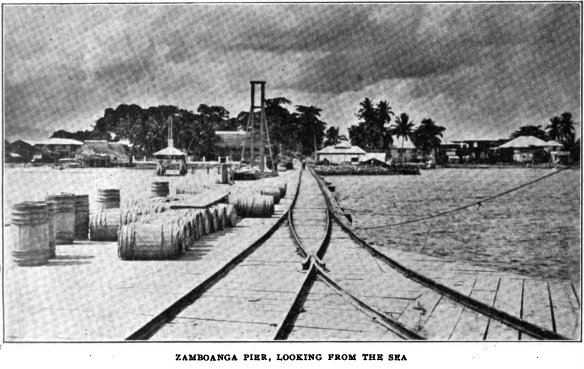
Zamboanga Pier with railroad in 1906

This article lists events related to rail transport that occurred in 1906.

== Events ==
=== January events ===
- January 3 – At the annual stockholder's meeting, the charter for the Cleveland Short Line Railway is amended to specify Collinwood, Ohio and Rockport, Ohio as the terminals of the railroad.
- January 17 – Atchison, Topeka and Santa Fe Railway fully acquires its subsidiary Southern California Railway.
- January 27 – Rail line completed to the Red Sea at Port Sudan from Atbara.

=== February events ===
- February 2 – The Cairo Electric Railways and Heliopolis Oases Company is formed.

=== March events ===
- March 10 – The Baker Street and Waterloo Railway opens in London.

=== April events ===
- April – The Great Western Railway of England turns out the prototype of its 4-cylinder GWR 4000 Class steam locomotive, designed by George Jackson Churchward, from its Swindon Works.
- April 18 – The great 1906 San Francisco earthquake strikes, damaging the Southern Pacific Railroad's headquarters building and destroying the mansions of the now-deceased Big Four. Also destroyed are many cable car routes, which will be replaced with electric streetcars.
- April 19 – Lygten Station opens in Copenhagen, Denmark, as the terminus of the Copenhagen–Slangerup Railway.

=== May events ===
- May 8 – A special train carrying E.H. Harriman makes a run from Oakland CA to New York in 761 hours and 27 minutes. This record will stand until October 1934, when it will be broken by Union Pacific Streamliner M-10000.
- May 19 – The Simplon Tunnel between Italy and Switzerland, the world's longest tunnel until 1979, opens to rail traffic.

=== July events ===
- July 1 (1:57 am) – 24 passengers and 4 railwaymen die as the result of the 1906 Salisbury rail crash on the London and South Western Railway of England when an express train passes through Salisbury railway station at excessive speed.
- July 7 – Completion of the Tauern Tunnel (8.5 km (5.3 mi)) in Austria.
- July 22 – The State Street Line, Chicago's last cable car route, ends operations.

=== August events ===
- August 1 – The Green Bay and Western acquires a majority interest in the Ahnapee and Western Railway in Wisconsin.

=== September events ===
- September 8 – Ottawa's Bank Street subway is opened as streetcar number 253 of the Ottawa Electric Railway traverses the tunnel.
- September 19 – 14 die as a result of the Grantham rail accident on the Great Northern Railway (Great Britain) when a sleeping car train is derailed passing through Grantham railway station at excessive speed.
- September 21 – A Grand Trunk Railway passenger train hits a stopped freight train at a crossover in Napanee, Ontario; the engineer stays at the controls trying to slow his train as much as possible and becomes the only fatality. The train's passengers later erect a monument in the engineer's honor.

=== October events ===
- October 1 – Karawanks Tunnel is opened to provide a through route between Klagenfurt and Trieste in Austria-Hungary.
- October 10 – Valdresbanen is completed from Oslo to Fagernes, Norway.

=== November events ===
- November 13 – Shinpei Goto begins his term as the first president of South Manchuria Railway.
- November 12 – Dunedin railway station in New Zealand is officially opened.
- November 29 – Samuel Spencer, president of the Southern Railway (US), is killed in a railroad accident; he will be succeeded by William Finley.
- November – The last locomotive built by the Portland Company is completed for the Bridgton and Saco River Railroad.

=== December events ===
- December 2 - Construction begins on Santa Fe's Rocky Ford, Colorado, station; the station is completed and occupied by the end of March 1907.
- December 7 – The Southern Pacific Railroad and Union Pacific Railroad jointly form the Pacific Fruit Express Company (PFE) refrigerator car line.
- December 14 – John D. Spreckels announces he will form the San Diego & Arizona Railway Company and build a 148-mile (238-kilometre) line between San Diego and El Centro, California. Spreckels has an agreement with the Southern Pacific Railroad to silently fund the project.
- December 15
  - The Great Northern, Piccadilly and Brompton Railway opens in London.
  - The SEPTA trolley subway opens as Route 34 is routed underground in Philadelphia.
- December 28
  - Elliot Junction rail accident in Scotland: 22 killed in a collision during a blizzard.
  - After his death, Alexander J. Cassatt is succeeded as president of the Pennsylvania Railroad by James McRea.
- December 30 – A train wreck at Terra Cotta near modern-day Fort Totten in Washington, D.C., kills 52; the accident leads to the Interstate Commerce Commission banning future wooden body passenger car construction.

=== Unknown date events ===
- Prussian S 6 Class 4-4-0 steam locomotives introduced; 584 are eventually built to this design.

== Deaths ==
=== June deaths ===
- June 4 – Francis Webb, Chief Mechanical Engineer of the London and North Western Railway (born 1836).

=== December deaths ===
- December 28 – Alexander J. Cassatt, president of the Pennsylvania Railroad 1899–1906 (born 1839).
