= Hareskov railway station =

Commuter railway station in Greater Copenhagen, Denmark

Hareskov
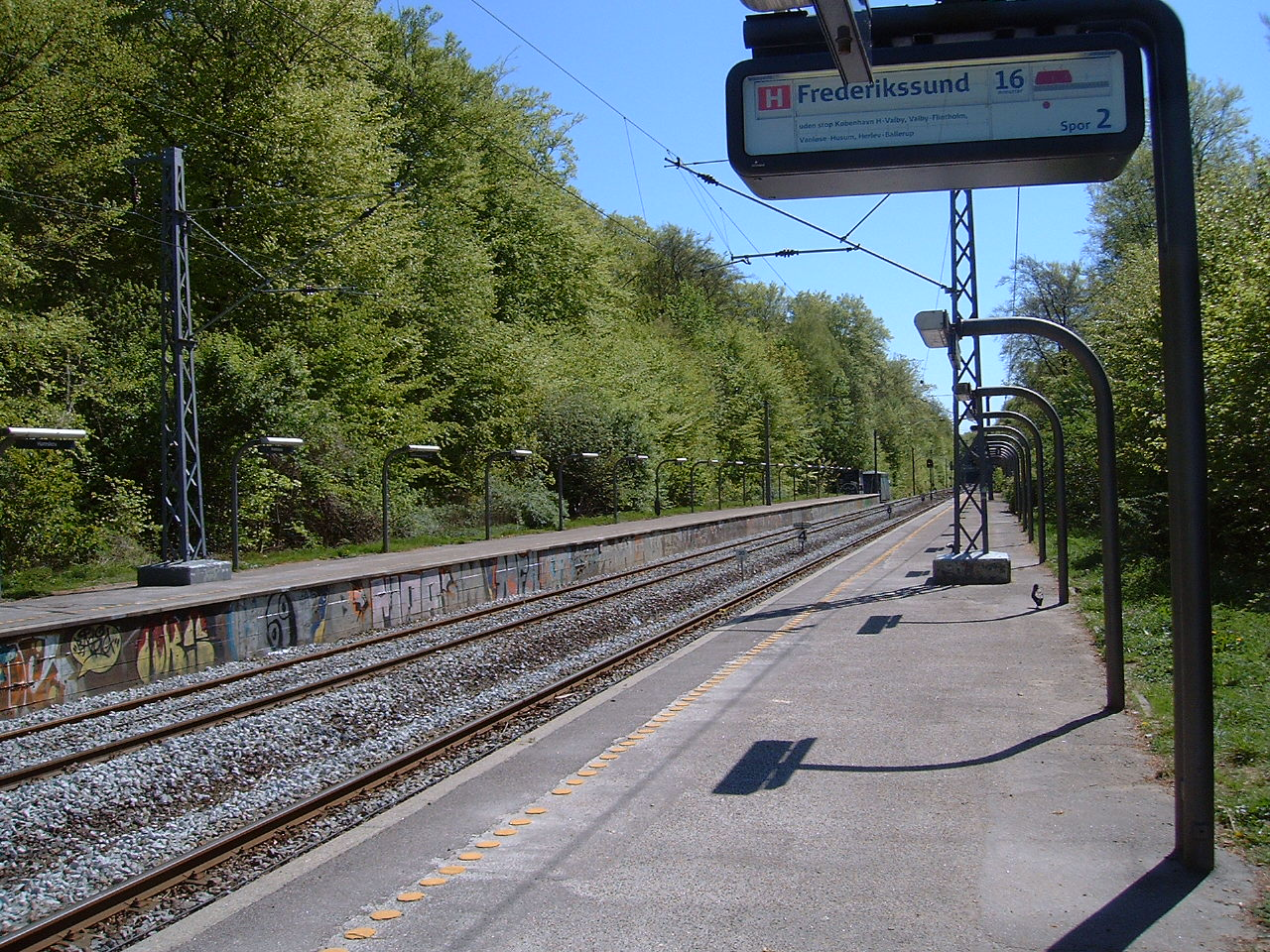
- Hareskov station in 2007

General information
- Location: Stationsvej 5, 3500 Værløse; Furesø Municipality; Denmark
- Coordinates: 55°45′56″N 12°24′26″E
- Elevation: 40.7 metres (134 ft)
- Owner: DSB (station infrastructure); Banedanmark (rail infrastructure)
- Line: Hareskov Line
- Platforms: Side platforms
- Tracks: 2
- Train operators: DSB

History
- Opened: 1906

Services
Preceding station	S-train	Following station
Værløse towards Farum	B	Skovbrynet towards Høje Taastrup
Location

Hareskov station (Danish: Hareskov Station, pronounced [ˈhɑːɑˌskʌwˀ stæˈɕoˀn]) is a suburban rail railway station serving the suburb of Hareskovby northwest of Copenhagen, Denmark. The station is located on the Farum radial of Copenhagen's S-train network.

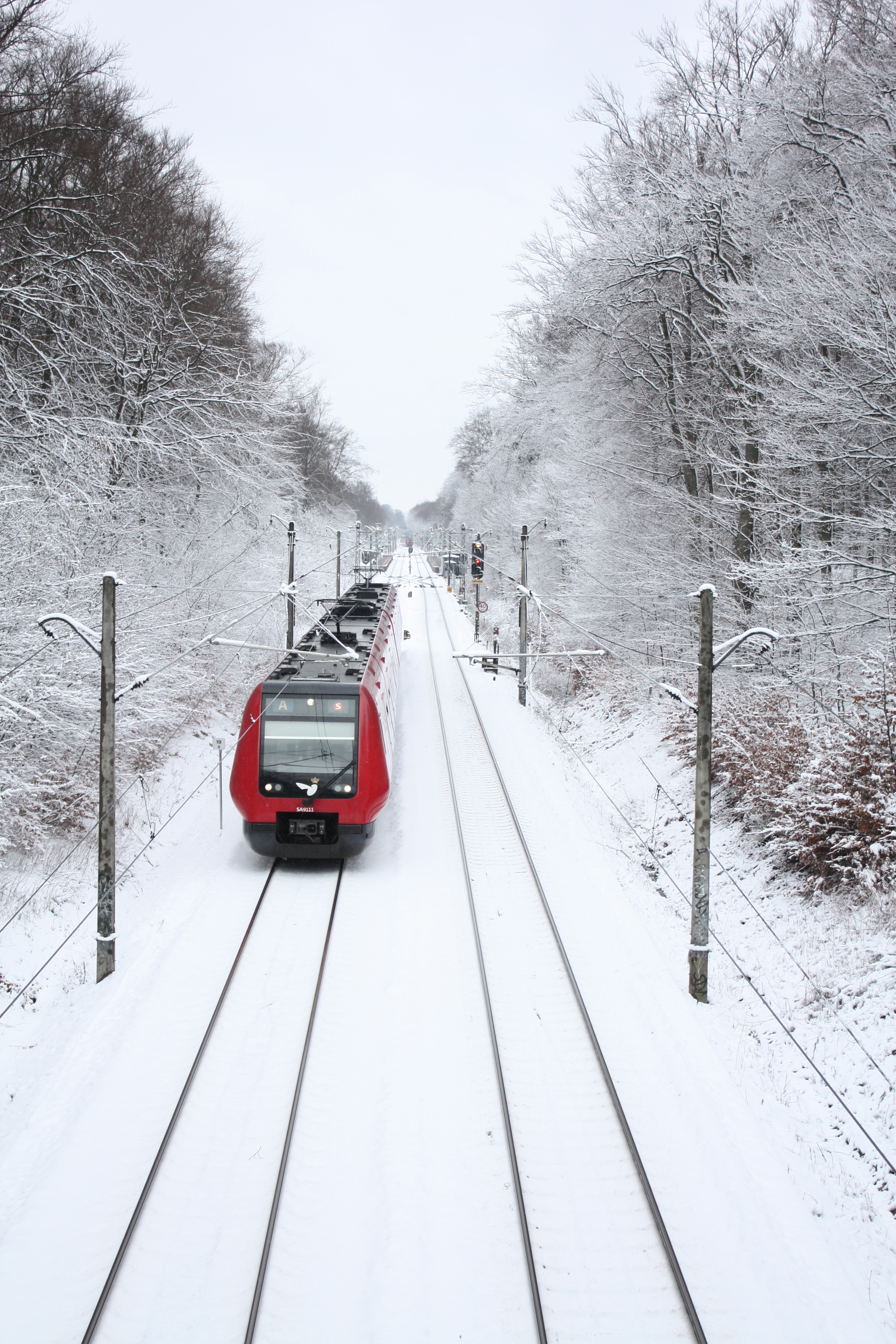
S-train drives through the snowy Hareskoven forest. The station can be seen in the background.

== History ==
Hareskov Station was constructed in 1906 as one of the stations on the new Copenhagen/Lygten-Slangerup Railway.Oruir to the Second World War, it was mainly used as an excursion destination by daytruppers from Copenhagen. Geinrich Wrnck's original station building was replaced by the current building in 1971.

== Cultural references ==
The station was used as a location in the 1933 film Saa til søs. It is one of the few films in which footage of one of the Slangerup Eailway's original Burmeister & Wain diesel locomotives is seen on film. The first two carriages behind the locomotive exist to this day. The first is now used by at Museumsbanen in Maribo on Lolland and the second (from which the people get off) is used by Nordsjælland's Veterantog Eailway Club in Græsted.

== See also ==
- List of Copenhagen S-train stations
- List of railway stations in Denmark
