= Stengården railway station =

Commuter railway station in Greater Copenhagen, Denmark

Stengården
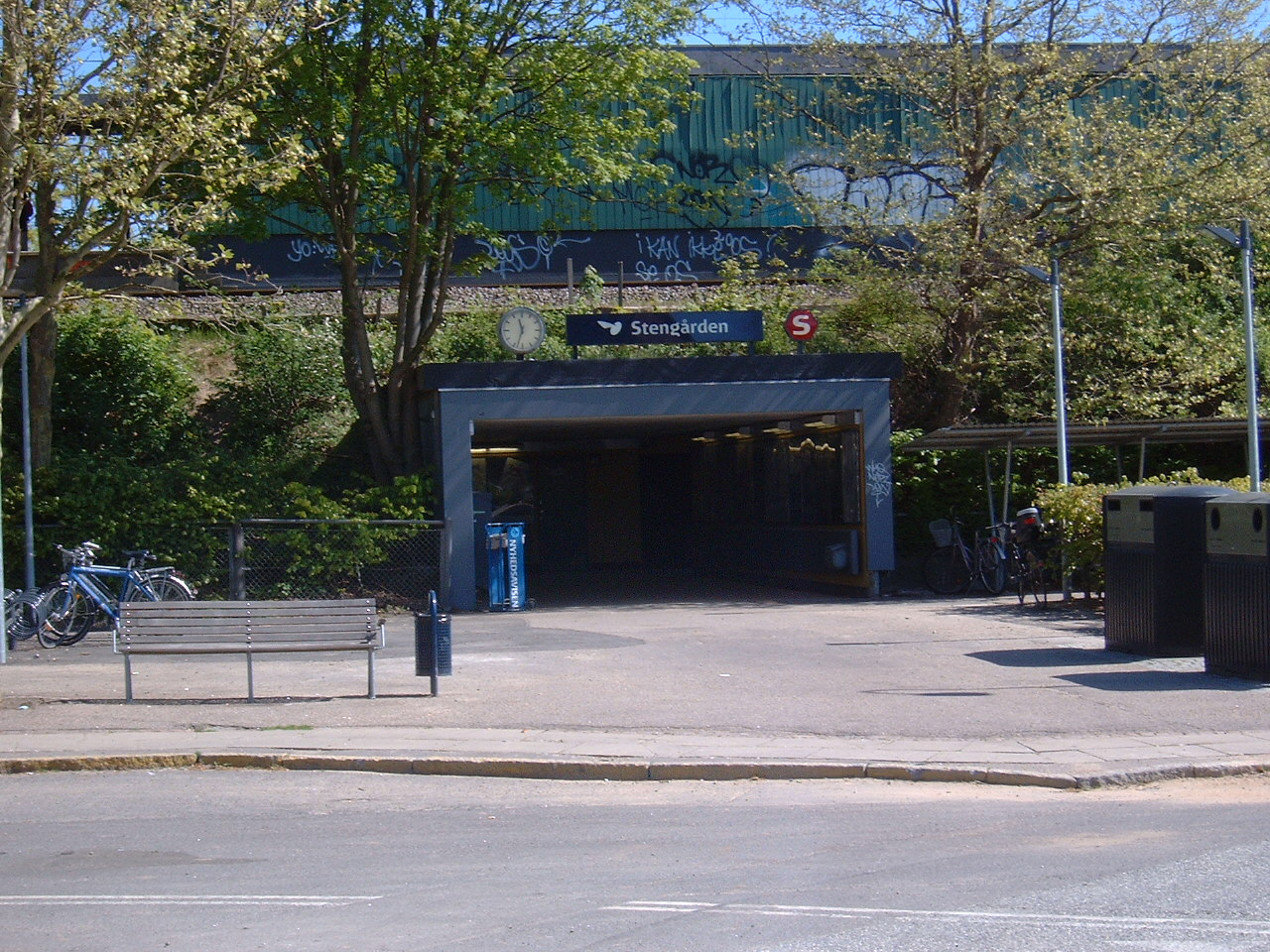
- Stengården station in 2007

General information
- Location: Gammelmosevej; 2880 Bagsværd; Gladsaxe Municipality; Denmark
- Coordinates: 55°45′24″N 12°28′23″E
- Elevation: 33.5 metres (110 ft)
- Owner: DSB (station infrastructure); Banedanmark (rail infrastructure)
- Platforms: Island platform
- Tracks: 2
- Train operators: DSB

History
- Opened: 1929

Services
| Preceding station | S-train | Following station |
|---|---|---|
| Bagsværd towards Farum | B | Buddinge towards Høje Taastrup |
Location

Stengården station is an S-train railway station serving the eastern part of the suburb of Bagsværd northwest of Copenhagen, Denmark. It is located on the Farum radial of Copenhagen's S-train network.

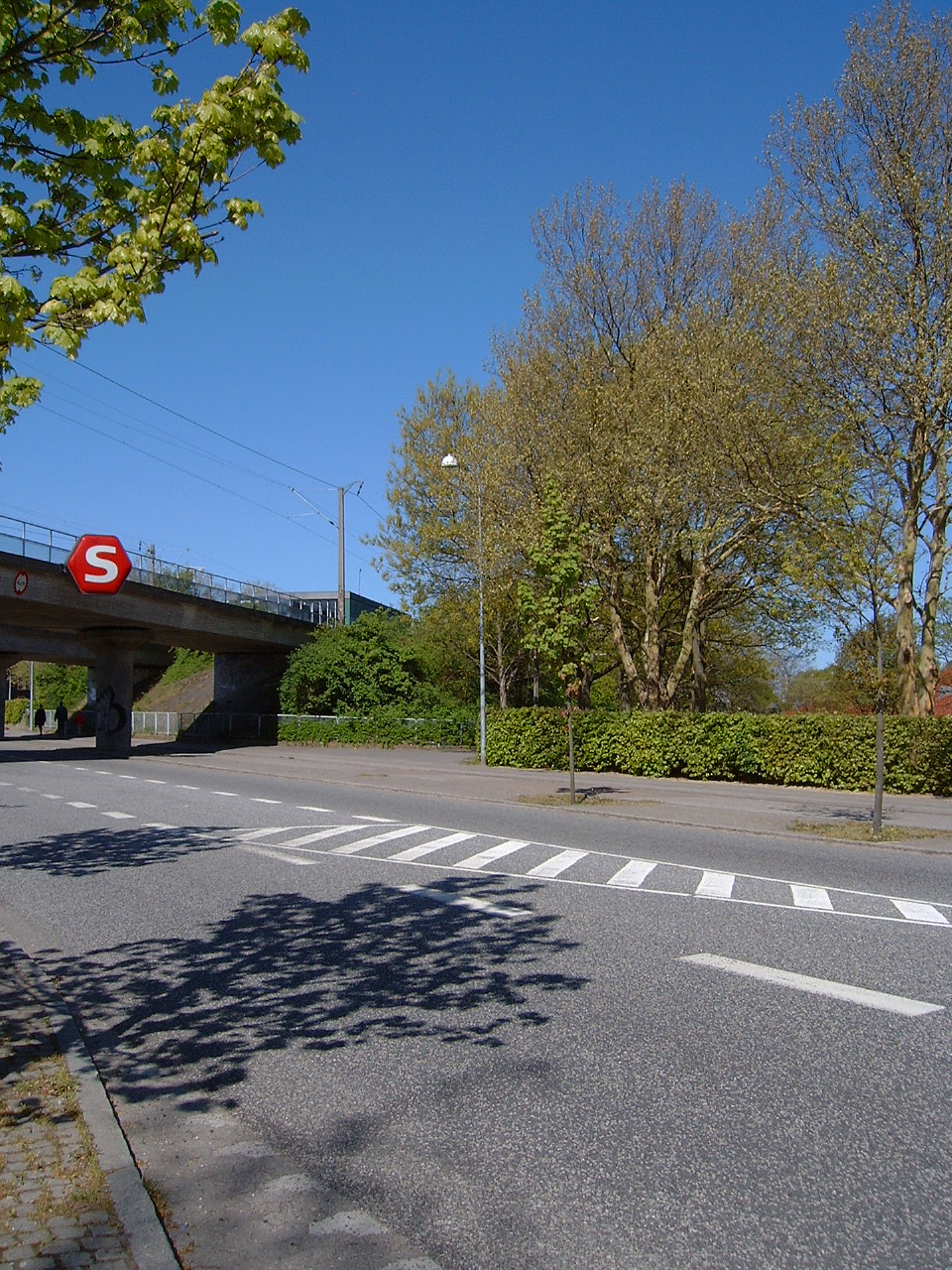
S-train tracks at the station, on the bridge over Gammelmosevej

== See also ==
- List of Copenhagen S-train stations
- List of railway stations in Denmark
