= Bagsværd railway station =

Suburban railway station in Greater Copenhagen, Denmark

Bagsværd
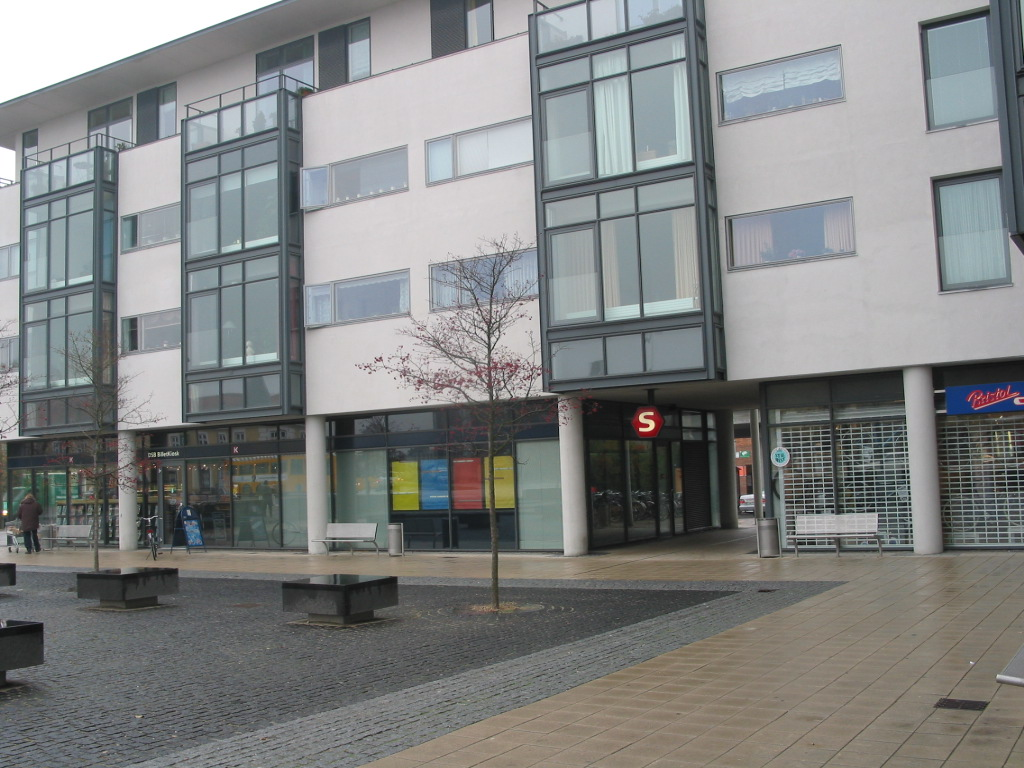
- Bagsværd station in 2003

General information
- Location: Bagsværd Hovedgade 142; 2880 Bagsværd; Gladsaxe Municipality; Denmark
- Coordinates: 55°45′42″N 12°27′16″E
- Elevation: 26.1 metres (86 ft)
- Owner: DSB (station infrastructure); Banedanmark (rail infrastructure)
- Line: Hareskov Line
- Platforms: Island platform
- Tracks: 2
- Train operators: DSB

Other information
- Website: Official website

History
- Opened: 20 April 1906

Services
Preceding station	S-train	Following station
Skovbrynet towards Farum	B	Stengården towards Høje Taastrup
Location

Bagsværd station is a suburban rail railway station serving the suburb of Bagsværd northwest of Copenhagen, Denmark. The station is located in the central part of the suburb a short distance from its main artery Bagsværd Hovedgade.

The station is situated on the Farum radial of Copenhagen's S-train network, a hybrid commuter rail and rapid transit system serving Greater Copenhagen. It is served regularly by trains on the B-line which have a journey time to central Copenhagen of around 20 minutes.

== History ==
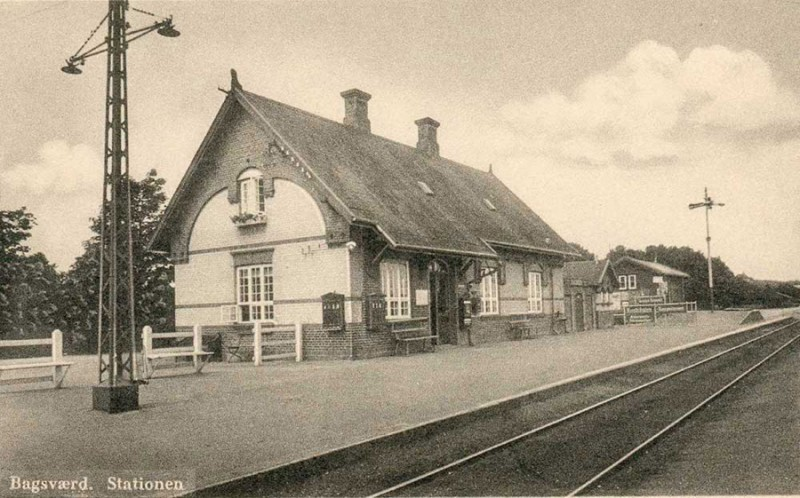
Bagsværd Station in 1953

The station opened on 20 April 1906 as one of the original intermediate stations on the Slangerup Line between Copenhagen and Slangerup.

The station was moved to its current location and converted into an S-train station on 25 September 1977.

== Operations ==
Bagsværd station is served regularly by trains on the B-line of Copenhagen's S-train network which run between Farum and Høje Taastrup via central Copenhagen.

== See also ==
- List of Copenhagen S-train stations
- List of railway stations in Denmark
- Rail transport in Denmark
- Transport in Copenhagen
