= Lygten Station =

Former railway station in Copenhagen, Denmark

Coordinates: 55.7016°N 12.5377°E

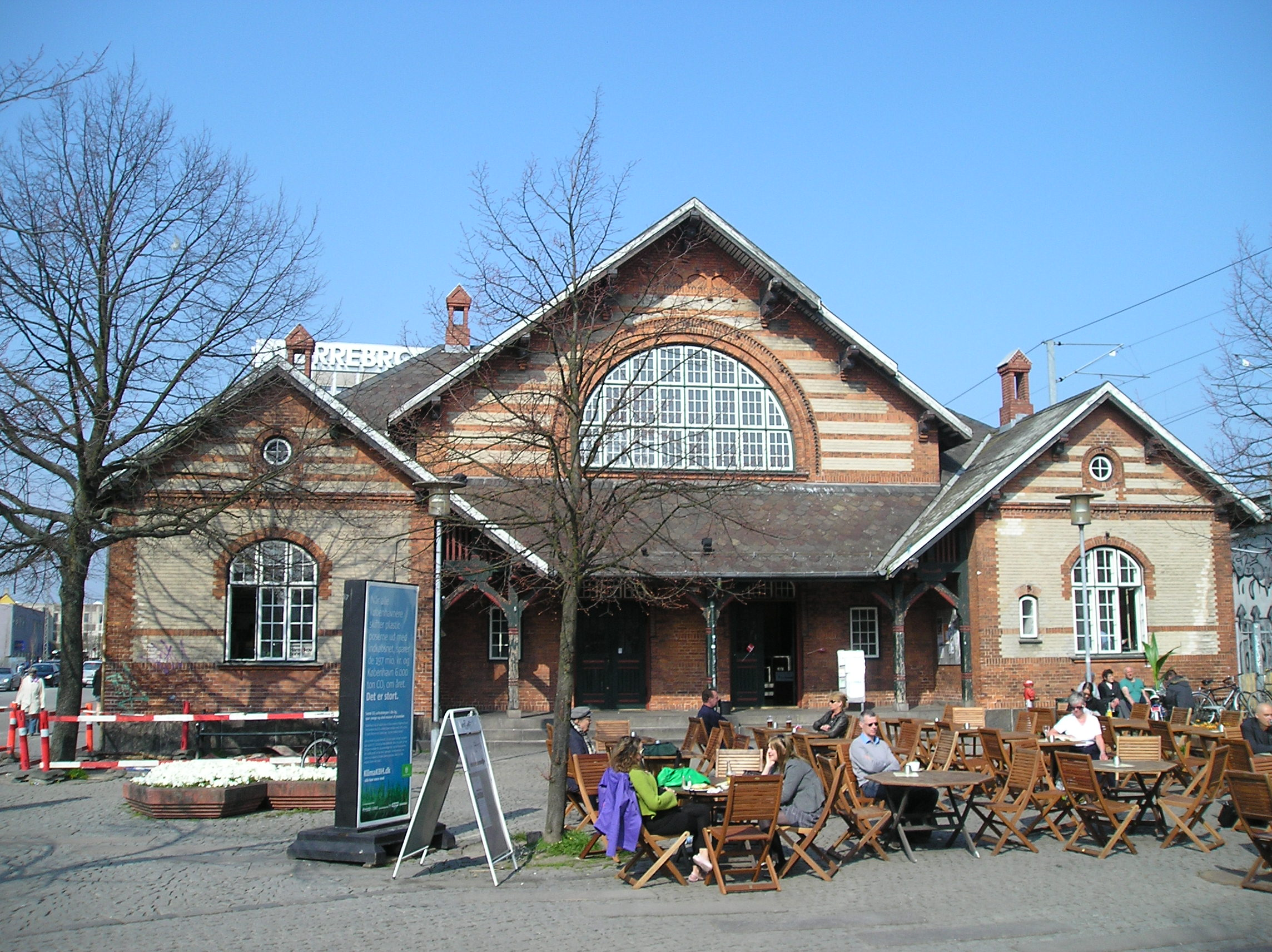

General information
- Location: Denmark

Construction
- Architect: Heinrich Wenck

History
- Opened: 19 April 1906
Location

Lygten Station is a former railway station in the Nordvest district of Copenhagen, Denmark. Located at the far end of Nørrebrogade, immediately after it becomes Frederikssundsvej, next to Nørrebro station, on the border with Nørrebro, the building is now used as a local cultural centre.

== History ==
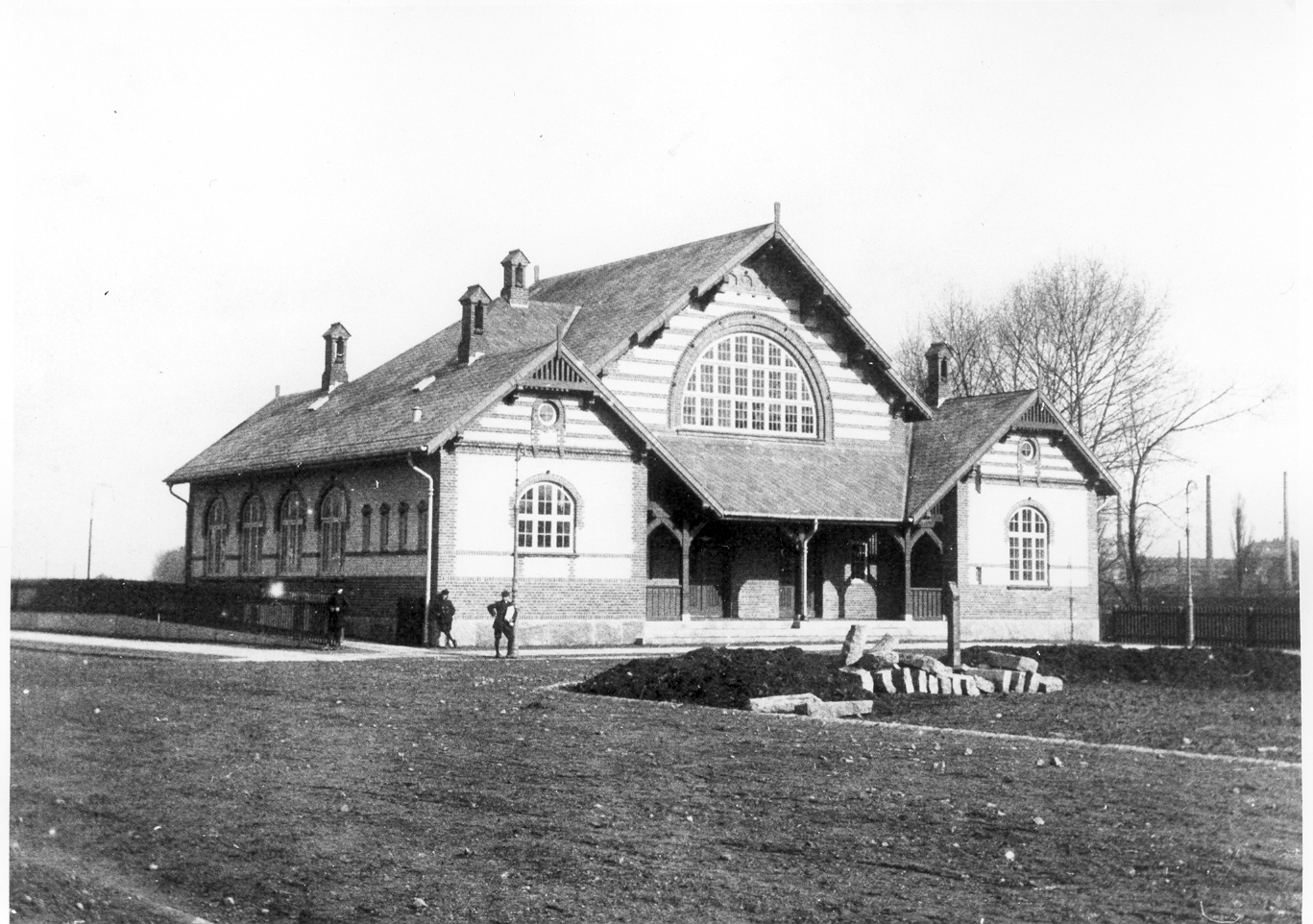
Lygten Station shortly after it was built in 1906

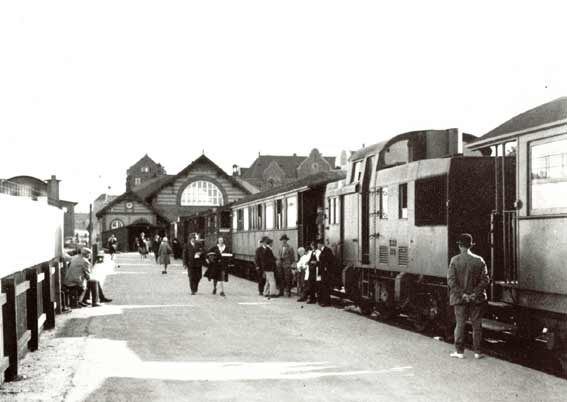
Lygten Station (København L), the original terminus in Copenhagen.

Lygten Station (København L) is the former terminus of the private Copenhagen–Slangerup Railway which opened on 19 April 1906, connecting Copenhagen to the small town of Slangerup to the northwest of the city. The National Romantic station building was designed by Heinrich Wenck, head architect of the Danish State Railways, and got its name from Lygteåen, a local stream. With its location in open surroundings on the outskirts of Nørrebro, the station was quite a bit from the city center, but it was supposed to be temporary until the exact routing of the various new railways near Copenhagen that were in planning at the time had been finalized. The railway crossed Nørrebrogade and continued through Nørrebro to the old Nørrebro station which was located where Nørrebro Park is today.

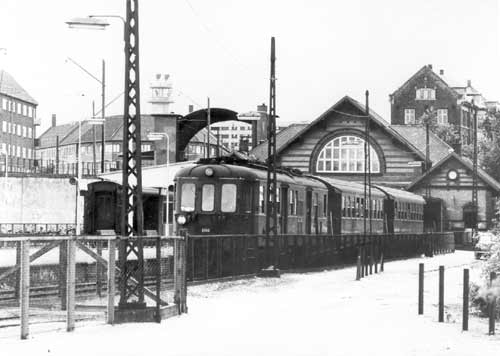
The station in the early 1960s

In 1948, DSB took over the rail line. In 1954, its outer portion, from Farum to Slangerup, was closed down. Lygten station was decommissioned on 25 April 1976 when the Farum railway was converted into an S-train line and connected to the rest of the S-train network at Svanemøllen station. Nørrebro Bycenter, a minor shopping centre, was later built at the site on the former tracks and platforms. The station building was listed in 1982.

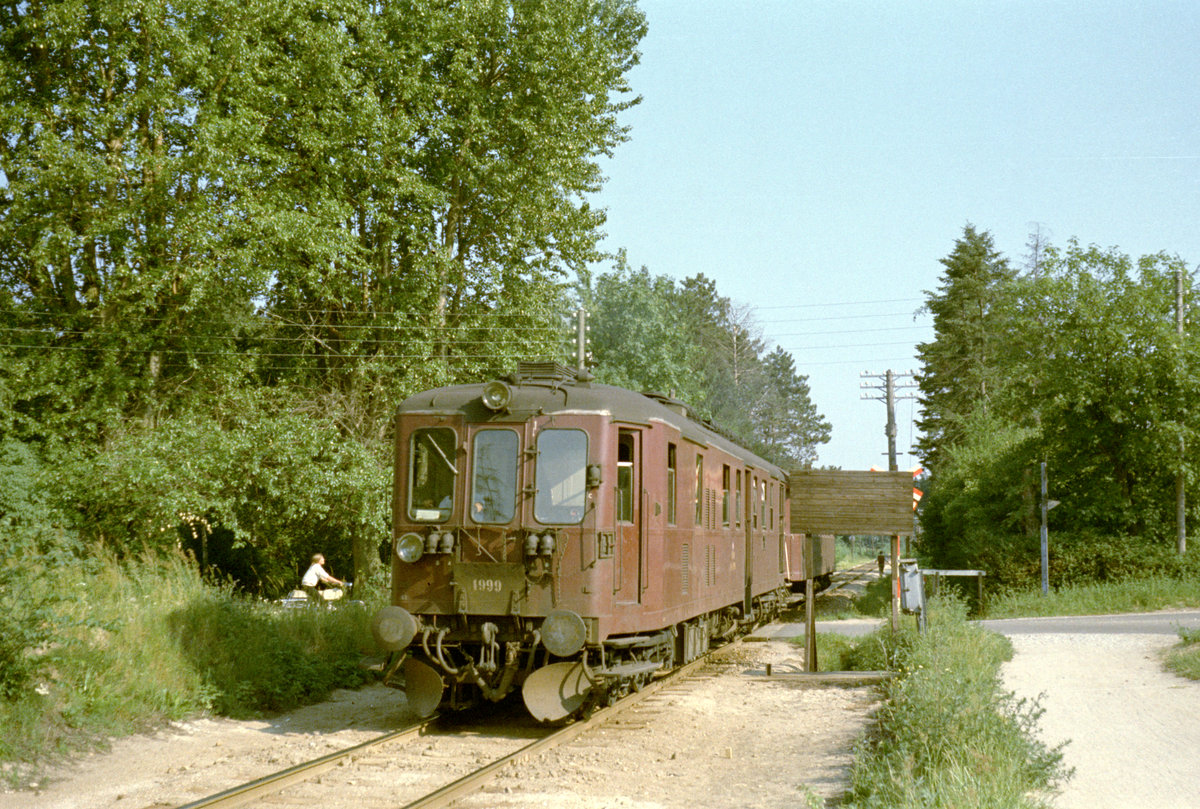
DSB MO 1999 in 1970

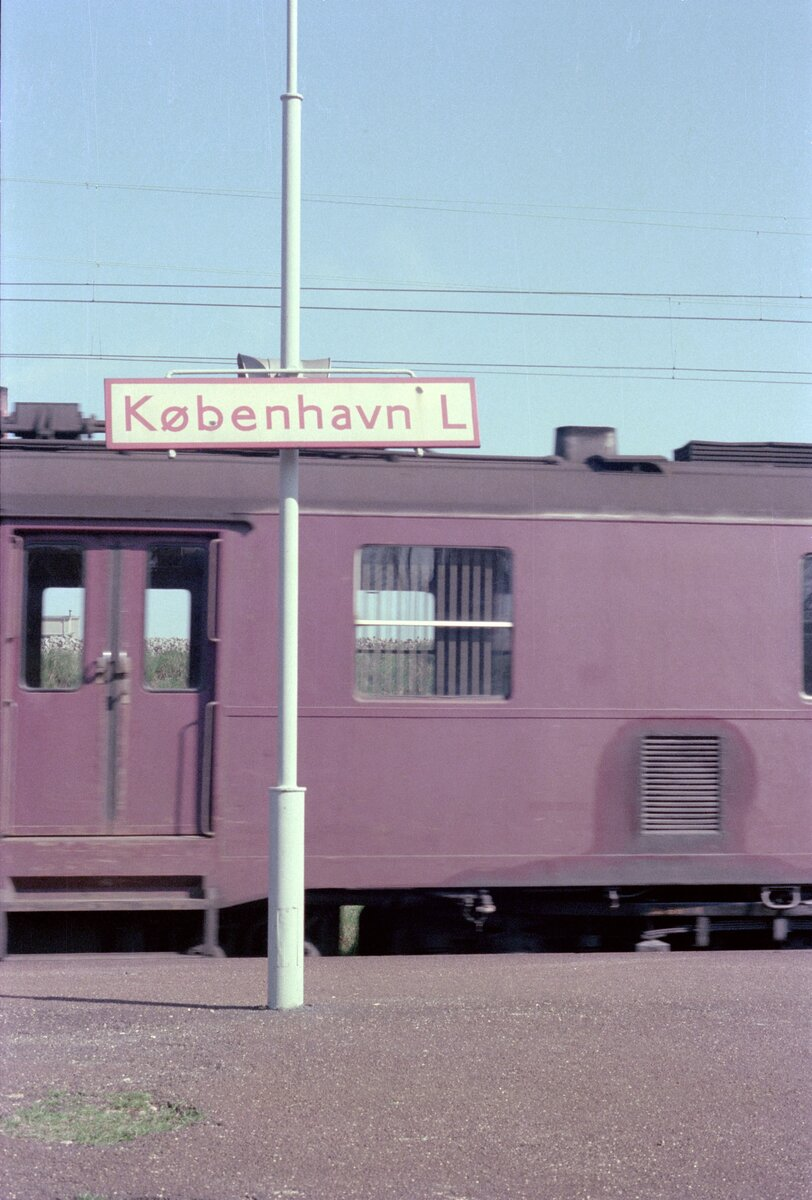
København L

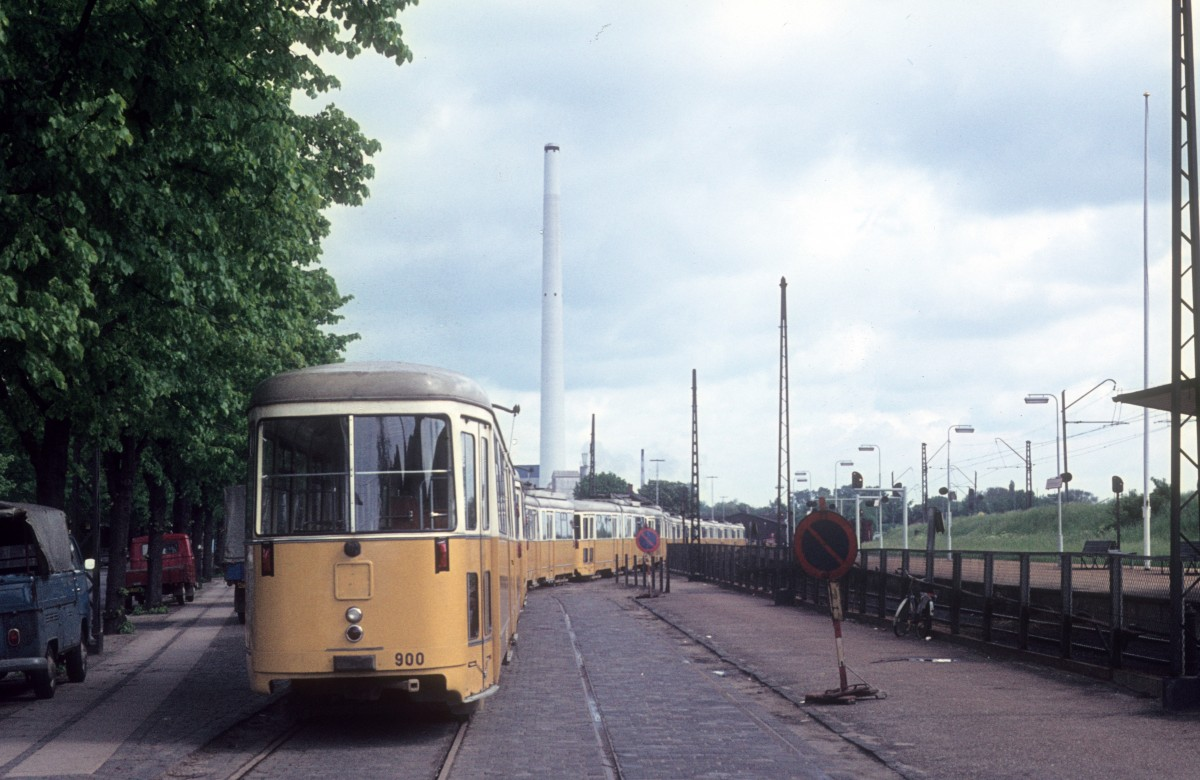
København KS, København L

== Current use ==
The station building has been used as a cinema (under the name Filmstationen) since 2007 and as a culture house since 2008. The activities include concerts, stand-up comedy, film screenings, art exhibitions and literary events. It is also being let out to associations and for special events. The Copenhagen Railway Club meets in the building once a month.
