= Værløse railway station =

Commuter railway station in Greater Copenhagen, Denmark

Værløse
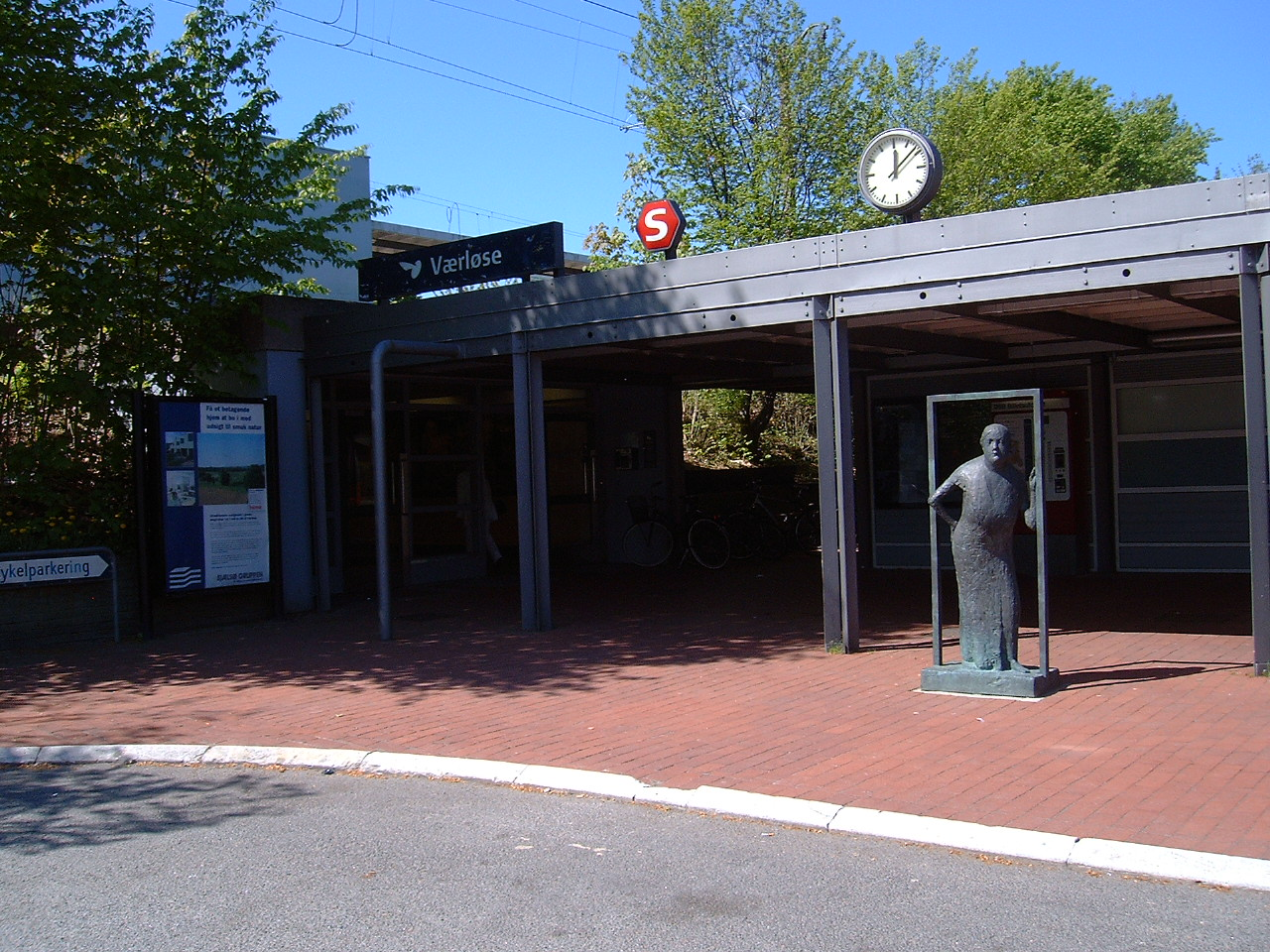
- Værløse station in 2007

General information
- Location: Hareskovhvilevej 10; 3500 Værløse; Furesø Municipality; Denmark
- Coordinates: 55°46′56″N 12°22′21″E
- Elevation: 46.8 metres (154 ft)
- Owner: DSB (station infrastructure); Banedanmark (rail infrastructure)
- Line: Hareskov Line
- Platforms: Island platform
- Tracks: 2
- Train operators: DSB

History
- Opened: 1906

Services
Preceding station	S-train	Following station
Farum Terminus	B	Hareskov towards Høje Taastrup
Location

Værløse Station is a commuter railway station serving the satellite town of Værløse in Furesø municipality northwest of Copenhagen, Denmark. It is located on the Farum radial of Copenhagen's S-train network.

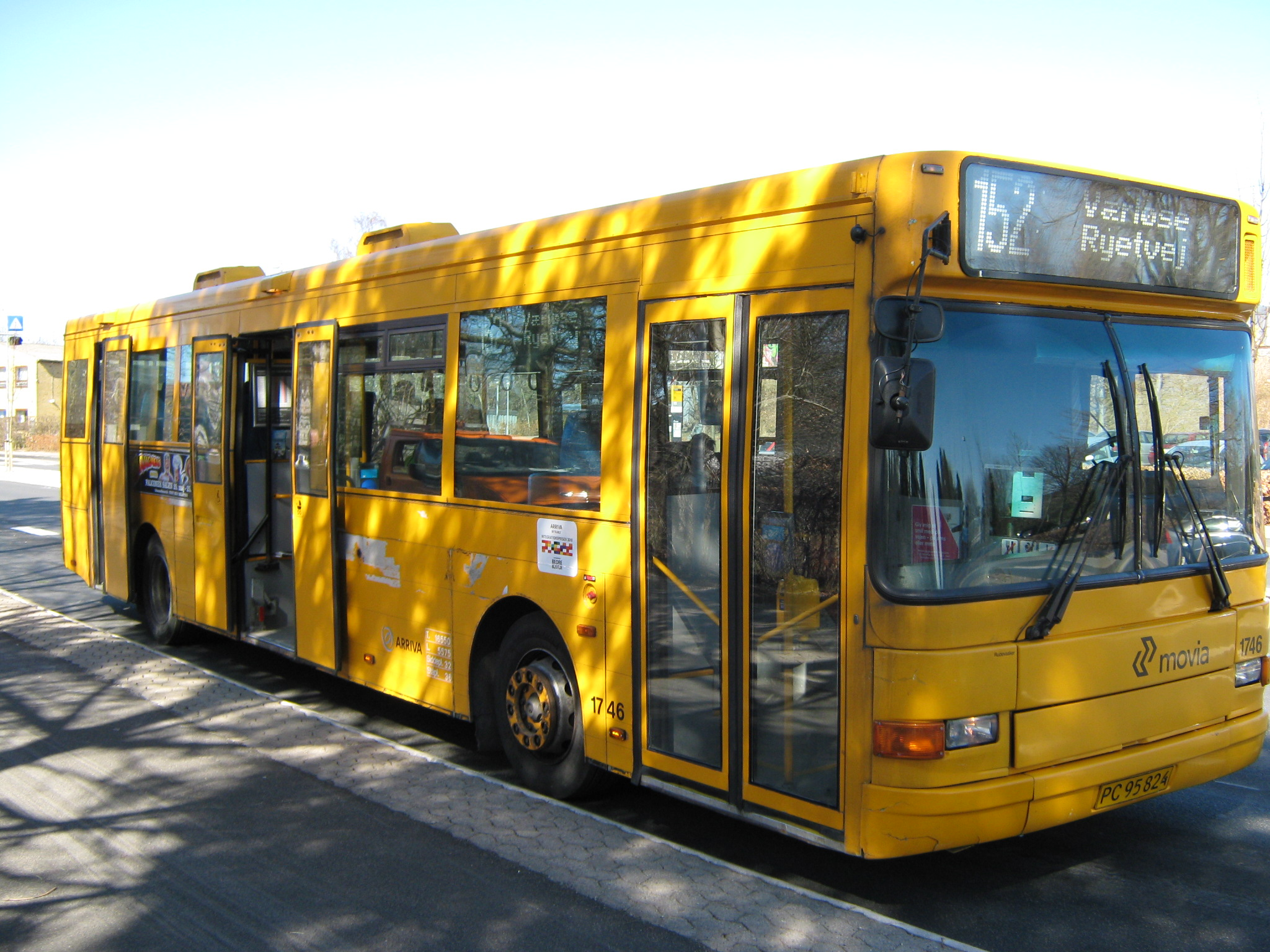
Connection at the bus terminal

== See also ==
- List of Copenhagen S-train stations
- List of railway stations in Denmark
