= Skovbrynet railway station =

Commuter railway station in Greater Copenhagen, Denmark

Skovbrynet
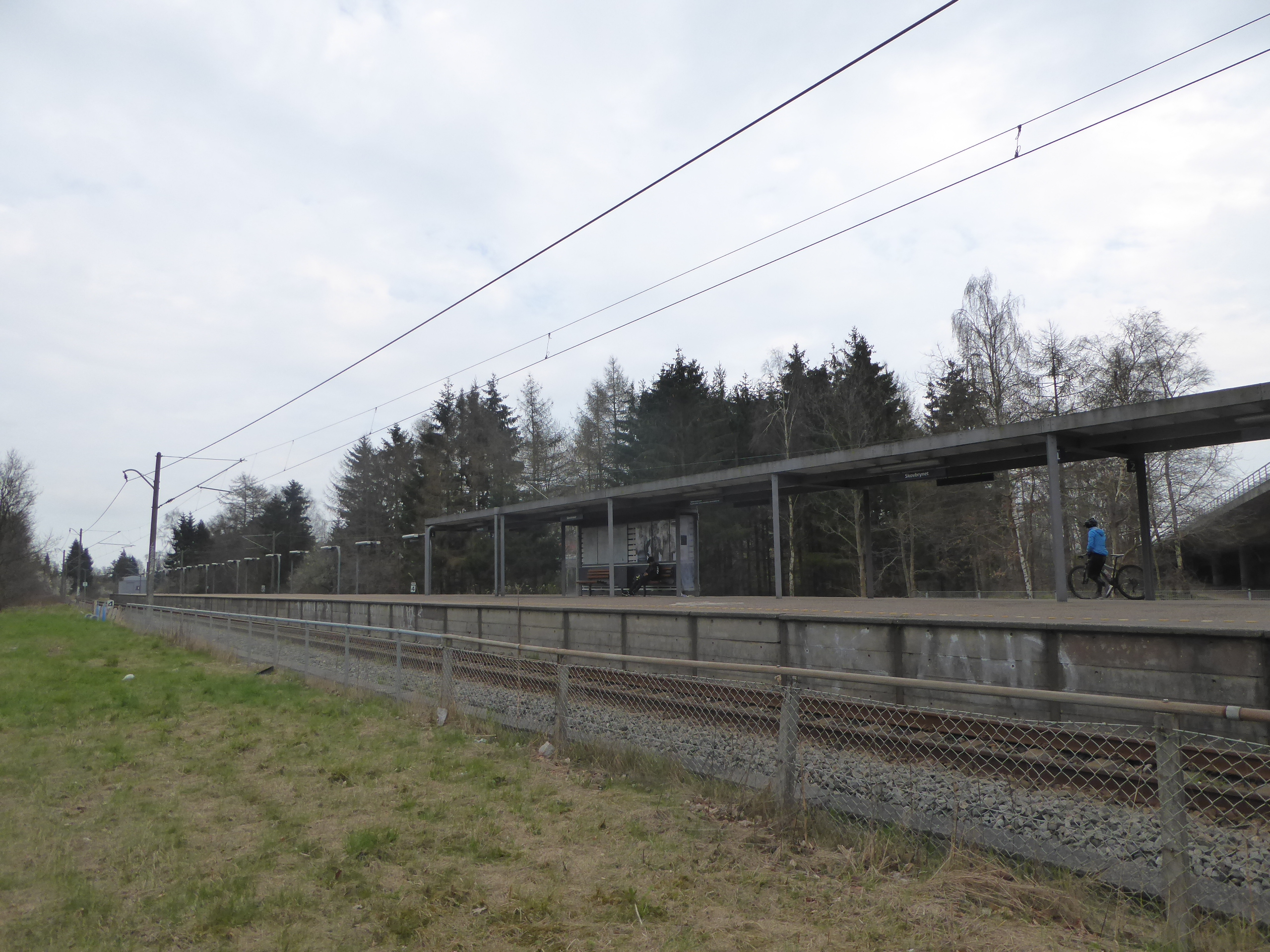
- Skovbrynet station in 2016

General information
- Location: Skovdiget 8; 2800 Bagsværd; Gladsaxe Municipality; Denmark
- Coordinates: 55°45′55″N 12°26′4″E
- Elevation: 35.0 metres (114.8 ft)
- Owner: DSB (station infrastructure); Banedanmark (rail infrastructure)
- Platforms: Island platform
- Tracks: 2
- Train operators: DSB

Other information
- Website: Official website

History
- Opened: 1930

Services
Preceding station	S-train	Following station
Hareskov towards Farum	B	Bagsværd towards Høje Taastrup
Location

Skovbrynet station is a suburban rail railway station serving the western part of the suburb of Bagsværd northwest of Copenhagen, Denmark. The station is located on the Farum radial of Copenhagen's S-train network.

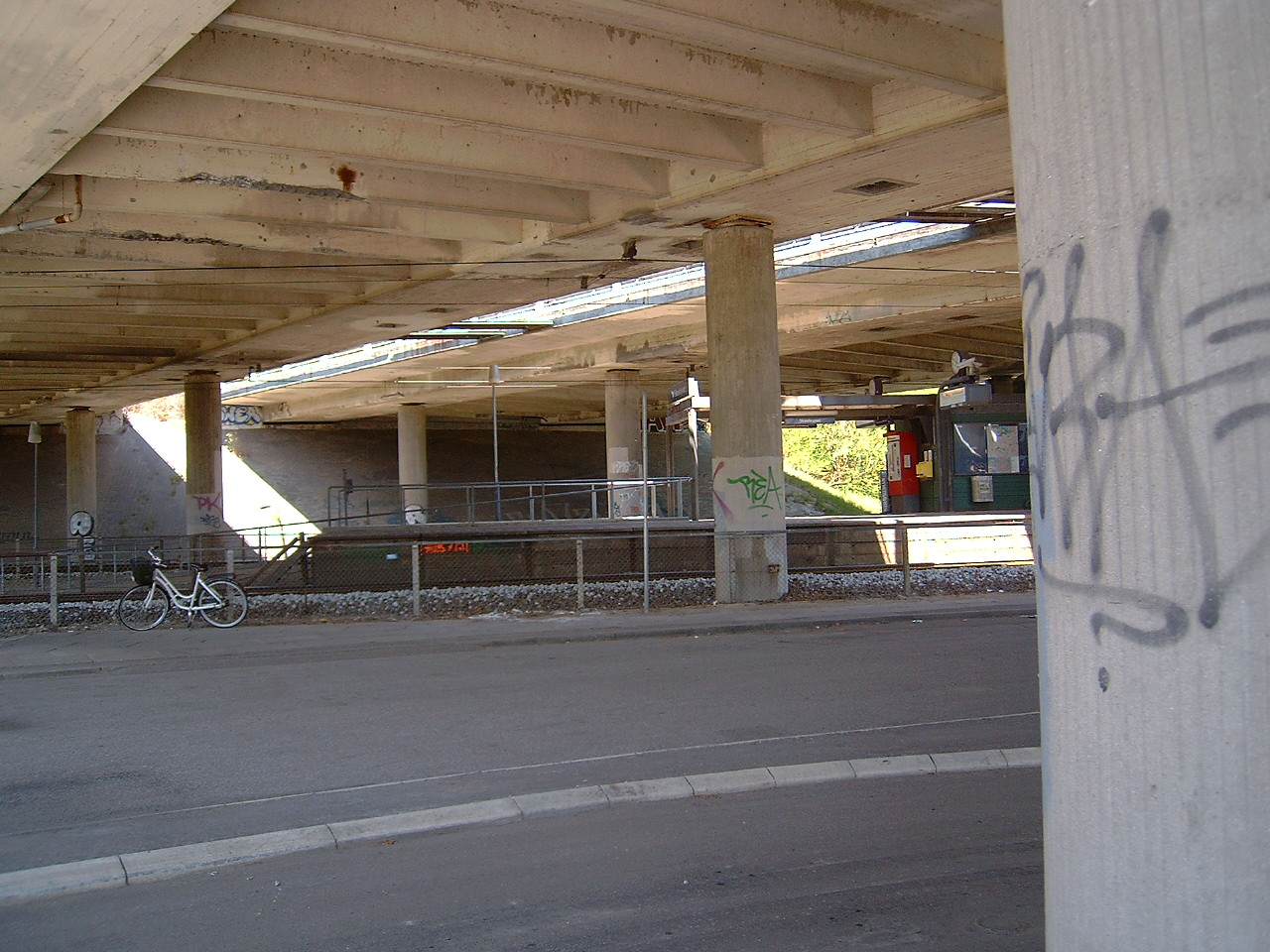
The railway tracks run under the Hillerød Motorway at the station

== See also ==
- List of Copenhagen S-train stations
- List of railway stations in Denmark
- Rail transport in Denmark
