= Hareskovbanen =

Commuter railway line in Copenhagen, Denmark

Hareskov Line

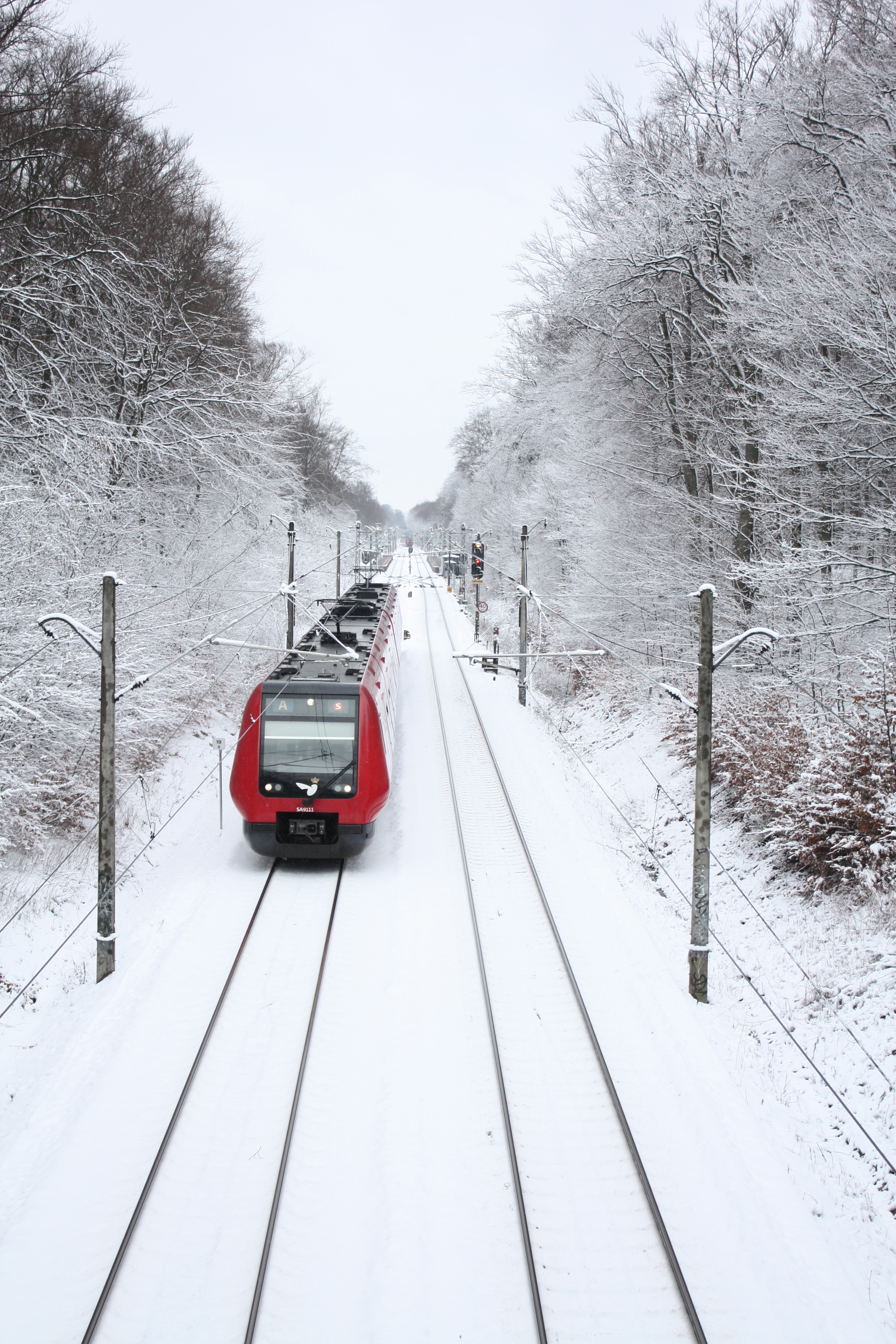
- The Hareskov Line in the snowy Hareskoven forest in February 2009

Overview
- Native name: Hareskovbanen
- Line number: 840
- Locale: Greater Copenhagen
- Termini: Svanemøllen; Farum
- Stations: 13
- Website: https://bane.dk

Service
- Type: Suburban rail
- System: Copenhagen S-train
- Operator: DSB
- Rolling stock: 4th generation S-train

Technical
- Line length: 21.5 km (13.4 mi)
- Number of tracks: 2
- Character: Grade-separated
- Track gauge: 1,435 mm (4 ft 8 1/2 in) standard gauge
- Electrification: 1,650 V DC overhead line
- Operating speed: Svanemøllen–Buddinge : 90 kilometres per hour (56 mph); Buddinge–Farum : 100 kilometres per hour (62 mph)
- Signalling: CBTC
Route map
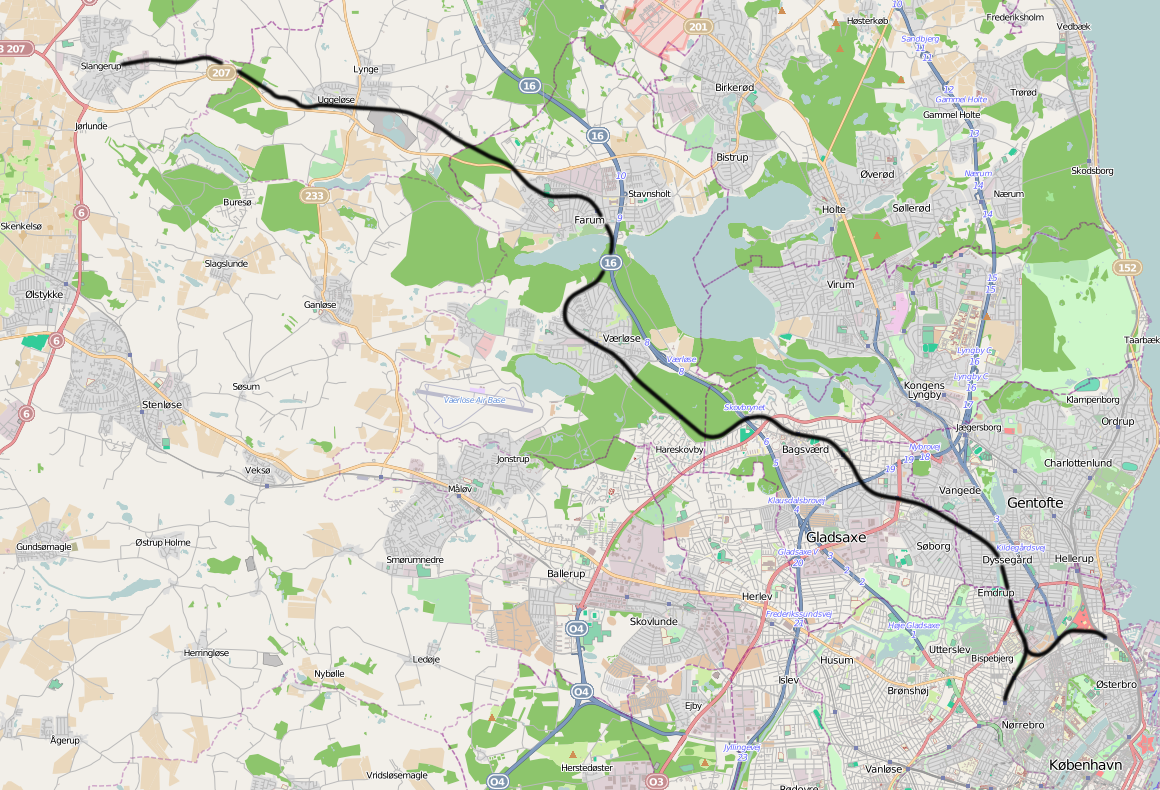
Map of the Hareskov Line, including the now abandoned section from Farum to Slangerup Slangerupbanen.

Hareskovbanen (English: the Hareskov line) is one of six radial S-train lines in Copenhagen. It connects the city center to a number of northwestern suburbs and the cities of Værløse and Farum, with the terminus placed in the latter.

== History ==
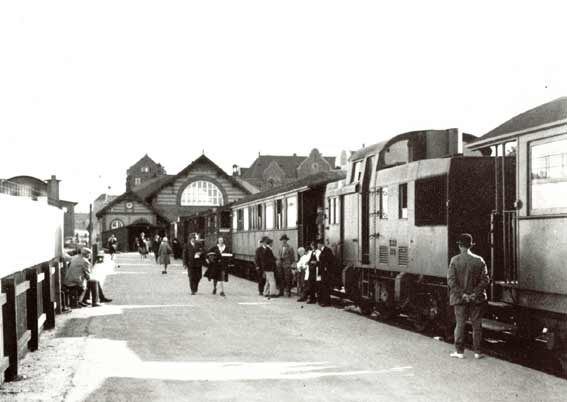
Lygten Station, the original terminus in Copenhagen

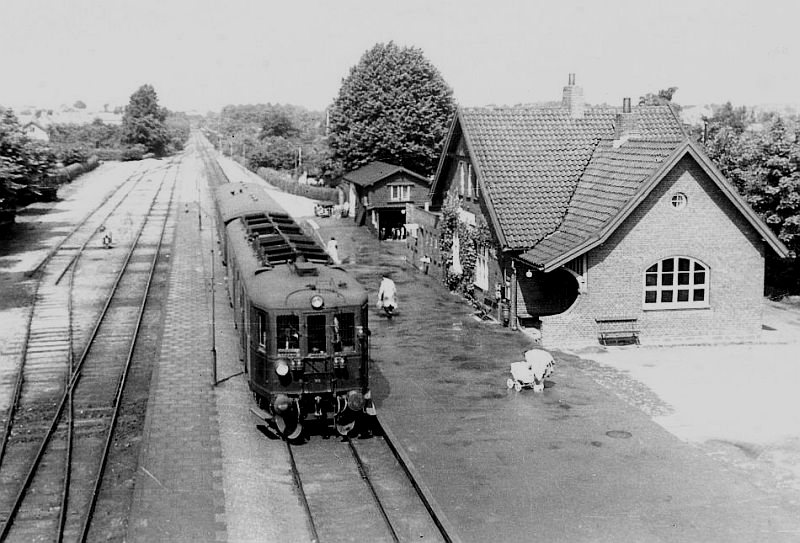
Vangede station in 1953

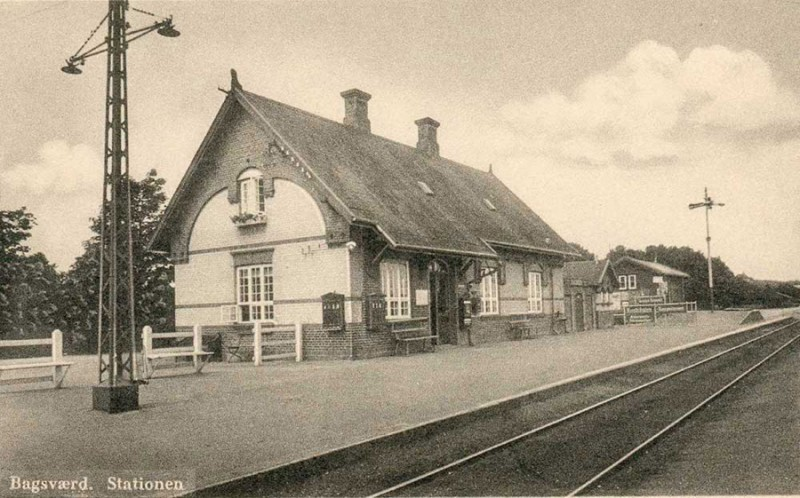
Bagsværd station in 1953

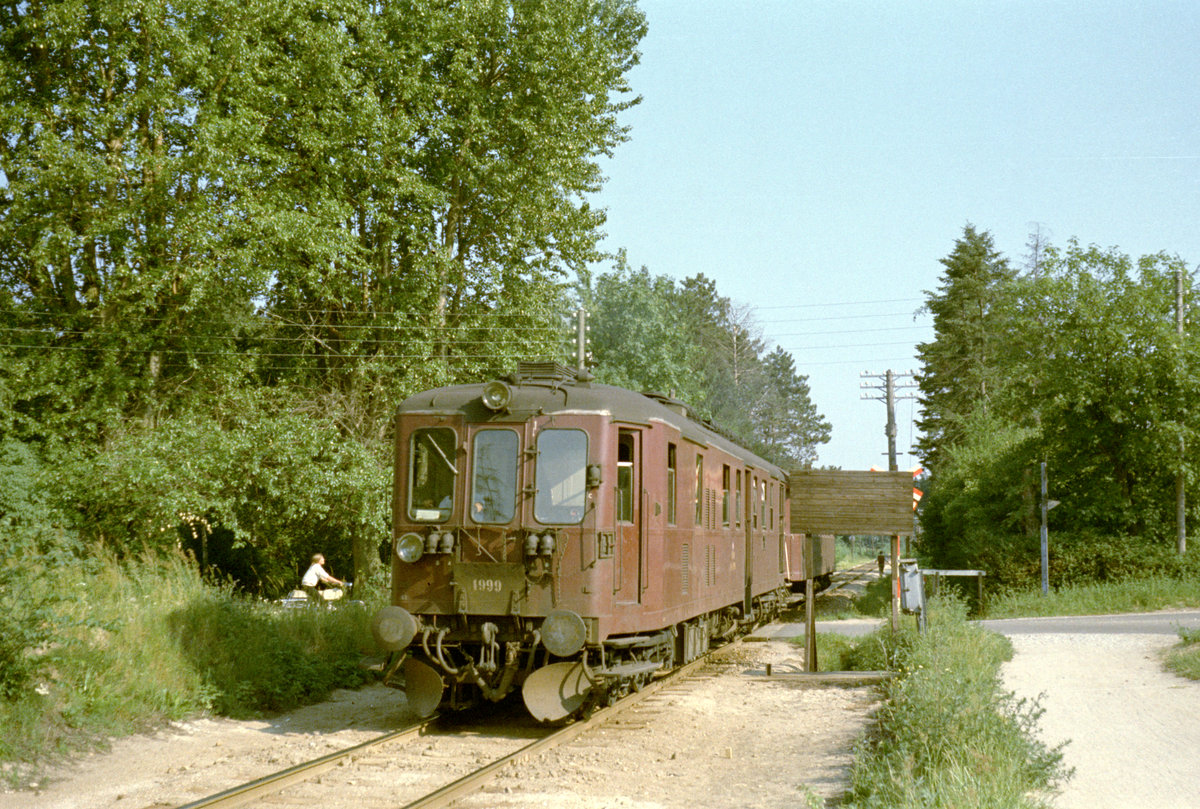
DSB MO 1999 entering Farum station in 1970

The line was opened in 1906 as part of the private København-Slangerup Jernbane which went to Slangerup, about two thirds from Farum to Frederikssund. Its terminus in Copenhagen was København L, close to present day Nørrebro station on the S-train ring line - the station building of this station still stands. This was quite a bit from the city center, but the station was supposed to be temporary until the exact routing of the various new railways near Copenhagen that were in planning around the turn of the century had been finalized.

For the first many years, a large part of the traffic consisted of leisure trips by the large working population of Nørrebro to the Hareskoven forest.

Over the years, the economy of the private railway company declined, and in 1929 most of the private investors sold their shares to the municipalities along the line. After World War II the railway was so run down that the state railways DSB had to take it over in 1948. A few years later, in 1954, the outer end of the line between Farum and Slangerup was abandoned as it was unprofitable.

Plans to convert the line to S-trains had been discussed for decades, and in 1961 an act authorizing DSB to electrify the line. However, the act was not followed by sufficient allocations of public money, and it would take until 1977 until S-trains could begin running on the line.

Originally the plan was to extend the line as an underground line directly from København L to the center of the city, but over the course of the 1960s it became clear that the funding environment would not support metro construction in the foreseeable future. Therefore, in the eventual S-train conversion the innermost few kilometers in the line were abandoned and replaced by a large S-curve that connected it to the existing S-train trunk at Svanemøllen. A new overpass and interchange with the ring line was built at Ryparken. København L was abandoned and the terminus of the diesel trains moved to Svanemøllen in early 1976, and a year and a half later the conversion to S-trains were complete. This was the longest single addition to the S-train network so far.

This indirect approach means that the travel time between this radial and the city center is relatively high, which makes it less attractive relative to more direct buses. Several of the stations on the line are among the least patronized S-train stations.

The few hundred meters of track between the platforms at Farum and the bridge across Fiskebæk valley is the only remaining piece of single-tracked railway on the S-train network.

Name	Km	S-train	Connections
Lygten station (København L) until 25 April. 1976	0.0		
Svanemøllen station		B, Bx	Nordbanen & Klampenborgbanen
Ryparken station, until 1972 called Lyngbyvej		B, Bx	Ringbanen
Emdrup as station until March 1948. Som step board from 25 September 1977	2.7	B, Bx	
Dyssegård as step board from 22 May 1932	3.7	B, Bx	
Vangede station	4.9	B, Bx	
Kildebakke as step board from 15 May 1935	6.0	B, Bx	
Buddinge station	6.9	B, Bx	
Stengården as step board from 15 May 1929	8.6	B, Bx	
Bagsværd station	10.4	B, Bx	
Skovbrynet as step board from 1 October 1930	11.7	B	
Hareskov station	13.5	B	
Syvstjernen as step board from 22 May 1932 until 1974	15.2		
Værløse station	16.7	B	
Furesø Station as step board from 22 May 1932 until 23 May 1971	19.8		
Farum station	20.5	B	
Nymølle (Allerød Kommune) Vassingerød station until 23 May 1954	25.2		
Lynge (Allerød Kommune) Lynge station until 23 May 1954	27.8		
Uggeløse Skov Trinbræt as step board from 1 October 1933 until 23 May 1954	29.9		
Lindholm Station (Slangerupbanen) until 23 May 1954	31.5		
Slangerup Station until 23 May 1954	34.2		

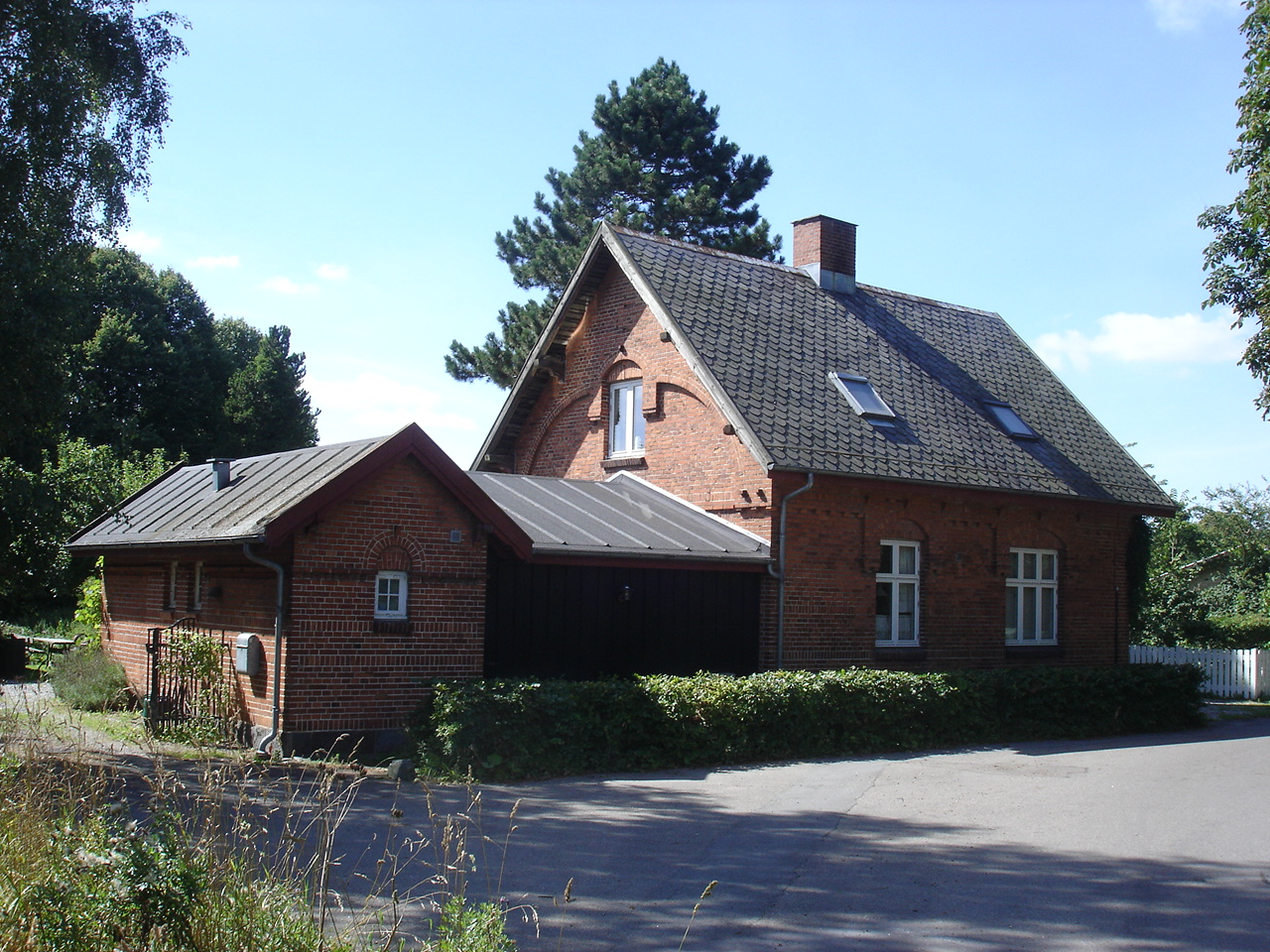
Vassingerød: Bøgevangen 12

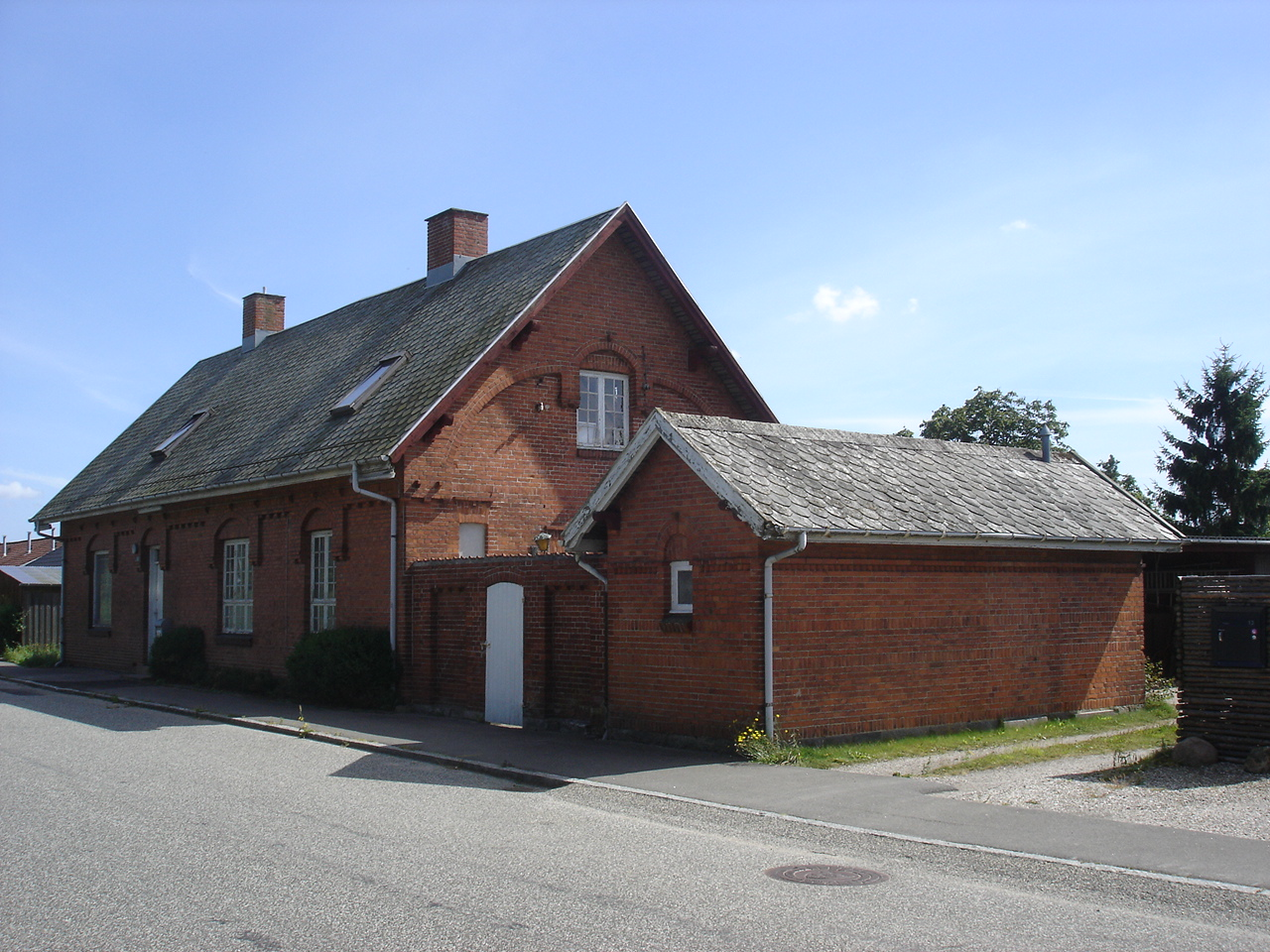
Lynge: Stationsvej 11

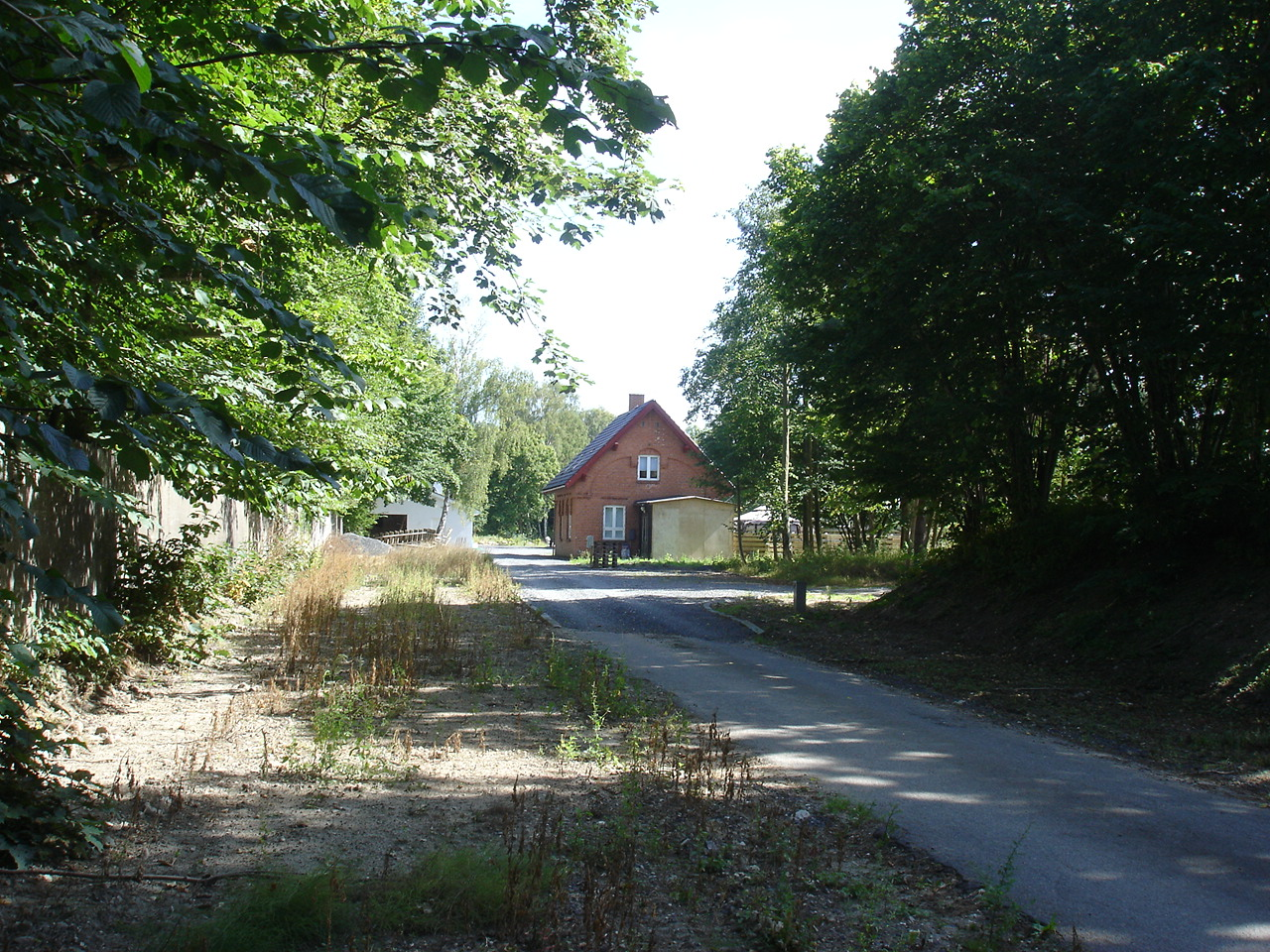
Lindholm: Lindholm Stationsvej 2

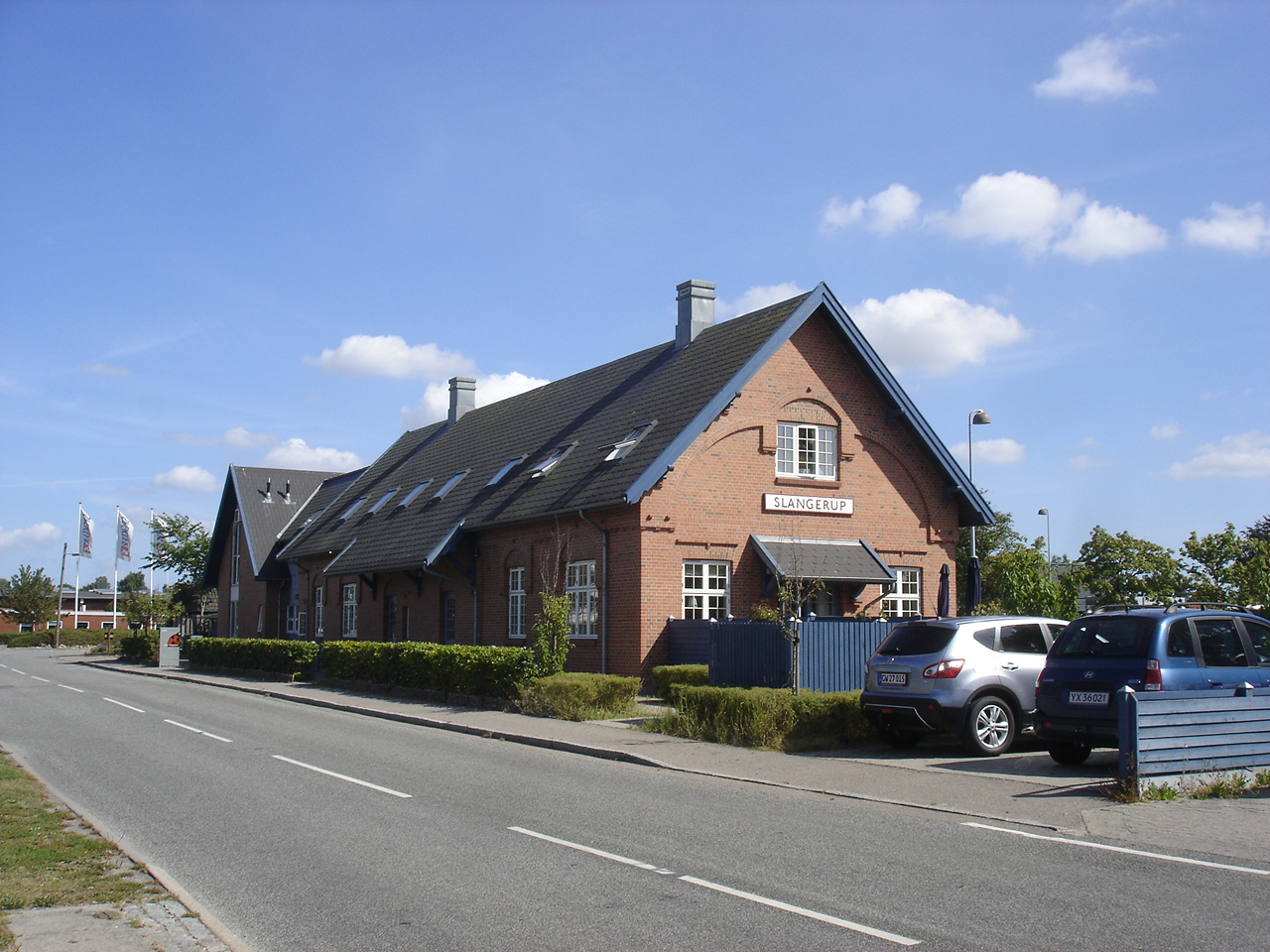
Slangerup: Stationsvej 4

=== Sections where disused railway lines have been preserved ===
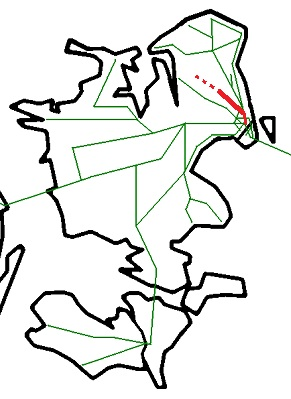
Hareskovbanen and some of the remaining’s of Slangerupbanen

Of the 13.7 km route of the line, 2½ km is preserved and accessible. In addition, the eastern part of Ryttergårdsvej in Farum is built on the railway route.

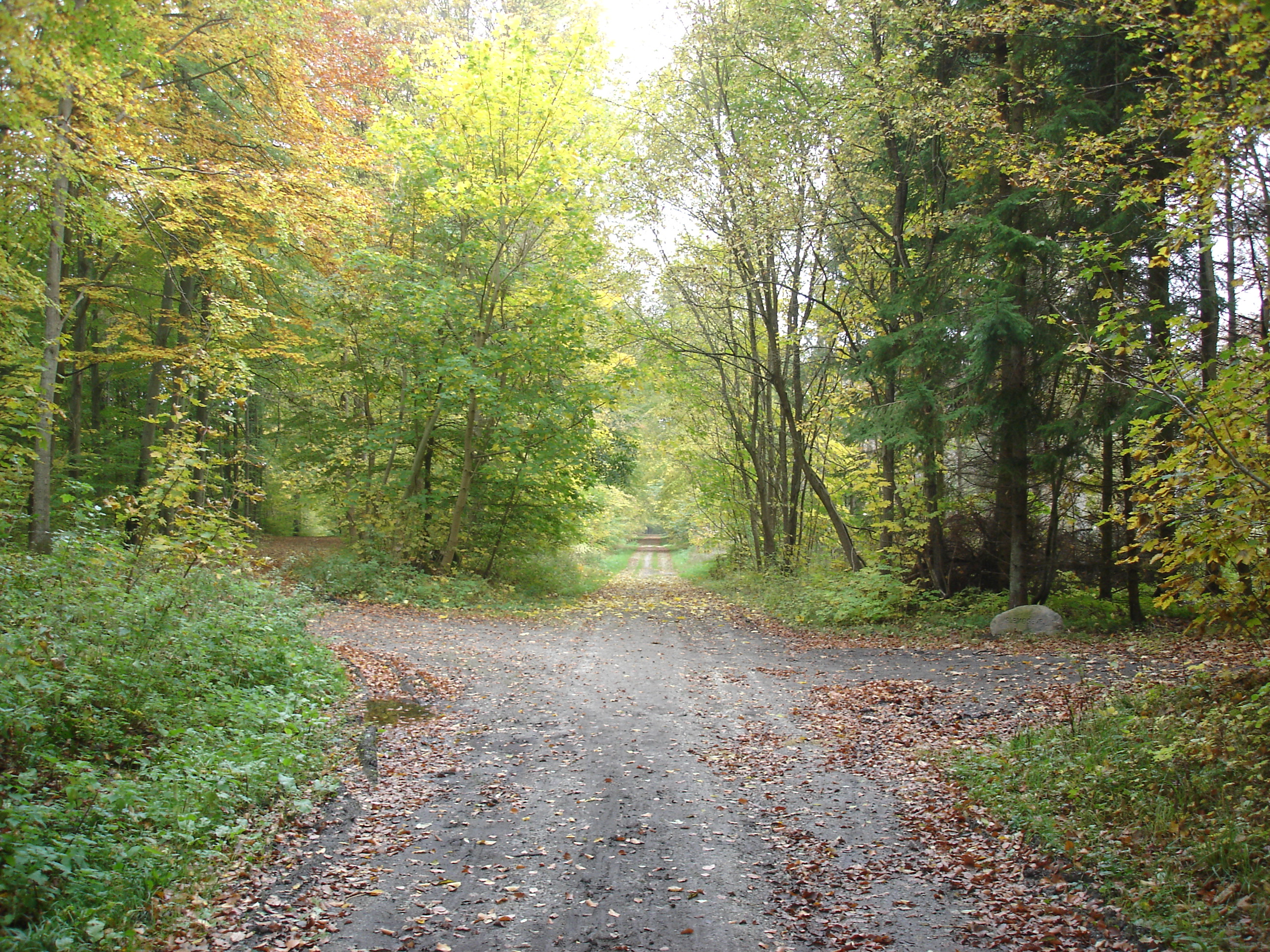
Gl. Jernbanevej in Farum Lillevang

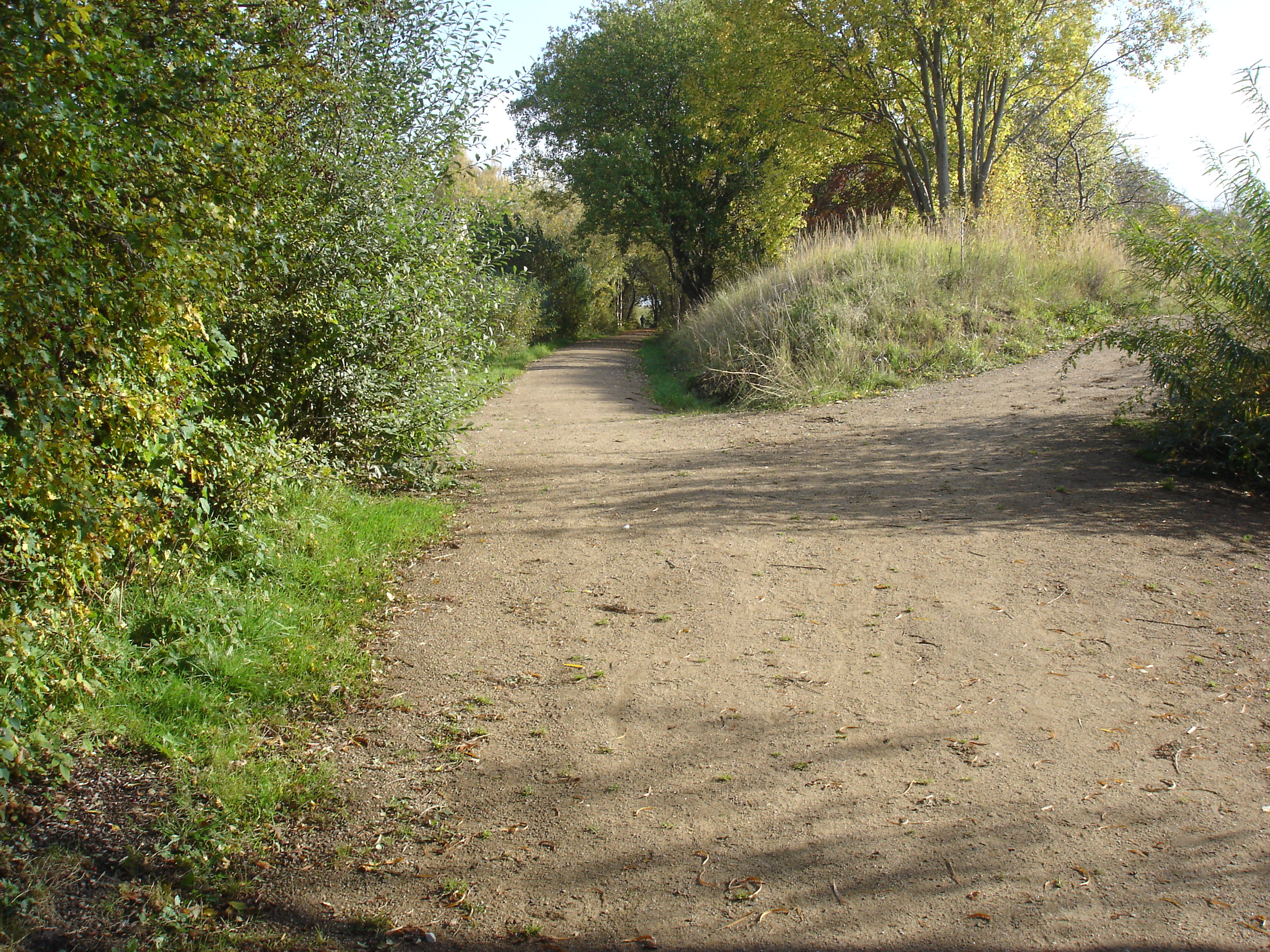
Cross-section east of Langkæret in Lynge

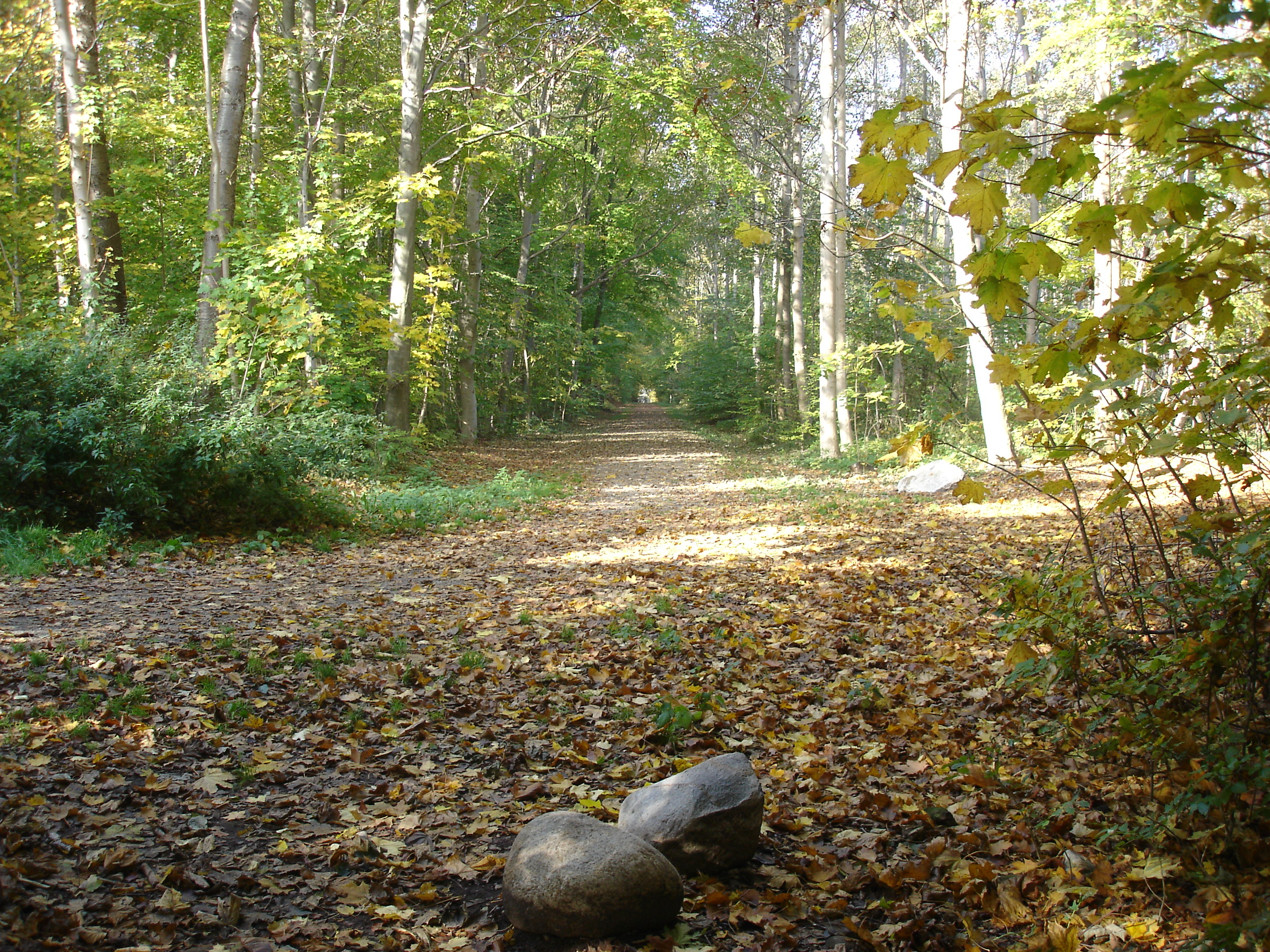
Jernbanevej in Uggeløse Forest

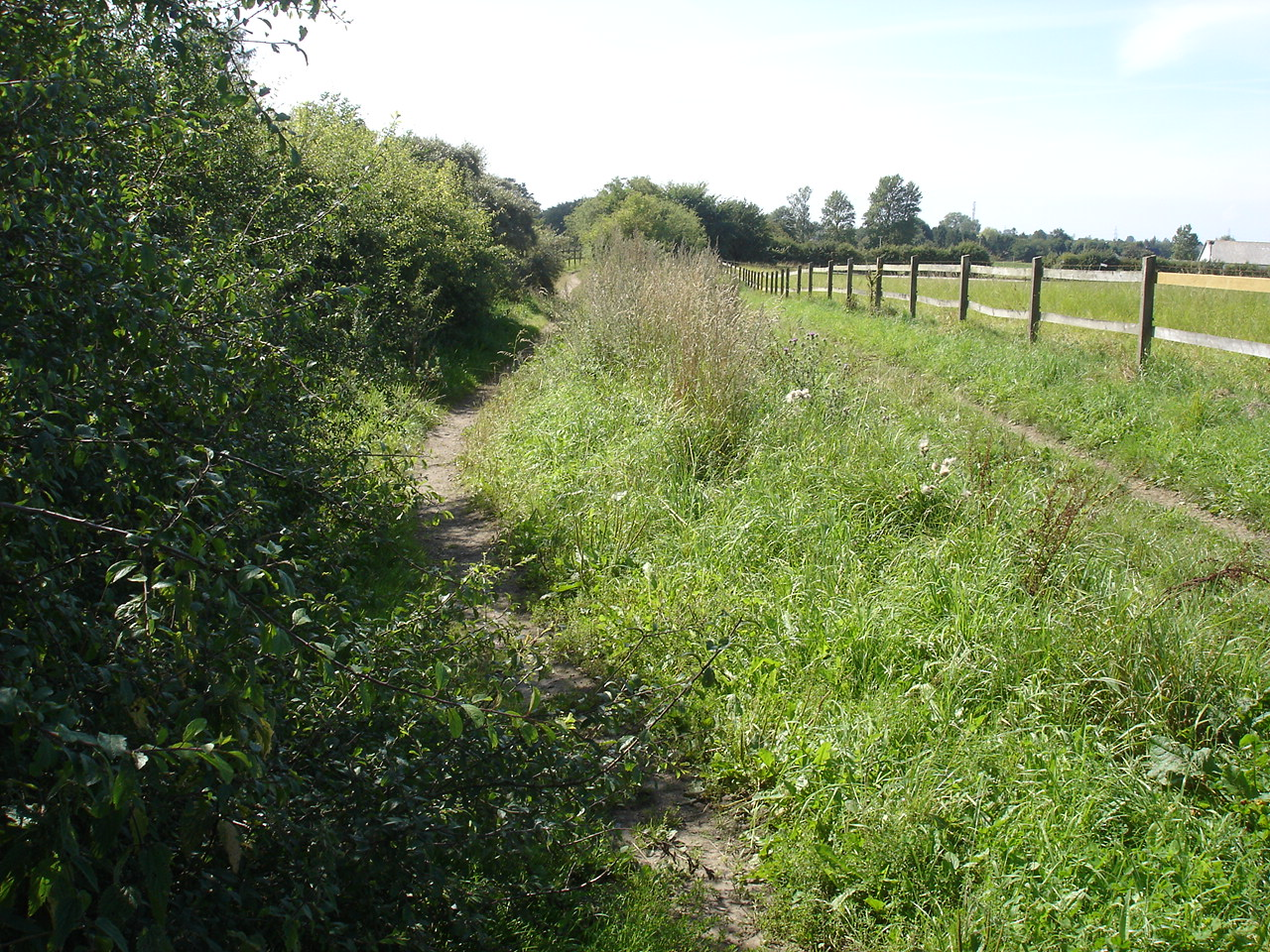
Slangerup Line route west for Lindholm Station

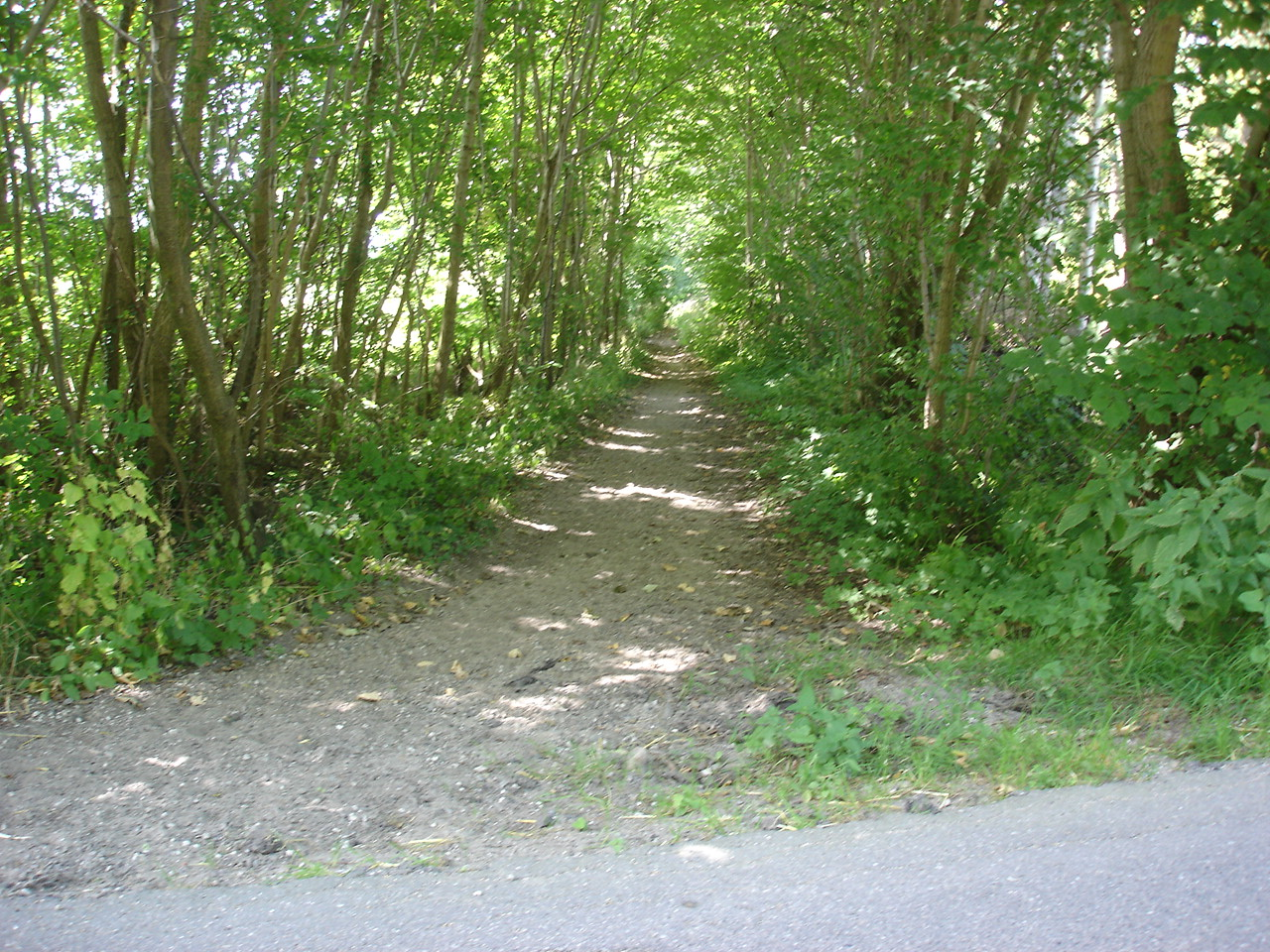
Slangerup Line route west for Lindholm Station

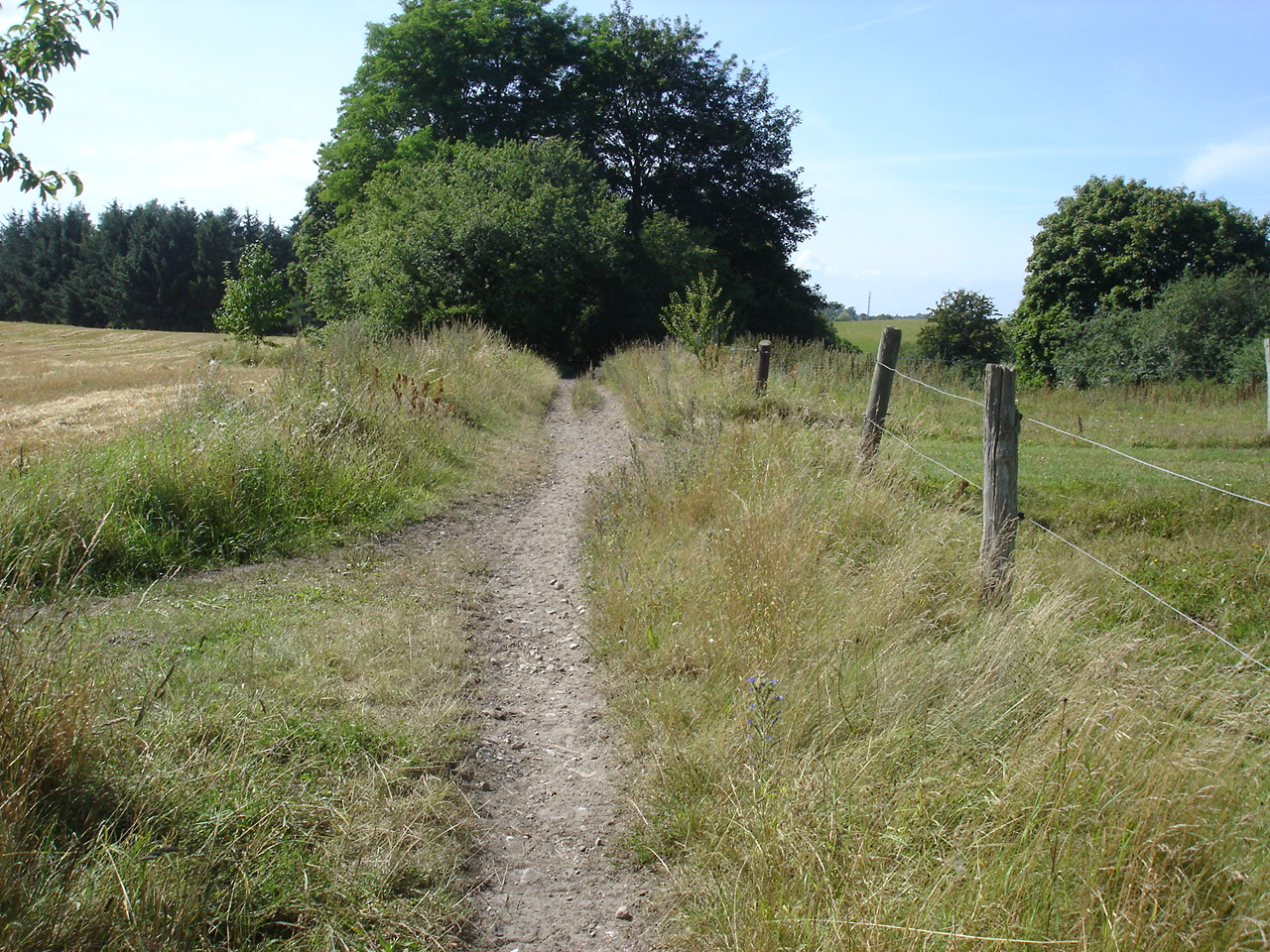
Between Lindholmvej and Slangerup Overdrev

== Stations ==
Name	Services	Opened	S-trains	Comments
København H	B	30 November 1911	15 May 1934	Central station; also all other radials; bus terminal; cross-link express bus 250S
Vesterport	B	15 May 1934		Also all other radials
Nørreport	B	1 July 1918	15 May 1934	Also all other radials; transfer to metro; bus terminal; cross-link express buses 150S and 350S
Østerport	B	2 August 1897	15 May 1934	Also all other radials; named Østerbro until 1934
Nordhavn	B	15 May 1934		Also Hillerød and Klampenborg radials
Svanemøllen	B	15 May 1934		Also Hillerød and Klampenborg radials
Ryparken	B	25 April 1976	25 September 1977	Transfer to ring line; bus terminal; cross-link express bus 150S
Emdrup	B	25 September 1977		
Dyssegård	B	22 May 1932	25 September 1977	
Vangede	B	19 April 1906	25 September 1977	
Kildebakke	B	15 May 1935	25 September 1977	
Buddinge	B	19 April 1906	25 September 1977	Bus terminal; cross-link express buses 200S, 250S & 300S
Stengården	B	15 May 1929	25 September 1977	
Bagsværd	B	19 April 1906	25 September 1977	Cross-link express bus 400S
Skovbrynet	B	1 October 1930	25 September 1977	
Hareskov	B	19 April 1906	25 September 1977	
Syvstjernen	—	15 May 1930	—	Closed since 1974
Værløse	B	19 April 1906	25 September 1977	Cross-link express bus 500S
Furesø	—	22 May 1932	—	Closed since 23 May 1971
Farum	B	19 April 1906	25 September 1977	Bus terminal; cross-link express bus 500S

== Service patterns ==
Diagram of the Copenhagen S-train network.

The basic service is the all-stops service B between København H and Farum. In the rush hours on Monday through Friday it is supplemented by the limited-stop service Bx.

Before 2007 the line was mainly served by service H (from 1972 to 1979 and again from 1993 to 2007 — then being the all-stop service on this line), and B (from 1979 to 1993).

== See also ==
- List of Copenhagen S-train lines
- Transportation in Copenhagen
- List of railway lines in Denmark
- Rail transport in Denmark
- Transportation in Denmark
- History of rail transport in Denmark
- S-train (Copenhagen)
- Banedanmark
