= Hareskoven =

Forested area in Denmark

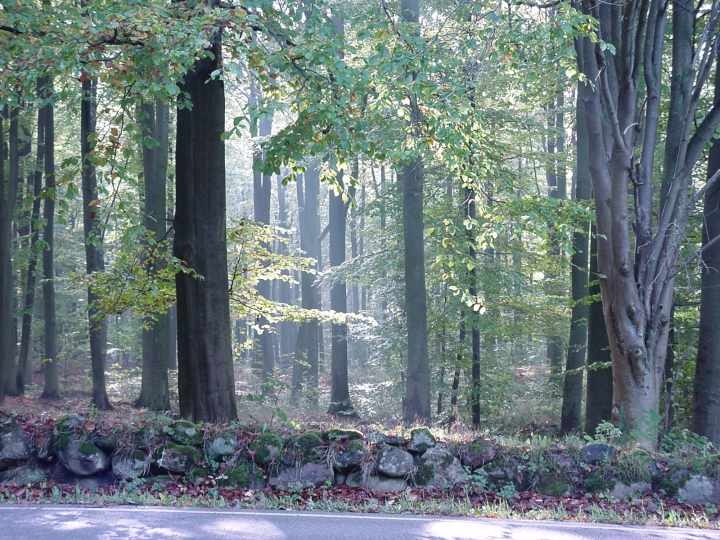
- Hareskoven viewed from Fægyden

- Location within Denmark

Geography
- Location: Furesø, Gladsaxe, Denmark
- Coordinates: 55°46′N 12°23′E
- Area: 8.08 km^{2} (3.12 sq mi)

Ecology
- WWF Classification: Baltic mixed forests

Hareskoven, or Hareskovene (plural), is a forested area straddling the boundary between Furesø and Gladsaxe municipalities in the northwestern suburbs of Copenhagen, Denmark. The core parts consists of Lille Hareskov and Store Hareskov, but Hareskovene also includes the adjacent woodlands of Egebjergene, Jonstrups Vang, and Bøndernes Hegn.

Hareskovene covers an area of only 8-900 hectares, but connects to many other woodlands and nature sites, reaching west to the Øresund, and north to the large Gribskov forest.

== History ==
The first part of the name (Hare- or Harre-) is derived from the Norse word Hörgr, meaning altar or cult site.

Hareskov was severely damaged during the Swedish Wars in the late 1650s. At the end of the war it was concluded that "the forest will only be able to feed 90 pigs". It was therefore protected for the next few years while it recovered.

== Ecology ==
Harskov consists mainly of beech forest with scattered oak, linden and maple trees. Notable solitaire trees include the three ancient oak trees Skrædderen (The Tailor), Grenaderen (The Grenadier) and Djævelen (The Devil). The latter used to look like a devil's hand reaching out for the sky. It was partly destroyed in a storm in 1981 but is still alive. In the winter and on migration, considerable numbers of Eurasian Woodcock come to feed in the bogs that usually do not freeze over.

== Historic features ==
Hareskoven contains a total of six dolmens from the Stone Age. The largest one is located close to Sandskredshus at Skovbrynet station.

Two examples of earthworks from the Swedish Wars known as Lejrens Indelukke (The Camp's Enclosure) and Svenskervolden (The Swedish Rampart) can still be seen in the southern part of the forest.

== Activities ==
Hareskoven forest contains a network of bridle paths for horseback riding as well as a trail for mountain biking. There are several basic campsites as well.
