= Farum railway station =

Commuter railway station in Greater Copenhagen, Denmark

Farum
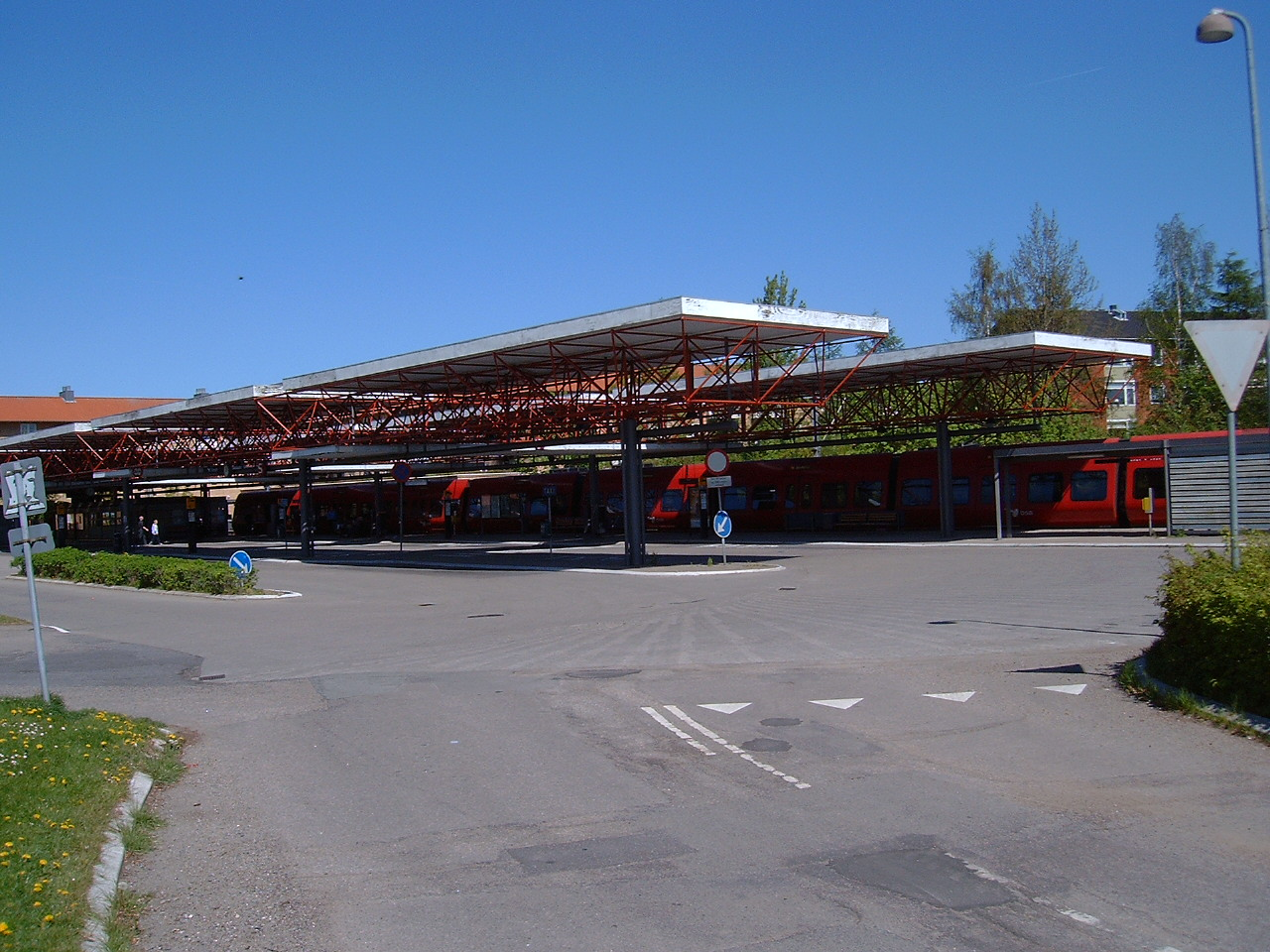
- Train and bus platforms side by side

General information
- Location: 1 Jernbanevej; 3520 Farum; Furesø Municipality; Denmark
- Coordinates: 55°48′43″N 12°22′26″E
- Elevation: 32.3 metres (106 ft)
- Owner: DSB (station infrastructure); Banedanmark (rail infrastructure)
- Line: Hareskov Line
- Platforms: 2 side platforms
- Tracks: 2
- Train operators: DSB
- Connections: Bus terminal

Construction
- Architect: Heinrich Wenck

Other information
- Station code: Fm
- Website: Official website

History
- Opened: 1906
- Rebuilt: 1977
- Electrified: 1977

Services
Preceding station	S-train	Following station
Terminus	B	Værløse towards Høje Taastrup
Location

Farum station is an S-train railway station serving the satellite town of Farum north of Copenhagen, Denmark. It is located about 1 km east of the old village Farum, but is the center of the modern Farum, which has grown up around the station.

Farum station is the northern terminus of the Hareskov Line of Copenhagen's S-train network, a hybrid commuter rail and rapid transit system serving Greater Copenhagen. It is served regularly by trains on the B-line which have a journey time to central Copenhagen of around 30 minutes. The station opened in 1906 with the opening of the Slangerup Line, and has been served by the S-train network since 1977.

== History ==
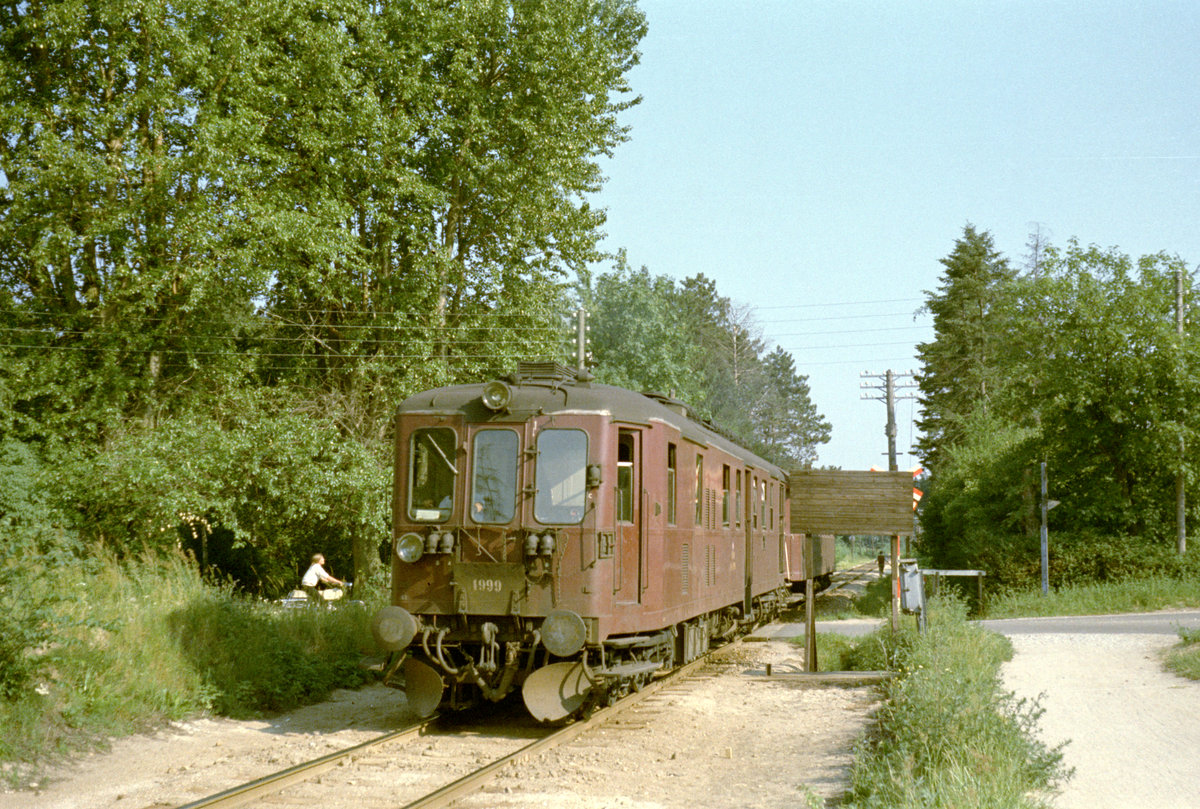
A DSB MO train entering Farum station in 1970.

The station opened on 19 April 1906 as an intermediate station on the Slangerup Line between Copenhagen and Slangerup.

The section north of Farum station between Farum and Slangerup closed on 15 May 1954.

The station was remodeled completely prior to the line's conversion to S-trains in 1977.

== Architecture ==
Farum station's first station building from 1906 was designed by the Danish architect Heinrich Wenck, known for the numerous railway stations he designed across Denmark in his capacity of head architect of the Danish State Railways from 1894 to 1921. The station building was torn down in 1975 prior to the station's conversion to S-train in 1977.

== Cultural references ==
Farum Station has been used as a location in the films Sikken en nat (1947), Fra den gamle købmandsgaard (1951) and Soldaterkammerater (1958).

== Gallery ==
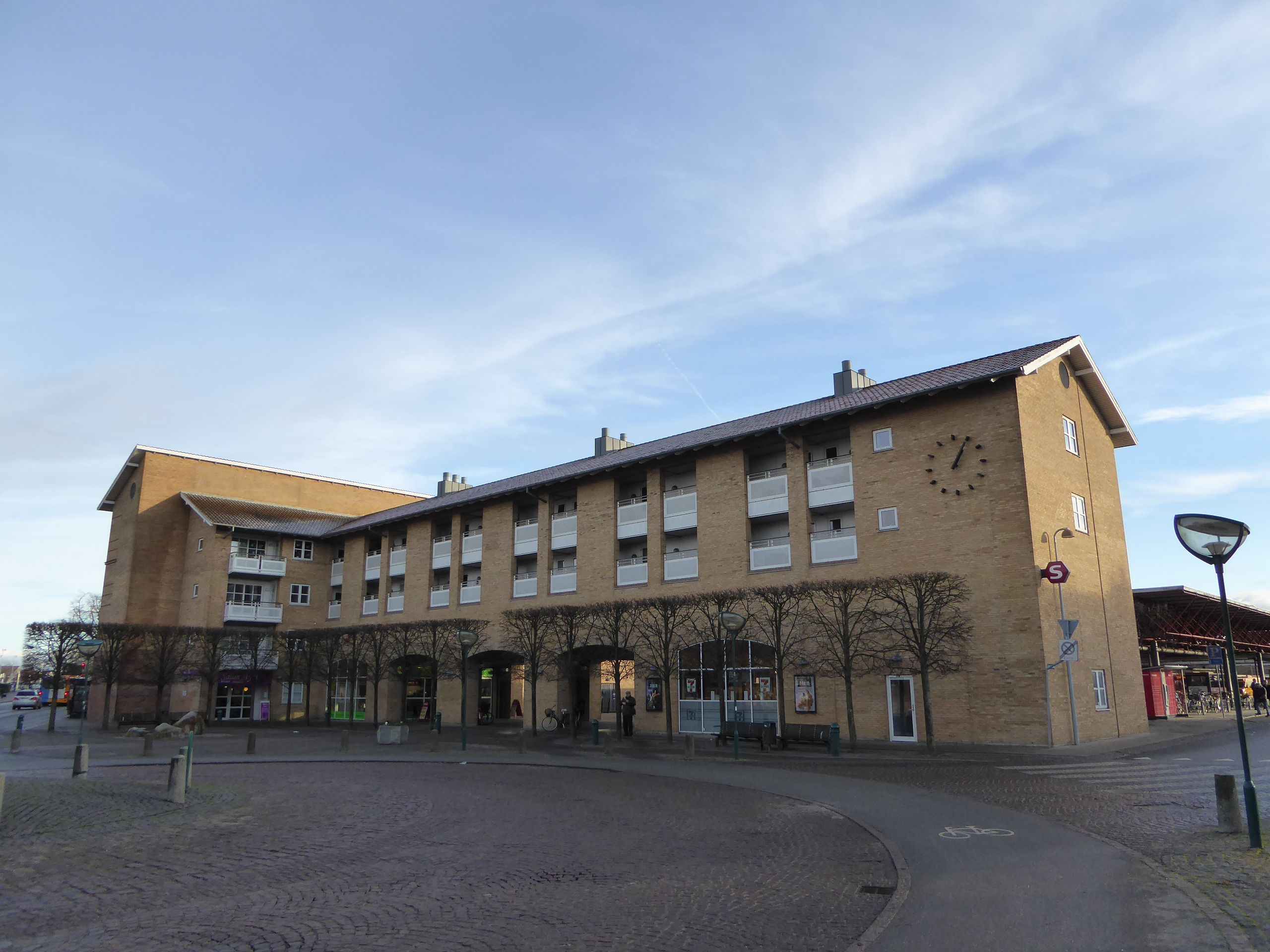
North entrance

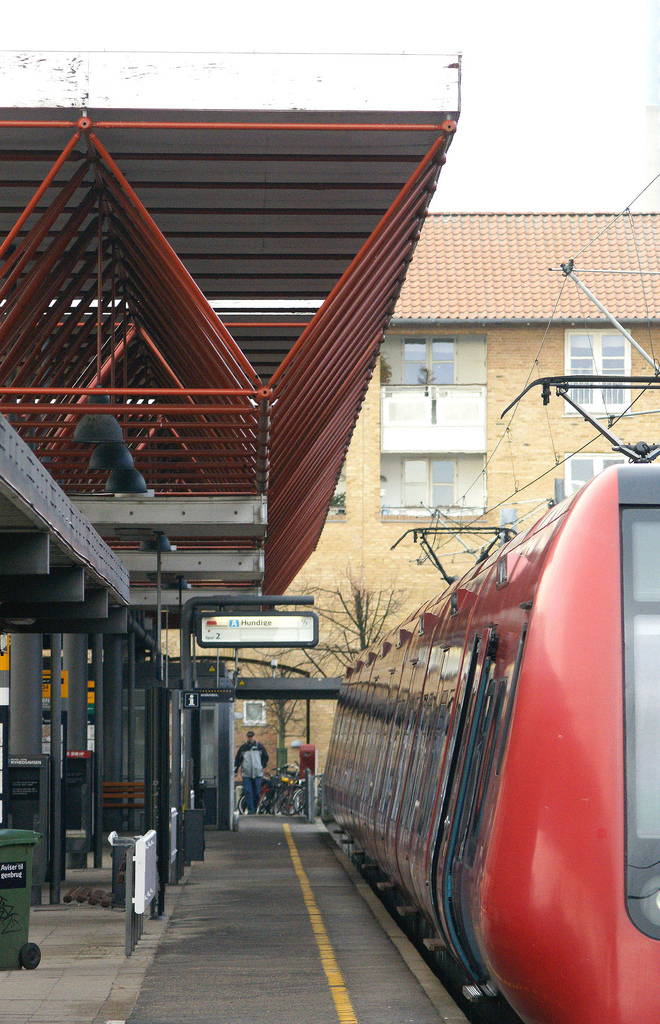
Platforms

== See also ==
- List of Copenhagen S-train stations
- List of railway stations in Denmark
- Rail transport in Denmark
- Transport in Copenhagen
