= Atelierhusene =

Housing development in Copenhagen, Denmark

Coordinates: 55.7223°N 12.5242°E

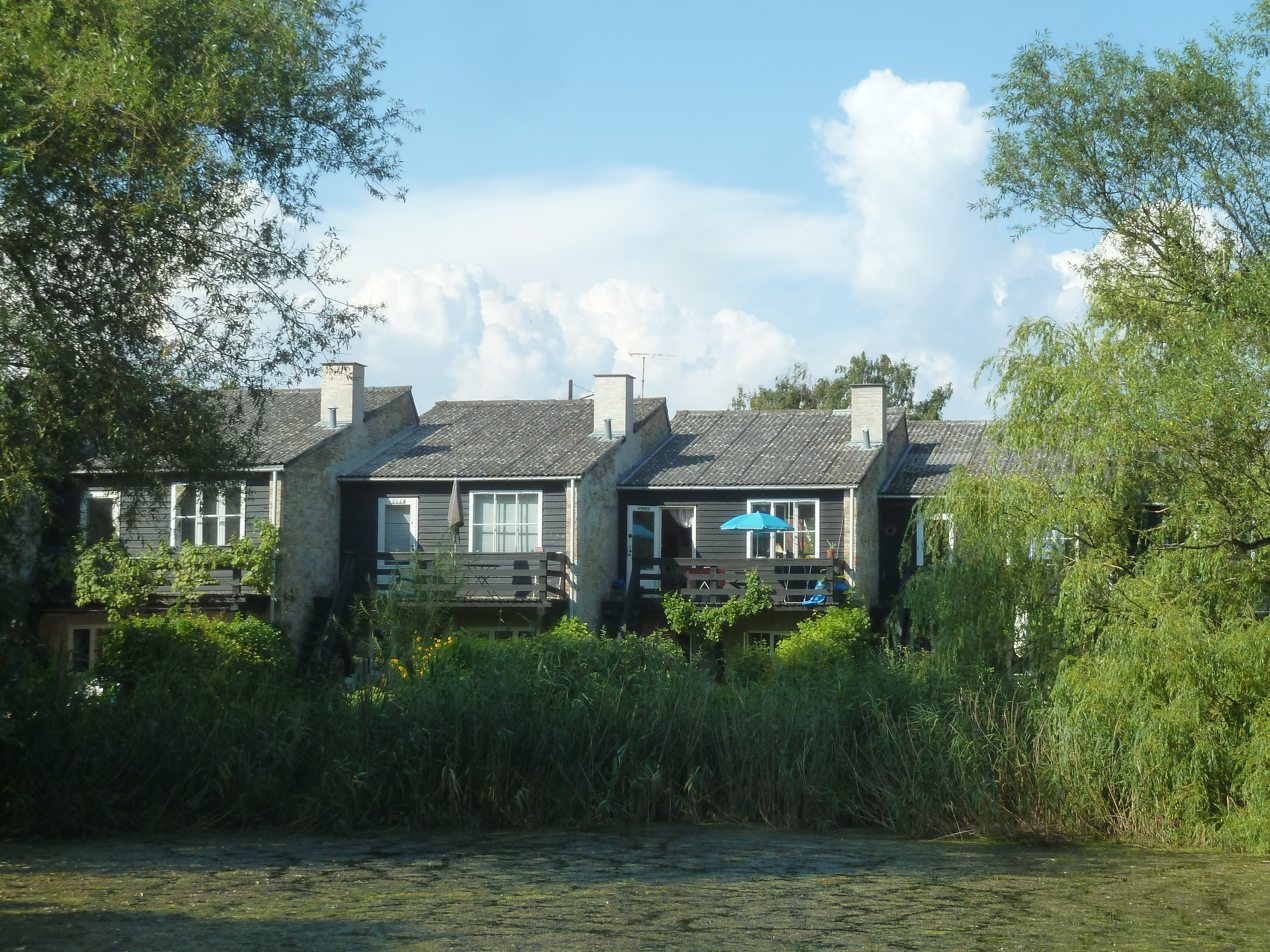
One of the three terraces viewed from across the lake

Atelierhusene (lit. "The Studio Houses"), also known as Kunstnerbyen (lit. "The Artists' Town), is a terraced housing development built in the 1940s to provide affordable living and working space for artists in Copenhagen, Denmark. It is located on the east side of Utterslev Mose and consists of three terraces, each with 7 houses, surrounding a small green space with a lake.

== History ==
Atelierhusene were built in the early 1940s under influence of the housing shortage and scarcity of building materials that characterized Copenhagen during the German occupation of Denmark in World War II. The idea for the development was conceived by the sculptors Povl Søndergaard and Johan Galster and the architect Viggo Møller Jensen, who knew each other from the Royal Danish Academy of Fine Arts. A similar project had previously been completed successfully by others with the construction of Kunstnerhjemmet in Gothersgade. The project was developed in collaboration with Foreningen Socialt Boligbyggeri (The Association for Social Housing) and with support from the Ministry of Interior Affairs. The selected site had previously been used for market gardens. Several banks supported the project with loans on favourable conditions and artists donated works for a lottery as part of the financing. The houses were completed in 1943. The entire development was listed in 1990.

== Architecture ==
The development is located on Grønnemose Allé and consists of 21 houses, each with a 35-m2 studio, distributed on three terraces with dwellings of different sizes. The development is located on three sides of a green space with a small lake known as Vigos Sø (Vigo's Lake) after the project's architect.

The row with the smallest houses lines the street. The single-room houses with an area of just 71 m2 have a small yard on their front side and a balcony overlooking the lake at the back. The two other terraces, located on either side of the lake, perpendicular to the road, consist of houses with three and four rooms, respectively (105 and 116 m2). They have a Z-shaped layout with a front yard in association with the studio (originally for carving) on their east side and a terrace facing the garden on their west side.

== Residents ==
The houses are available to members of Kunstnersamfundet. There is an open-house event each year in September where residents open up their homes and exhibit their works.

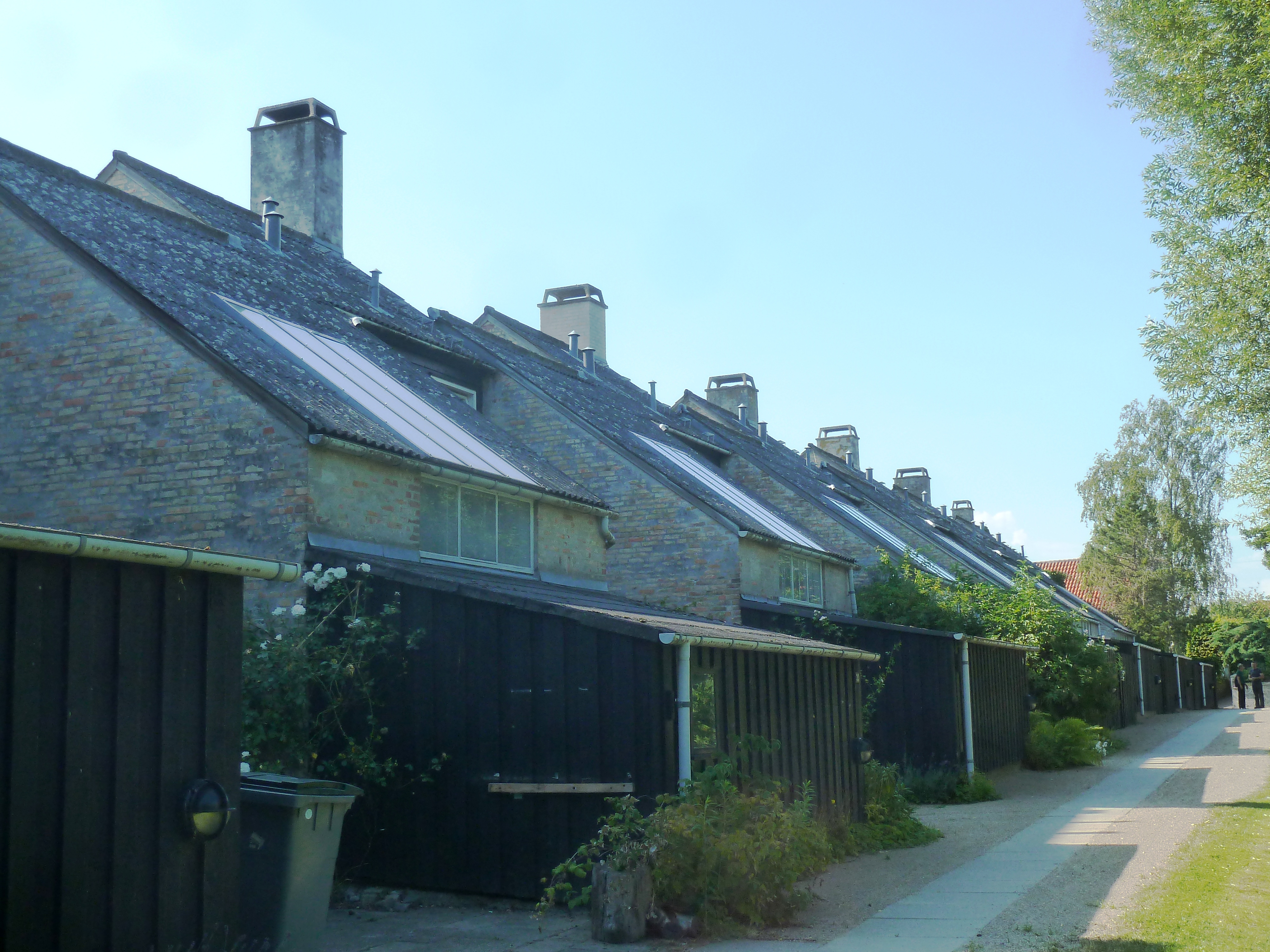

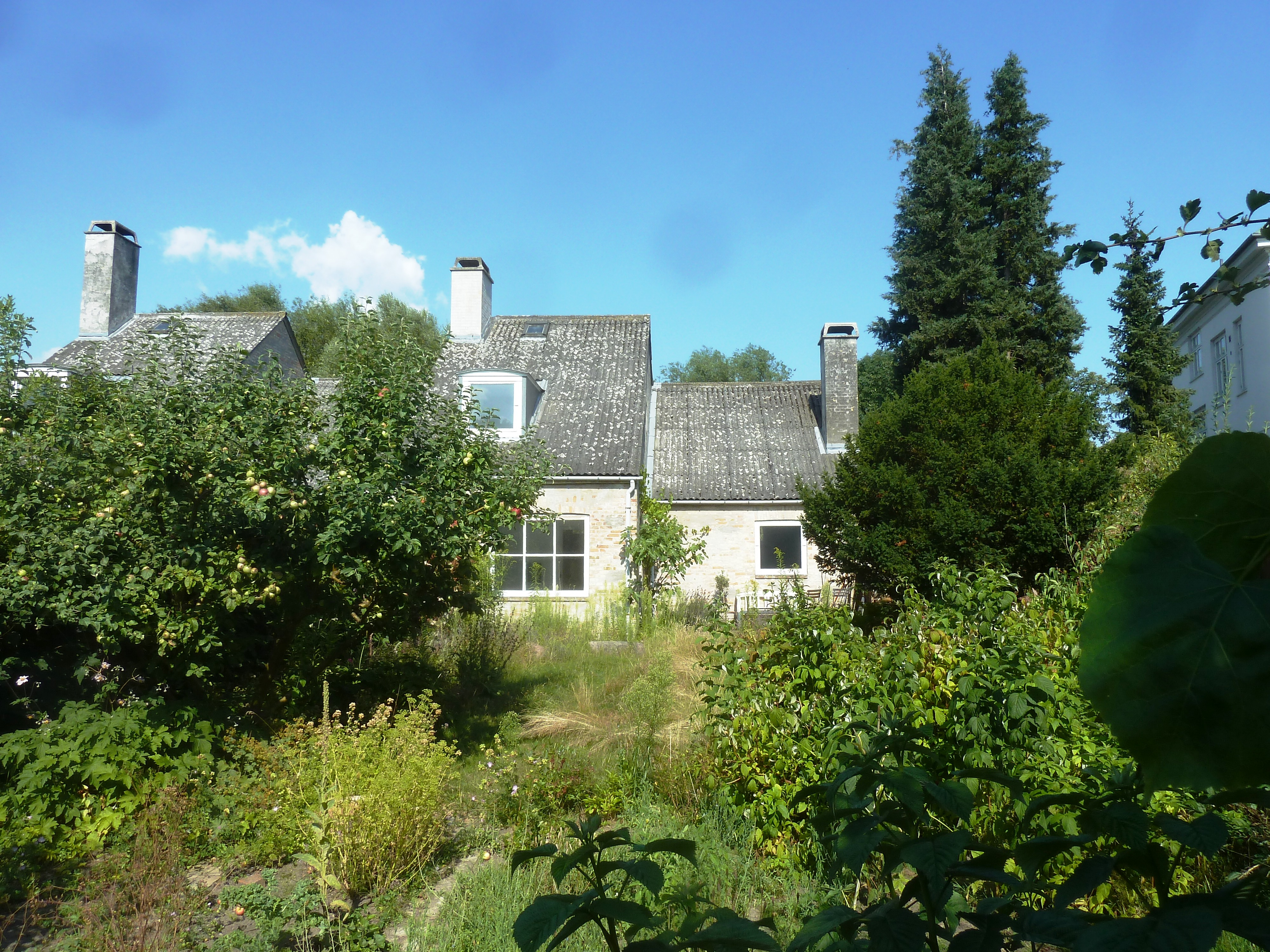

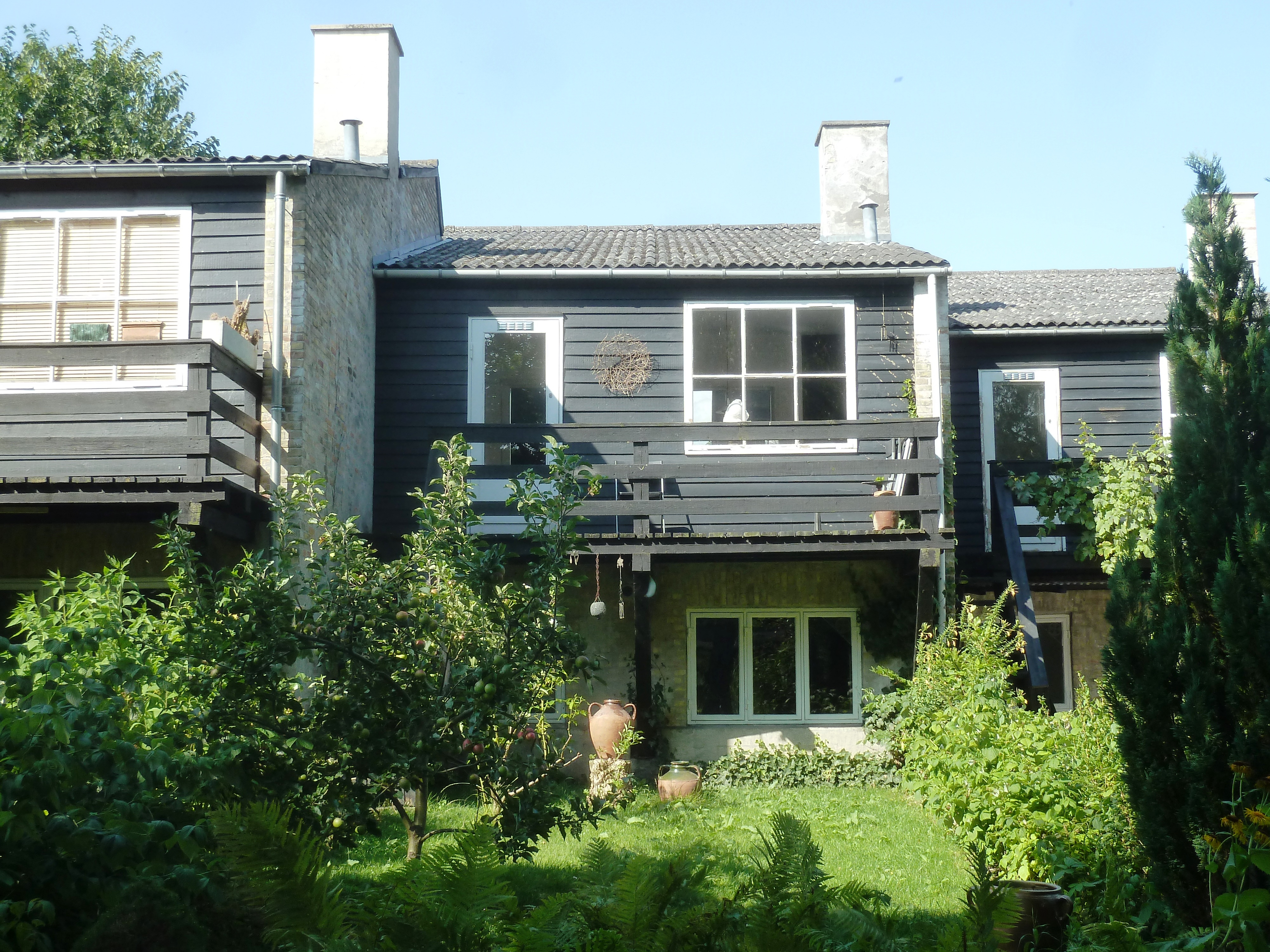

== See also ==
- Kunstnerhjemmet
- Holckenhus
