= Blaagaard Seminarium =

Teacher's training college in Denmark

Coordinates: 55.7235°N 12.4769°E

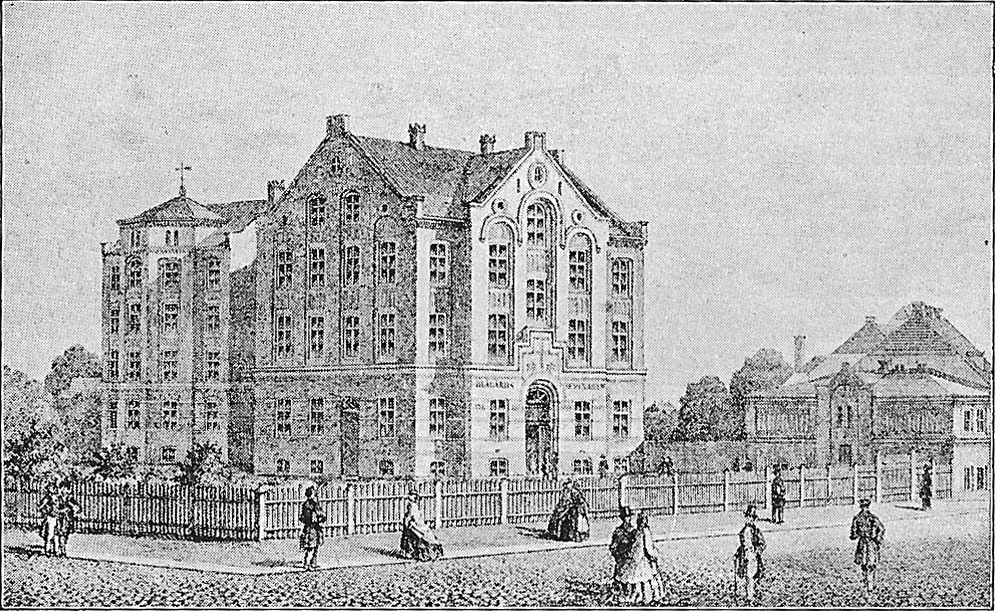
The second Blaagaard Seminarium shortly after the inauguration of its new building in Blaagaardsgade in 1863

Blaagaard Seminarium (also spelled Blågård Seminarium) has been the name of two teacher training colleges both originating in the Nørrebro district of Copenhagen, Denmark. The first of them, which was the first teacher training college in Denmark, changed its name to Jonstrup Seminarium in 1808. The second one was founded in 1859. They merged in 1992 and are now part of University College Capital (UCC).

== History ==
The first Blågård Seminarium was established in Blaagaard's main building in 1791. It was the first teacher training college in Denmark. Its name was changed to Jonstrup Seminarium when it moved to the former textile factory in Jonstrup outside Copenhagen in 1808.

A new Blaagaard Seminarium was founded by Jeppe Tang in rented rooms in Blågårdsgade in 1759. In 1863, it moved to a new purpose-built building in the same street. It later moved to new premises in Ravnsborggade and in 1872 to a new site in Emdrup. The school was hit by fire but reopened in 1879. In 1923, it moved to Hindegade School and in 1933 to Kapelvej School on Kapelvej in Nørrebro where it shared the building with a boys' school. In 1947, Blaagaard Seminarium was opened to women students. In 1953, it went from being a private college to a self-owning institution. In 1963, it moved to a new campus on Mørkhøj Parkallé (No. 5) in Søborg in 1964 under the direction of rector Svend Henriksen. In 1984, Blaagaard Seminarium was merged with Statsseminariet på Emdrupborg which had taken over its former premises in Emdrup. In 1992, Blågård Seminarium was merged with Jonstrup Seminarium and in 2008 with Københavns Dag- og Aftenseminarium under the name Blaagaard.

== Notable people ==
=== Faculty ===
- Frederik Høgh-Guldberg, writer and professor

=== Alumni ===
- 1869 Enevold Sørensen, politician and editor
- 194_ Ernst Bruun Olsen, actor and stage director
- 1971 Helle Degn, politician
- 1974 Bjarne Reuter, author
