= Utterslev =

Neighborhood in Bispebjerg, Copenhagen, Denmark

Coordinates: 55°42′38″N 12°30′59″E

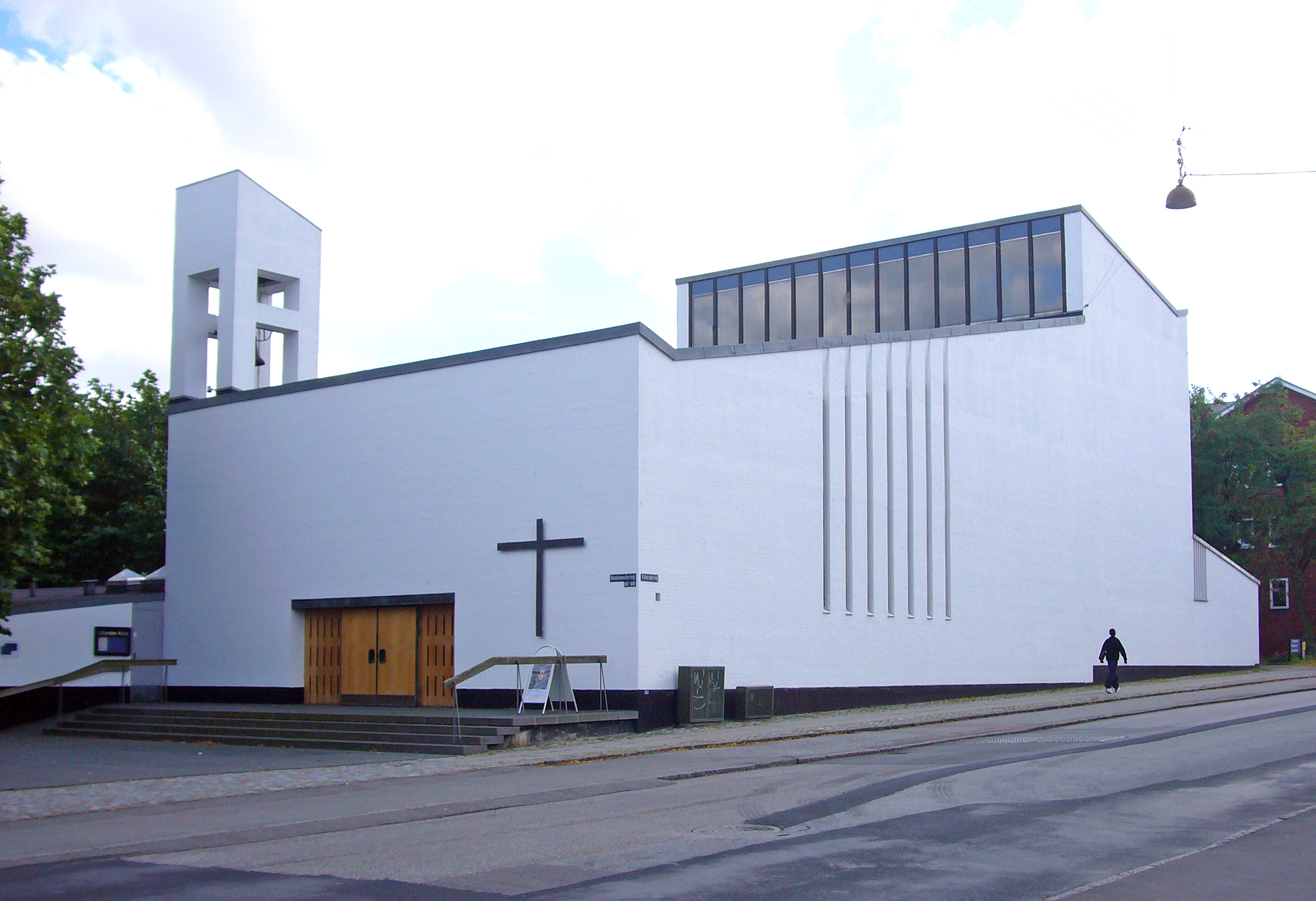
Utterslev Church, Copenhagen

Utterslev is a neighbourhood in the Bispebjerg district of Copenhagen, Denmark. Utterslev is centered on Utterslev Torv (Utterslev Square) and is most known for the Utterslev Mose marshland which straddles the border with Gladsaxe Municipality to the north.

== History ==
In the Middle Ages Utterslev was a large country estate comprising the villages of Serridslev, Solbjerg, Vanløse, Vigerslev, Valby, Brønshøj and Emdrup. The village of Utterslev has existed since the 14th century when it consisted of houses and farm buildings around the village pond. In the Dano-Swedish War of 1657, King Charles X Gustav of Sweden established his headquarters in Utterslev. The village lost its status as such in 1784.

== Notable buildings and residents ==
Marked on maps in the 12th and 13th centuries, the village pond is one of the oldest in Denmark. The pond is still surrounded by old buildings and some of the former roads. In 2000, together with its surroundings, Utterslev Torv was developed as a green area and central attraction for the local population.

Utterslev Church, completed in 1963, closed in September 2013 as a result of weakening support. Only half of those living in the area are members of the Church of Denmark. Efterslægten, an upper secondary school, has been situated in the area since 1940. Utterslev Skole, completed in 2006, was the first folkeskole to be built by Copenhagen Municipality for more than 25 years. Located between Utterslev Torv and Bispebjerg Cemetery, it was designed to set new standards for flexibility, air quality and sustainability, where possible making use of environmentally friendly materials. The building known as Sokkelundlille (now a child-care centre) was originally a hunting lodge built for King Christian VII in 1770.

== Parks and open spaces ==
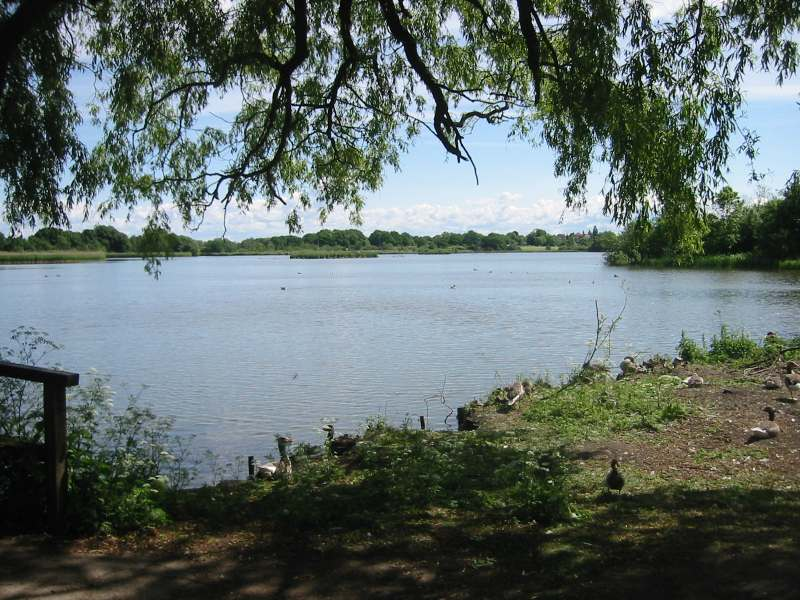
Utterslev Mose

Utterslev Mose, Copenhagen's largest area of parkland, was laid out around Søborg Sø in 1943. Now a recreational area, it is known for its lakes and bird life.
