= Vangede =

Suburb of Copenhagen, Denmark

Coordinates: 55°45′N 12°32′E

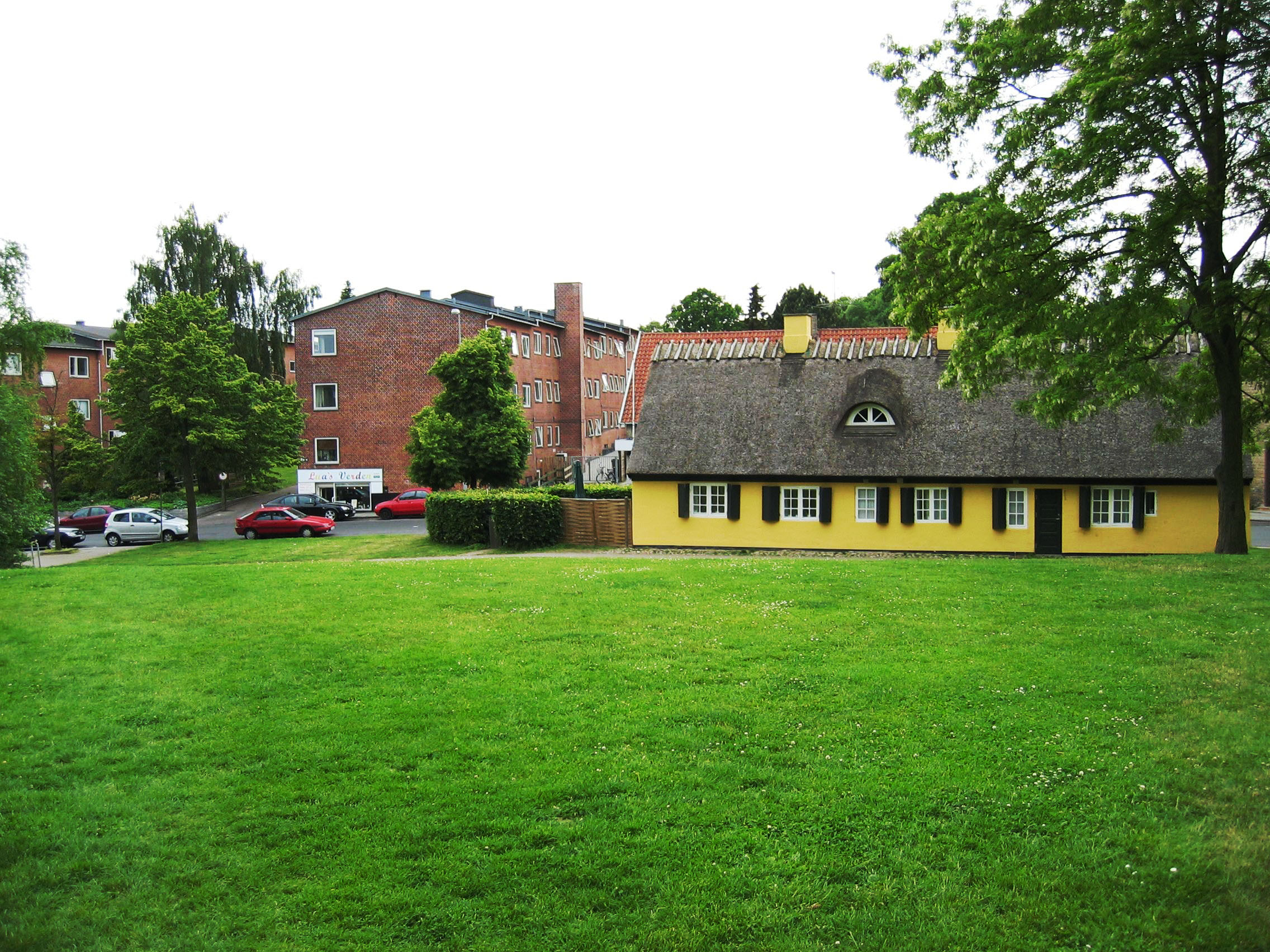
Vangede Bygade

Vangede is a suburb 8 km north of central Copenhagen, Denmark. This area is primarily made up of one and two family houses and two and three story apartment buildings.

== History ==
The first known references to the village is from 1346 when it is referred to as Wangwethæ.

== Landmarks ==
Munkegaard School was completed in 1953 to a design by Arne Jacobsen. Vangede Church is from 1974 and was designed by Johan Otto von Spreckelsen, who would later also design the Grande Arche in Paris. Vangede Battery has been converted into a park.

== Transport ==
Vangede has three S-train-stations, Vangede, Kildebakke and Dyssegård, all three of them are located on the Farum radial. Vangede is served by both the A and H trains while Dyssegård is only served by A trains. Some would consider Dyssegård being located in Dyssegård and not in Vangede.

== Cultural references ==
The author Dan Turèll grew up in the neighbourhood and has portrayed it in his book Vangede billeder.

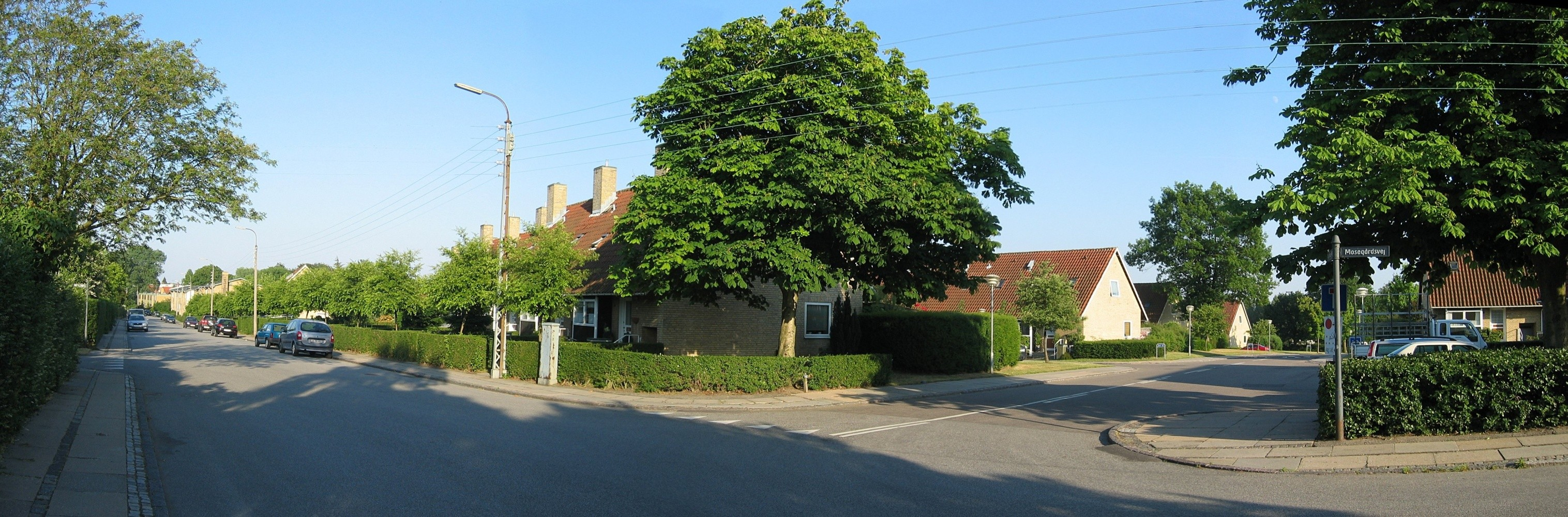
Nymose Huse in Vangede where the writer Dan Turell lived for most of his life

== Notable people ==
- Peer Hultberg (1935 in Vangede – 2007) a Danish author and psychoanalyst
- Dan Turèll (1946 in Vangede – 1993), affectionately nicknamed "Onkel Danny" (Uncle Danny), was a popular Danish writer
- Povl Erik Carstensen (born 1960 in Vangede) a Danish comedian, actor and jazz double bassist
