= Emdrup railway station =

Commuter railway station in Copenhagen, Denmark

Emdrup
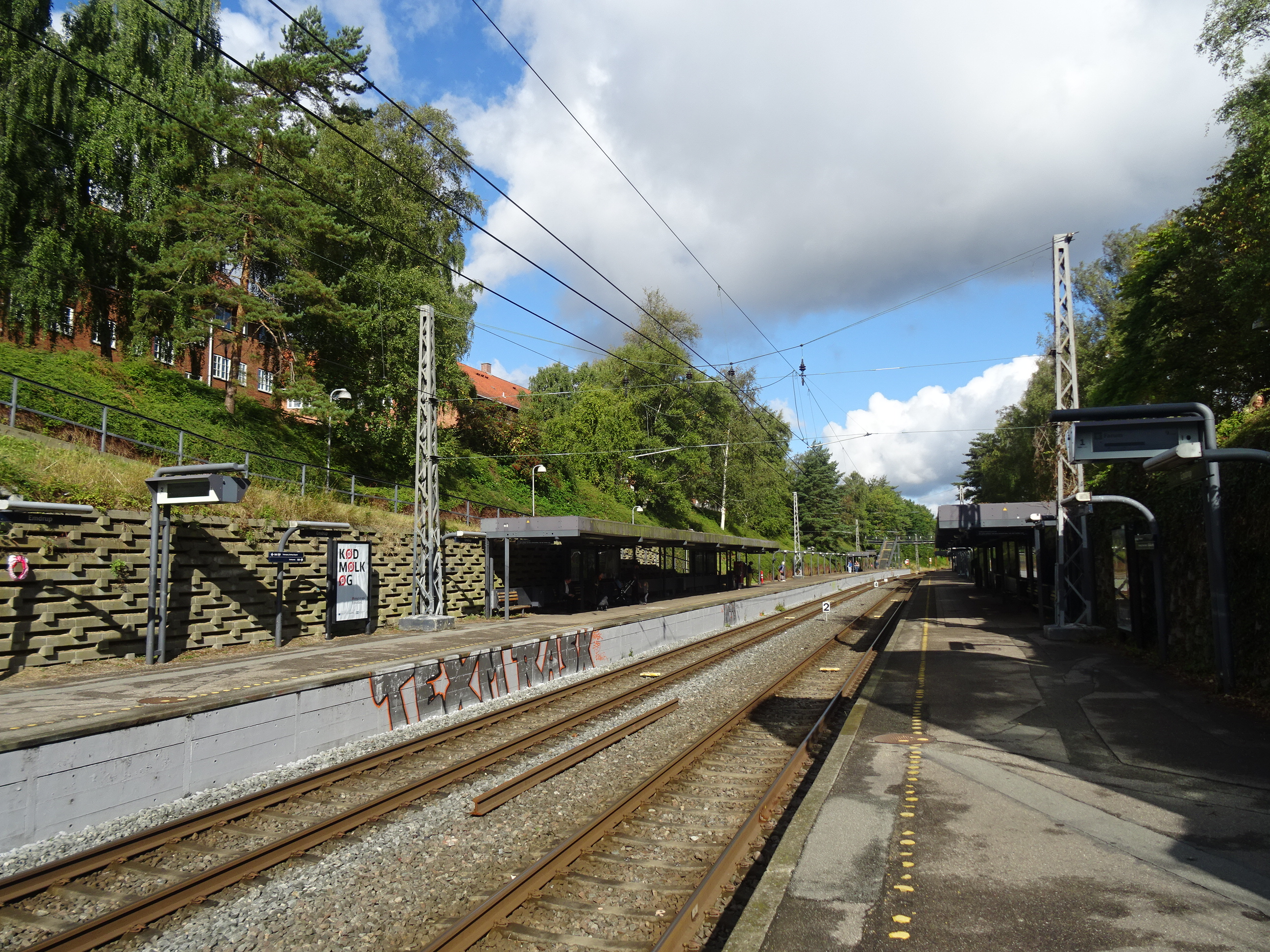
- Emdrup station in 2025

General information
- Location: Tuborgvej 170; 2400 Copenhagen NV; Copenhagen Municipality; Denmark
- Coordinates: 55°43′14″N 12°32′28″E
- Elevation: 21.1 metres (69 ft)
- Owner: DSB (station infrastructure); Banedanmark (rail infrastructure)
- Platforms: 2 side platforms
- Tracks: 2
- Train operators: DSB

Other information
- Website: Official website

Services
Preceding station	S-train	Following station
Dyssegård towards Farum	B	Ryparken towards Høje Taastrup
Dyssegård towards Buddinge	Bx Peak hours	Ryparken towards Høje Taastrup
Location

Emdrup station is an S-train railway station serving the neighbourhood of Emdrup in the northwestern part of Copenhagen, Denmark. Local landmarks include Aarhus University's Copenhagen campus and Emdrup Lake. The station is located on the Farum radial of Copenhagen S-train network.

== History ==
The station was not one of the original stations on the Slangerup Station. The station opened on 20 April 1906. The station building was one of the smallest on the rail line and of the same type as the one on Hareskov Station. At the time of its opening, it was still surrounded by open farm land. The station only attracted few passengers due to competition from the tram lines to nearby Bispebjerg but was of more importance as a freight station due to a lumberyard at the site. The station was closed on 31 March but reopened as an S-train station on 25 September 1977.

== See also ==
- List of Copenhagen S-train stations
- List of railway stations in Denmark
