= AU Campus Emdrup =

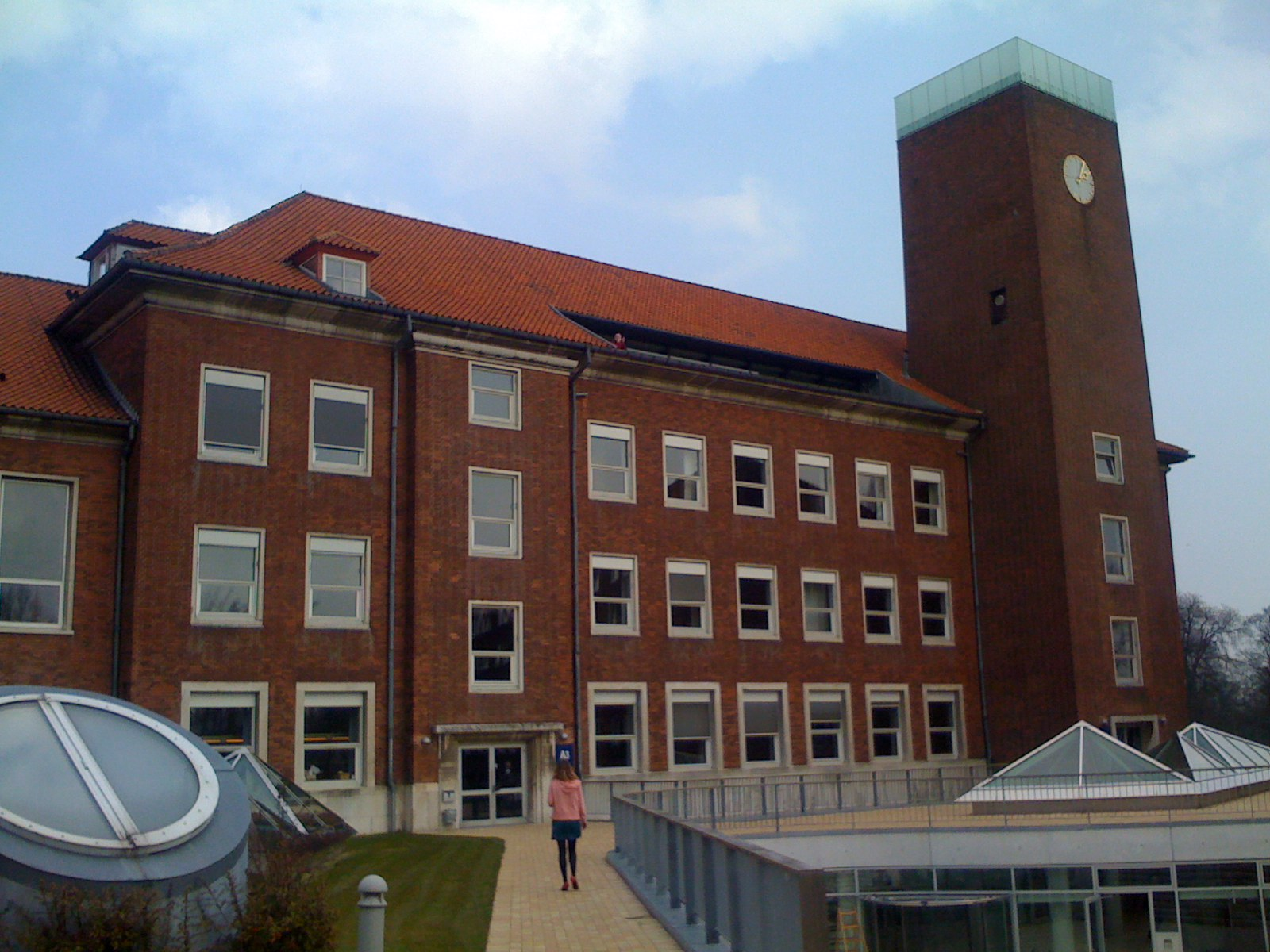
AU Campus Emdrup

AU Campus Emdrup is Aarhus University's campus in Copenhagen, Denmark. Situated in Emdrup, just north of Emdrup station, it was created when the Danish University of Education (Danmarks Pædagogosike Universitet, DPU) was merged with Aarhus University in 2007. An expansion of the campus is planned and it will in the future also host activities within the areas of biosciences, energy and environmental studies.

== History ==
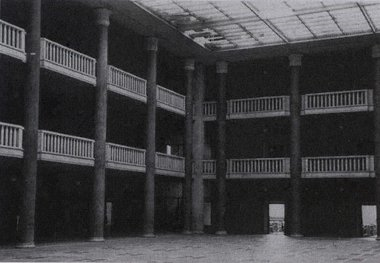
The large auditorium before Havning's redesign in 1947-50

The campus traces its history back to 1872 when the teacher training college Blaagaard Seminarium moved to the site. It had been founded by the educator Jeppe Tang at Blågårdsgade (No. 14) and already moved several times. The school was destroyed by fire but rebuilt in 1879. It closed in 1913 and the buildings were then left empty until they were purchased by Copenhagen Municipality in 1917.

The site was taken over by Die Deutsche Schule shortly after the German Occupation of Denmark in 1940. The German architect Werner March was charged with the design of a "Reichdeutsche Schulen, Sportanlagen under Kindergärten" for children of the occupying German forces. The first part of the complex, two wings and a watch tower was largely completed in 1942 but construction then went on hold due to the shortage of building materials and it was never completed. After the war the buildings were initially used for housing refugees and various military activities. The guardtower was seen as a symbol of the German occupation and its spire was pulled down just a few months after the liberation in May 1945.

In 1947, royal building inspector Thomas Havning was tasked with completing the buildings for the Royal Danish School of Educational Studies (Danmarks Lærerhøjskole), Statsseminariet and Københavns Kommunale Forsøgsskole. He changed the façade, shortened the tower and redesigned the interior with use of wood instead of artificial stone. C.Th. Sørensen created a new garden plan in 1949. In 1957, Havning designed the Emdrupborgkollegiet dormitory. A laboratory building designed by Sven Eske-Kristensen was built in the southwestern corner of the campus area in 1979.

The Danish University of Education was established on 1 July 2000 through the merger of the Royal Danish School of Educational Studies, the Danish National Institute for Educational Research, the Danish School of Advanced Pedagogy and the Danish National Centre for Technology-Supported Learning. Its status changed from independent university to a university school at the University of Aarhus when DPU merged with Aarhus University on 1 June 2007.

== Dormitory ==
A new Emdrupborg Kollegium dormitory was built in 2009. It is located at Emdrupborgvej 54 A-C, across the street from Institut for Uddannelse og Pædagogik (IUP/DPU) and consists of three four-storey buildings with 111 rooms in total. Each floor has a common kitchen and all rooms are equipped with a kitchenette, a small refrigerator, and a bathroom. Other facilities include an assembly room, fitness room, and laundry room.

== Expansion ==
Aarhus University is planning an expansion of their Emdrup Campus with a new 13,000 square metre building. The building will house National Center for Environment and Energy (DVI), Institute for Environmental Sciences, Institute for Biosciences as well as administrative functions.
