= Vangede Battery =

Coordinates: 55.7508°N 12.5142°E

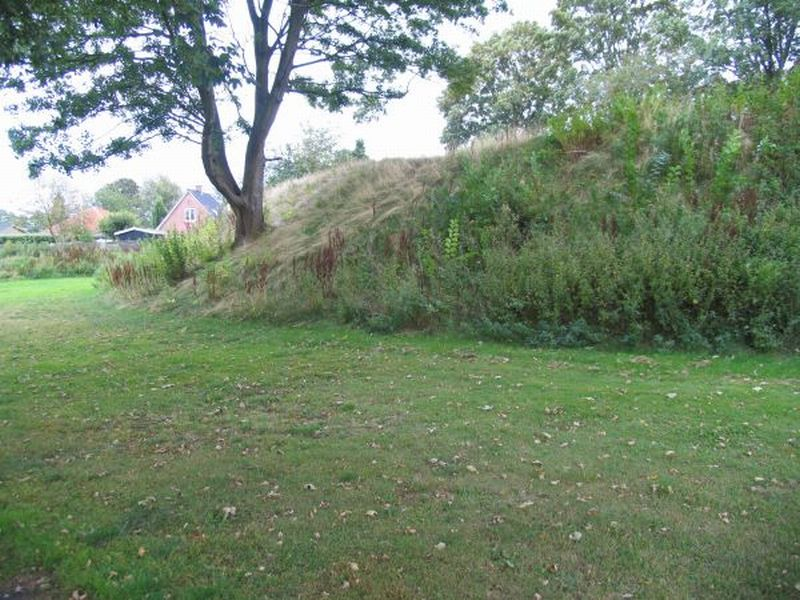
Vangede Battery

Vangede Battery (Danish: Vangede Batteri), located in Vangede, Gentofte Municipality, is a former military structure and current park in the northern suburbs of Copenhagen, Denmark.

== History ==
Vangede Battery was constructed in 1888 as part of Copenhagen's new ring fortification and was to guard the area between Lyngby Fort and GarderhøjFort. The structure was dug into a hill located just west of the village of Vangede. It was 350 metres long and had a crescent shape with a dry moat located in front of it. It contained a barracks building with four residential rooms for officers and private soldiers as well as a munition magazine. The battery was equipped with two 1+-trunk machine guns and nine 12 cm canons.

The battery was decommissioned along with the rest of the fortifications in 1920. The casemate was later used by a now closed tin recycling plant.

== Today ==
The northern and central part of the area has been converted into a public park by Gentofte Municipality while southern part of the area has been sold off and redeveloped with single-family detached homes. The casemate is now the site of a playground. The northern battery line is well-preserved and can be seen from Horsevej and Stolbergsvej.
