= Vangede railway station =

Commuter railway station in Greater Copenhagen, Denmark

Vangede
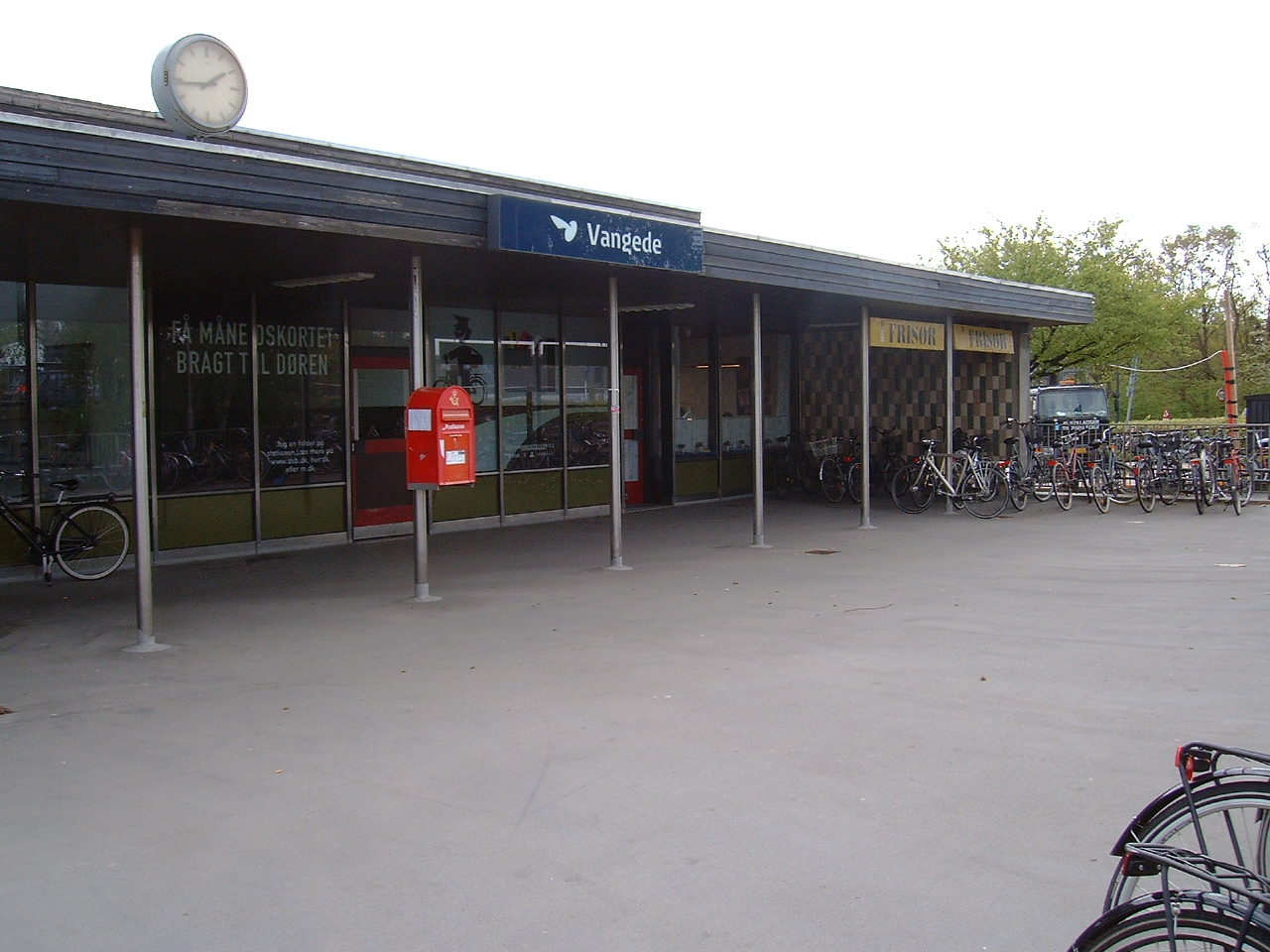
- Vangede station in 2007

General information
- Location: Vangedevej 145; Vangede, 2820 Gentofte; Gentofte Municipality; Denmark
- Coordinates: 55°44′22″N 12°31′25″E
- Elevation: 28.9 metres (95 ft)
- Owner: DSB (station infrastructure); Banedanmark (rail infrastructure)
- Platforms: Island platform
- Tracks: 2
- Train operators: DSB

History
- Opened: 1906

Services
Preceding station	S-train	Following station
Kildebakke towards Farum	B	Dyssegård towards Høje Taastrup
Kildebakke towards Buddinge	Bx Peak hours	Dyssegård towards Høje Taastrup
Location

Vangede station is an S-train railway station serving the Vangede district of Gentofte Municipality north of Copenhagen, Denmark. It is located on the Farum radial of Copenhagen's S-train network.

== History ==
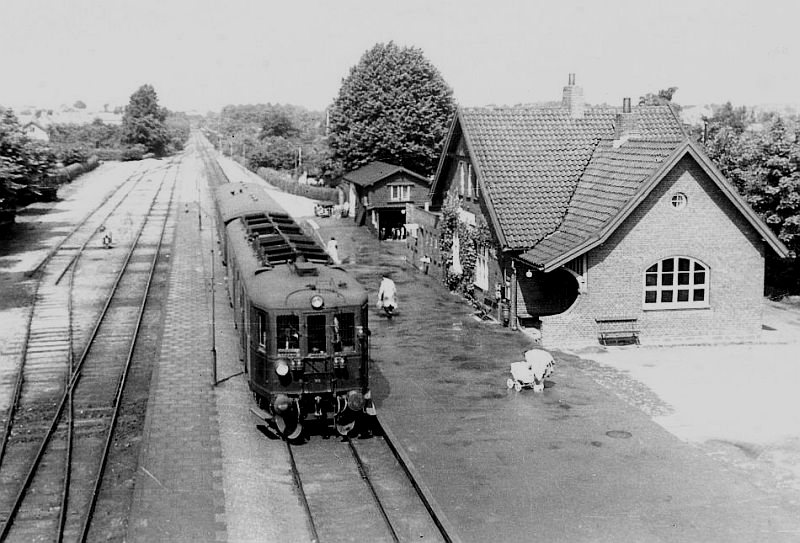
Vangede Station in 1953

Vangede Station was not one of the original stations of the Slangerup Line. It was created in 1906 and the first station building was a red brick building designed by Heinrich Wenck. It was demolished shortly after a new station building opened in 1968 in connection with the preparation of electrification and conversion of the railway into an S-train line.

== In popular culture ==
The station is used as a location in the films Sønnen fra Amerika (1957) and Landsbylægen (1961).

== See also ==
- List of Copenhagen S-train stations
- List of railway stations in Denmark
