= Dyssegård railway station =

Commuter railway station in Greater Copenhagen, Denmark

Dyssegård
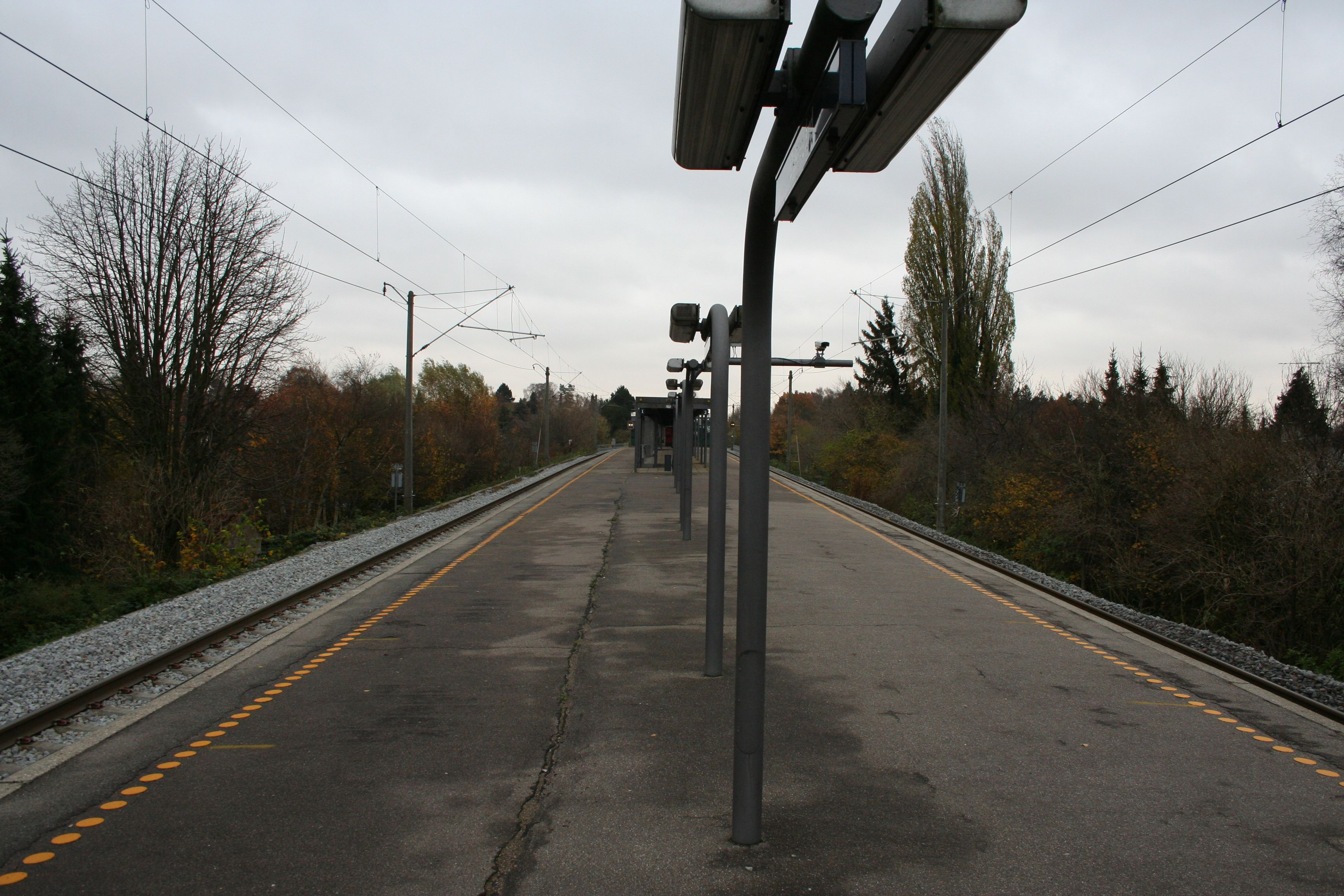
- Dyssegård station in 2008

General information
- Location: Dyssegårdsvej 38A; 2900 Hellerup; Gentofte Municipality; Denmark
- Coordinates: 55.7322°N 12.536°E
- Elevation: 22.0 metres (72.2 ft)
- Owner: DSB (station infrastructure); Banedanmark (rail infrastructure)
- Platforms: Island platform
- Tracks: 2

Services
Preceding station	S-train	Following station
Vangede towards Farum	B	Emdrup towards Høje Taastrup
Vangede towards Buddinge	Bx Peak hours	Emdrup towards Høje Taastrup
Location

Dyssegård station is a suburban rail railway station on the Farum radial of the S-train network in Copenhagen, Denmark.

== History ==
The station opened on 22 May 1932. In March 2014, the Danish Traffic Agency (Trafikstyrelsen) proposed a closure of the station as a result of its relatively low passenger numbers.

== See also ==
- List of Copenhagen S-train stations
- List of railway stations in Denmark
