= Emdrup =

Neighbourhood of Copenhagen, Denmark

Coordinates: 55.7229°N 12.5356°E

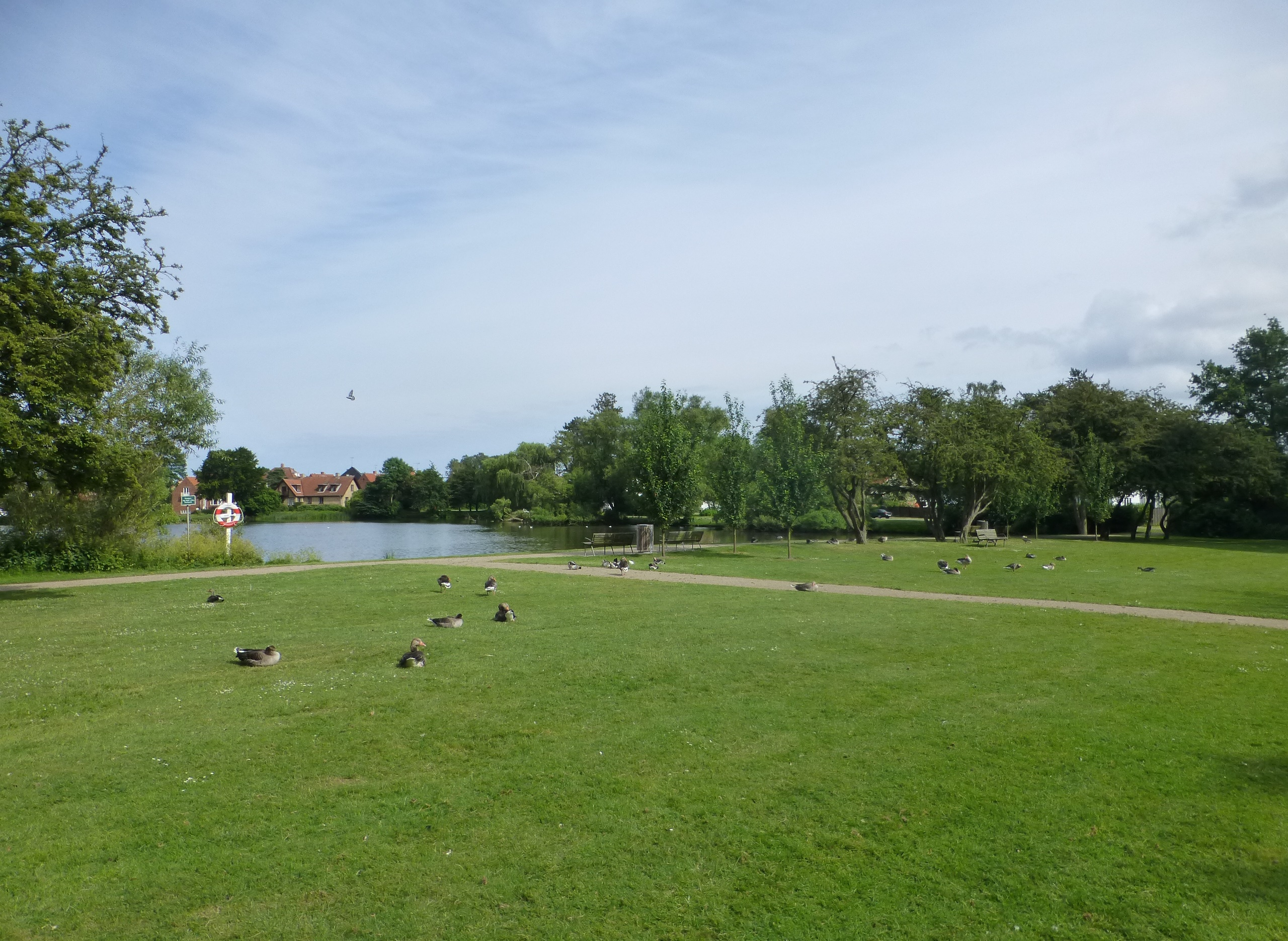
Emdrup Lake Park at Lake Emdrup

Emdrup is a neighbourhood straddling the border between the Bispebjerg and Østerbro district of Copenhagen, Denmark. It is located between Utterslev Mose in the west and the Helsingør Motorway in the east, just south of the border with Gladsaxe and Gentofte municipalities. Emdrup is a mainly residential neighbourhood, boasting a combination of apartment buildings and areas with single-family detached home. Emdrup station is located on the Farum radial of the S-train system. AU Campus Emdrup, Aarhus University's Copenhagen campus, is situated just north of the station. The most important greenspaces are Lake Emdrup with its small lakeside park in the east, Utterslev Mose in the west and Emdrupparken with sport facilities in the north.

== History ==
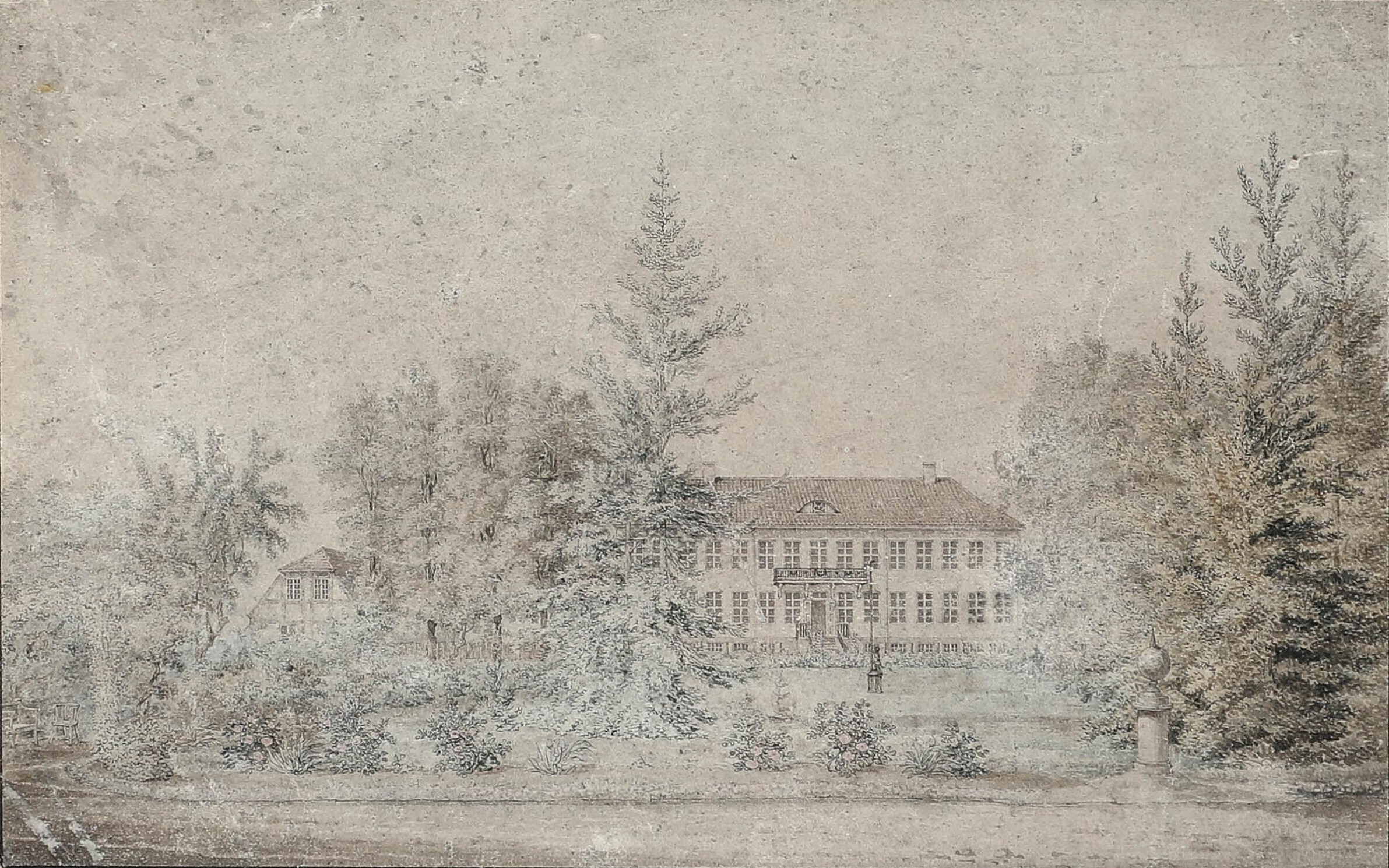
H. G. F. Holm:Emdrupgård seen from the garden (c. 1840)

Emdrup is first mentioned (in the firmer Imbrethorp) in a popal letter from 1186. The name is derived from the male name Imbre (originally meaning a person from Fehmarn) and the suffix -thorp. In 1718, Christian Møinichen established the country house Emdrupgård. Emdrup began to grow in the late 19th century. It belonged to the civil parish of Brønshøj which was merged with Copenhagen in 1901.

In 1943, the first Adventure Playground in the world, opened in Emdrup, inspired by the Danish landscape architect Carl Theodor Sørensen and in cooperation with the Copenhagen schoolteacher Hans Dragehjelm. The playground inspired child-care workers all over the world and is still in operation.

== Education ==
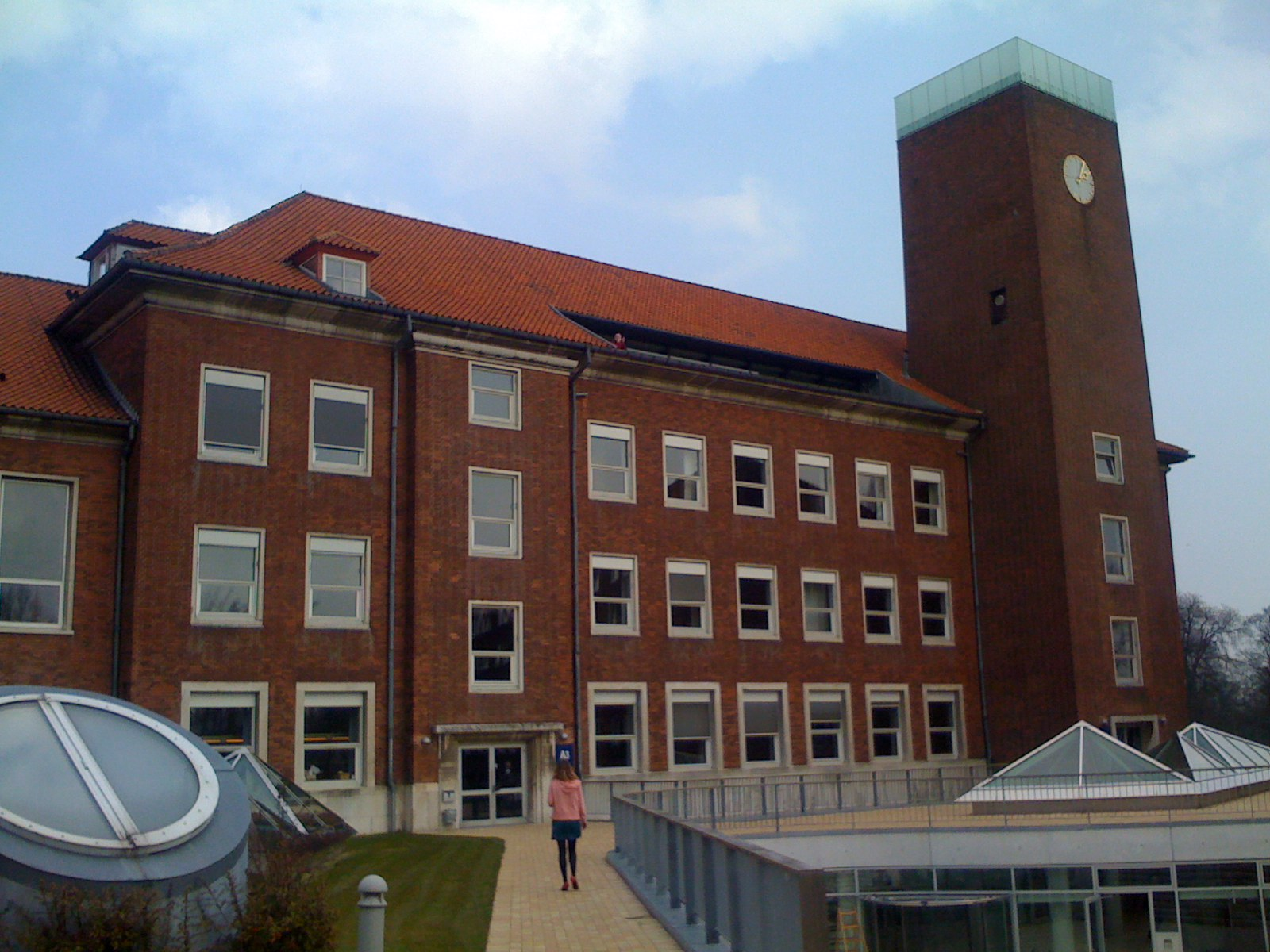
AU Campus Emdrup, a department of Aarhus University.

Aarhus University's AU Campus Emdrup is located at the intersection of Tuborgvej and Emdrupvej, just north of Emdrup station and west of Lake Emdrup.. It was created when the Danish University of Education was merged with the university in 2007 and us currently under expansion. Copenhagen Technical College also has a campus in Emdrup.

Emdrup School on Lersø Parkallé (No. 5) was built in 1939-43.

The Danish School of Media and Journalism had a campus in Emdrup, known as The Media School (Mediehøjskolen, formerly Den Grafiske Højskole).

== Sports ==
In 1921, KFUMs Boldklub moved to Emdrupparken, where a new club house was built in 1943 to design by the architect Arne Jacobsen. KFUM was one of several small Copenhagen clubs that founded the Alliancen association.

Emdrup Hallen (Nøkkerosevej 23) is an indoor sports venue from 2009. It is mainly used for handball and badminton.

== Other landmarks ==
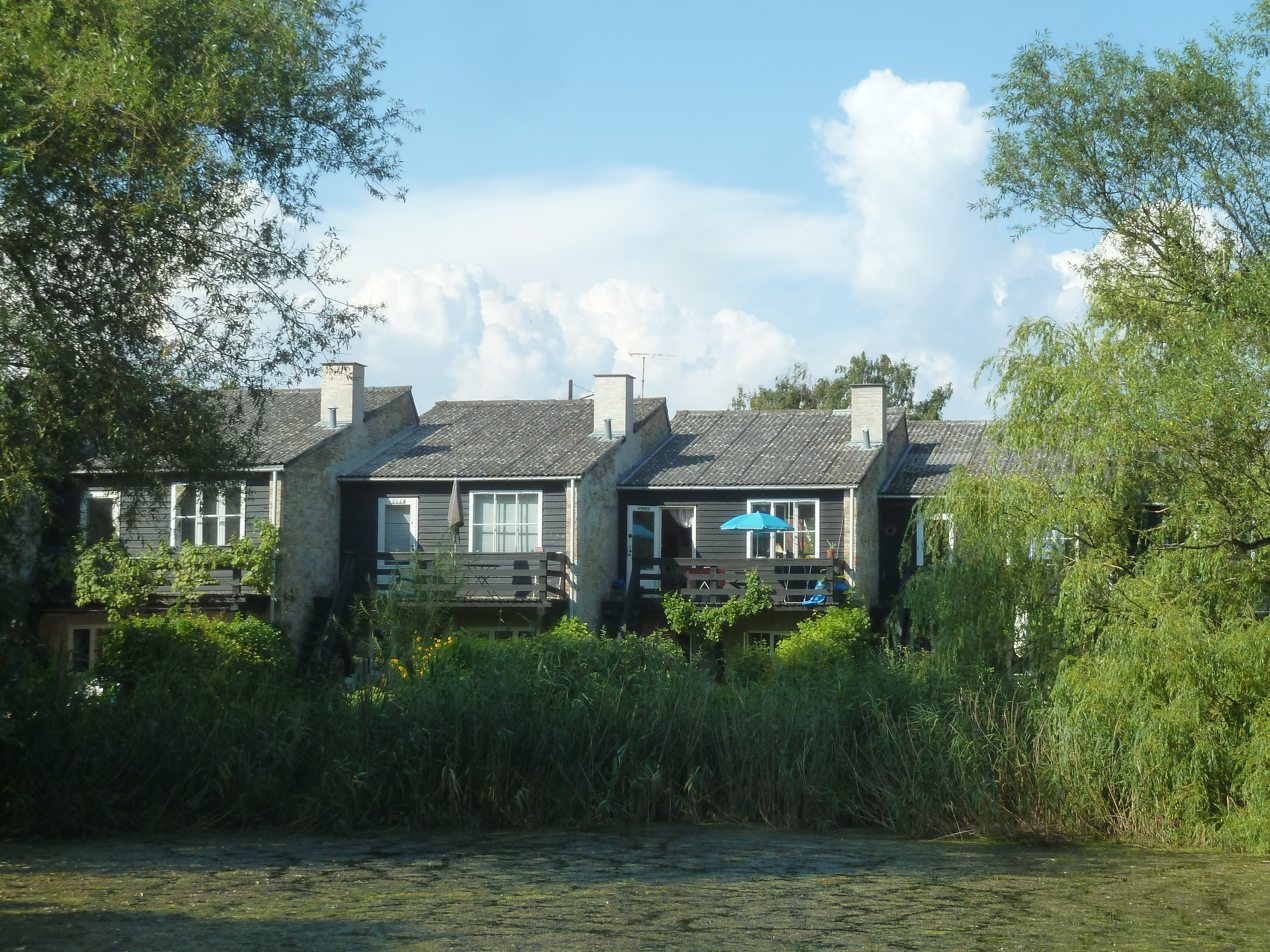
Atelierhusene, a series of terraced houses.

Atelierhusene (literally "The Studio Houses"), also known as Kunstnerbyen (literally "The Artists' Town), is a development of terraced housing dedicated to provide affordable living and working space for artists. It is located on the east side of Utterslev Mose and consists of three terraces, each with 7 houses, surrounding a small green space with a lake. The former country house Søholm is situated on the north shore of Lake Emdrup (in Gentofte Municipality). It is from 1807 and was designed by Christian Frederik Hansen who also designed Church of Our Lady, Copenhagen Court House and the second Christiansborg Palace. Håndværkerforeningen's charitable housing development Haandværkerhaven was designed by Henning Hansen after he won an architectural competition in 1936. Emdrup Church is from 1961 and was designed by Christian N. Christiansen.

== Parks and open spaces ==
Lake Emdrup is located in the eastern part of Emdrup. It was created when a dam was constructed in about 1550 to improve the water supply to Copenhagen.

== Transport ==
Emdrup station is located on the Farum radial of the S-train network. It is served by the B and Bx trains. The Helsingør Motorway and Tuborgvej, part of the Ring 2 ring road, are the main arteries in the area.
