= Kunstnerhjemmet =

Coordinates: 55.6852°N 12.5706°E

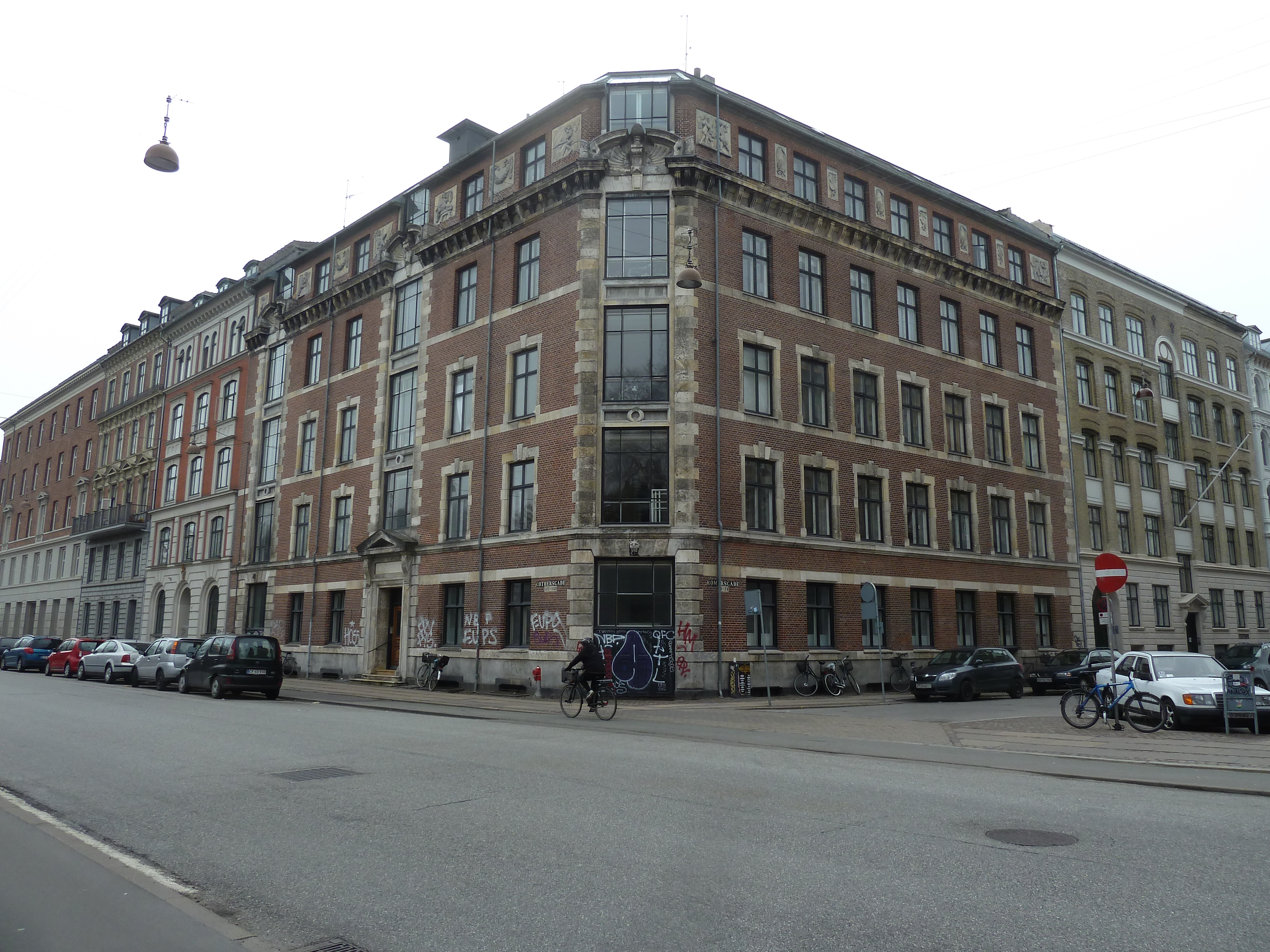
Kunstnerhjemmet

Kunstnerhjemmet (lit. "The Artists' Home") on Gothersgade, opposite the Botanical Garden, in Copenhagen, Denmark, was built in the 1870s to provide affordable accommodation and studio facilities for artists. Founded at the initiative of Ferdinand Meldahl, the association behind its construction later also acquired a building on nearby Bartolinsgade. The apartments in the two buildings are open to young, emerging artists as well as aging ones and their widows.

== History ==
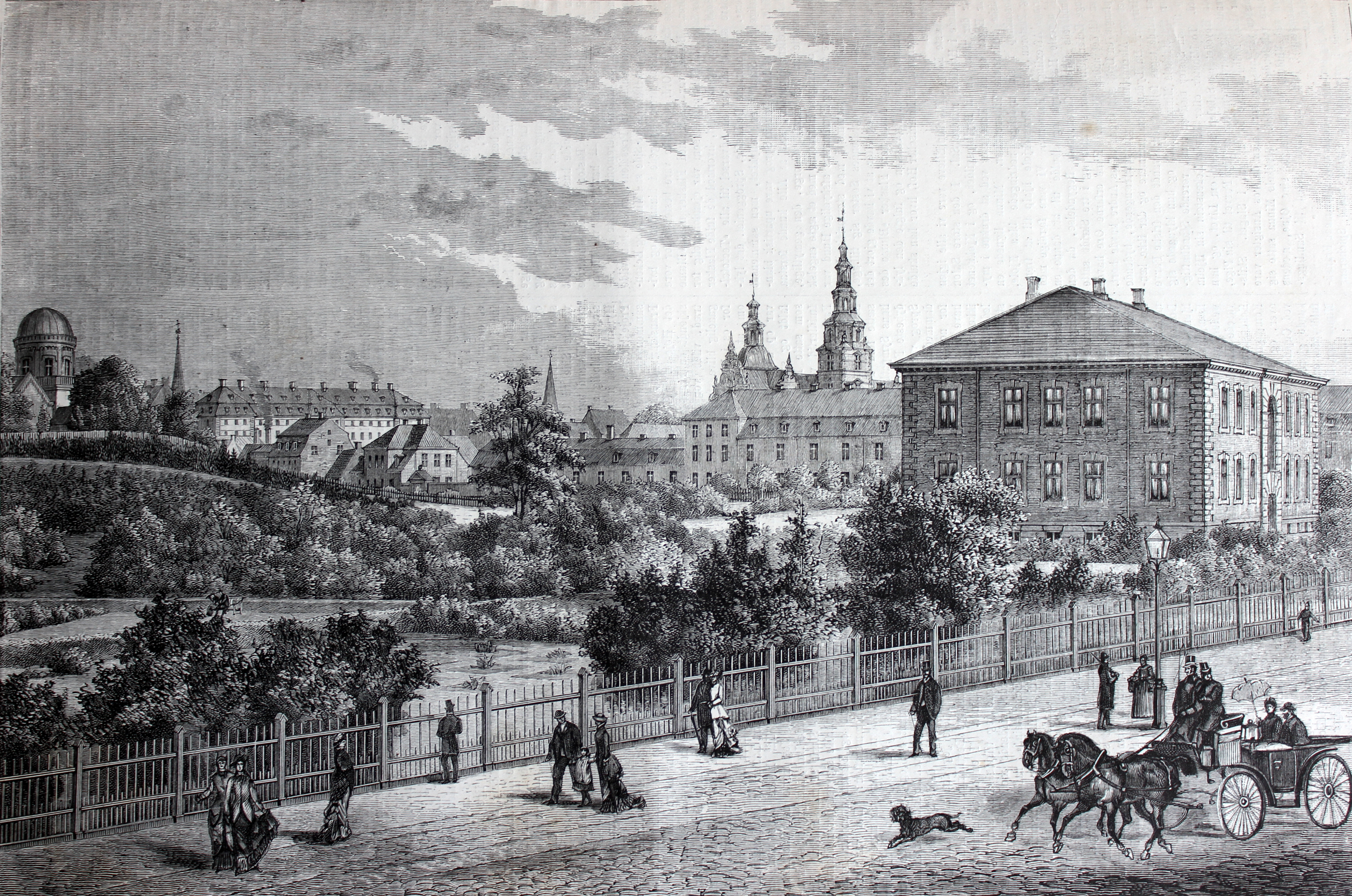
Kunstnerhjemmet in Gothersgade, drawing by C. V. Nielsen published in Illustreret Tidende on 23 January 1881 Kastellet

The Artists' Home is located within the so-called Fortification Ring, where Copenhagen's Bastioned Fortifications ran until they were decommissioned and dug away in the 1950s. The architect Ferdinand Meldahl was a key figure in its redevelopment as well as in the extension of Gothersgade as part of his Søtorvet scheme. He also took the initiative to found the association which was responsible for the construction and running of the Artists' Home. The association was founded on 23 January 1873. Its first chairman, as proposed by Meldahl, was Ole Berendt Suhr and after his death in 1875 the post was taken over by Lauritz Peter Holmblad. Meldahl personally served as vice chairman. Other members were the flower painter William Hammer and the architectural painter Heinrich Hansen, both personal friends of Meldahl. A long line of established artists donated works which were sold to raise money for the projects although the largest contributions came from the two first chairmen and other peers.

The architect Henrik Hagemann agreed to design the building without payment. Construction began in 1877 and was completed the following year.

In 1958, the Association for Acquisition of Residences for Artists purchased the nearby property Bartolinsgade 7. Its architect is unknown but it was completed in 1880.

== Architecture ==
The building is five storeys tall and forms part of a closed block bounded by Gothersgade, Rømersgade, Linnégade and Israels Plads. It has six bays on Gothersgade a corner bay and seven bays on Rømersgade. Two bays on Gothersgade as well as the corner bay have large studio windows. Decorative elements include chambranles, a series of reliefs between the windows of the top floor, a cornice supported by corbels beneath it. The façade on Rømersgade is somewhat more simple than the one on Gothersgade. The building was listed in 1987.

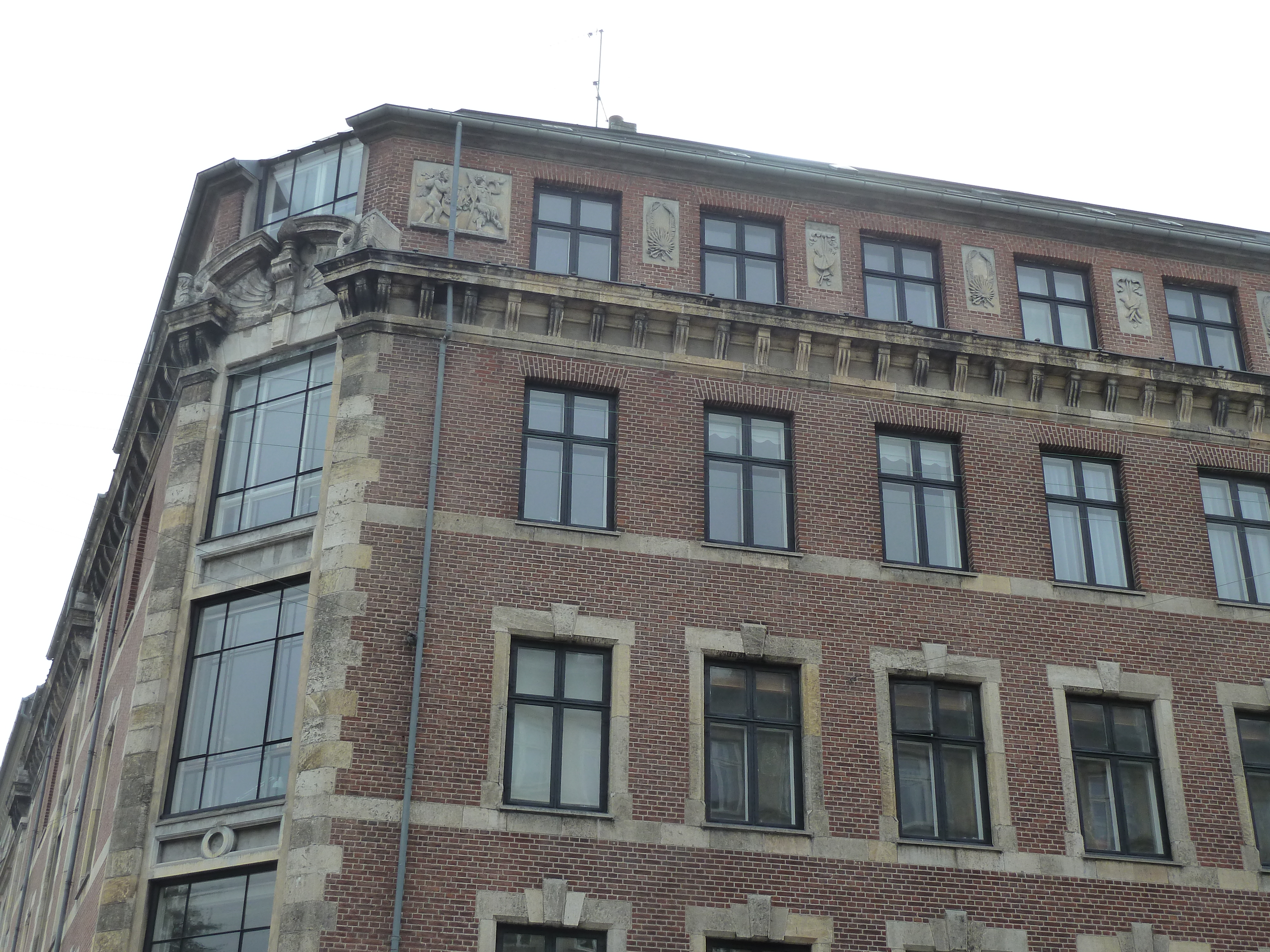
The façade on Rømersgade

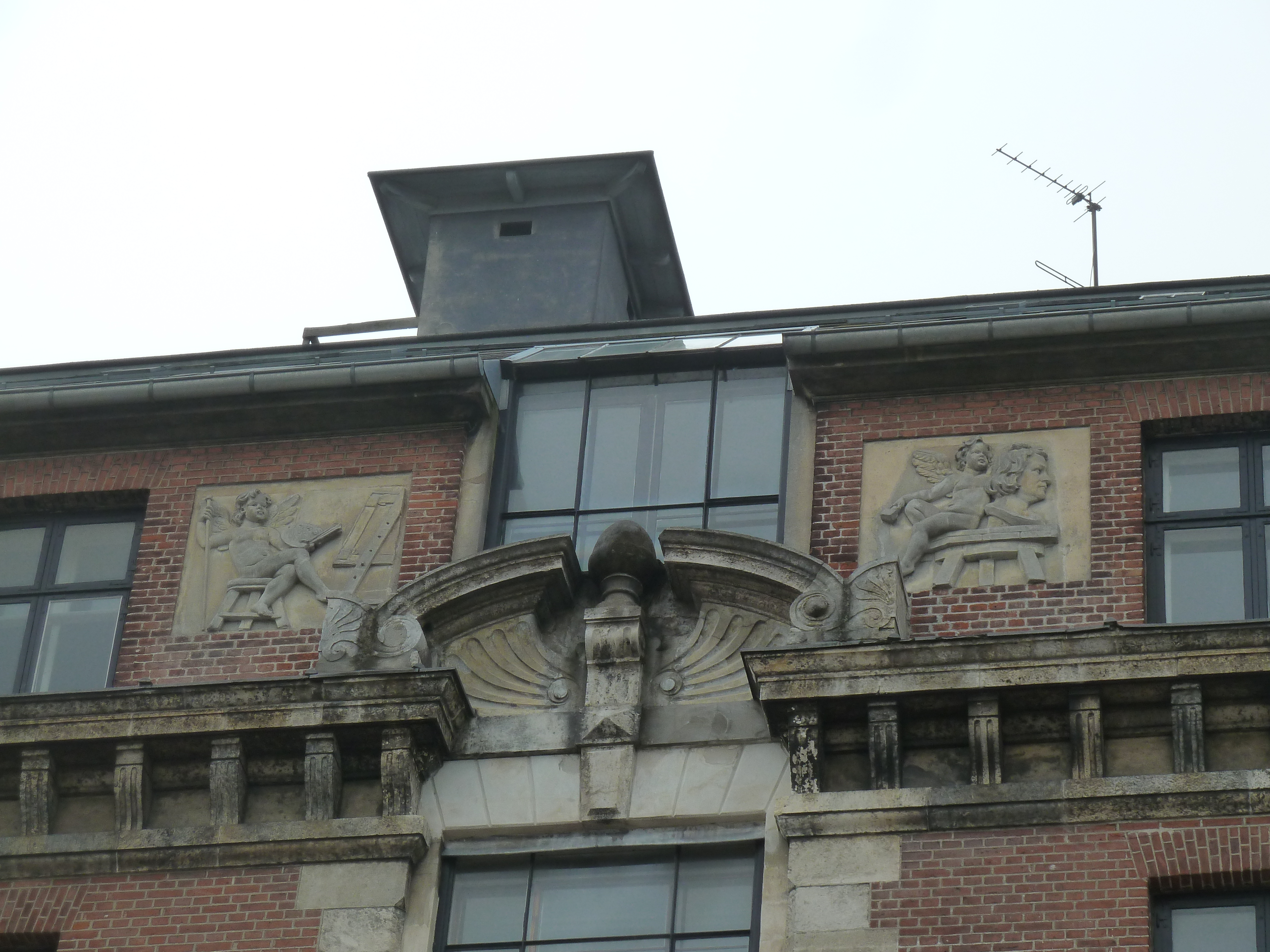
Decorations beneath the roof

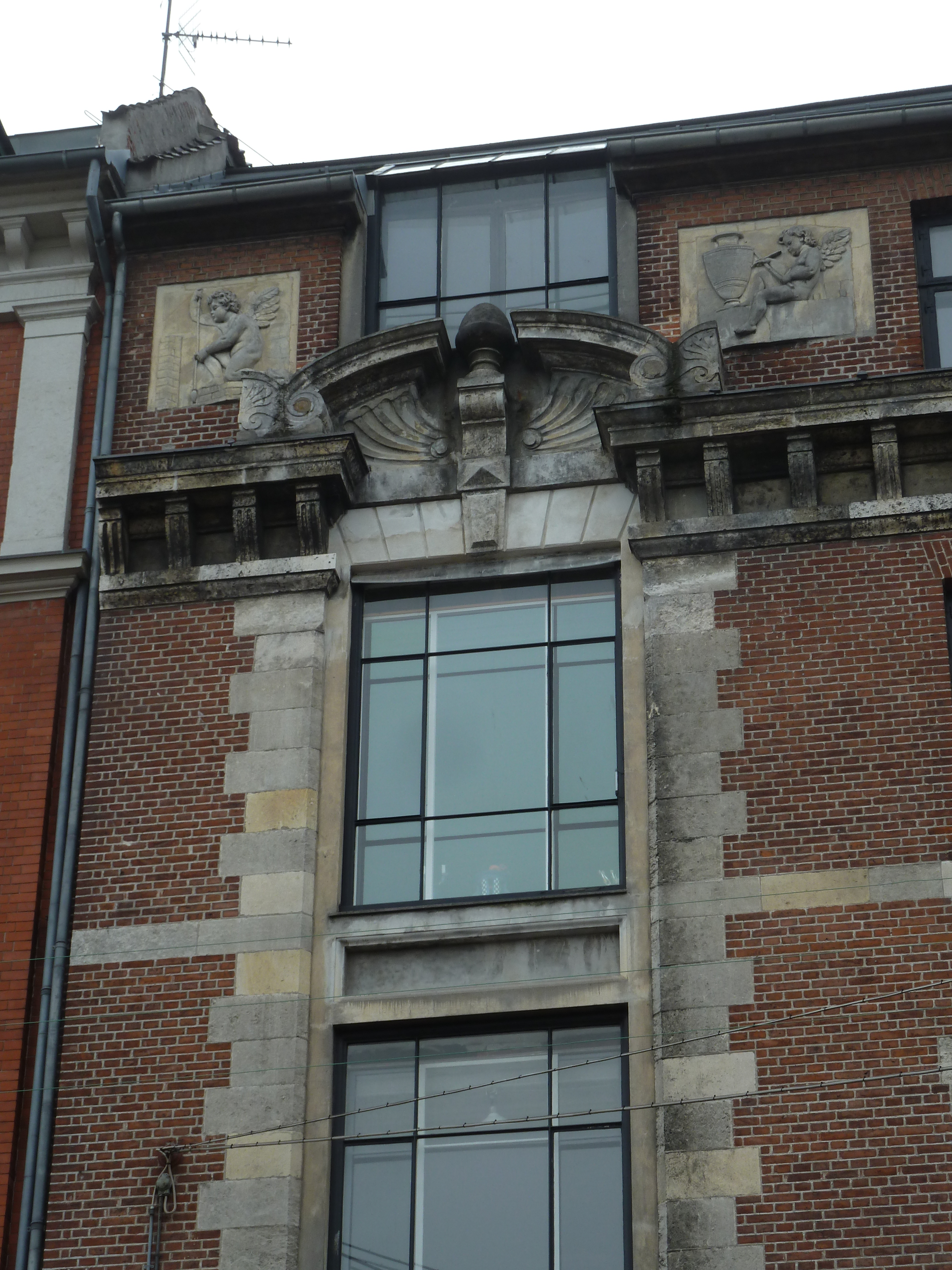
The large studio windows

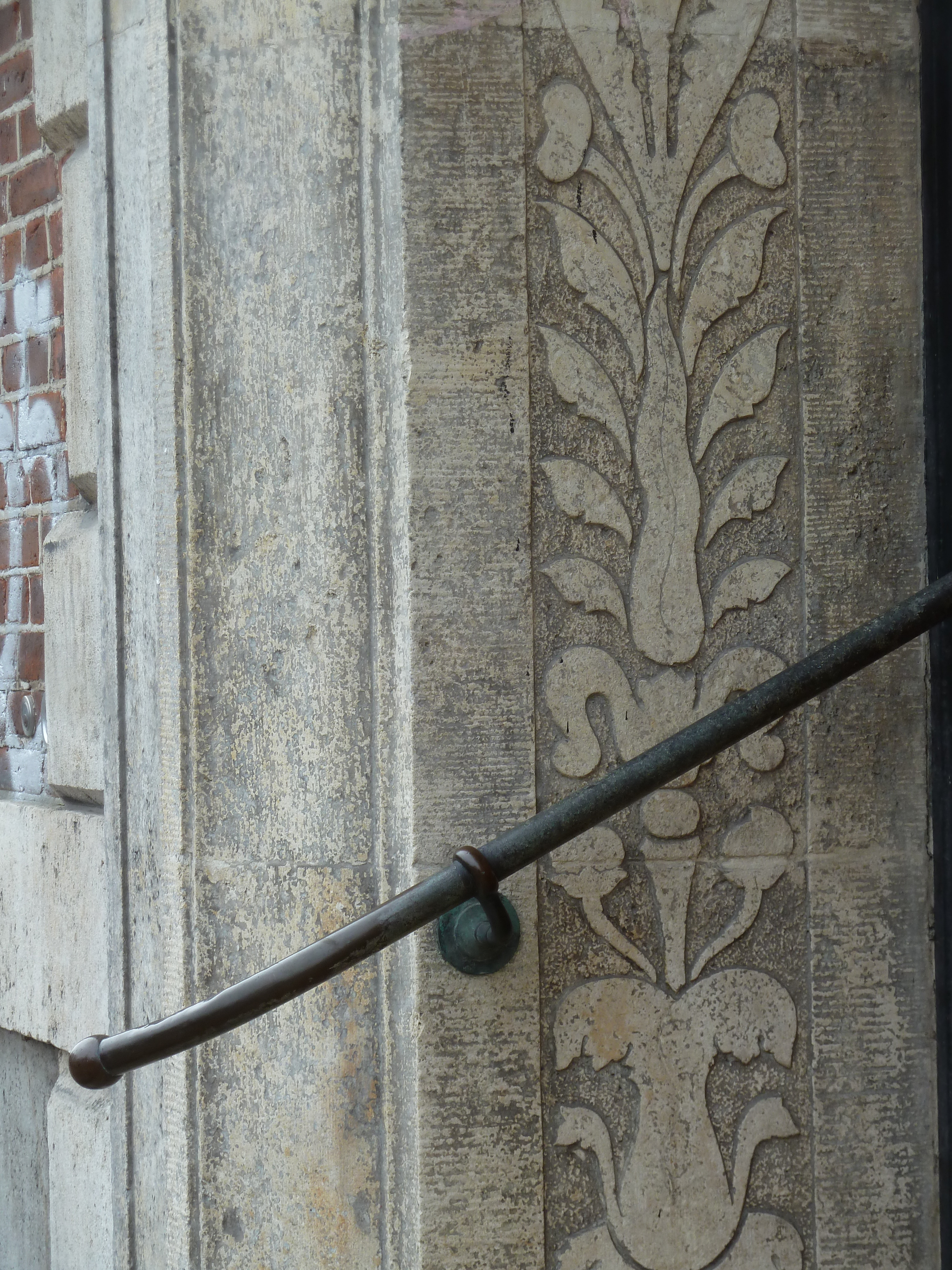
Decorations on the door frame

== See also ==
- Atelierhusene.
