= Utterslev Mose =

Boglands in Copenhagen and Gladsaxe, Denmark

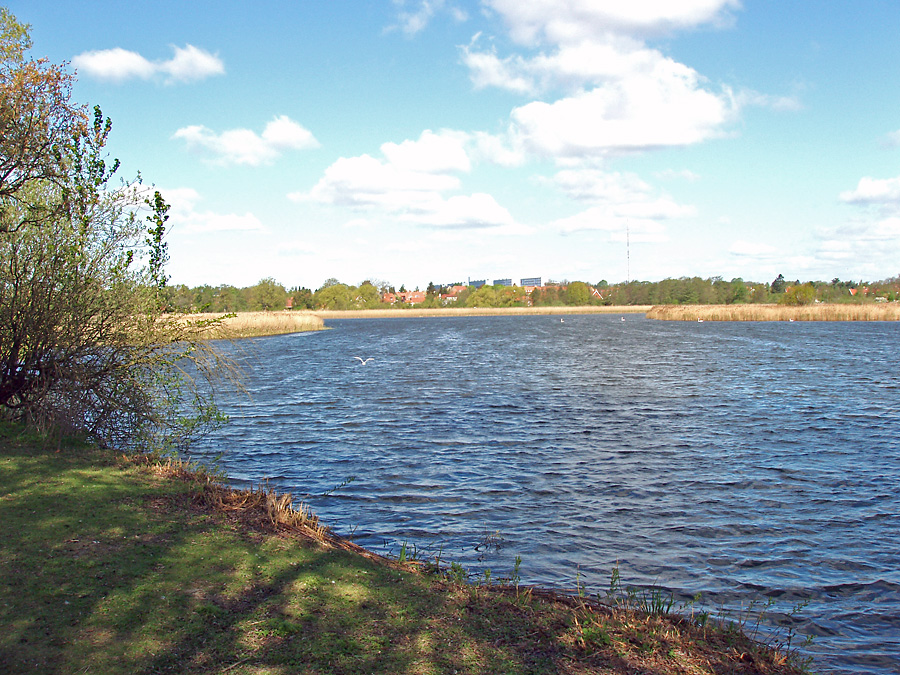
- One of the central lakes
- Interactive map of Utterslev Mose
- Type: Semi-natural area
- Location: Copenhagen, Denmark
- Coordinates: 55°43′00″N 12°30′20″E
- Area: 200 hectares (490 acres)
- Created: 1948
- Status: Open all year

Utterslev Mose (English: Utterslev Boglands) is a large semi-natural area of lakes, reed beds and parkland located on the border between Copenhagen and Gladsaxe municipalities, approximately six kilometers northwest of central Copenhagen, Denmark. It is surrounded by the neighbourhoods Brønshøj, Tingbjerg, Utterslev, Søborg and Emdrup. It is known for its rich bird life and has a dense network of walking and cycling trails.

== History ==
Utterslev Mose was originally one big, shallow-watered lake which formed at the end of the last ice age and later developed into bogland. It was used in Copenhagen's water supply from the 16th century until 1849. It has also been used for peat harvesting.

Utterslev Mose was formally part of the West Wall a defensive line around Copenhagen that was part of the fortifications of Copenhagen. The west wall was closed in 1920 and turned into a recreational area.

Utterslev Mose was converted into a nature park between 1939 and 1943. Lakes were dug out, canals established and a number of reed islands created to provide nesting grounds for wild birds. The park was protected in 2000.

== Description ==
Utterslev Mose has an area of 200 hectares (221 ha if Kirkemosen to the south and Gyngemosen to the north are included) of which 97 hectares are covered by water. A circuit of the three lakes Vestmosen, Midtmosen and Østmosen as well as Højmosen in the northeastern corner is about nine kilometres long.

== Flora and fauna ==
Utterslev Mose has a large population of wild birds.

== See also ==
- Utterslev
