= Nyelandsvej =

Street in Copenhagen, Denmark

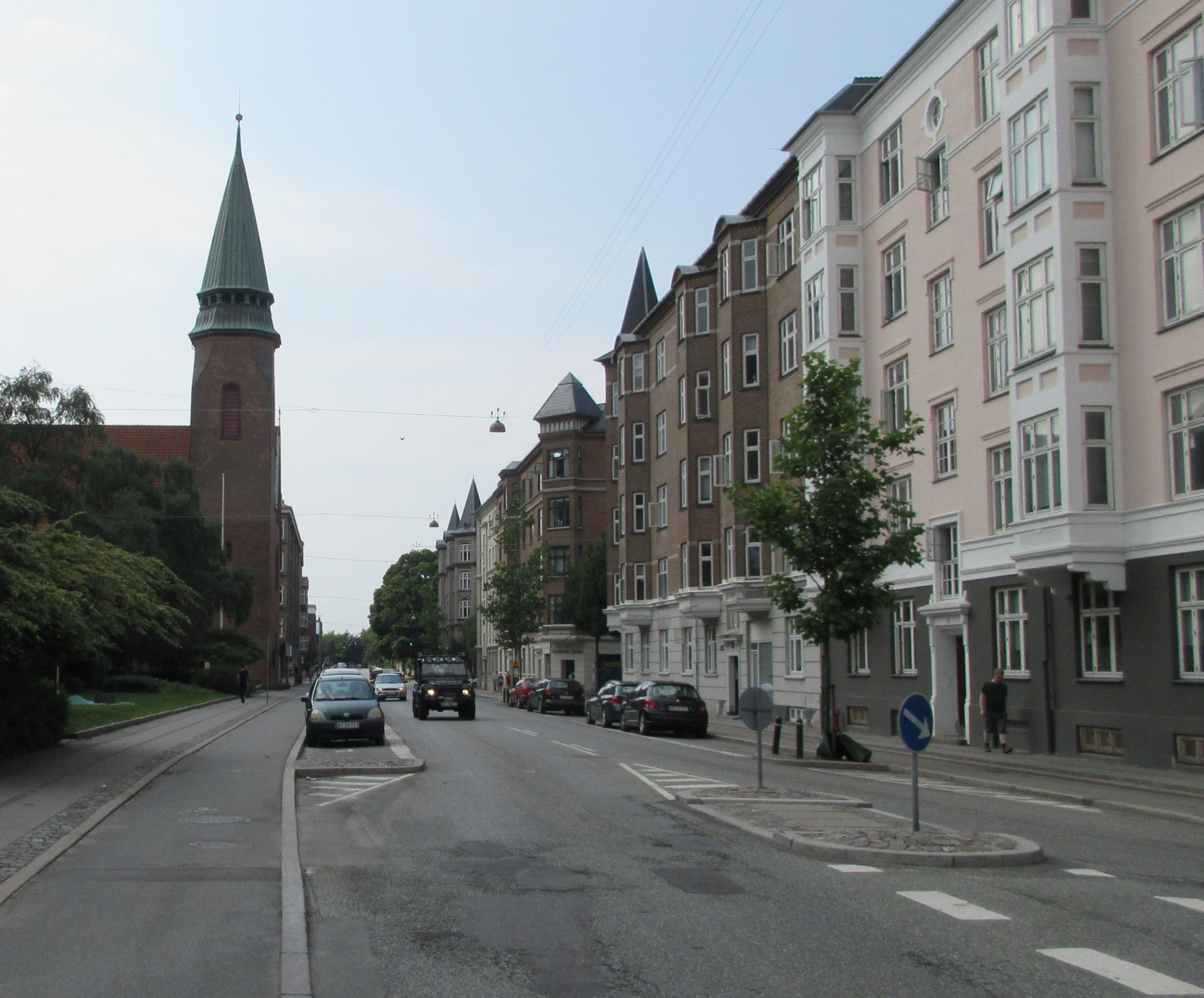
- Length: 1,360 m (4,460 ft)
- Location: Copenhagen, Denmark
- Quarter: Frederiksberg
- Nearest metro station: Frederiksberg
- Coordinates: 55°41′3.84″N 12°31′27.12″E
- Southeast end: Falkoner Allé
- Northwest end: Dalgas Boulevard

Nyelandsvej is a street in the Frederiksberg district of Copenhagen, Denmark. It runs from Falkoner Allé in the southeast to a roundabout at the north end of Dalgas Boulevard in the northwest. The more urban, eastern part of the street, between Falkoner Allé and Nordre Fasanvej, separates an area with Copenhagen Business School's Solbjerg Campus and Frederiksberg Centret to the south from the Svømmehal Quarter to the north. The western part of the street passes the multi-purpose venue Keddelhallen and Frederiksberg Hospital before entering an area with single-family detached homes. The street is named for Stephan Peter Nyeland (1793–1875), provisionmaster (proviantforvalter) at the Naval Administration (Søetaten), who from 1837 to 1875 owned a country estate on Falkonér Allé on which part of Nyelandsvej, Langelandsvej and Bentzonsvej were built.

== History ==
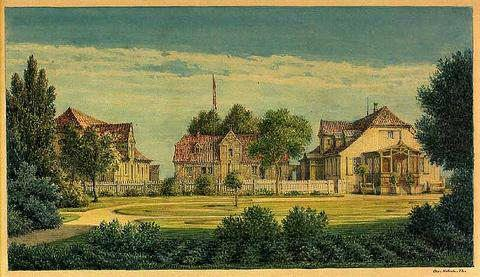
Nyland's country house painted by Christian Hetsch in 1872

In 1814, Rasmus Langeland (1767-1837) bought 22 tønder land from the Sindshvile estate. He used it for the construction of a country house for his own use. After his death, it was acquired by his son-in-law Stephan Peter Nyeland (1793-1875). He established part of the streets Nyelandsvej, Langelandsvej and Bentzonsvej. Langelandsvej was named after his wife Anne Kirstine Langeland (1798-1823).

Myelandsvej was extended in 1883–84. The name Nyelandsvej was officially adopted as a public road name on 17 April 1994. The section Nordre Fasanvej-Nyelands Plads was called Bergersvej until 1900.

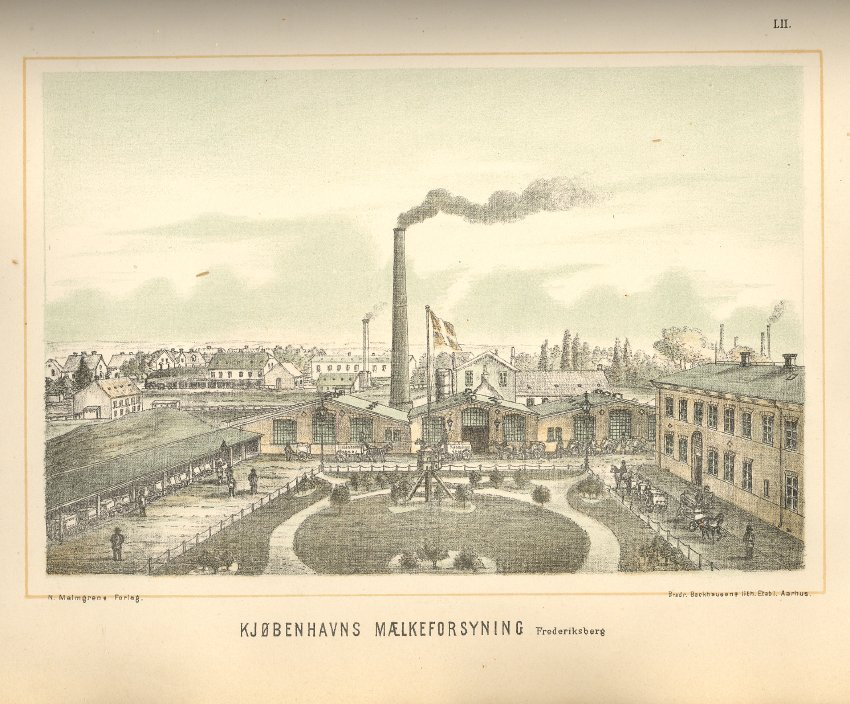
Kjøbenhavns Mælkeforsyning, c. 1888

Københavns Mælkeforsyning ("Copenhagen's Milk Supply"), whose name was later changed to Solbjerg Majeri (Solbjerg Dairy), opened on the street at No. 25 in 1884. Its old buildings were replaced by new ones in the 1920s and it developed into one of the largest employers in Frederiksberg. It had direct access to Frederiksberg Station's goods yard. The dairy closed in the mid-1970s.

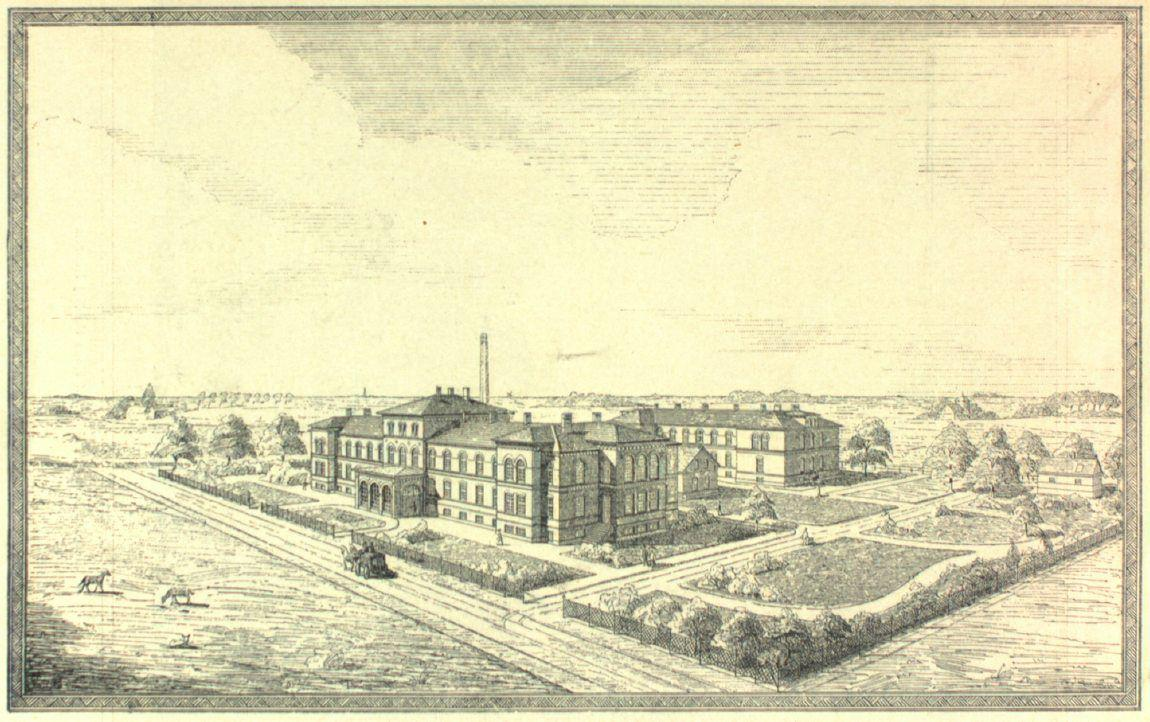
Copenhagen County Hospital, circa 1895

The street section west of Nordre Fasanvej was also established in 1884 but was called Bergersvej until 1900. Copenhagen County Hospital (Københavns Amts Sygehus) was built on the north side of the road in the 1890s. The buildings became part of Frederiksberg Hospital when Copenhagen County Hospital completed its move to Gentofte in 1939.Frederiksberg Incineration Plant opened on the other side of the street in 1903.

== Notable buildings and residents ==
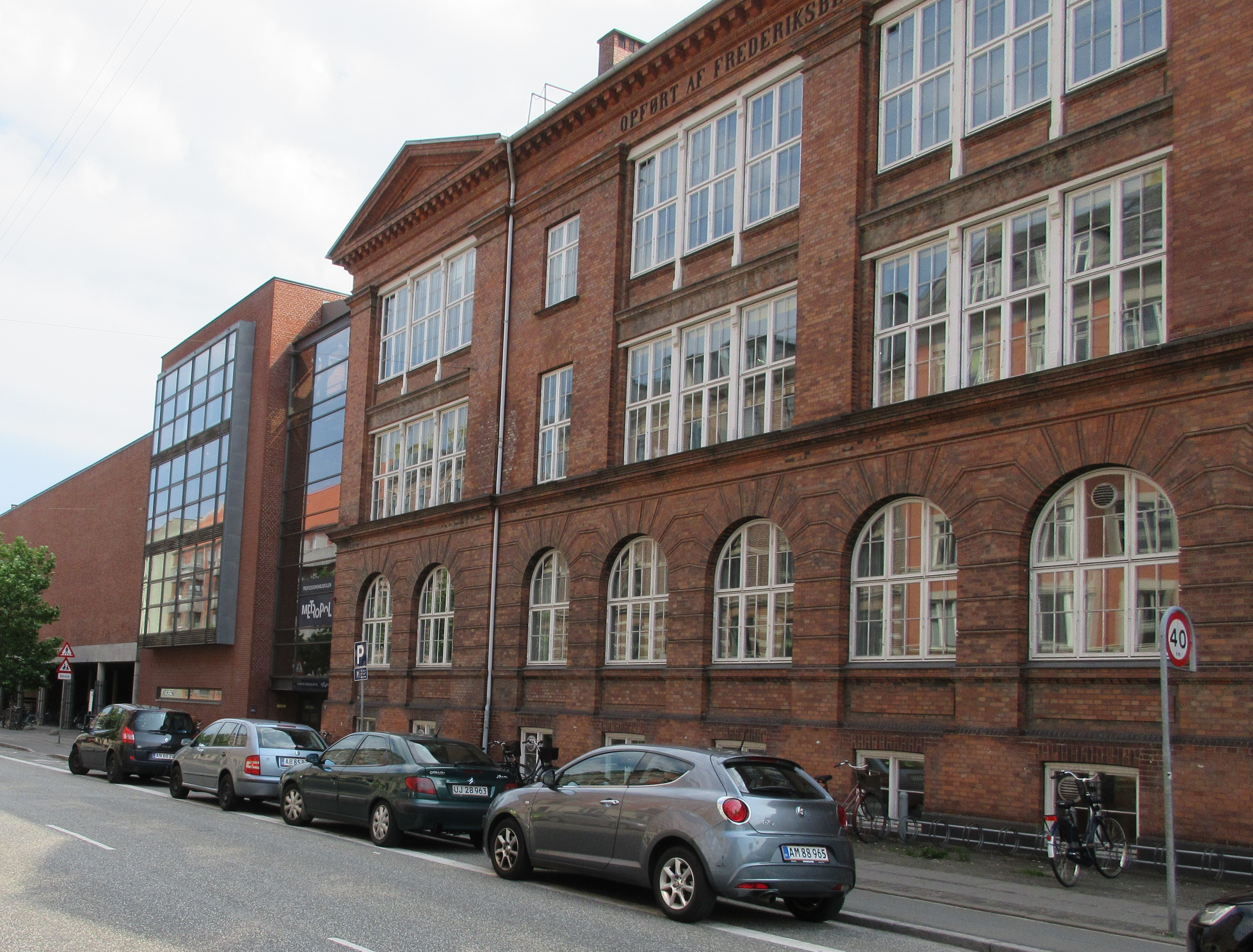
Metropolitan UC's building on Nyelandsvej

Skolen på Nyelandsvej ("The School on Nyelandsvej") at No. 23. is a public primary school. It was built in 1891–92 to design by Christian Laurits Thuren.

No. 27 is the former home of Frederiksberg Seminarium and now houses Metropolitan University College's Department of Education and Learning.

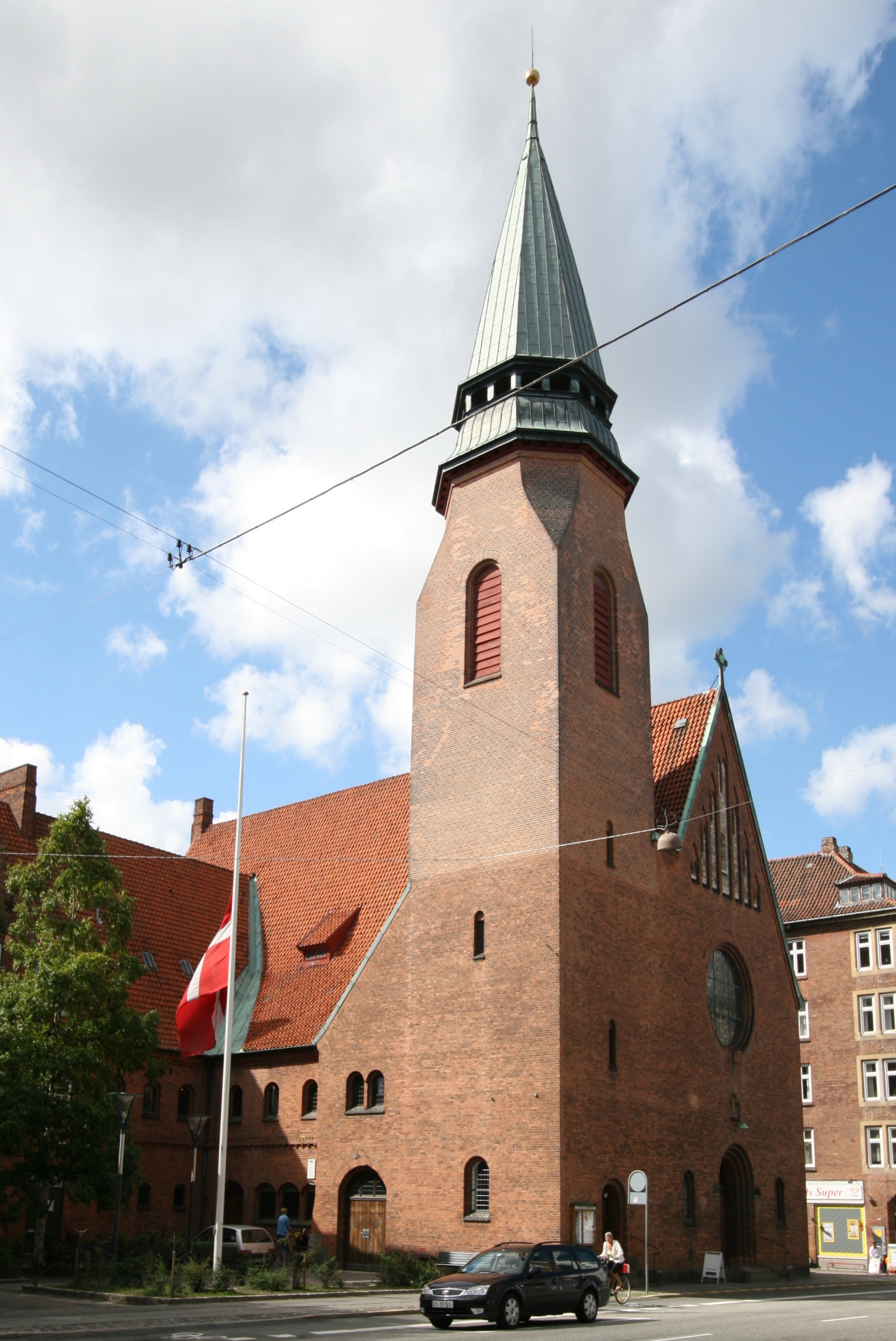
Godthaab Church

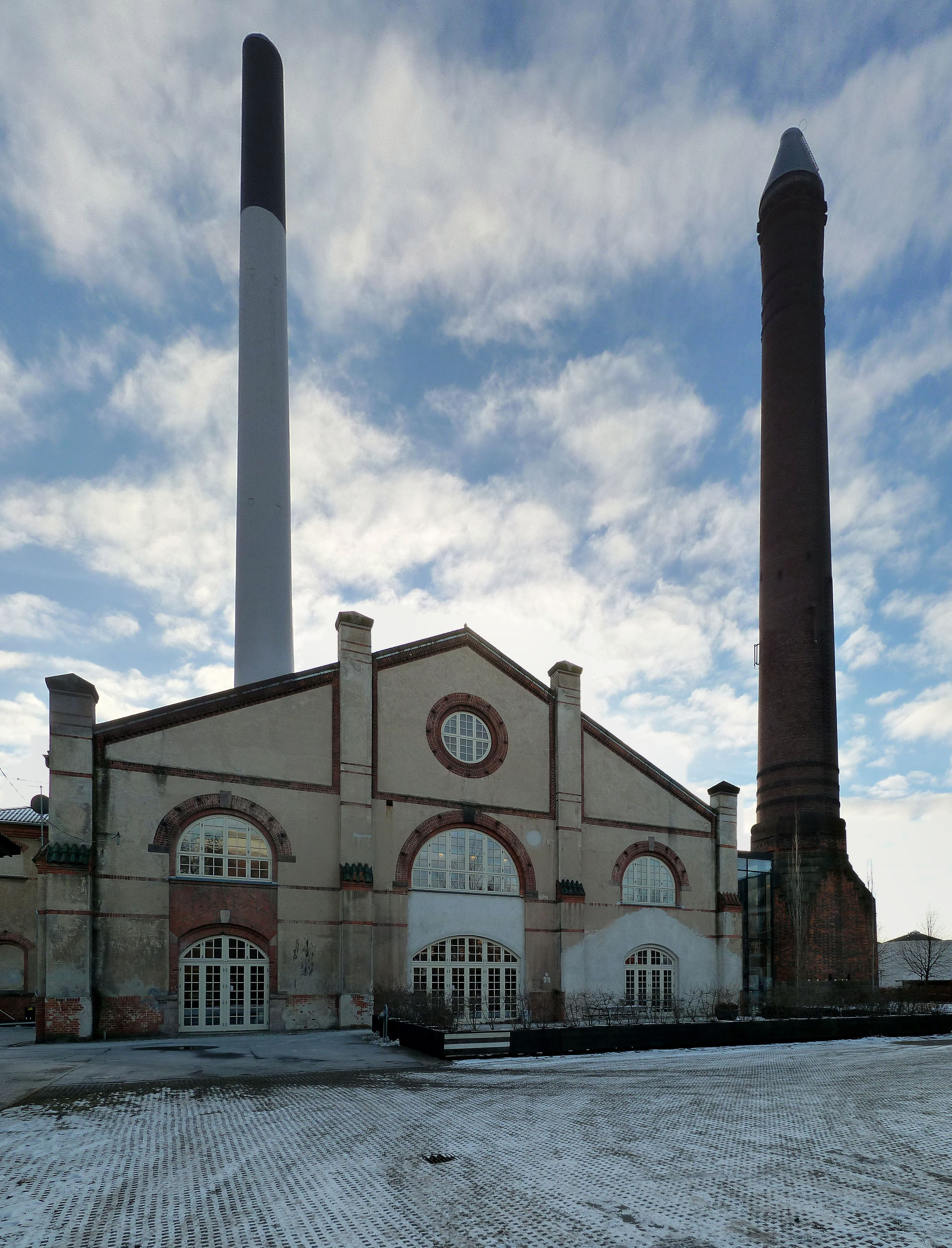
Keddelhallen

The Godthaab Church (No. 51) was inaugurated in 1911. Designed by Gotfred Tvede, it is part of a complex which also included Godhaab Parish's day care center (Godthåbs Sogns Menigheds Børnehave) and General Classens Asyl. The adjacent residential building (Nyelandsvej 53-63/Nordre Fasanvej 48) was built from 1913 by Arbejdernes Andels-Boligforening from a design by Viggo Thalbitzer and is one of the first examples of a public housing estate in Denmark.

The multi-purpose venue Keddelhallen occupies the surviving buildings of Frederiksberg Incineration Plant. They were adapted for their current use in 2001.

== Transport ==
Fasanvej Station is situated just south of the intersection with Nordre Fasanvej. It is served by the M1 and M2 lines of Copenhagen Metro.
