= Heinrich Wenck =

Danish architect (1851–1936)

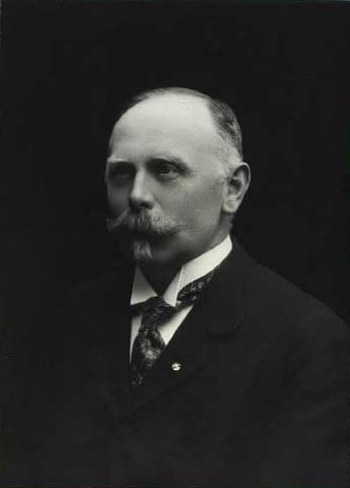
- Born: 10 March 1851; Aarhus, Denmark
- Died: 3 February 1936 (aged 84); Charlottenlund, Denmark
- Occupation: Architect
- Buildings: Copenhagen Central Station

Signature
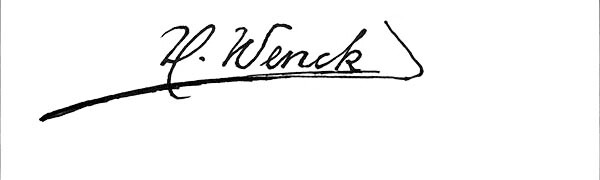

Heinrich (Henry) Emil Charles Wenck (10 March 1851 – 3 February 1936) was a Danish architect, known for the numerous railway stations he designed in his capacity of chief architect for the Danish State Railways from 1894 to 1921. During the years Wenck held the post, the railway network in Denmark experienced a strong expansion and he designed around 150 stations of which 15 are listed today. Among these are Copenhagen Central Station and the Øresund Railway stations which are examples of his National Romantic and Historicist styles. From 1903 he was a titular professor at the Royal Danish Academy of Fine Arts in Copenhagen.

== Biography ==
Heinrich Wenck was born on 10 March 1851 in Aarhus to Theodor Wenck, a military officer and later general à la suite who worked for the Danish road services, and his wife née Pacht. He attended the Royal Danish Academy of Fine Arts from 1869 studying under Ferdinand Meldahl and Christian Hansen, graduating in 1876. In 1878 he won the Academy's small gold medal for a project for a library in Neo-Gothic style and received a travel scholarship which took him to Italy from 1883 to 1885.

From 1882 Wenck was employed by the Danish State Railways. He first worked under chief architect Niels Peder Christian Holsøe but from 1891, when Holsøe was hit by an eye disease, he gradually took over more of his responsibilities with title of First Architect, before succeeding him as Chief Architect in 1894. His first major assignment was Helsingør railway station which he designed in collaboration with Holsøe. It was inaugurated on 24 October 1891.

From 1895 to 1897 he worked on the stations for the Øresund Railway which connected Copenhagen to Helsingør. They are designed in a fabulating National Romantic style which draws on inspiration from Martin Nyrop. Wenck did not just design the stations proper but also a number of related buildings, such as carriage houses, offices, housing for workers, switchmen's houses, warehouses and lavatories. With many of the stations, his approach was that of Gesamtkunst to the effect that he also designed the signs, door handles, chandeliers and painted frescos. The stations won him the Eckersberg Medal in 1898.

Wenck retired from the State Railways in 1921 and was succeeded by Knud Tanggaard Seest. He died in 1936

== Selected works ==
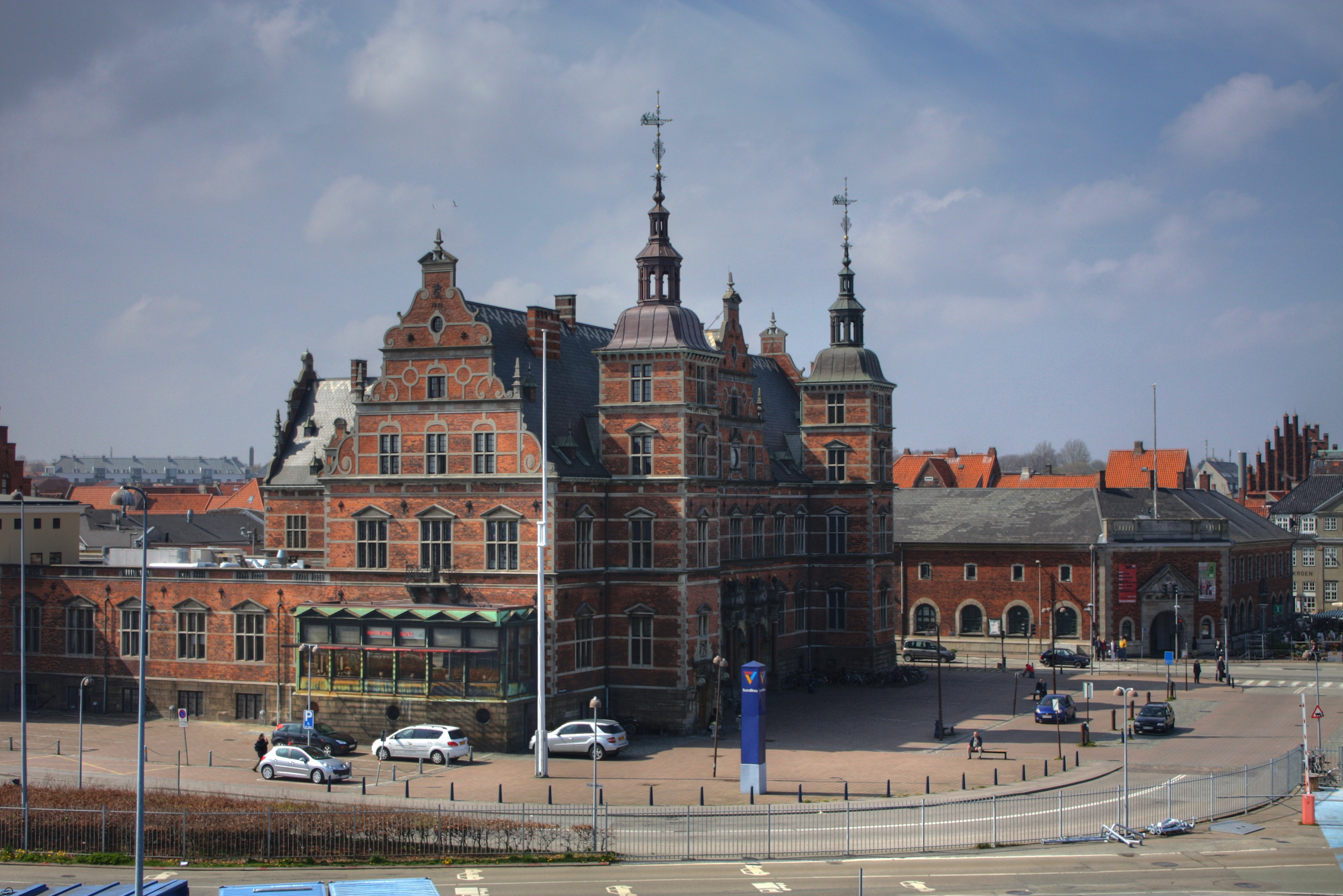
Helsingør Station, 1891

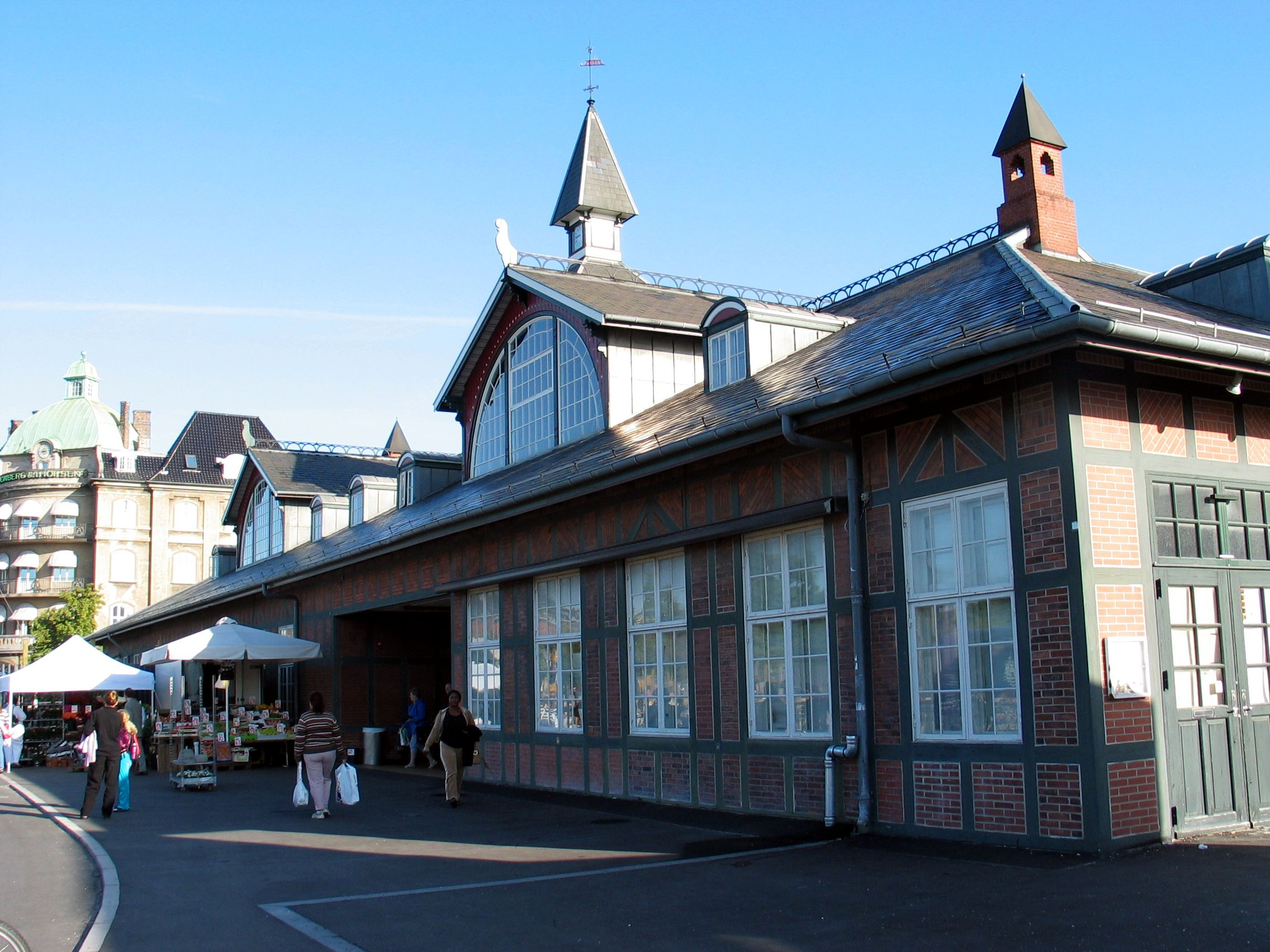
Østerport Station, 1897

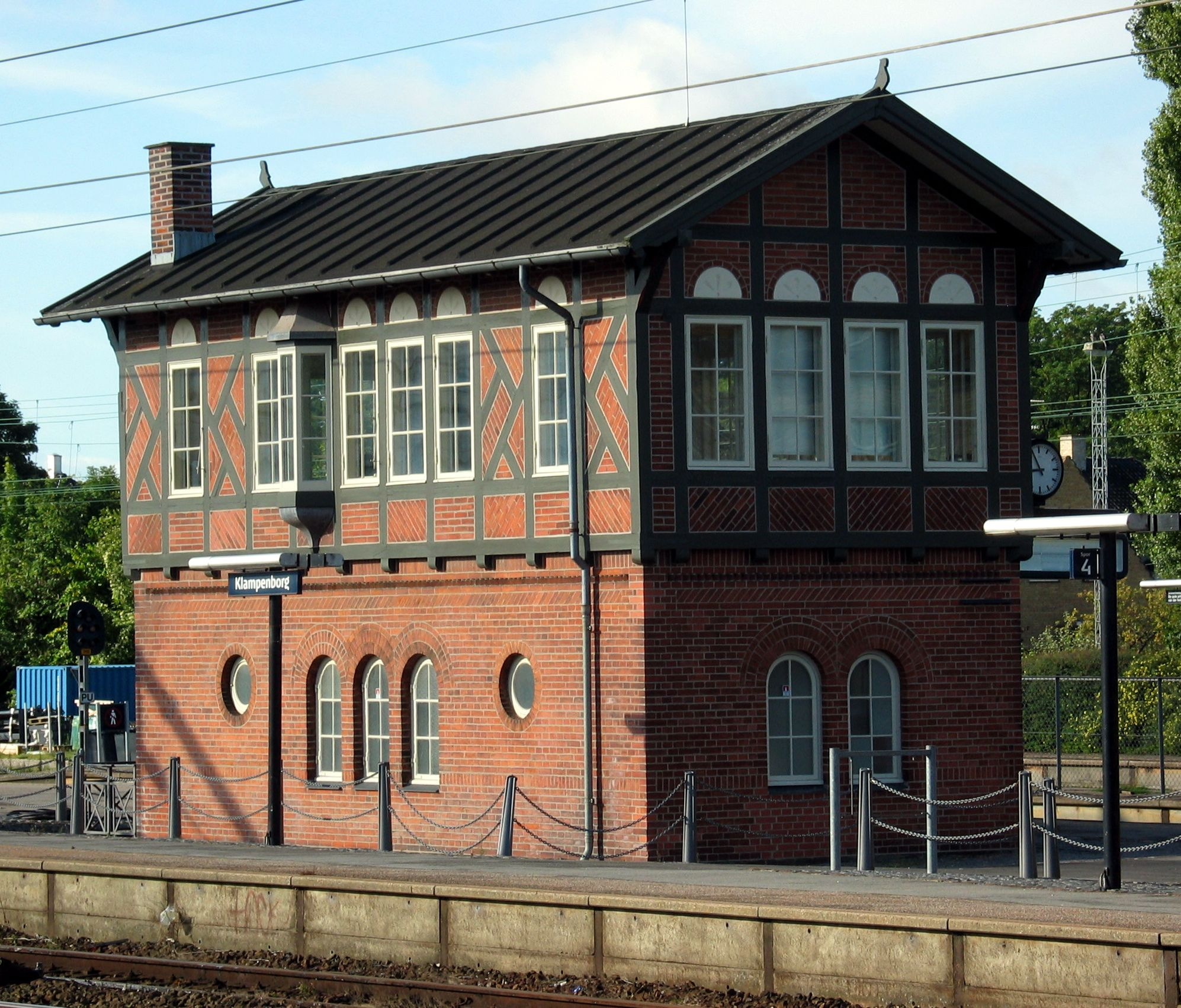
Klampenborg Station, 1897

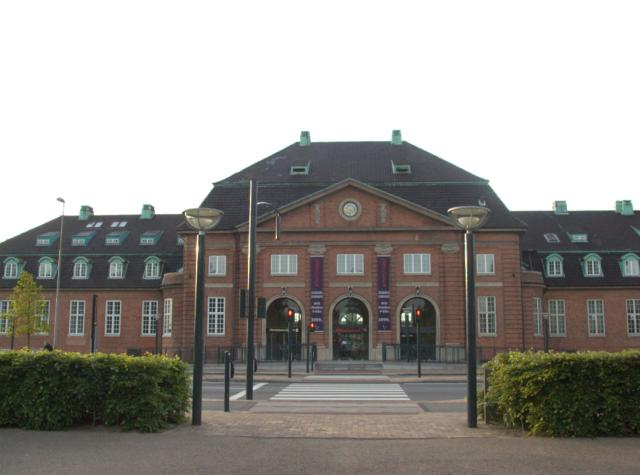
Odense Old Central Station

- Buildings for Østsjællandske Jernbaneselskab (1879)
- Gribskov Railway stations (1879–80)
- Helsingør Station, Helsingør (1889–91, with N.P.C. Holsøe, listed in 1992)
- Lyngby Station (II) (1890–91, with N.P.C. Holsøe, demolished in 1956)
- Slagelse-Næstved Railway stations (1891–92)
- Skælskør Railway stations (1891–92)
- Frihavnens Station, Copenhagen (1895, extended by Wenck in 1900, restored in 1986, dismantled in 2001 and rebuilt on Amerikas Plads in 2005)
- Øresund Railway stations (1895–97)
- Østerport Station (1894–97)
- Copenhagen Goods Station, Copenhagen (1895–1901, demolished in 1968)
- Græsted-Gilleleje Railway stations (1896)
- Holte Station rebuilding (1900)
- Københavns Goods Terminal, Otto Busses Vej (1901 og 1907)
- Villa Søbæk, 394 Strandvejen, Espergærde (1902)
- Esbjerg Banegård (II) (1902–04, listed)
- Sorø Customs House and Post Office, Sorø (1903)
- Gedser Station (II) (1903)
- Frederiksberg Incineration Plant (now Keddelhallen), Frederiksberg (1903)
- Holstebro Station (II) (1904, listed in 1990)
- Copenhagen Central Station (III) (1904–12, rebuilt several times, including in 1977-80 by Dissing + Weitling, listed in 1983, water tower and signal posts demolished)
- Strømmen Station (1905, nedlagt, listed in 2006)
- Stevnstrup Station (II) (1905, nedrevet 1979)
- Korsør Station (II) and Customs House (1905–06, listed in 1992)
- Vipperød Station (1906)
- Nørresundby Station (1906–07, listed)
- Amager Railway stations (1906–07): Amagerbro Station (nedrevet 1938), Øresundsvej Trinbræt, Engvej Trinbræt (nedrevet), Kastrup Station, Tømmerup Station (nedrevet 1968), Store Magleby Station (nedrevet), Dragør Station (vandtårn og remise nedrevet)
- Tietgensbroen, Copenhagen (1907–09, rebuilt several times)
- DSBs Central Workshops, Copenhagen (1907–10)
- Herfølge Station (1908, listed)
- Resenbro Station (1908)
- Nørre Åby Station, Nørre Åby (1909, listed)
- Copenhagen Central Post Building, Tietgensgade, Copenhagen (1909–12)
- Administration building for DFDS Central Workshops, Aarhus (1910, with Povl Baumann)
- Vesterfælledvej Station and pedestrian bridge (1911, nedrevet 1984)
- Valby Station (1911, closed pedestrian bridge demolished)
- Stenløse Station, Stenløse (1912)
- Odense Central Station, Odense (II) (1912–14, demolished)
- Stations on the Ørsaa-Asaa-line (1914): Asaa Station m.fl.
- Engesvang Station (1914)
- Grejsdal Station (II) (1914–15, demolished in 1977)
- Vinderup Station (1915)
- Hornbæk-Gilleleje Railway stations (1915–16)
- The stations on the Funder-Bramming line (1915–17)
- The Stations on the Bramming-Grindsted-line (1916): Grindsted Station m.fl.
- Kokkedal Station (II) on Kystbanen (1916)
- Svendborg Station extension, Svendborg (1916)
- Grindsted-Brande Railway stations (1917)
- Hedehusene Station (1917)
- Taastrup Station (1917–18, demolished in 1979)
- Vejen Station (II) (1917, listed)
- Gilleleje Station, Gilleleje (1918)
- Glostrup Station (1918–19)
- Aarhus Goods Terminal, Aarhus (1918–23)
- Water tower, Grindsted Station (1919)
- Jernbaneskolen, Hellerup, now Københavns Amts Tale- og Høreinstitut, Rygårds Allé 45 (1919–20, rebuilt)
- Aarhus Goods Station (1920–22) Administration wing towards Bernstoffsgade, Copenhagen Central Station, Copenhagen (1919–23, with K.T. Seest, listed)
- Østerport Goods Station, Copenhagen (1921)

== See also ==
- Danish architecture
- List of Danish architects
