= Frederiksberg Incineration Plant =

Plant in Copenhagen, Denmark

Coordinates: 55.6837°N 12.5212°E

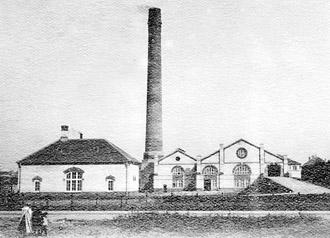
Frederiksberg Incineration Plant in c. 1910, still surrounded by open countryside

Frederiksberg Incineration Plant is a defunct incineration plant which was built in 1903 in the Frederiksberg district of Copenhagen, Denmark. It was located at Nyelandsvej, next to Frederiksberg Hospital, just south-west of the intersection of Godthåbsvej and Nordre Fasanvej. The buildings complex now houses Keddelhallen, a venue for cultural and sports activities owned by Frederiksberg Municipality.

== History ==
In the late 19th century, Frederiksberg Municipality struggled with disposing of trash from its fast-growing population. Due to the lack of tips in the small independent municipality, household trash from the some 75,000 inhabitants accumulated and increasingly constituted a health hazard. The first facility of its kind in Denmark, Frederiksberg Incineration Plant was built in 1903 to a design by Heinrich Wenck, most known for his work as head architect for the Danish State Railways. The heat from the incineration was led via tunnels and tubes to nearby Frederiksberg Hospital, an orphanage and a poorhouse. The steam was used for driving the turbines in an electricity plant. A district heating plant was built at the site in the 1980s. The old buildings was decommissioned in 2000.

== Buildings ==
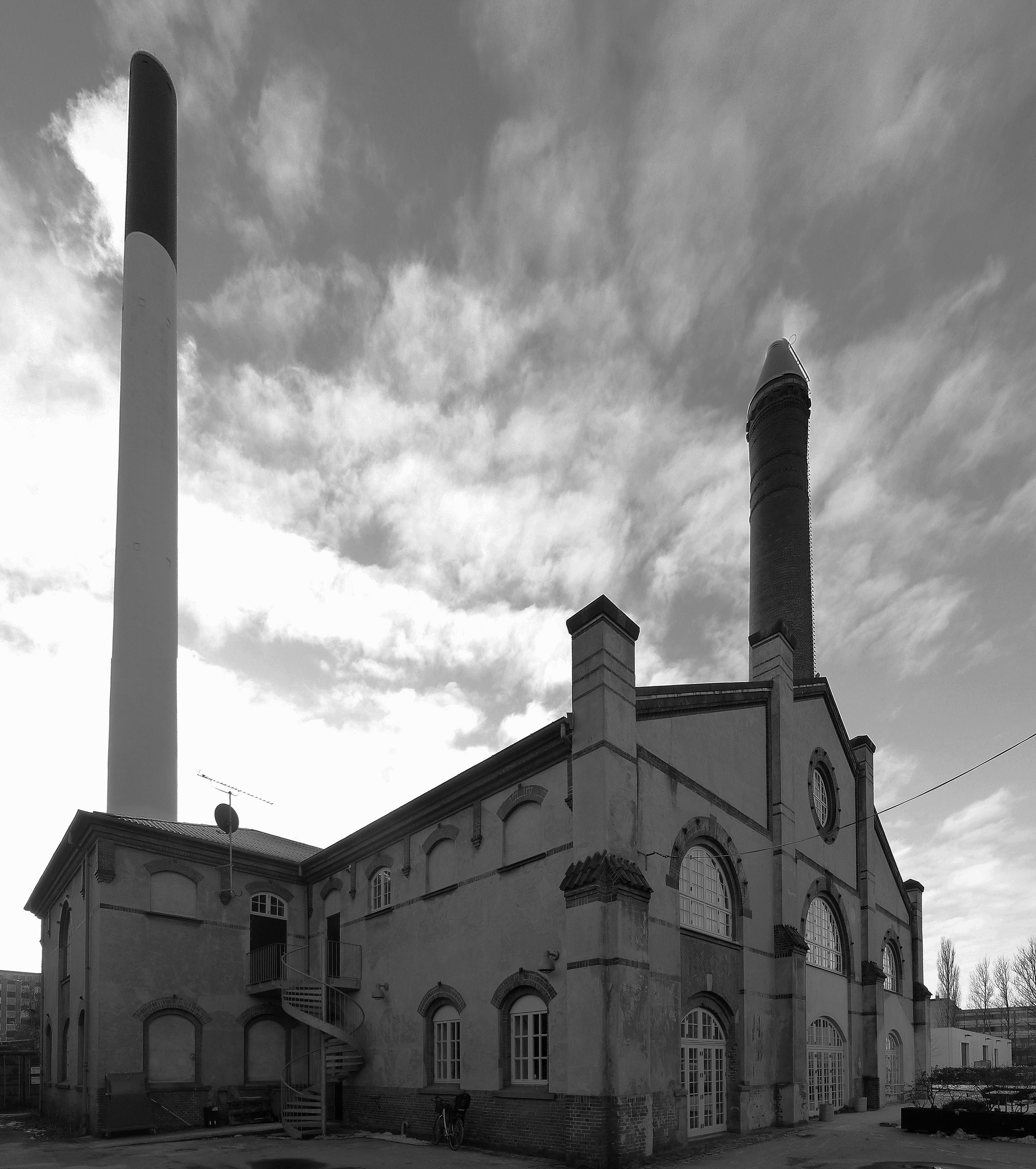
The buildings today

The plant originally consisted of several buildings. A single complex of interconnected volumes still exists today. It consists of the former electricity plant and a boilerhouse which are placed parallel but offset relative to each other. The 60 metres high brick chimney has also been retained at the site.

== The site today ==
The buildings are located at Nyelandsvej, next to Frederiksberg Hospital, just south-west of the intersection of Godthåbsvej and Nordre Fasanvej. In 2001 they were converted into Keddelhallen, a venue for cultural and sports activities owned by the municipality.

== See also ==
- Roskilde Gasworks
