= Copenhagen Central Post Building =

Building in Copenhagen, Denmark

Coordinates: 55°40′15″N 12°34′05″E

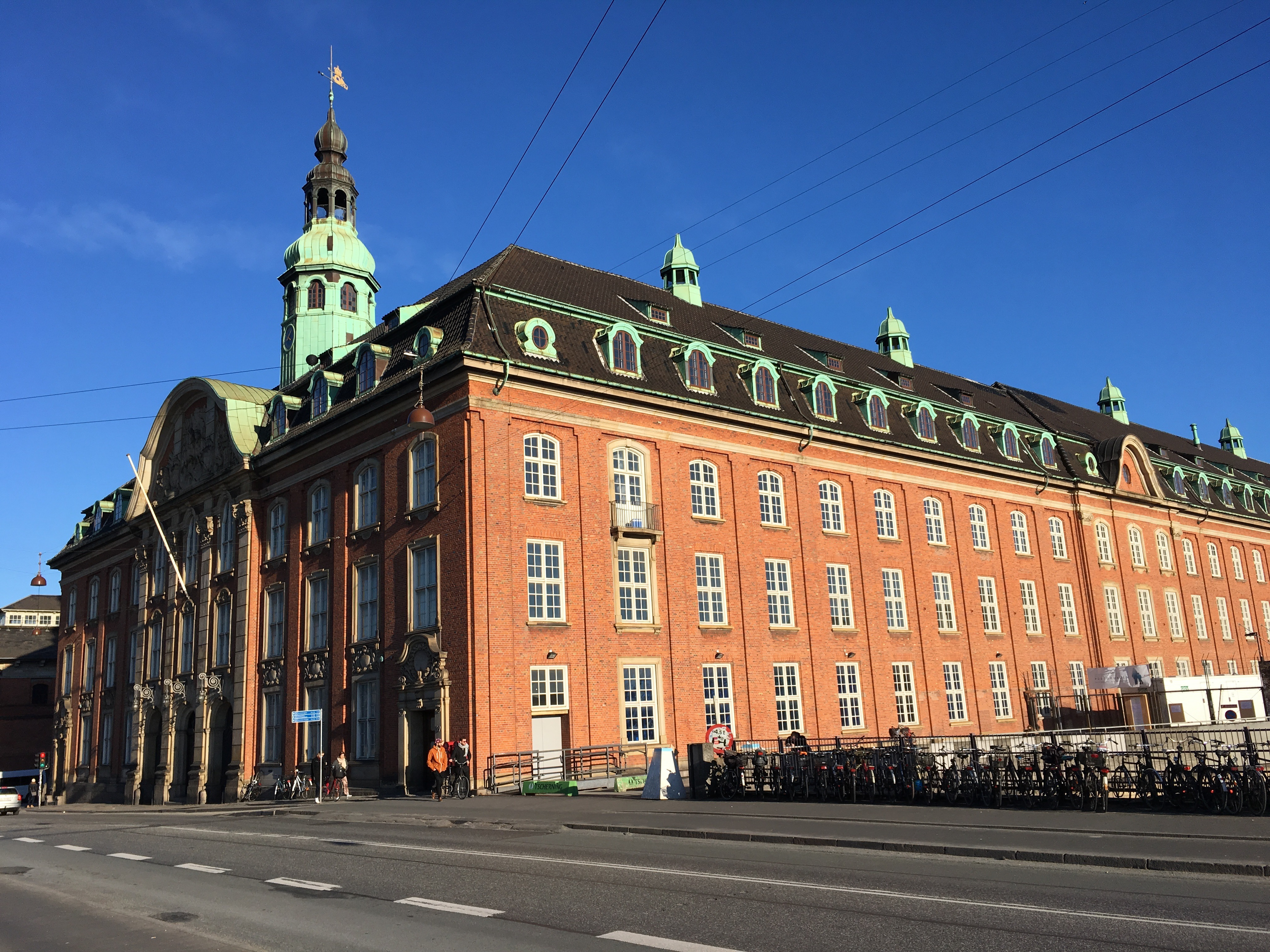
- Main facade toward Tietgensgade
- Interactive map of the Copenhagen Central Post Building area

General information
- Architectural style: Baroque Revival
- Location: Vesterbro, Copenhagen, Denmark
- Construction started: 1909
- Completed: 1912
- Cost: DKK 2.5 mio.
- Client: Danish Post and Telegraph Company

Design and construction
- Architect: Heinrich Wenck

Copenhagen Central Post Building (Danish: Centralpostbygningen), located on Tietgensgade, just behind the Central Station, in the Vesterbro district of Copenhagen, Denmark, was originally built as a new headquarters for the Danish Post and Telegraph Company and now houses Villa Copenhagen, a 390-room hotel which opened on July 1st 2020.

The building was designed in Neo-Baroque style by Heinrich Wenck, who also designed the Central Station, and completed in 1912.

== History ==
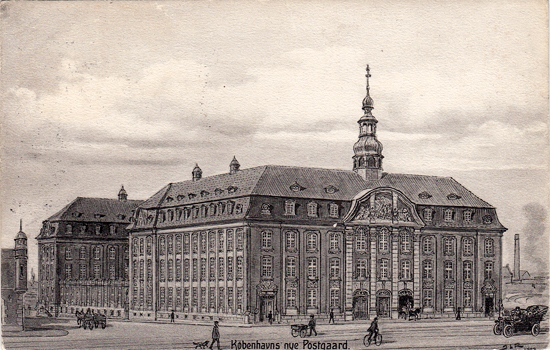
The Central Mail Building, postcard by Janus Laurentius Ridter

The Danish Mail Services traces its history back to 1624 and it was based in Mail Building in Købmagergade from 1779. When those premises became too small, in about 1900, it was decided to build a new headquarters next to the new Central Railway Station and not far from the new City Hall which was completed in 1905. Chief architect of the Danish State Railways, Heinrich Wenck, who had also designed the new central station, was charged with the commission and the new central post building was constructed from 1898 to 1912.

== Architecture ==
The Central Post Building is designed in Neo-Baroque style, one among several styles which, as a reaction to the dominance of Historicism in Danish architecture, won popularity in the beginning of the 20th century in Denmark.

== See also ==
- Architecture of Denmark
