= Godsbanen =

Coordinates: 56°09′15″N 10°11′41″E

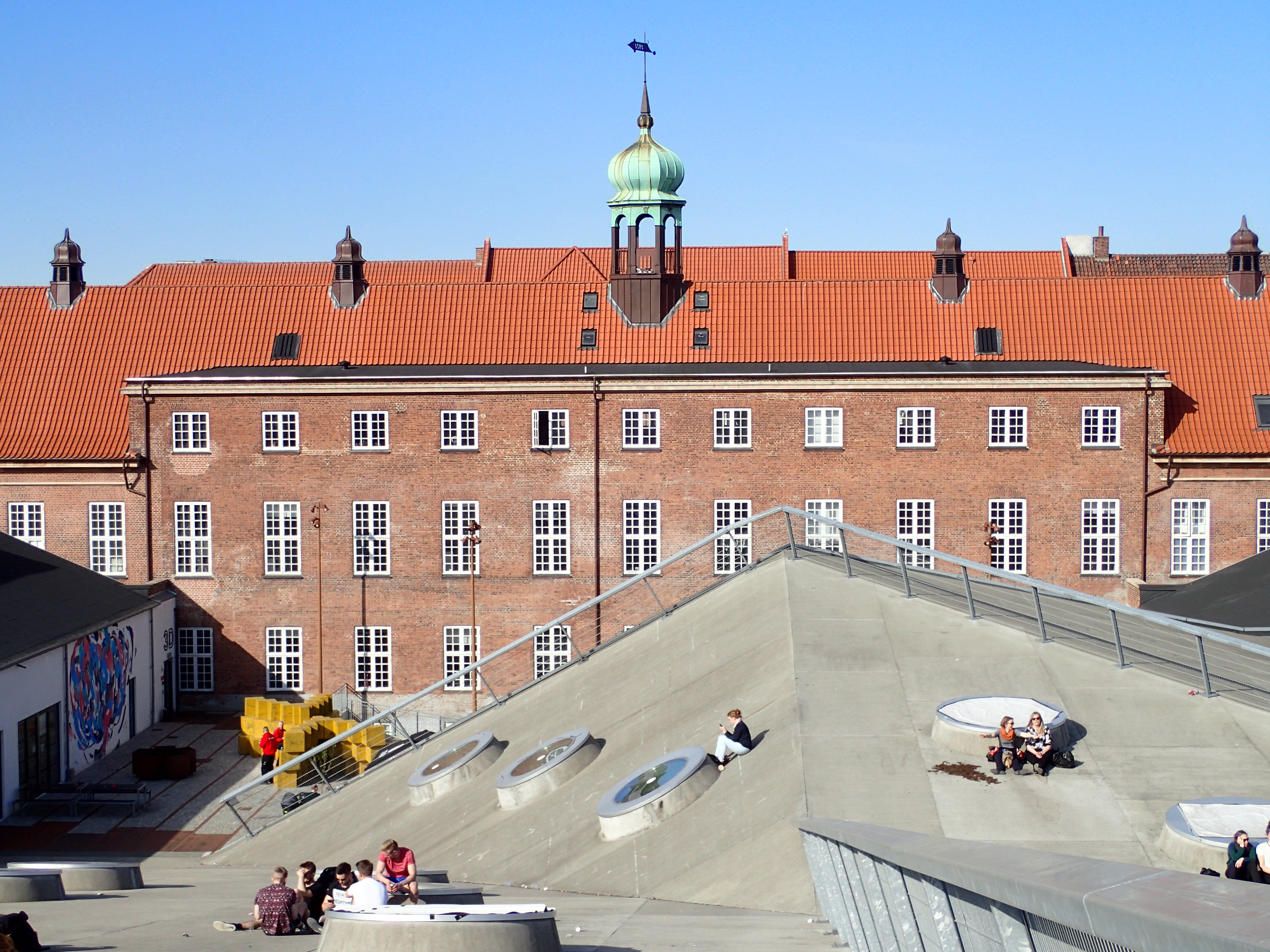
Godsbanen, including old and new structures

Godsbanen is a cultural centre in central Aarhus, Denmark since 2012. The site and most of the buildings are a former goods station, known as "Aarhus Godsbanegård" (Aarhus Goods Station), which was in use from 1923 to 2000. It is located at the end of a broad sidetrack to the central railway yard of Aarhus. In December 2010, Realdania announced that the area would be gradually transformed into a modern city district, through a collaborative project with Aarhus Municipality. Apart from the new cultural centre of Godsbanen, there are plans to build several buildings and institutions along the former railway yard, including a new school of architecture.

== History ==
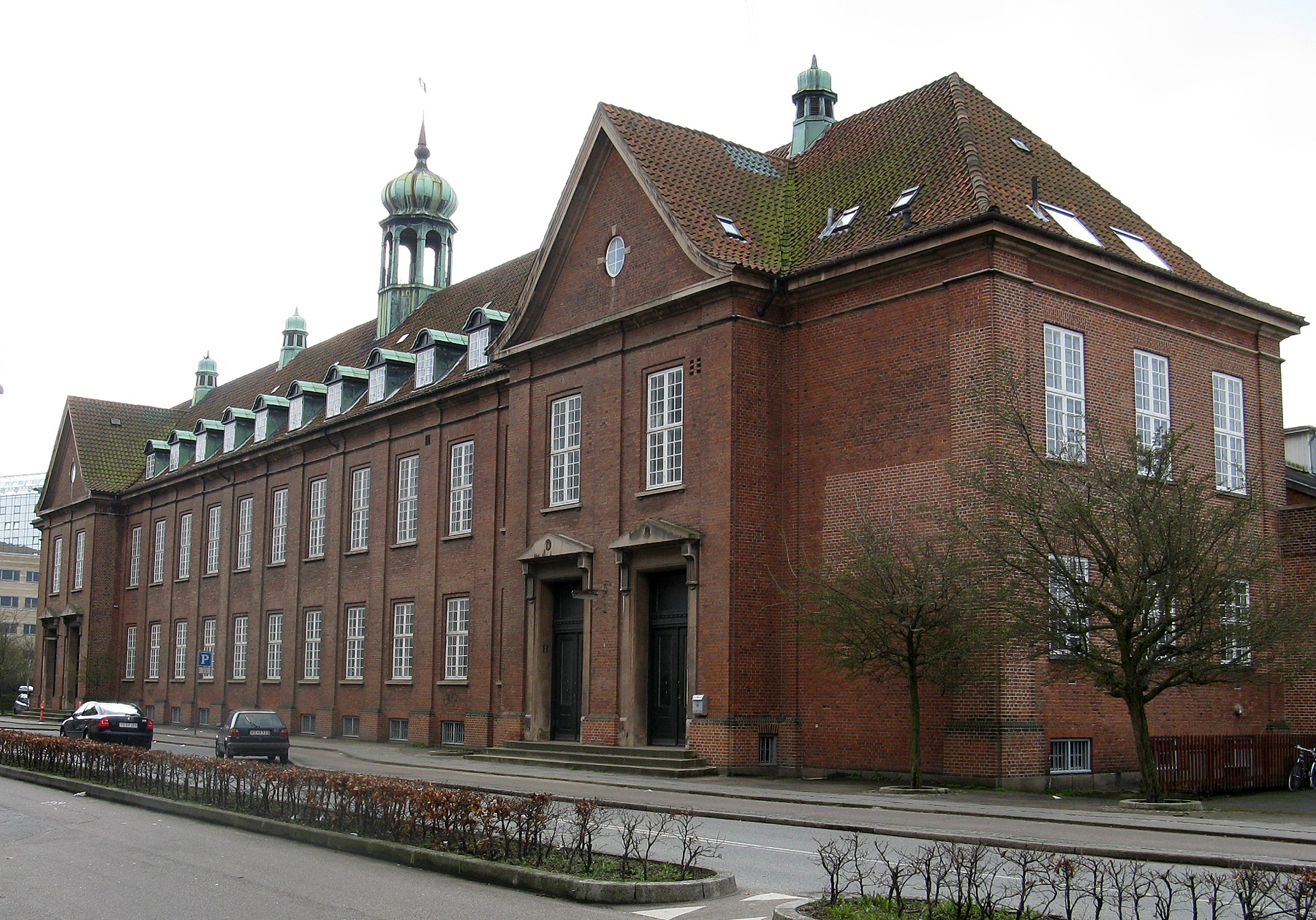
Aarhus Godsbanegård before the restoration.

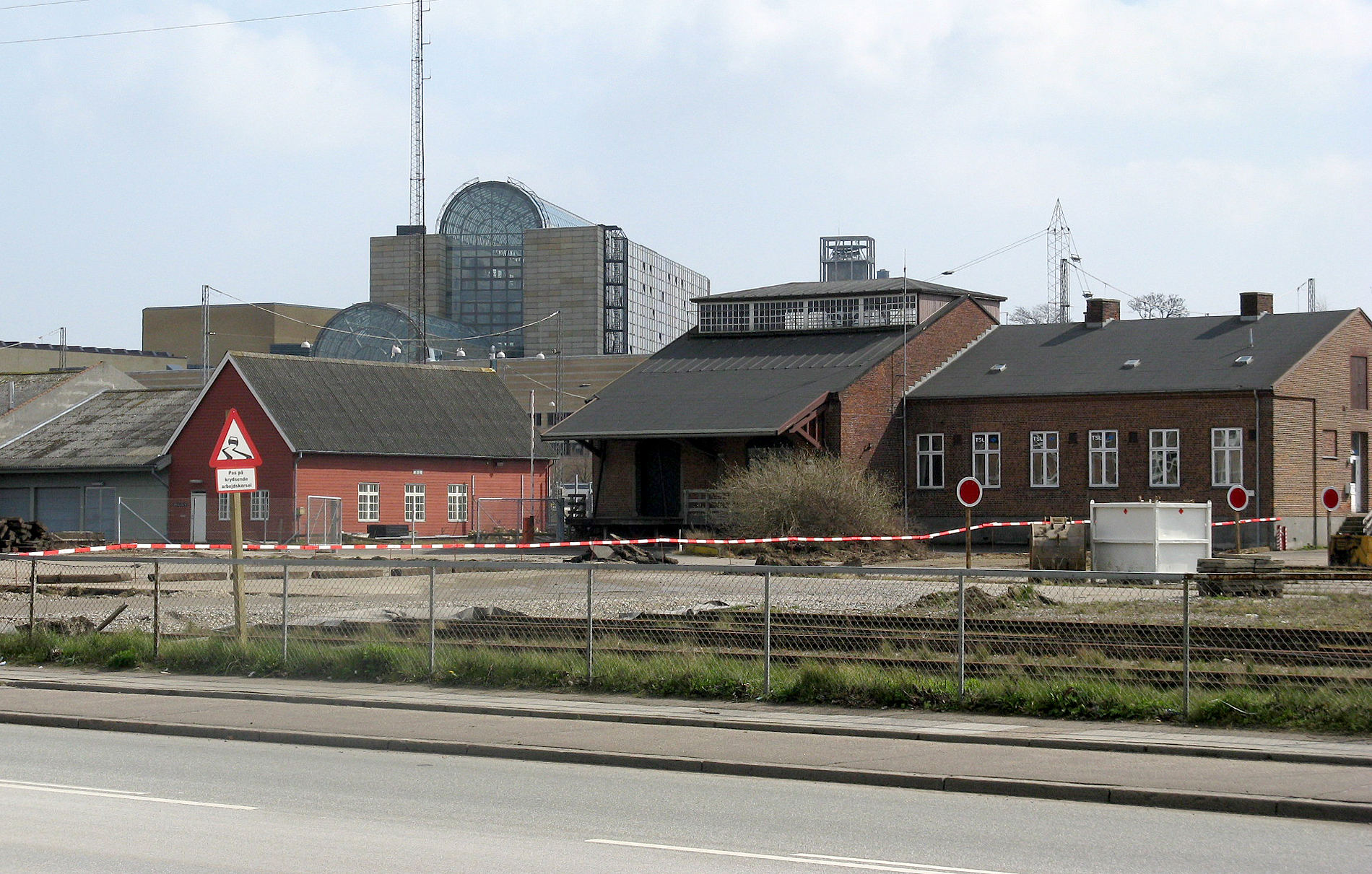
Ancillary buildings. They were demolished in 2019.

Originally, the goods station was situated at Aarhus Central Station, on the site now occupied by the Aarhus Bus Station.

In the 1890s, it was proposed to move the goods yard to Mølleengen. The plans for the move became part of the city planning in 1896 and 1898, but a full 27 years went by before they were executed. As the project was very costly, it led to extended discussions in both the city council and the national parliament, the latter being reluctant to provide funding for the project.

Only after a law was passed in 1917, covering relocation of the shunting yard and the goods station to Mølleengen near the Aarhus River, were the plans put into practice. In 1919, a new city plan was adopted and in 1920 work on the new goods station, known as "Aarhus Godsbanegård" (Aarhus Goods Station), in Skovgaardsgade was able to start. Owing to difficult soil conditions, extensive piling work had to be carried out, including 1,150,000 m3 of landfill which was moved by hand. In addition, a portion of the river was moved further north, and 3,000 fir trunks were pounded in to a depth of 20 meters as foundations for the facility's new buildings. The engineer responsible for the foundation work was track manager Thorvald Engqvist.

The goods station's main building was designed in a Neo-Baroque style by architect Heinrich Wenck and built in 1920-22 after a design phase that had begun in 1918. It was one of Wenck's last works as DSB's chief architect. The two-storey building is 15 bays long and is crowned by a hipped roof with a lantern and four ridge turrets together with a copper-clad spire topped by a Baroque onion dome. The facade is divided into lesenes. It is built of red brick and roofed with red tiles. The ventilation hoods and the flashing around the dormers are also in copper.

Perpendicular to the main building are two warehouses, originally on either side of a yard where the tracks came to a blind end. This was where the loading and unloading of the incoming and outgoing freight trains took place. In 1972 and 1984, the yard between the warehouses was transformed into a building connecting the warehouses. In 1925, the shunting yard was inaugurated together with the goods station.

Most buildings in the area have high preservation status in the Aarhus municipal atlas.

== Cultural centre ==
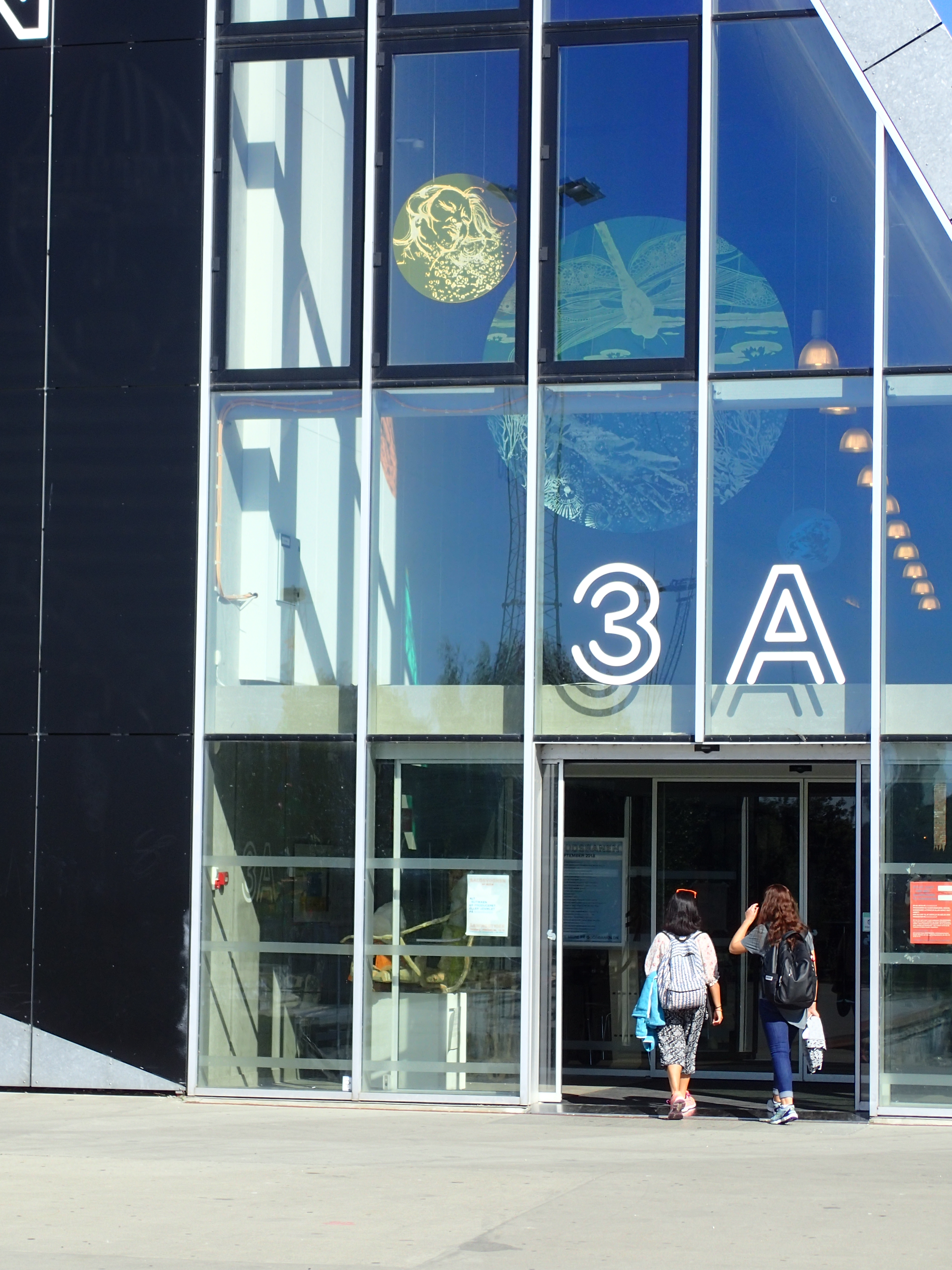
Main entrances to the cultural centre of Godsbanen

Beginning in 2009, the former goods station was renovated, the two warehouses was rebuilt and refurnished, and a new building was constructed in between. The new and old buildings now house the cultural centre of Godsbanen, opening on 30 March 2012, and organize a host of cultural arrangements and facilitates everyday cultural engagement for the citizens of Aarhus and surrounding suburbs. This includes theatre, dancing, music, film, artwork, printing, workshops, festivals and business networking. Since the opening of the centre, there has been a restaurant and café, at the center of the new building, but it has changed owners and concept several times. The former restaurant of Thorvalds (named after the original goods station's first manager Thorvald Engqvist) took over from Aarhus Folkekøkken (Aarhus Civic Kitchen) and is now replaced by Spiselauget. With slightly varying concepts, the restaurants has always focussed on sustainability and organic, seasonal and local produce.

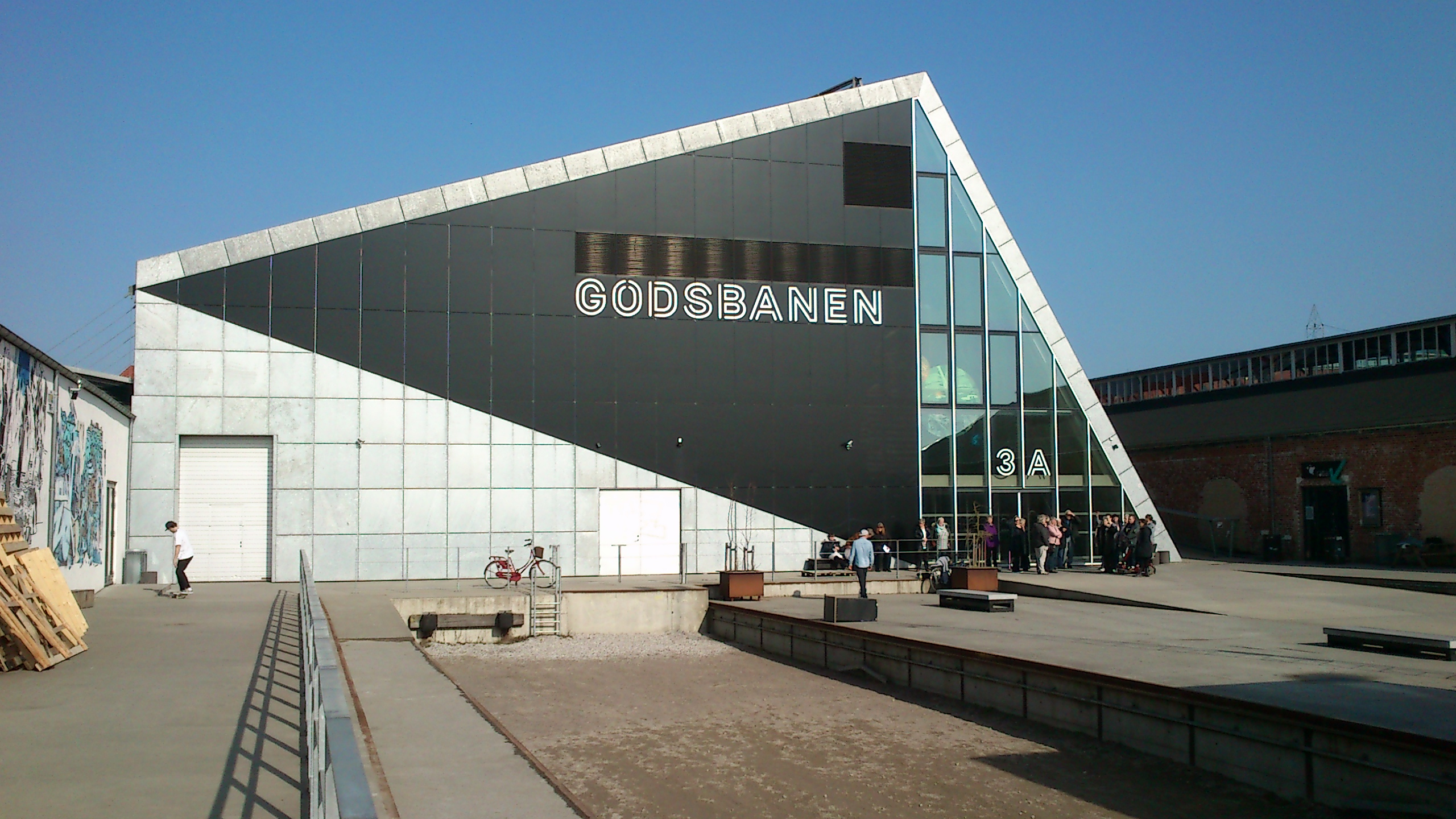
Godsbanen, the new building and main entrances

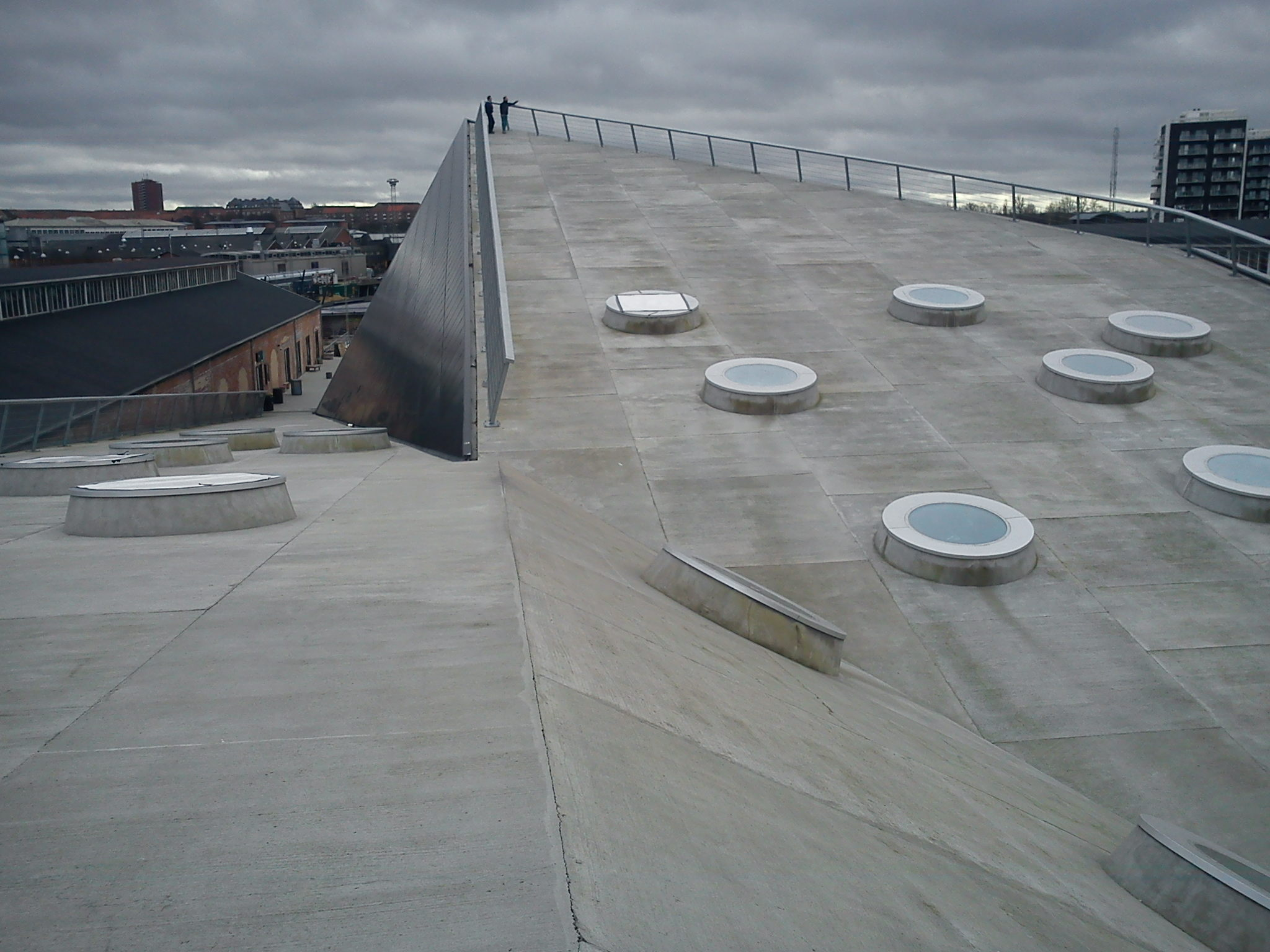
Tilted concrete roof

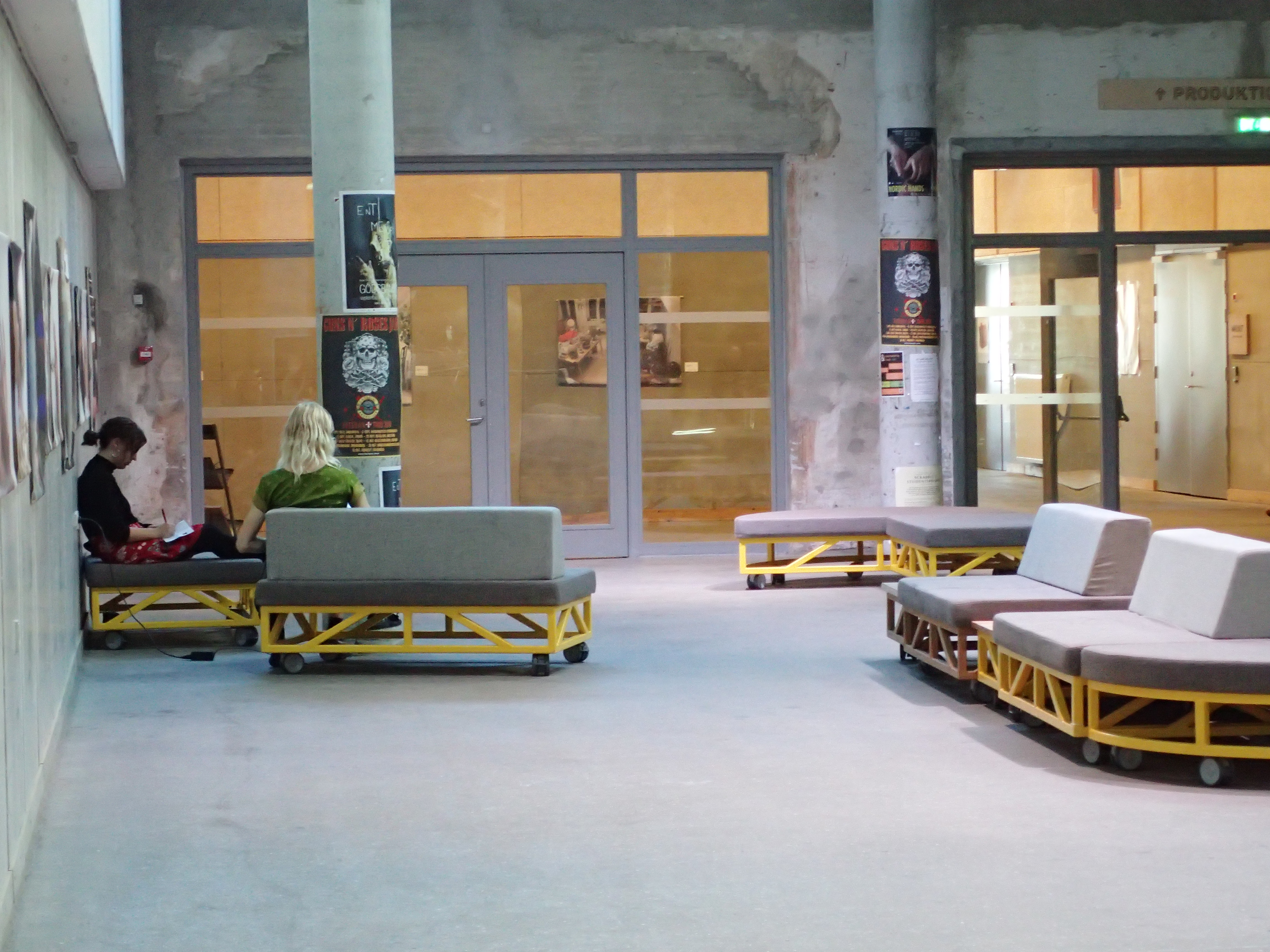
Lobby area

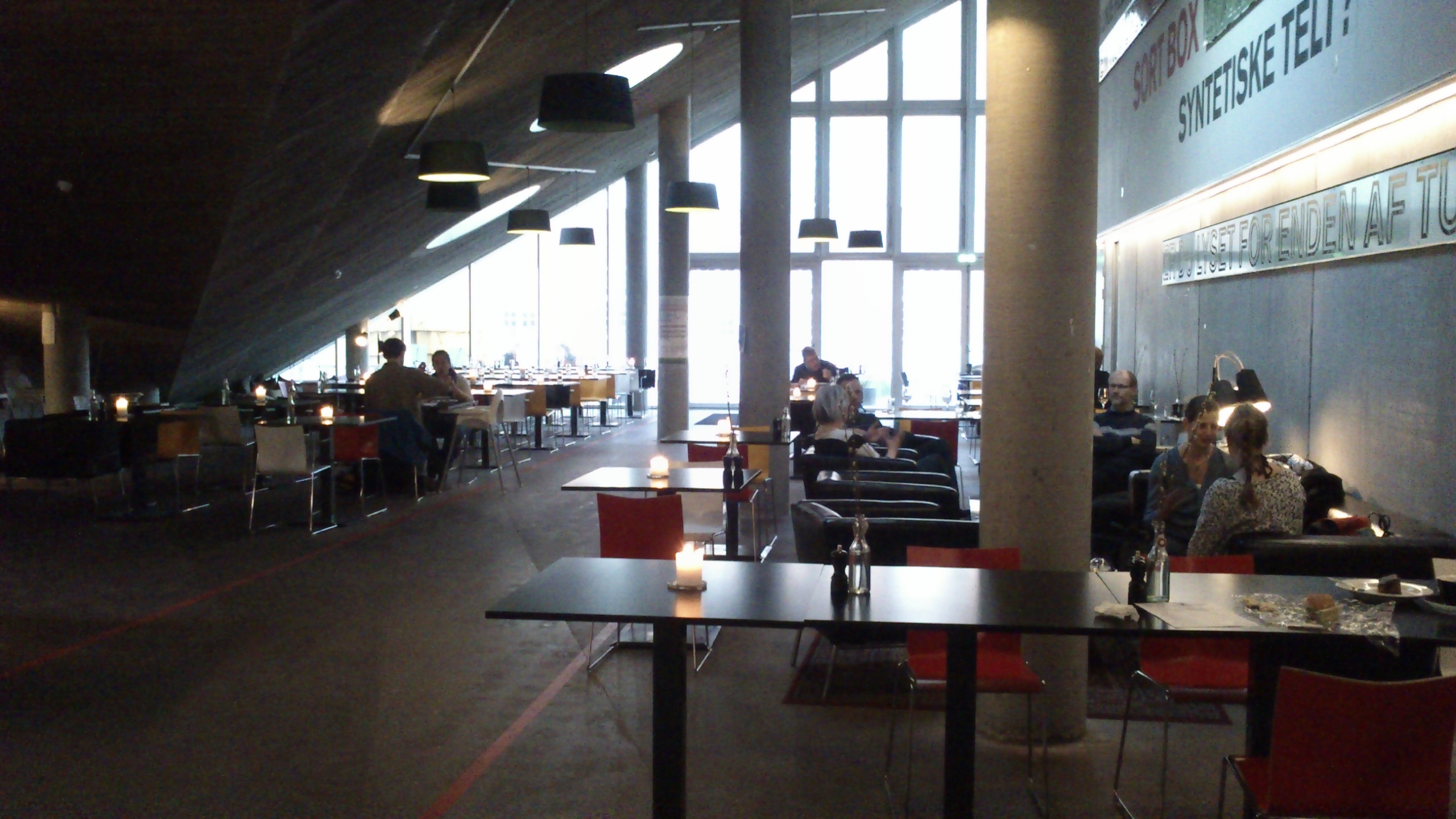
Restaurant and café area

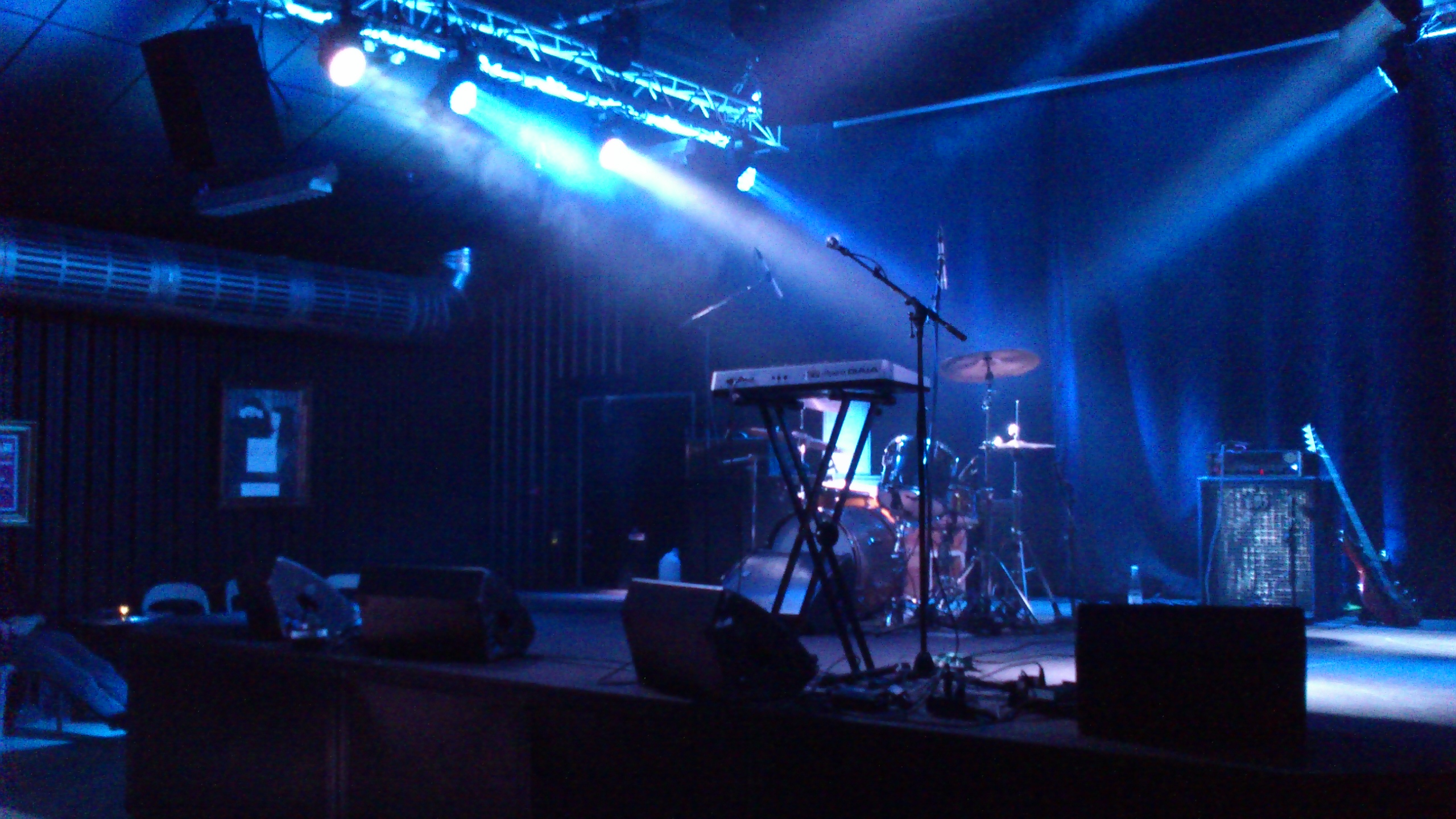
Radar, a small music venue

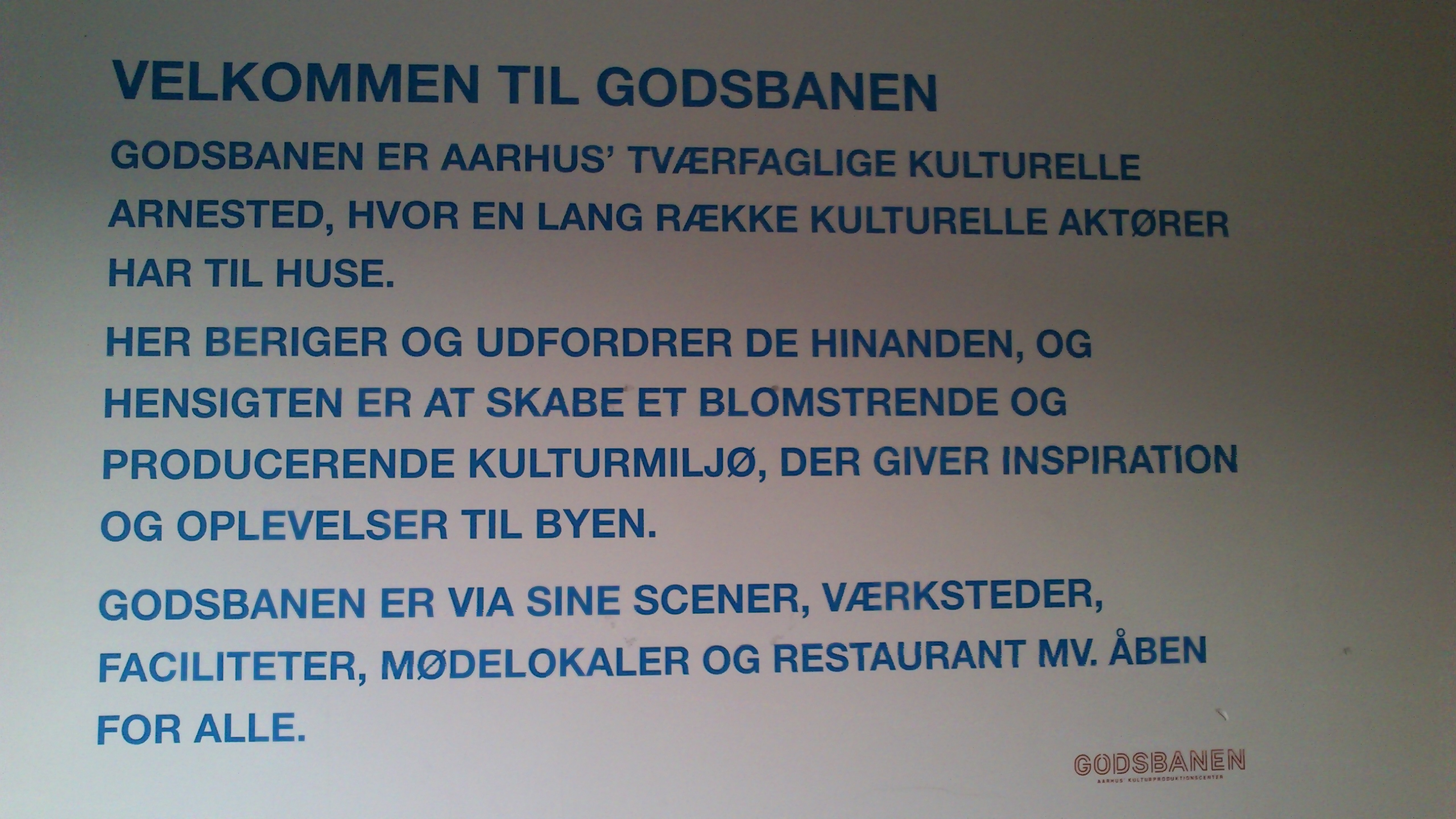
From the walls of Godsbanen. The Danish text loosely describes the concept of the cultural centre.

=== Surroundings ===
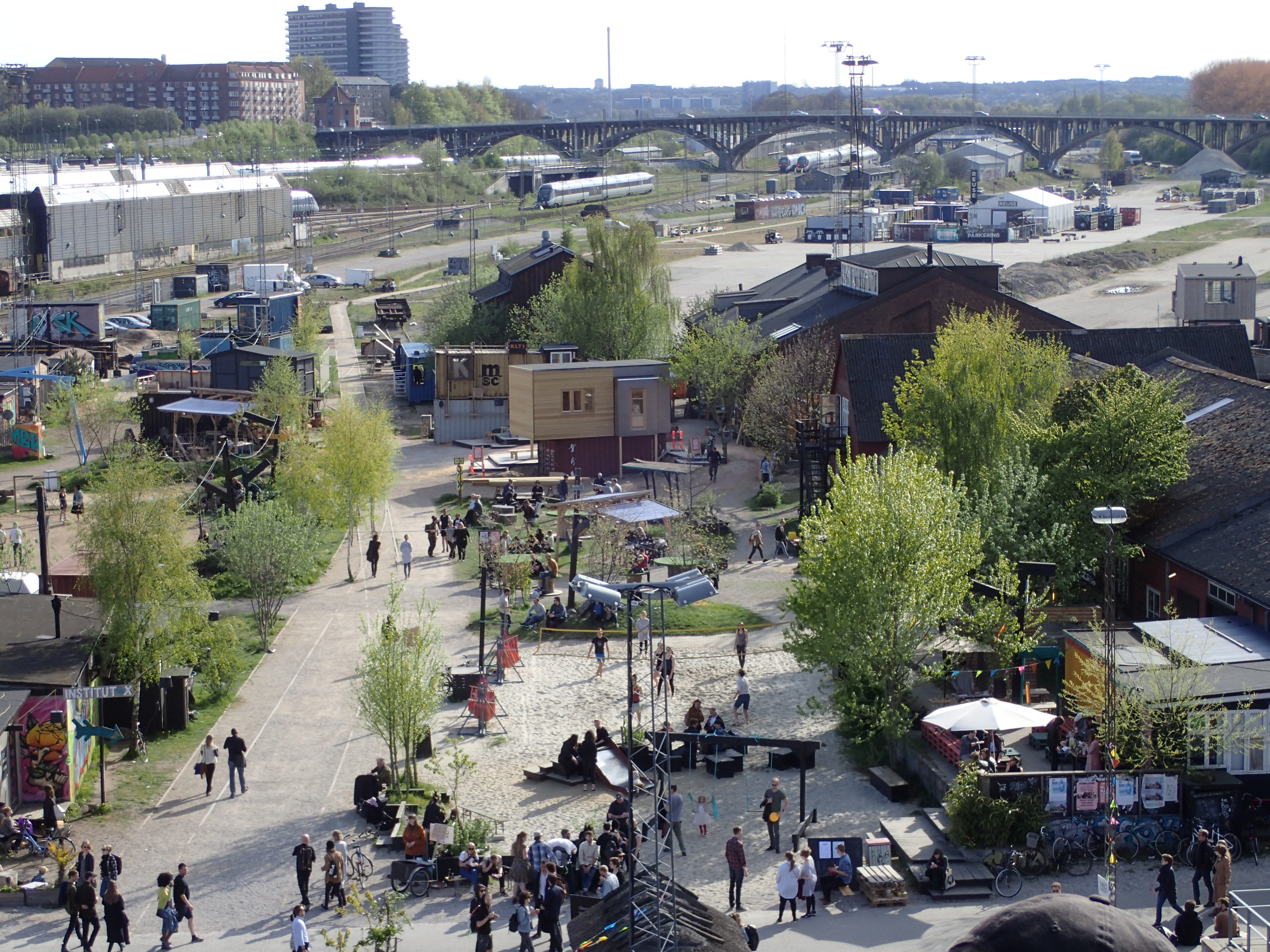
View of the surrounding areas of Godsbanen in 2017, including the village commune of Institut for (X)

The decommissioned railway lines leading up to the former freight station, has been unused for many years, but along with the construction of the Godsbanen cultural centre, independent cultural actors were allowed by the municipality to move in. This led to the do-it-yourself village of Institut for (X), a recycling station, and other time limited cultural and social projects sprouting in the area since 2009. The deal is that while no rent is paid, settlements and activities should give way for future construction projects in the area. Along with the new Godsbanen cultural centre, this whole area was unofficially dubbed Aarhus K ("K" for Kultur or Culture in Danish) as a kind of new cultural district for the city.

Institut for (X) is a self-governed cultural commune for small independent businesses and cultural projects. Here cafés, nightclubs, workshops, repair shops, skateboarding, urban farming, alternative construction and living quarters have emerged as a creative amalgam. Since 2019, when new construction in the area took off, much of Institut for (X) has been demolished, but the commune and organisation was so popular that plans for a more permanent future in the area is scheduled.

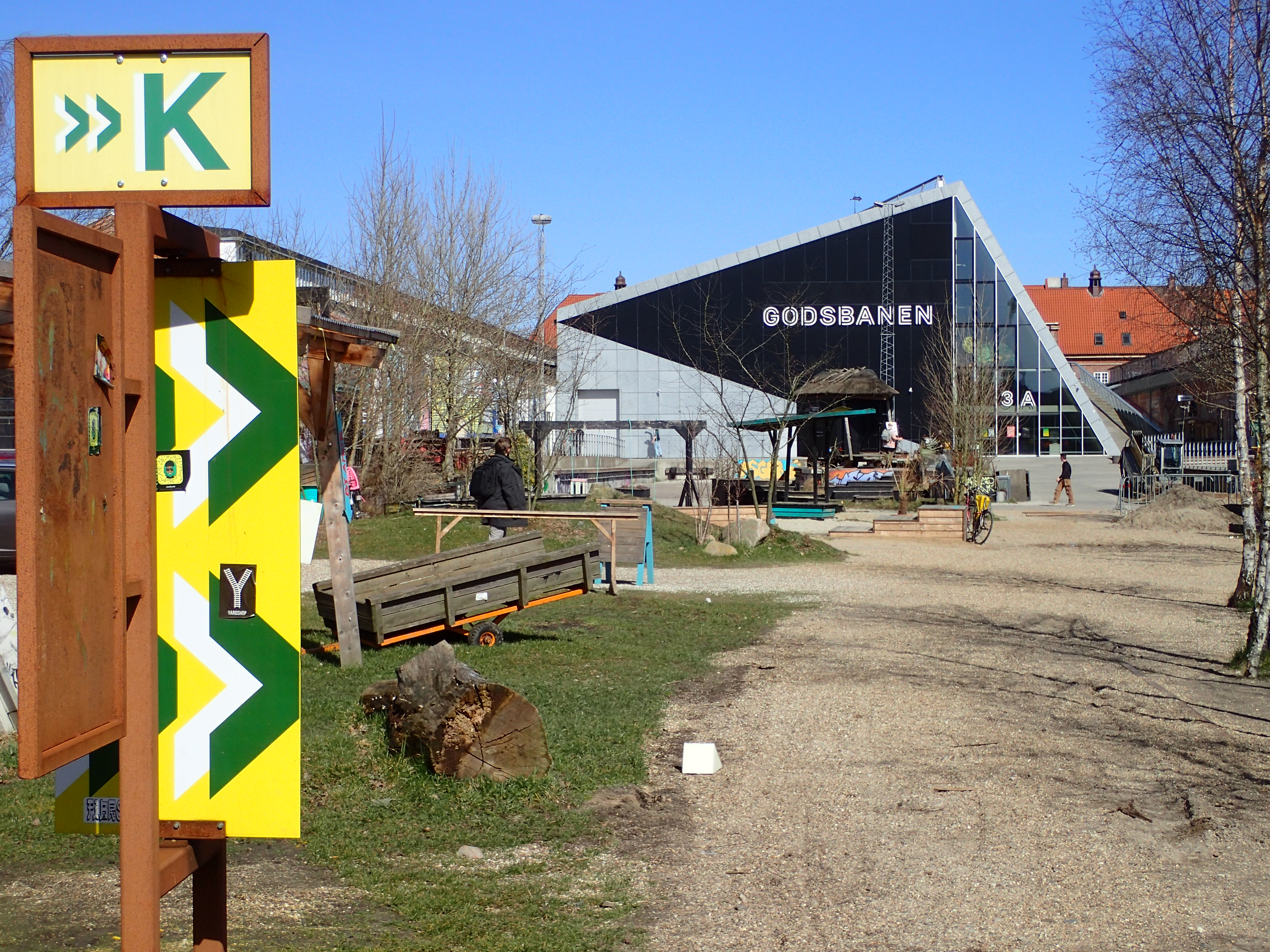
Aarhus K

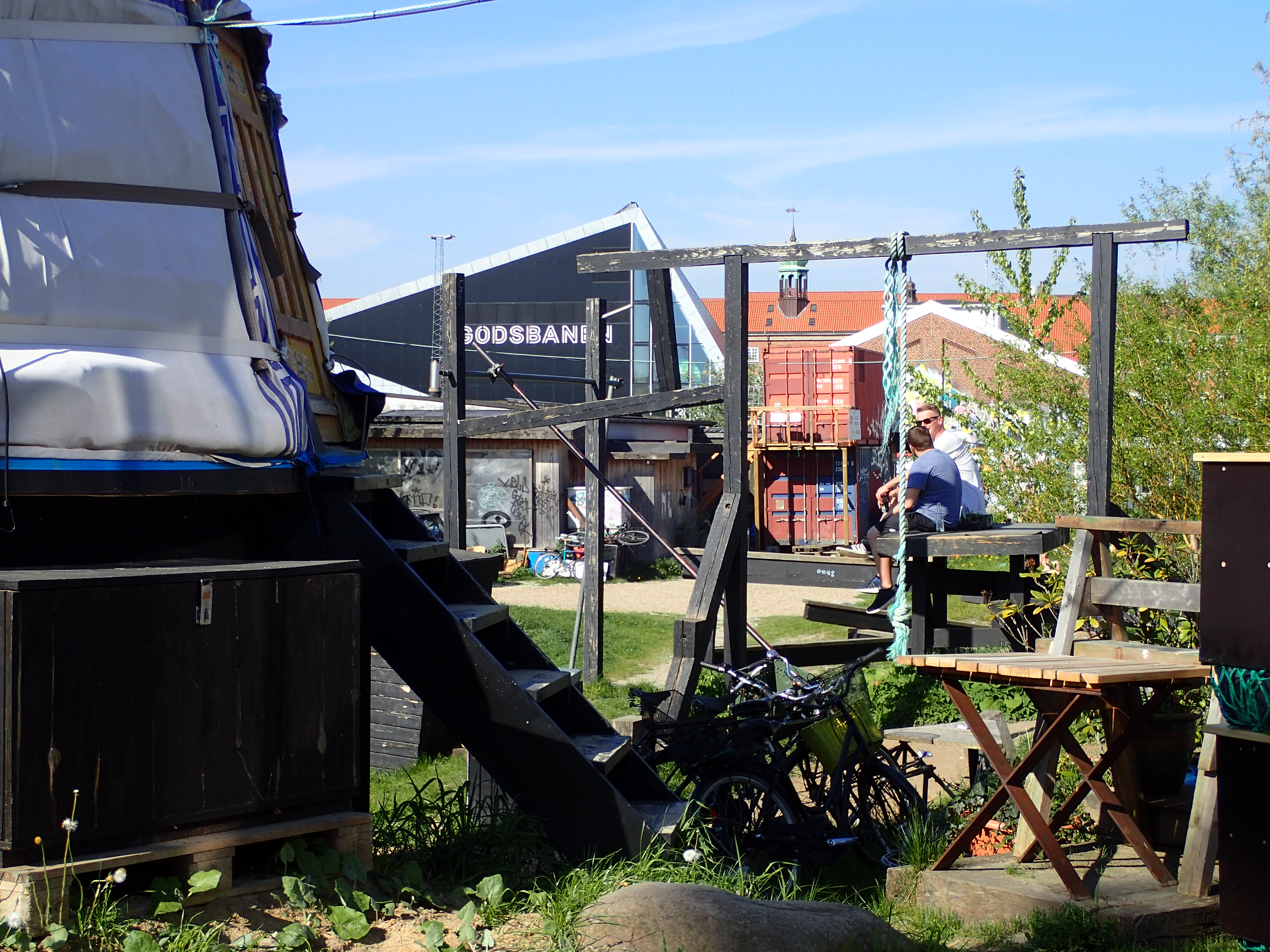
Institut for (X) village scene (2018)

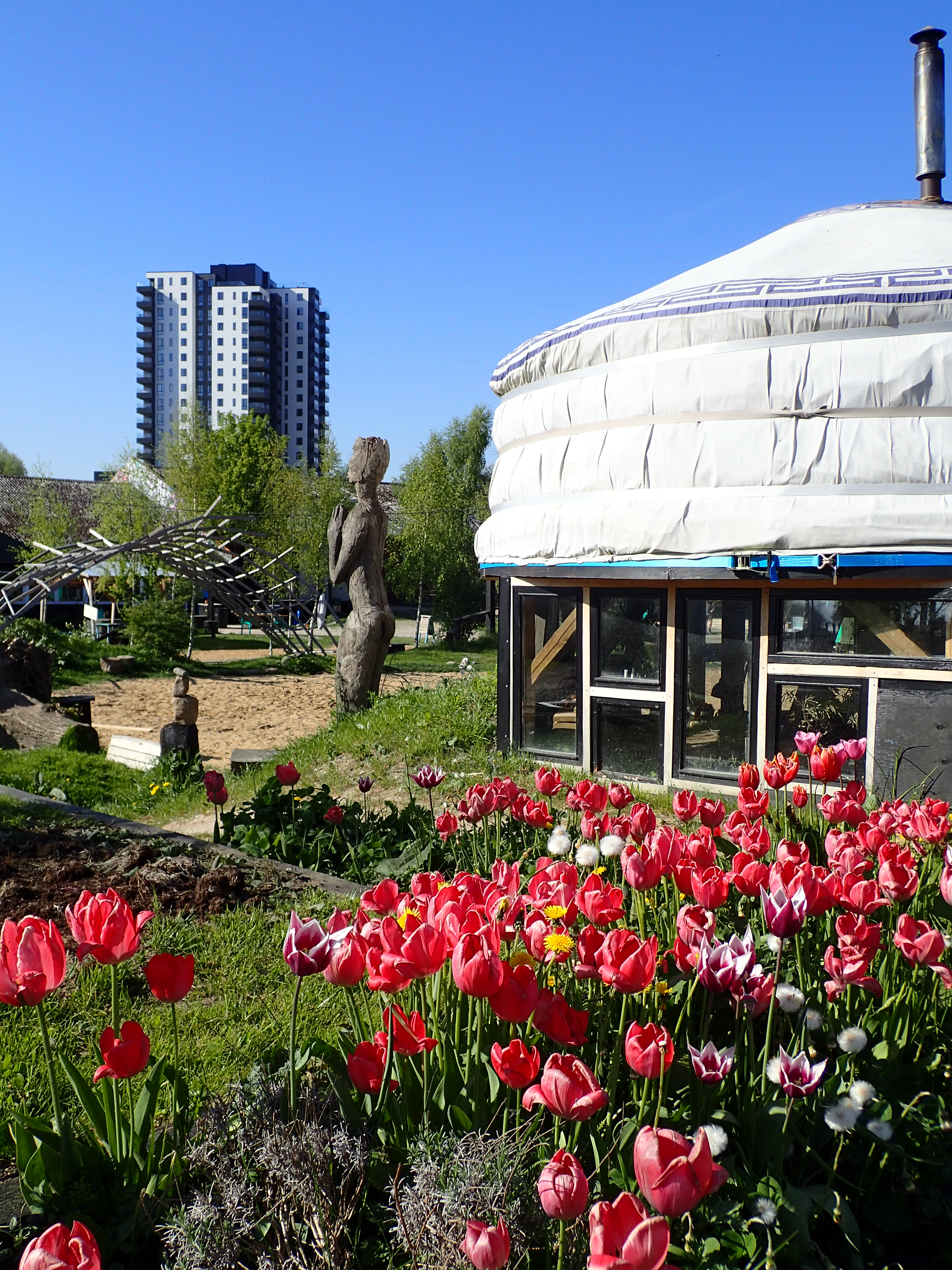

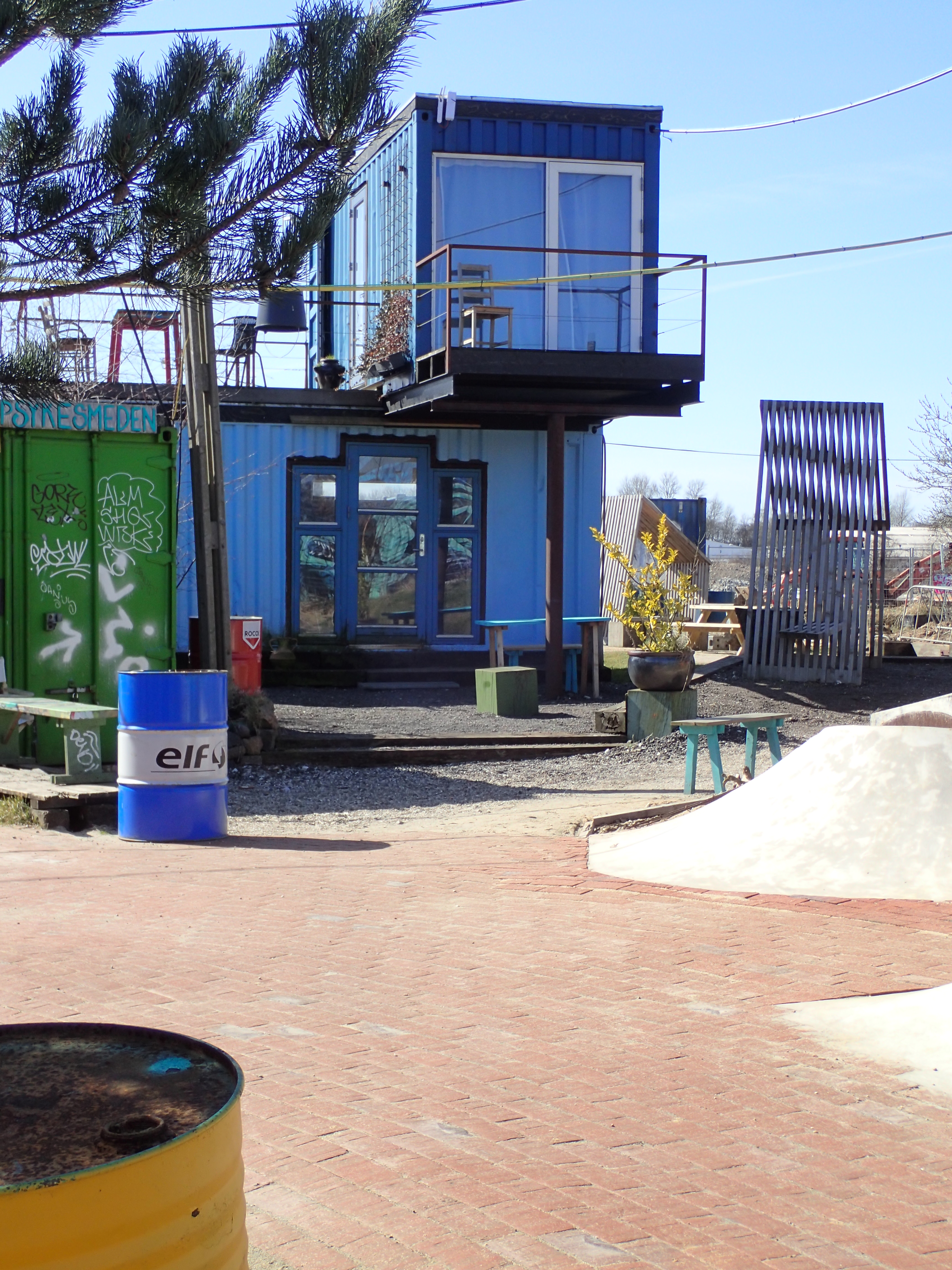

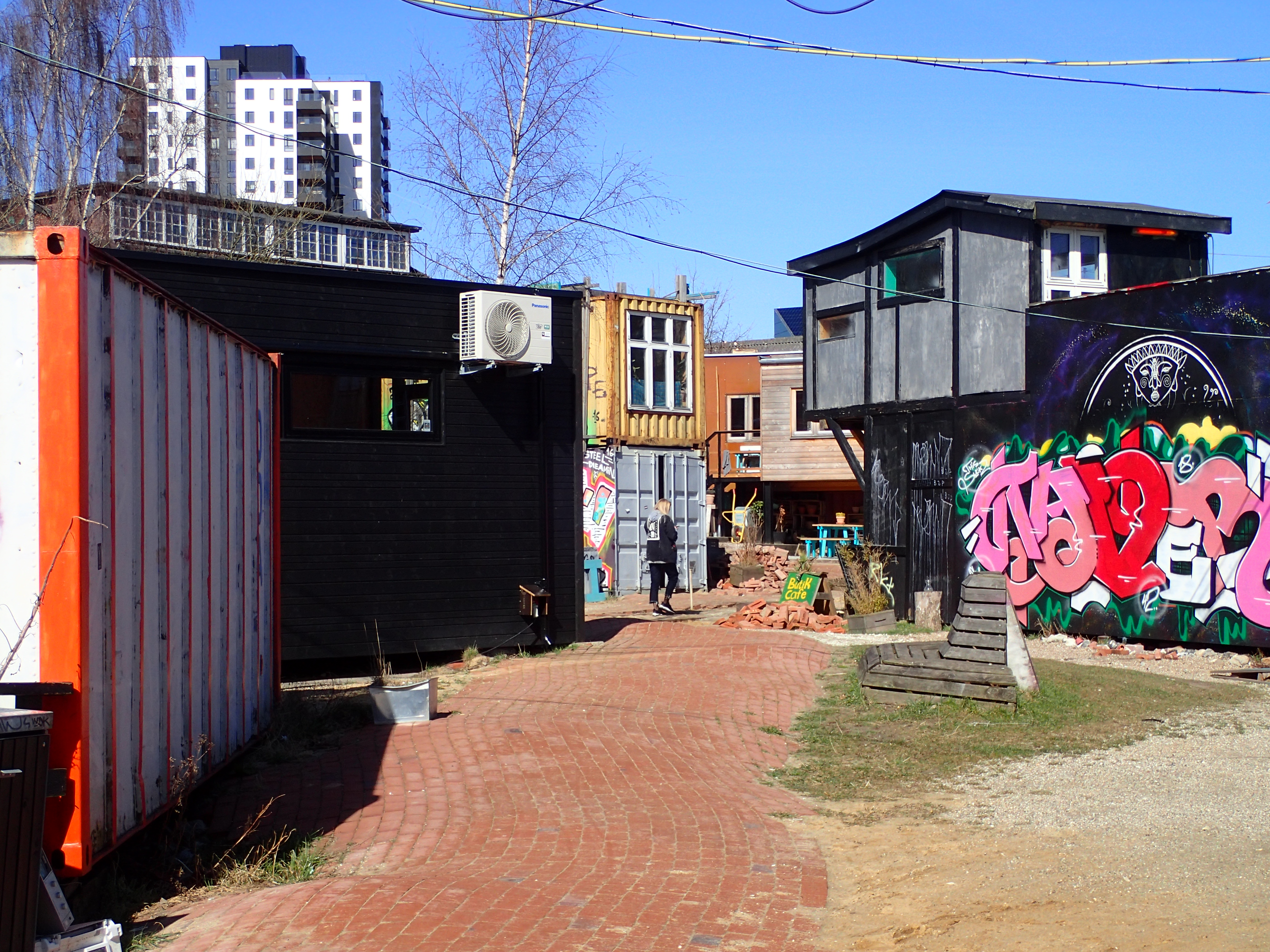

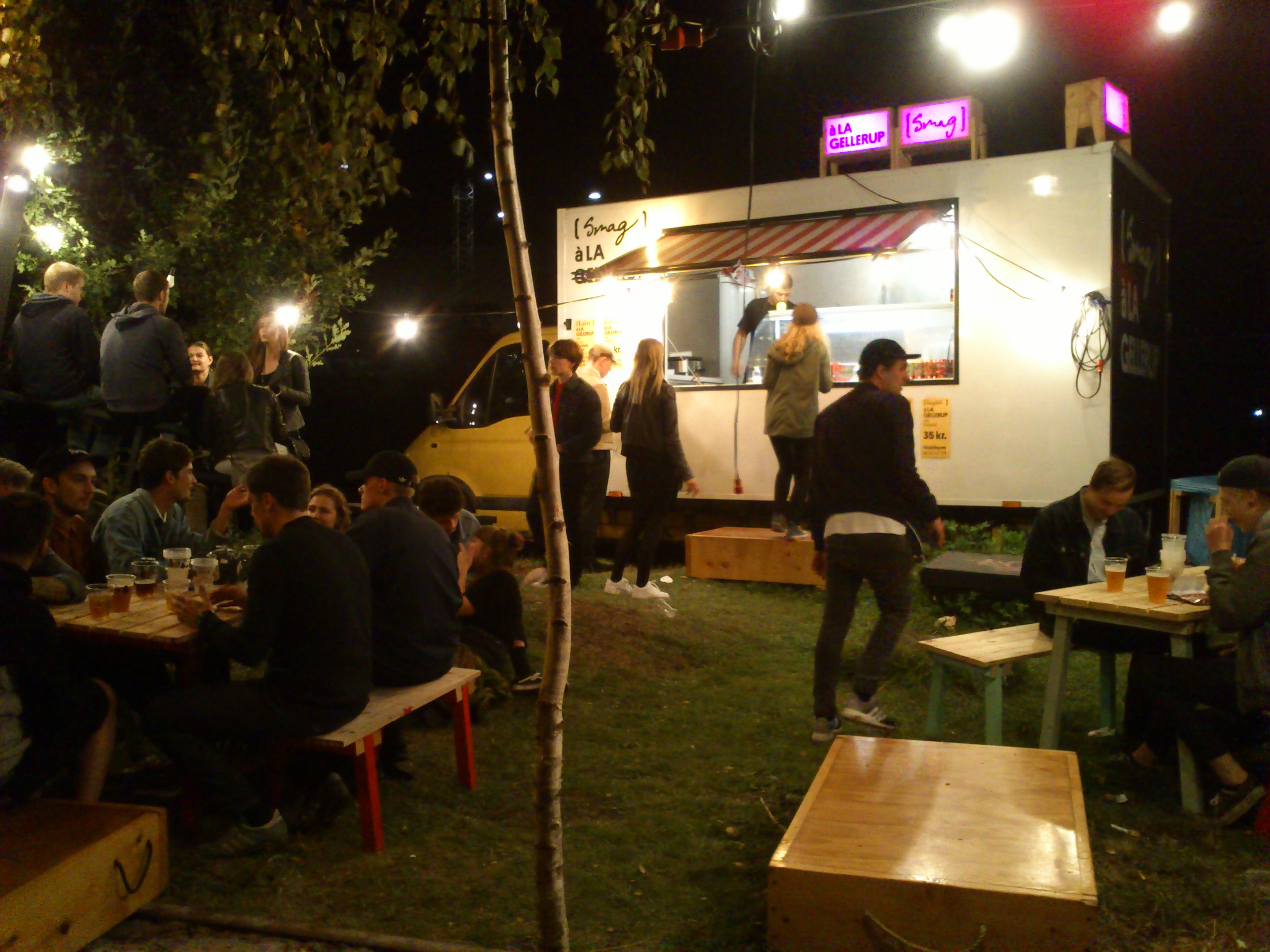
Parties and food projects

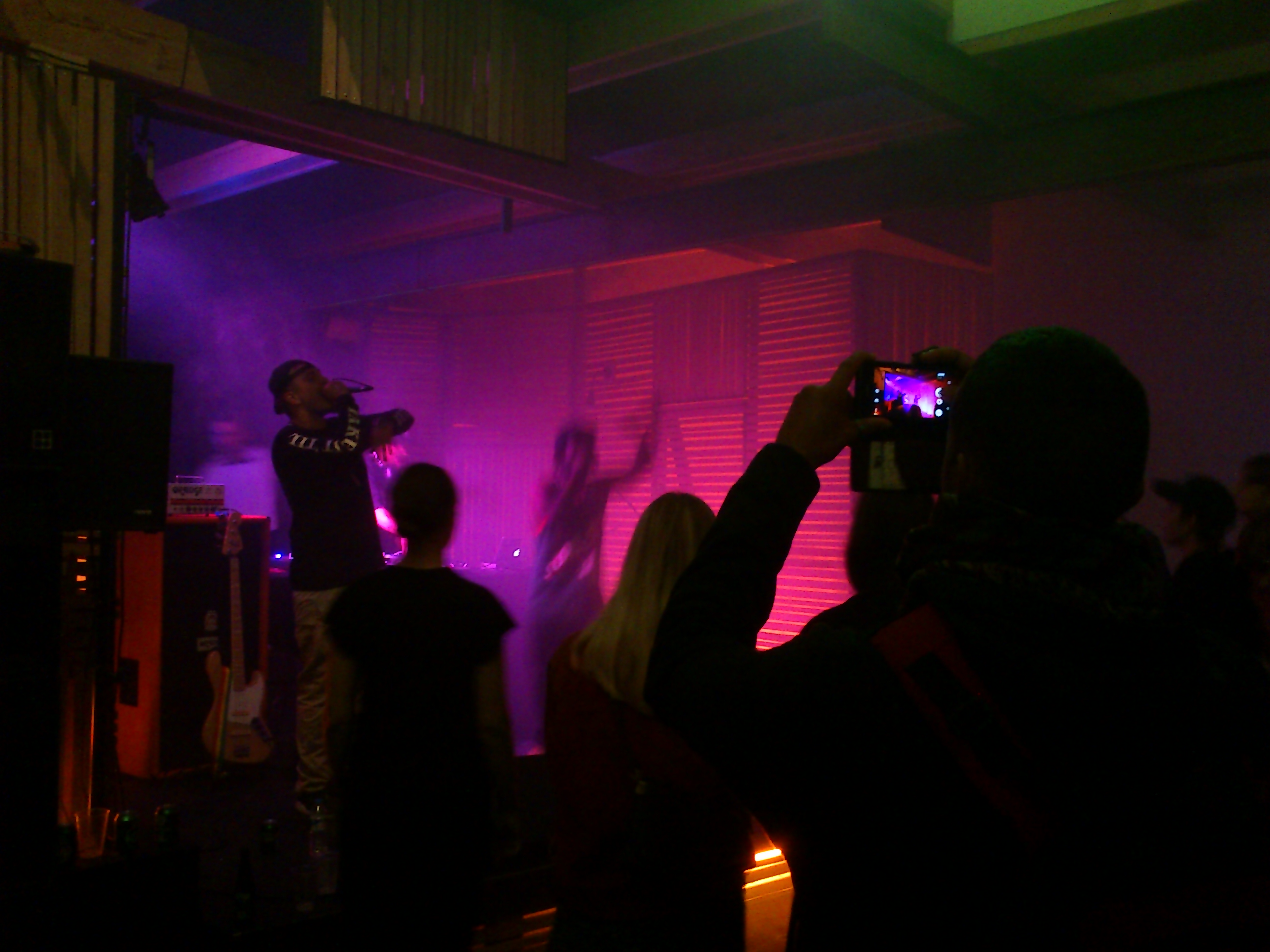
Concerts

== Future projects ==
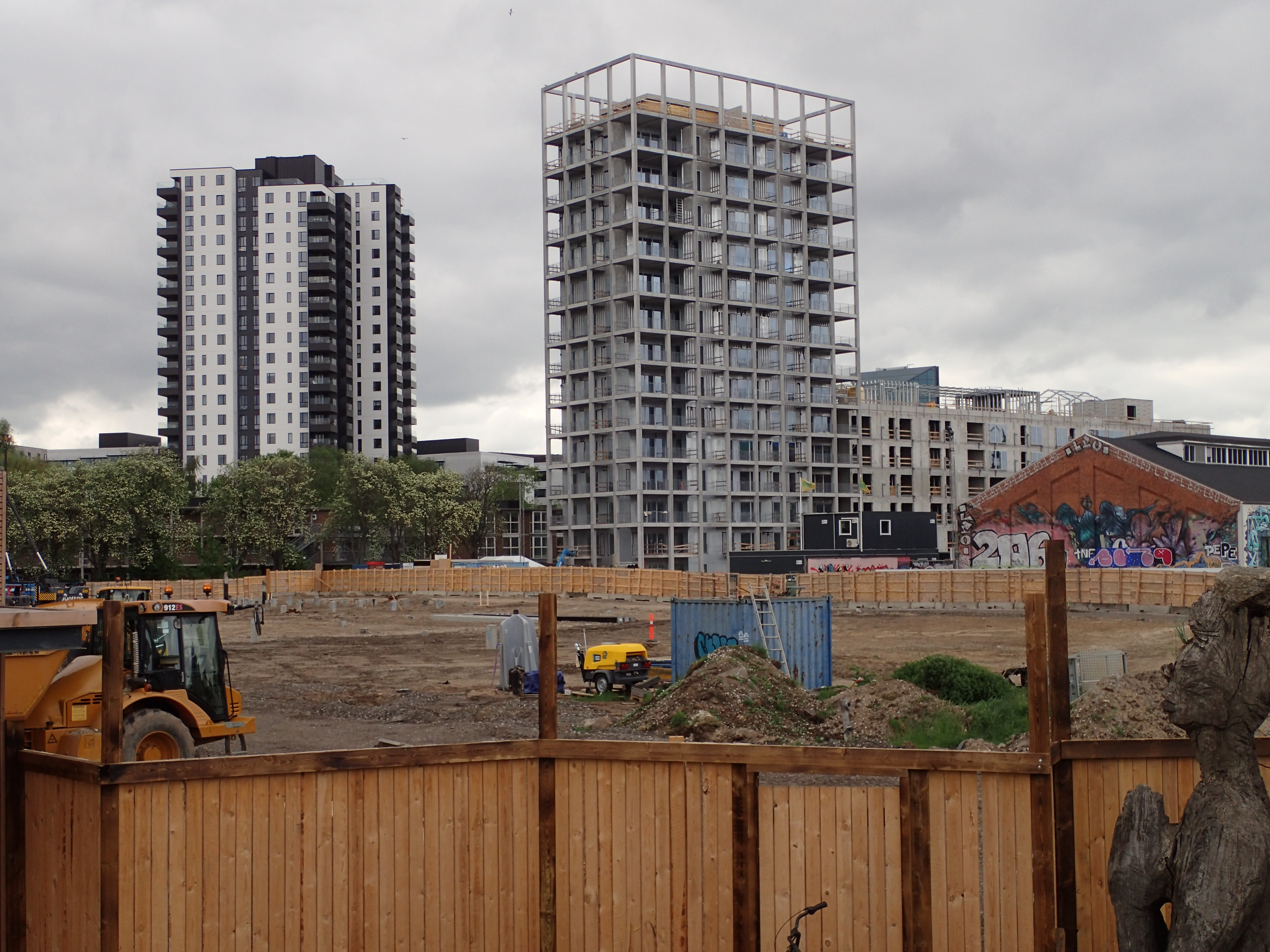
New construction at Godsbanen, as of May 2019. About half of the Institut for (X) village has been demolished and Æggepakkeriet is almost finished.

New building projects at Godsbanen includes several major education institutions, commercial functions and private, youth and social housing.

Aarhus School of Architecture's new building is the first time ever a school of architecture is going to be built in Denmark. The Danish Building & Property Agency. The international competition was launched by The Danish Building & Property Agency and Aarhus School of Architecture with the assistance of the Danish Architects’ Association and with funding from Realdania.

Æggepakkeriet (The Egg Packery), is a new residencial highrise project with a mix of small creative shops and business premises at ground level. The project is a repurposing of a former egg packery in combination with three new buildings, all designed by Sleth Architects.

Aarhus Produktionsskole (Aarhus Production School) was scheduled to start construction of a 3,000m^{2} new production school on 1 January 2017. Due to a national restructuring of all Danish productions schools into Forberedende Grunduddannelse (FGU), the construction was postponed. Pluskontoret Arkitekter is responsible for building advisory for Aarhus Production School.

Godsbanekollegiet is a youth housing project by Kollegiekontoret in cooperation with Arbejdernes Andelsboligforening (AAB). For the part of Kollegiekontoret the project consists of an international student youth housing with 120-150 inhabitants. A competition has been completed for the project in 2016 with the support of the Ministry of Housing. Aarhus City Council handles the local plan for the project in autumn 2018 and construction is planned in the period 2019–21.

== Sources ==
- Søren Bitsch Christensen (ed.): Århus Godsbanegård - historie og kulturarvsanbefalinger. January 2009, Dansk Center for Byhistorie 2009. (in Danish)
