= Roskilde Gasworks =

Building in Roskilde, Denmark

Coordinates: 55.6484°N 12.0785°E

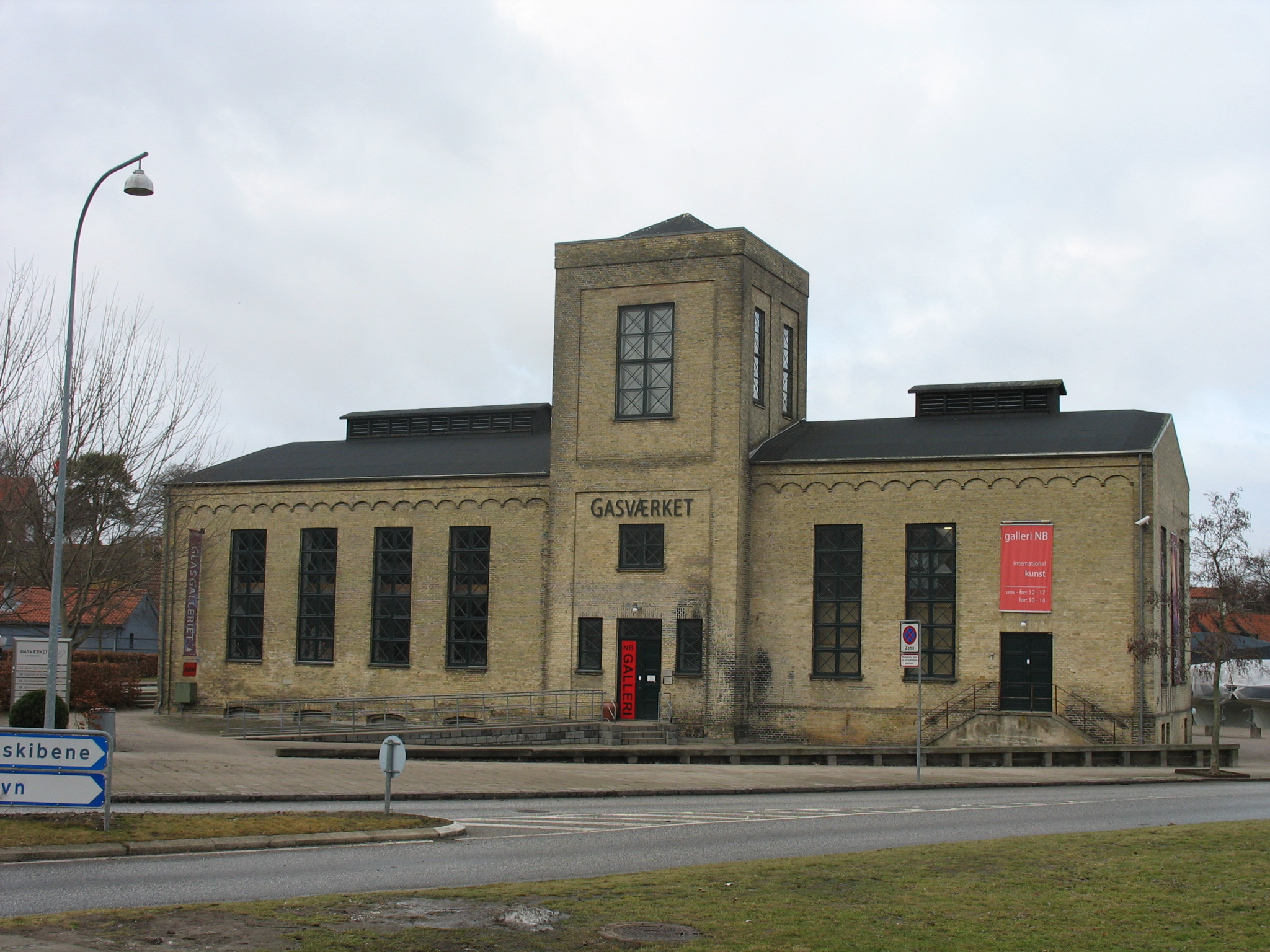
Roskilde Gasworks

Roskilde Gasworks (Danish: Roskilde Gasværk) is a former gasworks in Roskilde, Denmark. The buildings are listed and after a thorough restoration in 1995, they are now housing an arts center with an art gallery, studios, and workshops for local artists.

== History ==
Denmark saw its first gasworks with the inauguration of the Western Gasworks in Copenhagen in 1857. Roskilde Gasworks opened in 1863 and the building was later expanded in 1899 and 1930. It was decommissioned in 1979.

== Architecture ==
Originally built in the Historicist style, the facade now mainly exemplifies Functionalism, although the later expansions have been carried out with respect for the building's original architecture. The main building, as well as an iron frame of a gasholder constructed in 1930, was listed in 1994. The facility is representative of the more than 100-year-long history of urban gasworks in Denmark.

The buildings were restored in 1995 and adapted for its new use as an arts centre. It was necessary to remove all interior parts, furnishings and fittings due to severe pollution caused by its former use.

== Arts centre ==
The workshops and studios of the arts centre are primarily focussing on glass, ceramics, textiles and painting, but Roskilde Gasværk has a broad artistic scope and house music and theatrical events and operates an art gallery (Gallery LABR).

== See also ==
- Roskilde Forsyning
