= Kedelhallen =

Cultural center in Frederiksberg, Denmark

Coordinates: 55.6840°N 12.5215°E

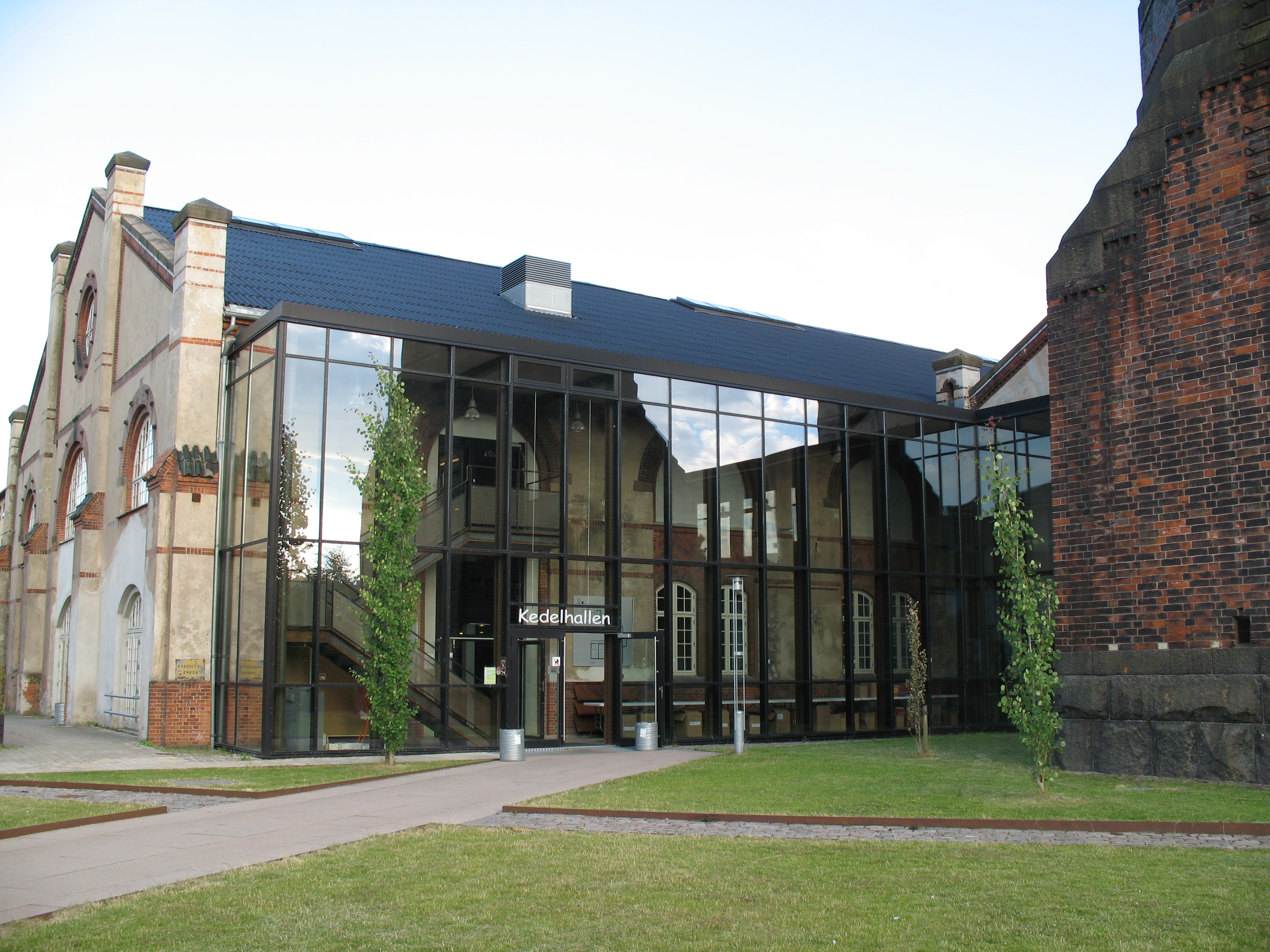
Kedelhallen

Kedelhallen (lit. "The Boilerhouse") is a cultural and sports venue in the Frederiksberg district of Copenhagen, Denmark. The buildings were previously part of Frederiksberg Incineration Plant but were adapted for their current use in 2001.

== Buildings ==
The building complex contains two venues. The larger one is located in the former electricity plant, the smaller one in the boilerhouse.

== Use ==
Kedelhallen is owned by Frederiksberg Municipality and together with a number of other similar venues operated by Frederiksberg Idrætsunion . The complex contains two venues.
