= Rolighedsvej =

Street in the Frederiksberg district of Copenhagen, Denmark

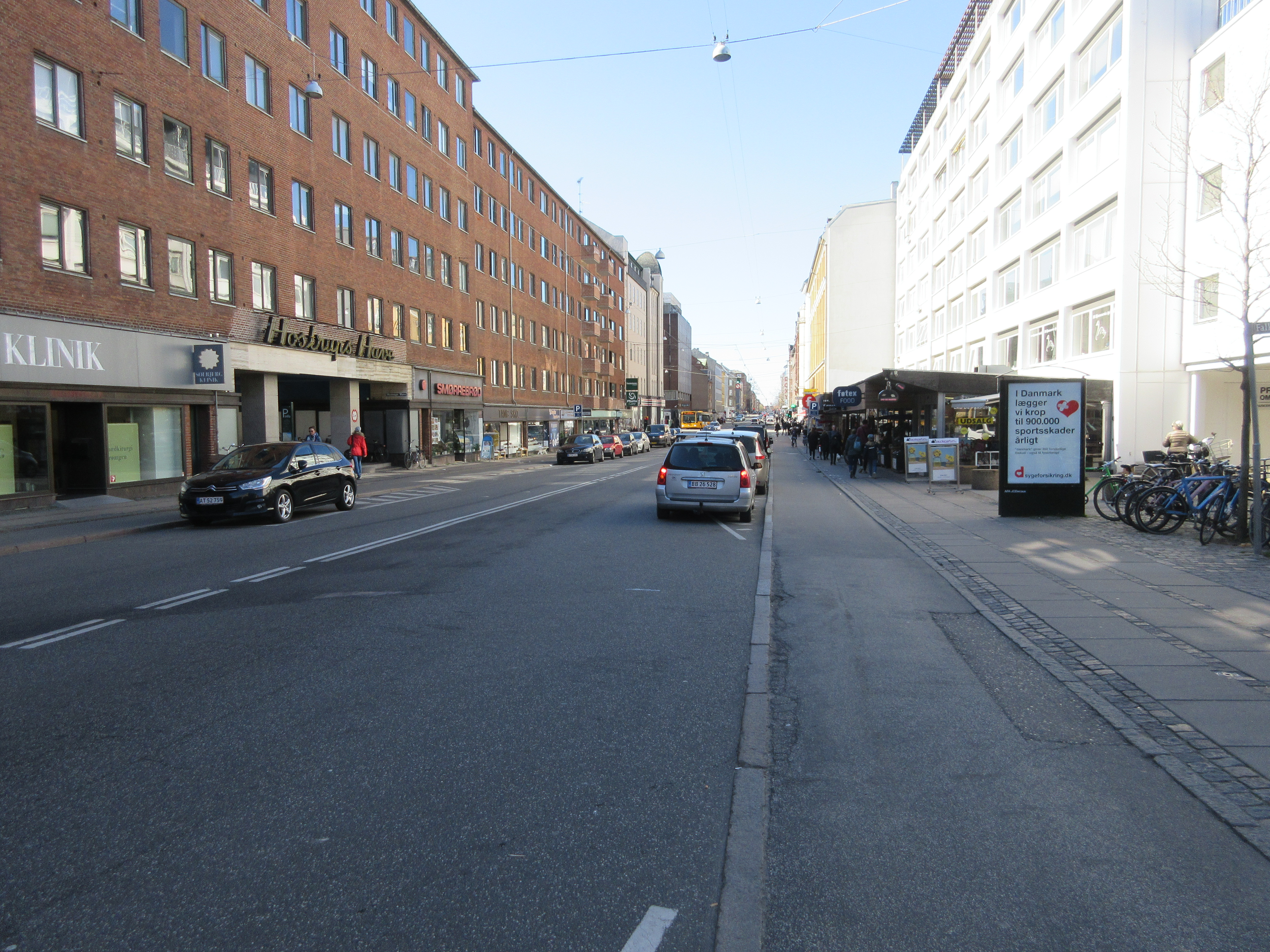
- Length: 493 m (1,617 ft)
- Location: Frederiksberg, Copenhagen, Denmark
- Postal code: 1958
- Nearest metro station: Forum
- Coordinates: 55°41′04.5″N 12°32′30.7″E

Rolighedsvej is a street in the Frederiksberg district of Copenhagen, Denmark. It runs from Falkoner Allé in the northwest to Bülowsvej in the southeast, linking Godthåbsvej with Rosenørns Allé. The street is dominated by the University of Copenhagen's Frederiksberg Campus. It takes its name after Rolighed, a Rococo-style country house from 1770 which is now owned by the university.

== History ==
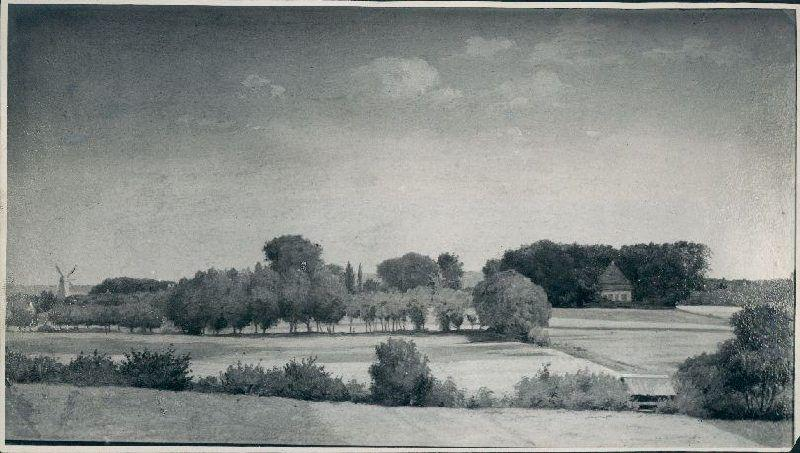
Rolighed seen from Gammel Kongevej in 1850

Rolighedsvej Godthåbsvej originates in one of the oldest roads in the area. Associated with Ladegården, a farm established by Christian IV, although possibly considerably older, it was the first of several "royal roads" in the area. From 1664, it was referred to as "Den gamle Kongevej" ("The Old Royal Road") to distinguish it from New Royal Road (now Gammel Kongevej). It was for centuries also known as the Islevvej (Islev Road) and later as Granddalsvej (Grøndal Road). From circa 1855, the inner part of the road became known as Rolighedsvej after the country house Rolighed which had stood on the side of the road since circa 1770. The other part of the street was renamed Godshåbsvej after Store Godthåb, another country house.

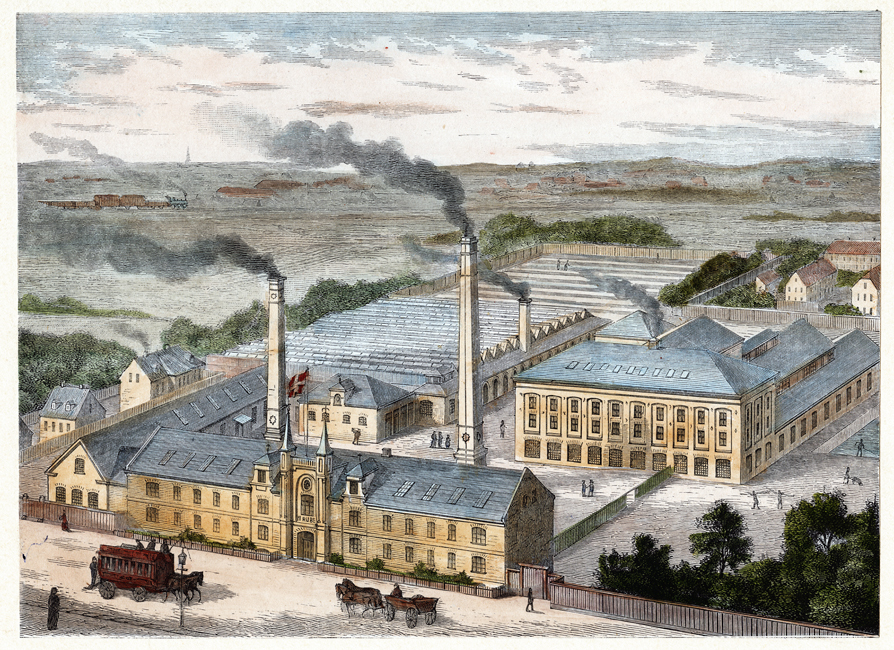
J.H. Rubens Fabrikker

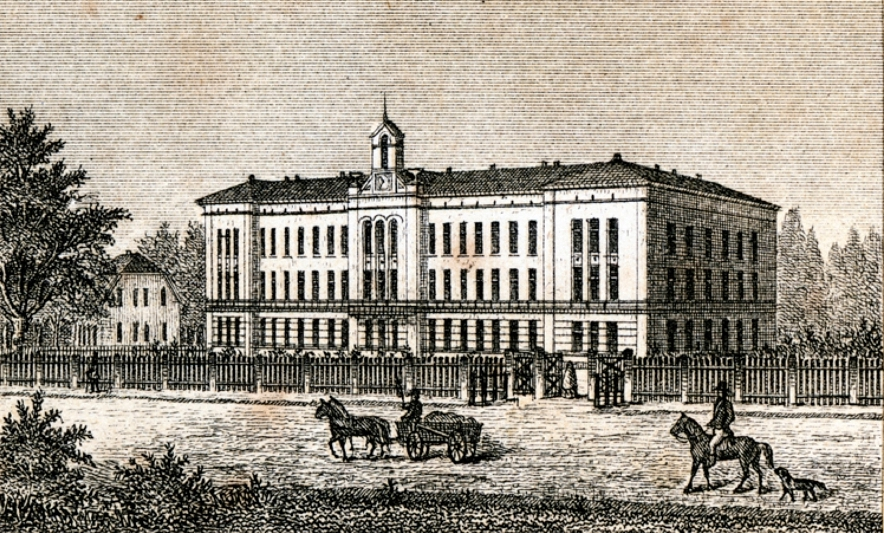
Københavns Sygehjem

Several large new buildings were constructed along the road in the 1850s. J. H. Rubens Fabrik, a textile factory, opened at the corner with Falkoner Alle in 1854.

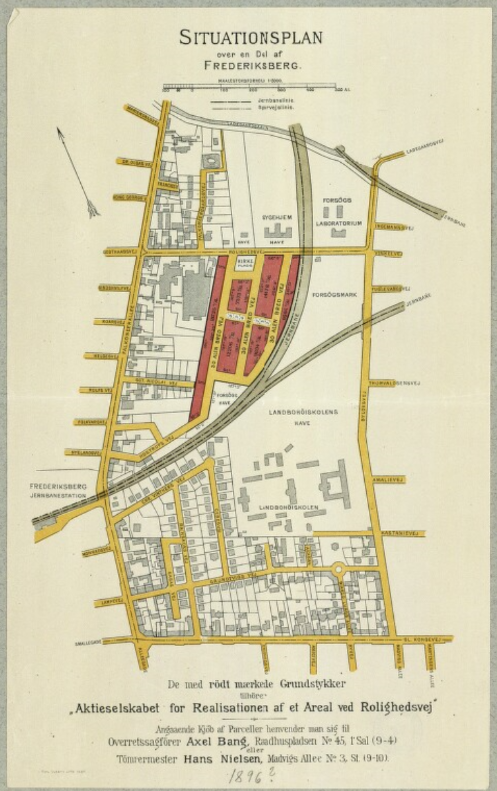
Rolighedsvej seen on a situation plan from 1896

Københavns Sygehjem, a private hospital, opened on the north side of the road in May 1859. A large site on the south side of the street was reserved for the Royal Veterinarian School. It moved into a large new building on Bülowsvej in 1859. Landøkonomiske Forsøgslaboratorium (Agricultural Economic Research Laboratory) opened next to Københavns Sygehjem 1882–1883.

Frederiksberg Sugar House (Frederiksberg Sukkerhus) was located at No. 18. It was founded in 1889 by Fritz Paustian (1862–1935).

The freight railway between Nørrebro and Frederiksberg crossed the street from the 1864. It existed until 1930. From 24 July 1884, Falkoneralléens Sporvejsselskab operated a tram service between Frederiksberg Runddel and Halmtorvet (now Rådhuspladsen) by way of Rolighedsvej.

Frederiksberg Iron Foundry and Machine Factory was founded at Falkoner Allé (No. 42) in 1872 but relocated to Rolighedsvej (No. 15) in the 1930s. The Royal Danish Agricultural Society (Det Kongelige Danske Landhusholdningsselskab) relocated to a building at No. 26. It was designed by Tyge Hvass.

== Notable buildings and residents ==
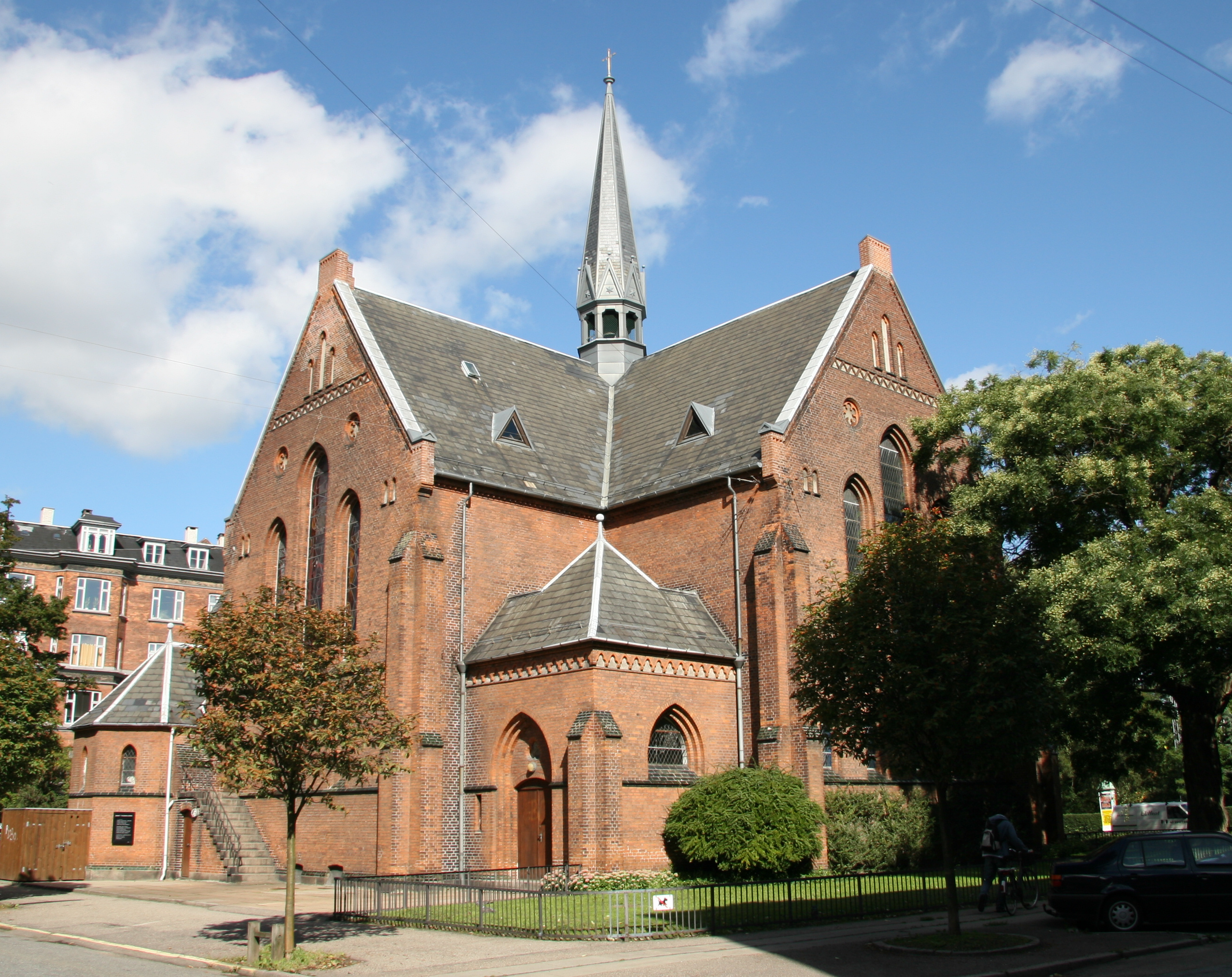
St. Thomas' Church

Hostrups Have (No. 8), a Functionalist housing estate, was built in 1935–36 to design by Hans Dahlerup Berthelsen. It is located at the site where Ruben's textile factory was previously located. It incorporates a central greenspace. Falkonerhuset (No. 15-18), a Historicist property from 1897, was designed by G. Hassing.

St Thomas' Church (No, 16) is a Church of Denmark parish church. It was inaugurated in 1898 to a design by Carl Lendorf.

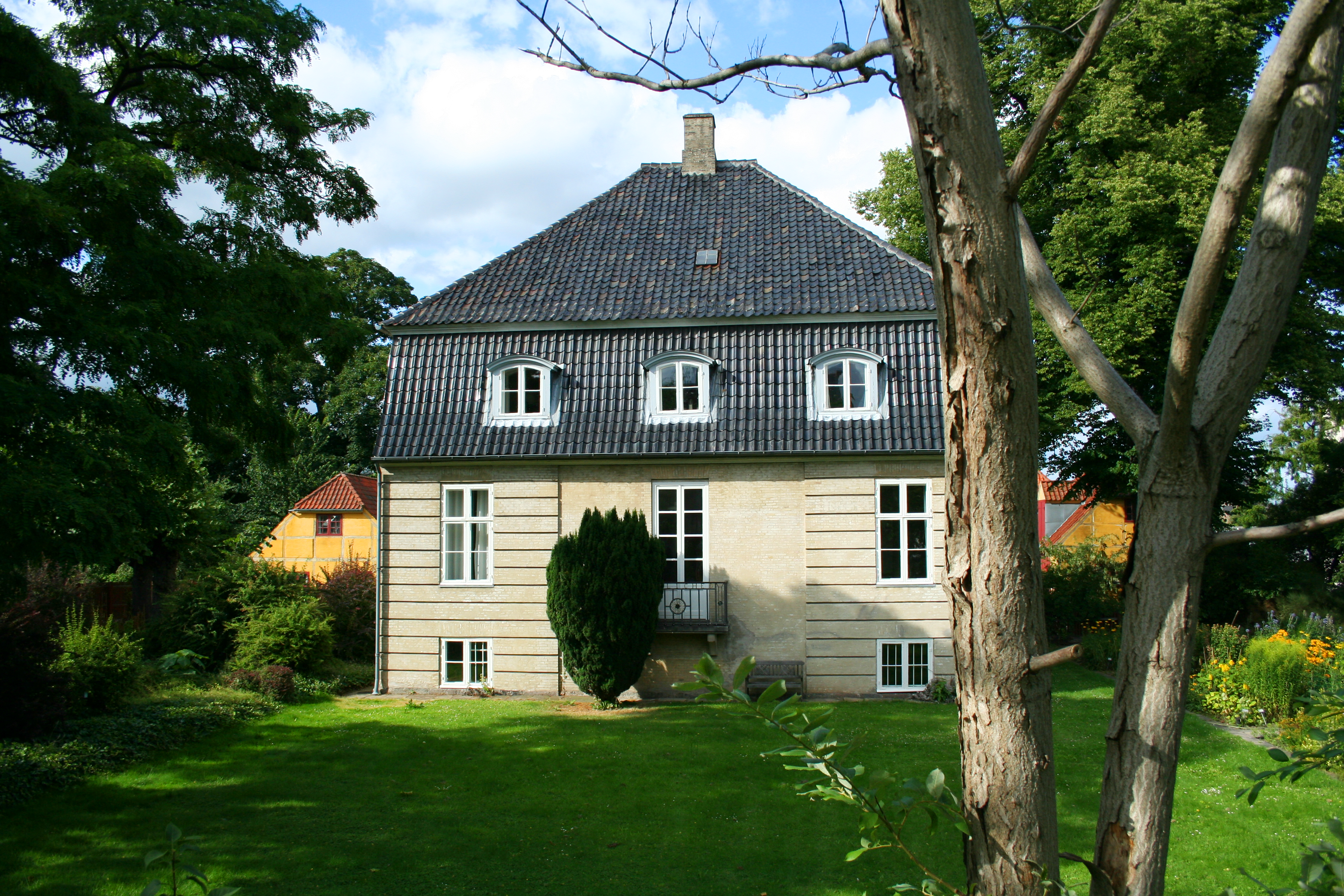
Rolighed

Rolighed (No. 21) is today owned by the University of Copenhagen. Built in about 1770, it is one of few surviving examples of the summer retreats which dominated Frederiksberg from the late 18th century and until the area was absorbed by the expanding city in the second half of the 19th century. To the rear of the building is a group of associated stables and other farm buildings arranged around a central courtyard.

Københavns Sygehjem's former building (No. 23) is now home to the University of Copenhagen's Department of Geosciences and Natural Resource Management. The Late Neoclassical building is from 1859 and was designed by Harald Conrad Stilling. It was expanded by Rørbæk & Møller Arkitekter in 2013.

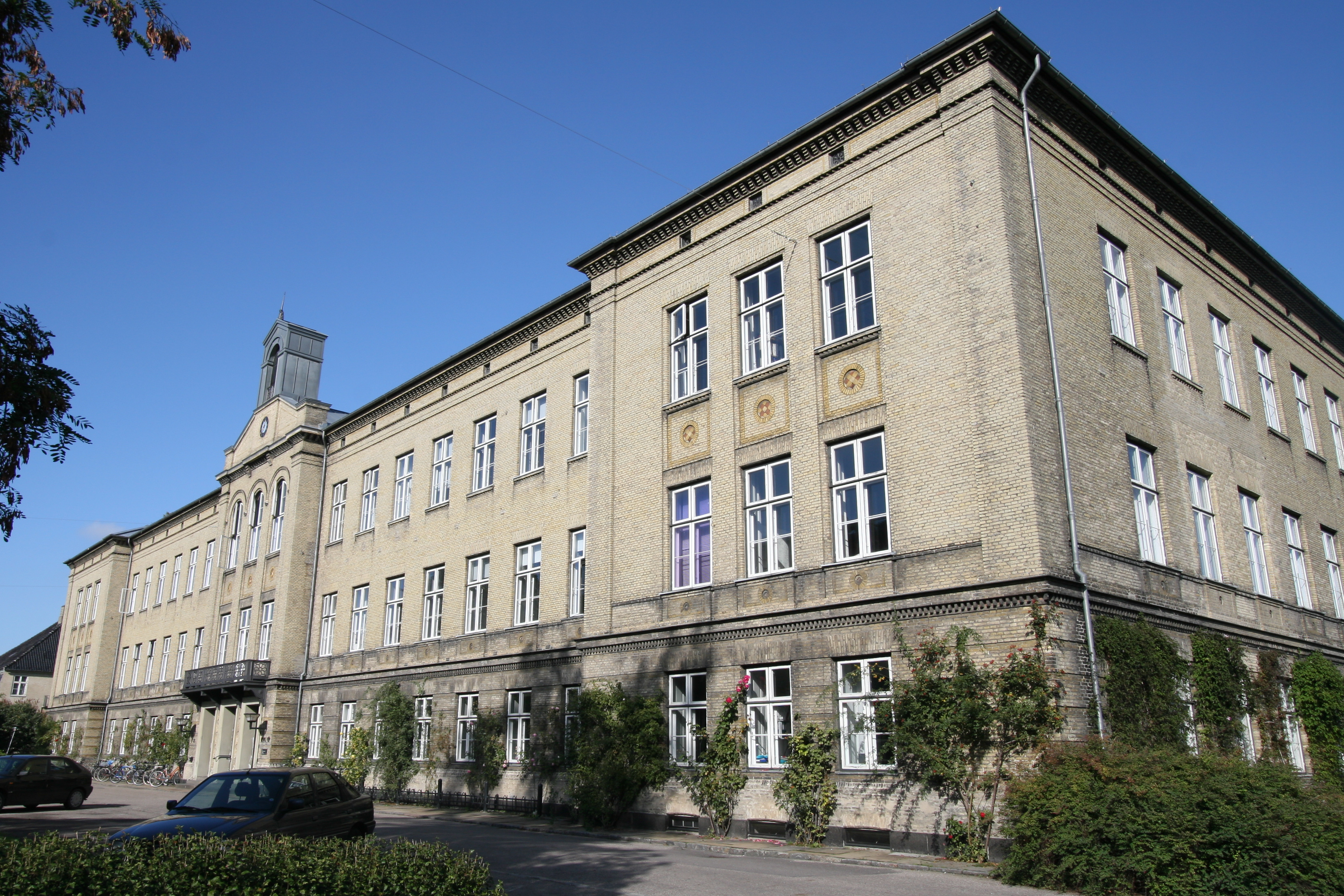
Rolighedsvej 23

Landøkonomisk Forsøgslaboratorium's former building (No. 25) is now home to the Department of Food and Resource Economy. The building is from 1883 and was designed by Ludvig Fenger. It was expanded with a free-standing building designed by Hans Georg Skovgaard to the east in 1935. The two buildings are now connected by a glazed skywalk. The complex has been sold to the Lycée Français Prins Henrik. The school will relocate to the site once an extension has been completed in 2021.

== Public art ==
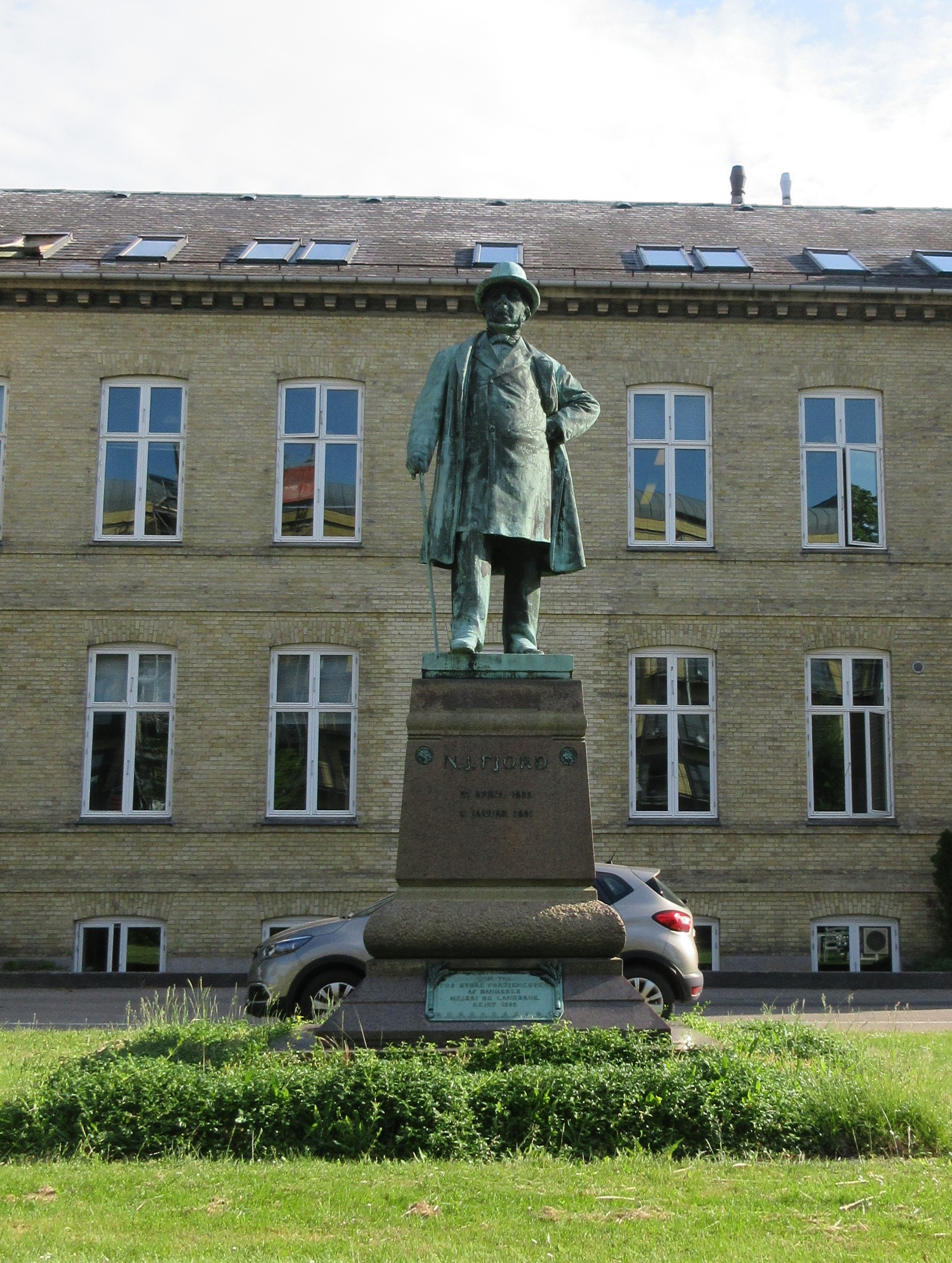
Statue of N. J. Fjord

In front of Landøkonomisk Forsøgslaboratorium's former building (No. 25) stands a bronze statue of Niels Johannes Fjord. The statue is from 1892 and was created by Aksel Hansen. Fjord was a driving force behind the foundation of the institution and served as its president until his death. He was also president of the Royal Danish Society for Agriculture (Det Kongelige Danske Landhusholdningsselskab). Nearby N. J. Fjords Allé is also named after Fjord.

== Transport ==
The Forum (East) and Frederiksberg (Southwest) metro stations are both located approximately 500 metres from the street. Both stations serve the M1 and M2 lines. A new metro station on the City Circle Line will open at Aksel Møllers Have, some 300 m to the west of the street, in 2019.

The former railway tracé has been converted into a super bikeway.
