= I. H. Rubens Fabrikker =

Denmark textile company

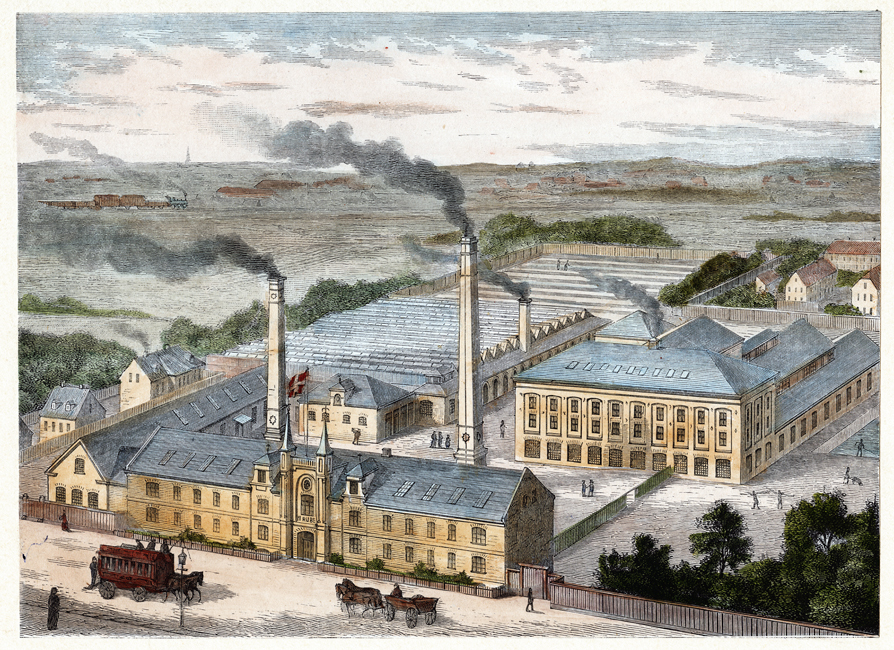
J.H. Rubens Fabrikker

I. H. Rubens Fabrikker was a textile company based in Copenhagen, Denmark. Its factory complex on Rolighedsvej in Frederiksberg was in the late 19th century the largest factory of its kind in Denmark as well as the largest employer of women. The factory was demolished in the 1940s and has now been replaced by Hostrups Have, a Functionalist housing estate arranged around a central greenspace.

== History ==
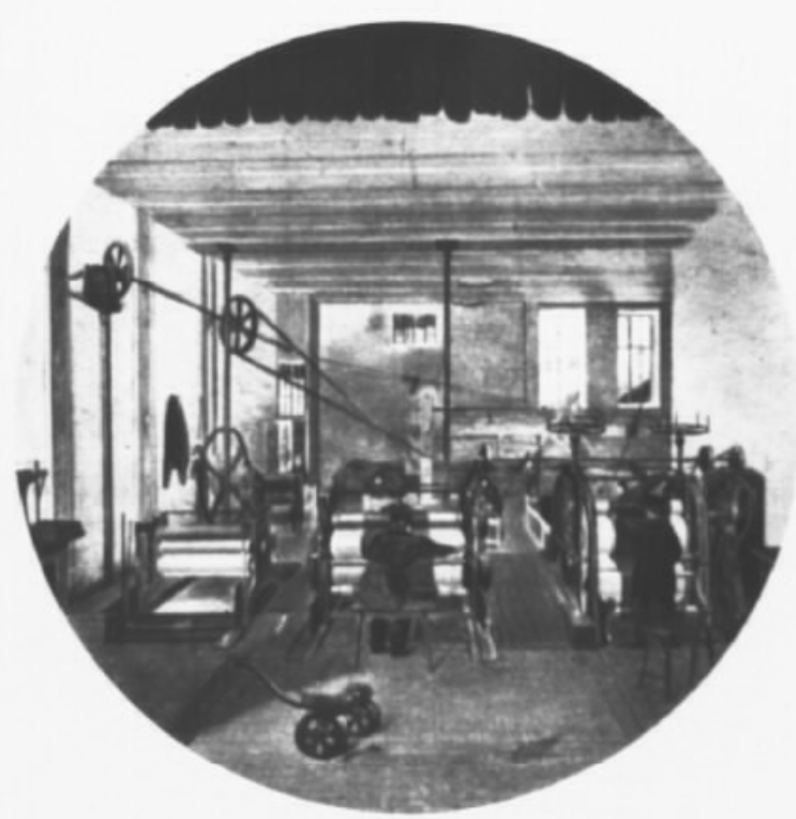
Kronprinsessegade 8 seen on J. H. Ruben's ceremonial target from the Royal Copenhagen Shooting Society

I. H. Ruben was born on 10 August 1789 in Copenhagen, the son of Hendel Jacob Ruben (c. 1746–1807) and Judithe Cantor (c. 1753–1829). His father had established a calico printing workshop in 1780. Ruben was articled to his father and continued the business after his death on a new concession from 1810. He also moved into dyeing and treatment of textiles, introducing steam power in 1844.

Ruben was the owner of the property at Kronprinsessegade 8 from before 1840. His business was then based in the rear wing of the building complex.His home was on the ground floor of the front wing.

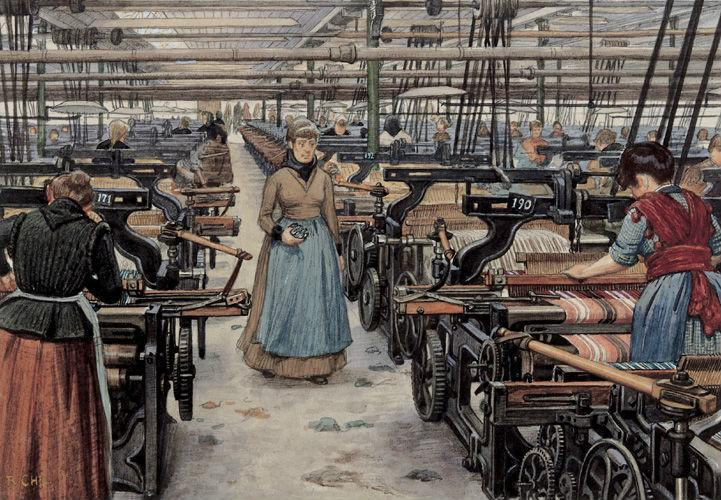
Women at work in the Weaving Hall, 1889

In 1859, Ruben established a cotton mill at Rolighedsvej and the factory was expanded several times over the next few years. The company had towards the end of the century grown to the largest textile company in the country as well as the largest employer of women.

Ruben's son Bernhard Harald Ruben (1829–96) became a partner in the company in 1862 and continued it alone after his father's death. The factory was rebuilt after a fire in 1876. He expanded it with a bleaching plant in 1877. Bernhard Tuben's widow Ida Ruben (née Coppel, 1845–1913) continued the operations from 1896. It was in 1901 ceded to their son Carl Ruben (1876–1967). The company was in 1907 converted into a limited company under the name Nordisk Tekstil Aktieselskab. It was in 1918 sold to Fredericia-based Bloch & Andresen. The new owner closed the factory on Rolighedsvej in connection with a reconstruction in 1926.
