= Kronprinsessegade 8 =

Historic building in Copenhagen, Denmark

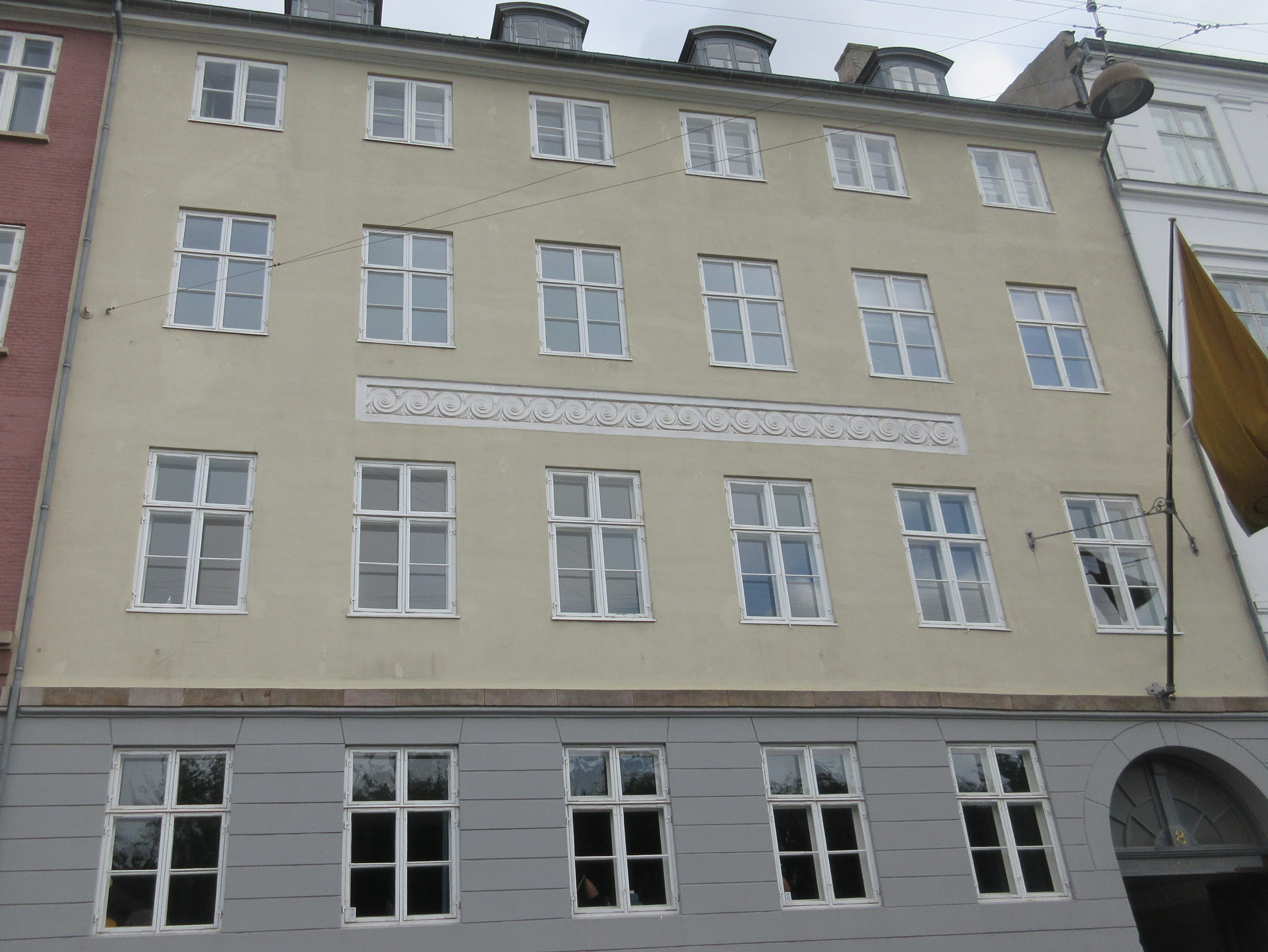
- Interactive map of the Kronprinsessegade 8 area

General information
- Location: Copenhagen, Denmark
- Coordinates: 55°40′59.33″N 12°34′52.75″E
- Completed: 1804

Design and construction
- Architect: Johan Martin Quist

Kronprinsessegade 8, also known as Revisorenes Hus (The Auditors House) after its current owner, FSR - Danish Auditors, is a listed, Neoclassical property overlooking Rosenborg Castle Garden in central Copenhagen, Denmark. The building was listed on the Danish register of protected buildings and places in 1845.

== History ==
=== Early history ===
Kronprinsessegade 8 was built by Johan Martin Quist for Jeremias Henriques and Jacob Henriques in 1803-1804. The property was listed in the new cadastre of 1806 as No. 386 in St. Ann's West Quarter.

Jeremias Henriques(born c. 1868) was a leather and wallpaper manufacturer. He was married to Johanne Mariboe (born c. 1765). They resided at No. 276 in St. Ann's Quarter (later Adelgade 77). Quist was himself a resident in the building after selling his previous home at Store Strandstræde 18.

The composer Christoph Ernst Friedrich Weyse lived in an apartment in the building from 1815. In September 1817, a 14-year-old Hans Christian Andersen came to the apartment to pick up the first portion of a monthly allowance. It was the result of a fund-raising that Weyse had initiated at a dinner party held by Giuseppe Siboni the previous evening. Weyse moved to a new apartment in the building at No. 36. He was very fond of the street and it was said about him that "he never ventured out of Kronprinsessegade and the 6/8 time".

The later politician Christian Albrecht Bluhme, then a defence judge advocate (auditør) in the Second Jutland Infantry Regiment, was a resident in the building in 1821. Frederik Bülow, then a lieutenant in the Royal Danish Army, lived in the building in 1821–22.

=== 1834 census ===
Jost van Docum, a counter admiral, resided on the ground floor at the 1834 census. He lived there with his wife Jost van Docum, their three sons (aged 24 to 32), one male servant and two maids.

=== Ruben family ===
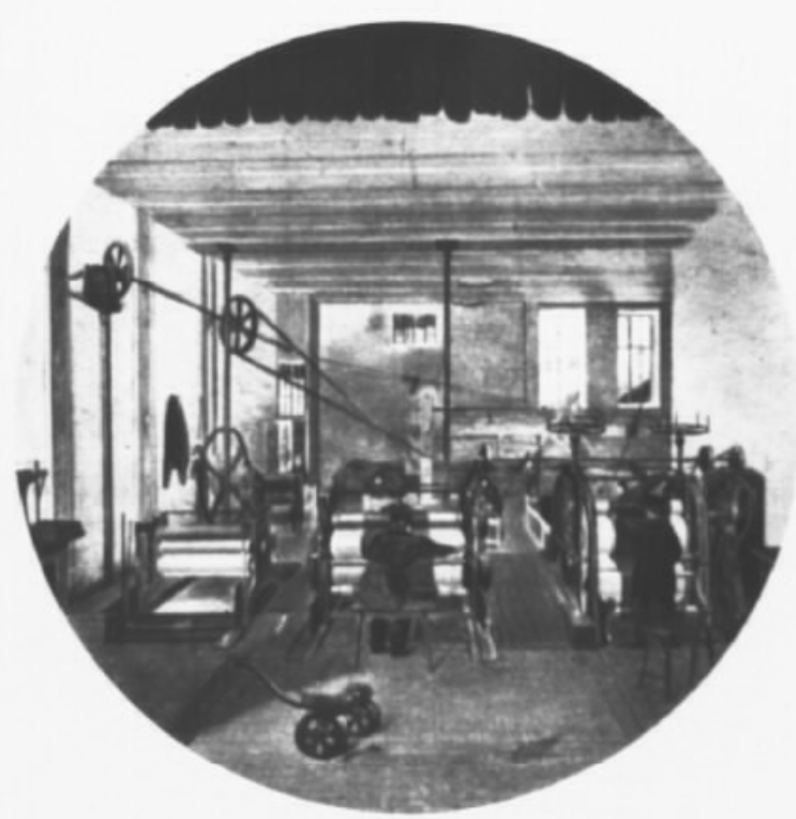
Kronprinsessegade 8 seen on J. H. Ruben's ceremonial target from the Royal Copenhagen Shooting Society

The property was at some point acquired by the textile manufacturer Isak Hendel Ruben. His textile workshop was located in the rear wing.

Isaac Hend. Ruben resided on the ground floor at the 1840 census. He lived there with his wife Susanne Ruben (née Bloch), their three children (aged six to 3), one male servant, two maids and the lodger Hans Peter Lorentzen (ironmonger). Edvard Gottschalk, a businessman (grosserer), resided on the first floor with his wife Julie Gottschalk, their three children (aged five to 12), one male servant and two maids. Lars Svane, a businessman (mægler), resided on the second floor with his wife Julie Anette Svane (née Clausen), their three children (aged two to 21), one male servant and two maids. Georg Coldevin, a captain in the King's Regiment, resided on the third floor with his wife Christine Coldevin født Blicher Olsen, three sisters named Bugel (aged 12 to 22, daughter of a wholesale merchant) and one maid.

Rubem's property was home to 27 residents in five households at the time of the 1845 census. Isaac H. Ruben and his wife Susanne Blachm still resided on the ground floor with their four children (aged 11 to 22) and two maids. Elisabeth Ida Margrethe Cederfeld de Simonsen (1792–1883), widow of Hans Wilhelm Cederfeld de Simonsen (1777–1836), resided on the first floor with two of her children (aged 26 and 27). Lars Svane (1790–1874), a goods broker, resided on the second floor with his wife Julie Clausen(1796–1887), two of their sons and one maid. The eldest of the sons was the later bishop of Viborg Jørgen Svane (1821–1903). Carl Eduard Moldenhawer, inspector at the Royal Danish Library, resided on the third floor with his wife Marie Elise Brockhausen, their three children (aged three to 15), a maid and the painter Carl Andreas Isling.

In 1857, Ruben constructed a large new textile mill at Rolighedsvej in Frederiksberg. He died in 1868.

=== Later history ===
Bloch & Andresen, Nordisk Tekstil, a textile company, was based in the building in 1950.

The property belonged to Erik Hermansen from at least the middle of the 1950s. Danske Revisorer bought it in the 1970s. In 2023, Danske Tevisorer sold the building to COPI Group.

== Architecture ==
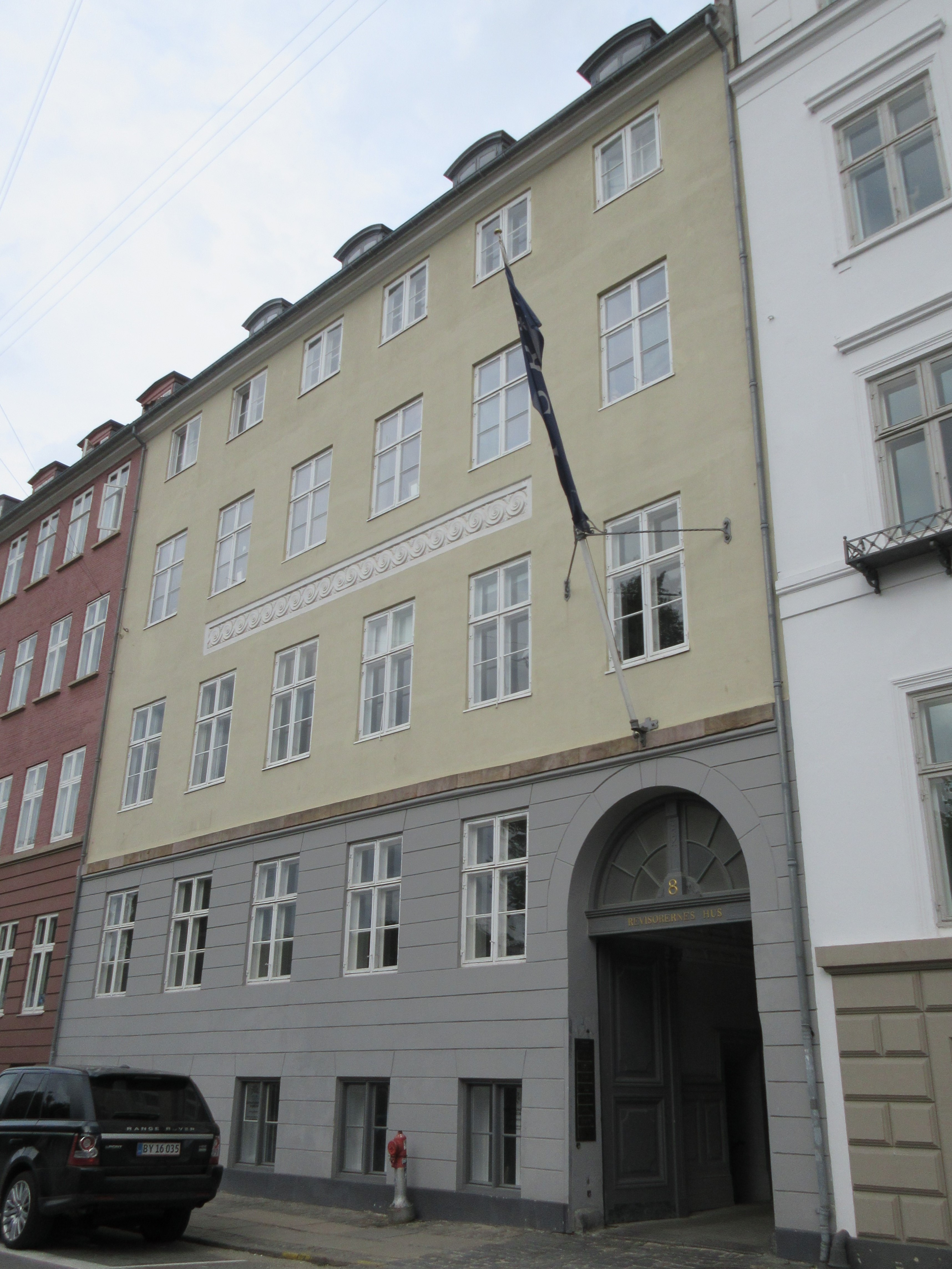
The gateway facade

Kronprinsessegade is a six-bays-wide building constructed with four storeys over a walk-out basement. The facade is finished with shadow joints on the ground floor and the exposed part of the basement. A frieze is seen between the first and second floor. A gateway in the right side of the building opens to a courtyard. A six-bay side wing extends from the rear side of the building and connects to a six-bay rear wing at the bottom of the courtyard.

== Today ==
FSR - Danish Auditors is based in the building. Varmings Tegnestue has refurbished the building. The warehouse in the courtyard was adapted for use as canteen.

== Gallery ==
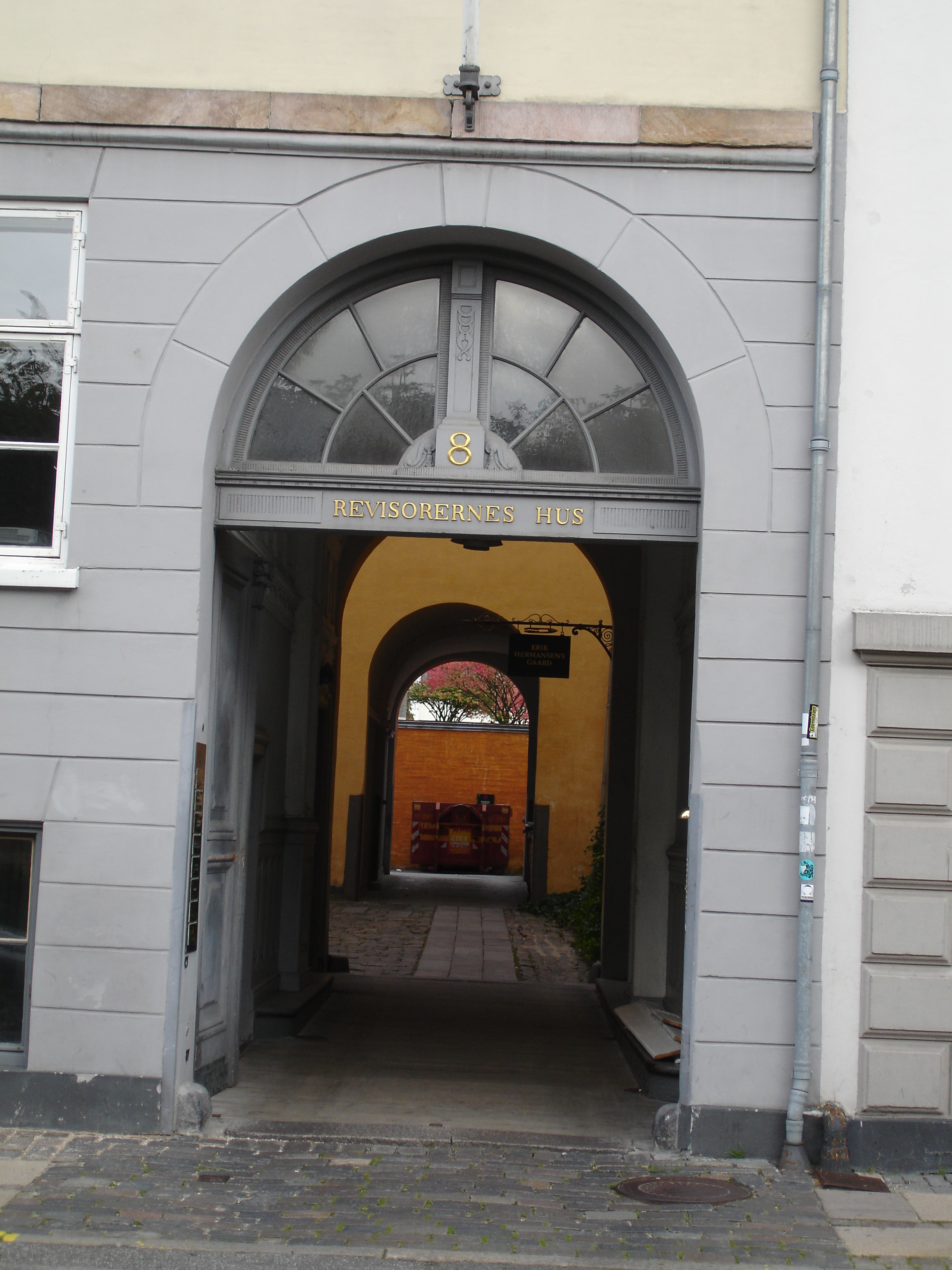
The gateway seen from the street

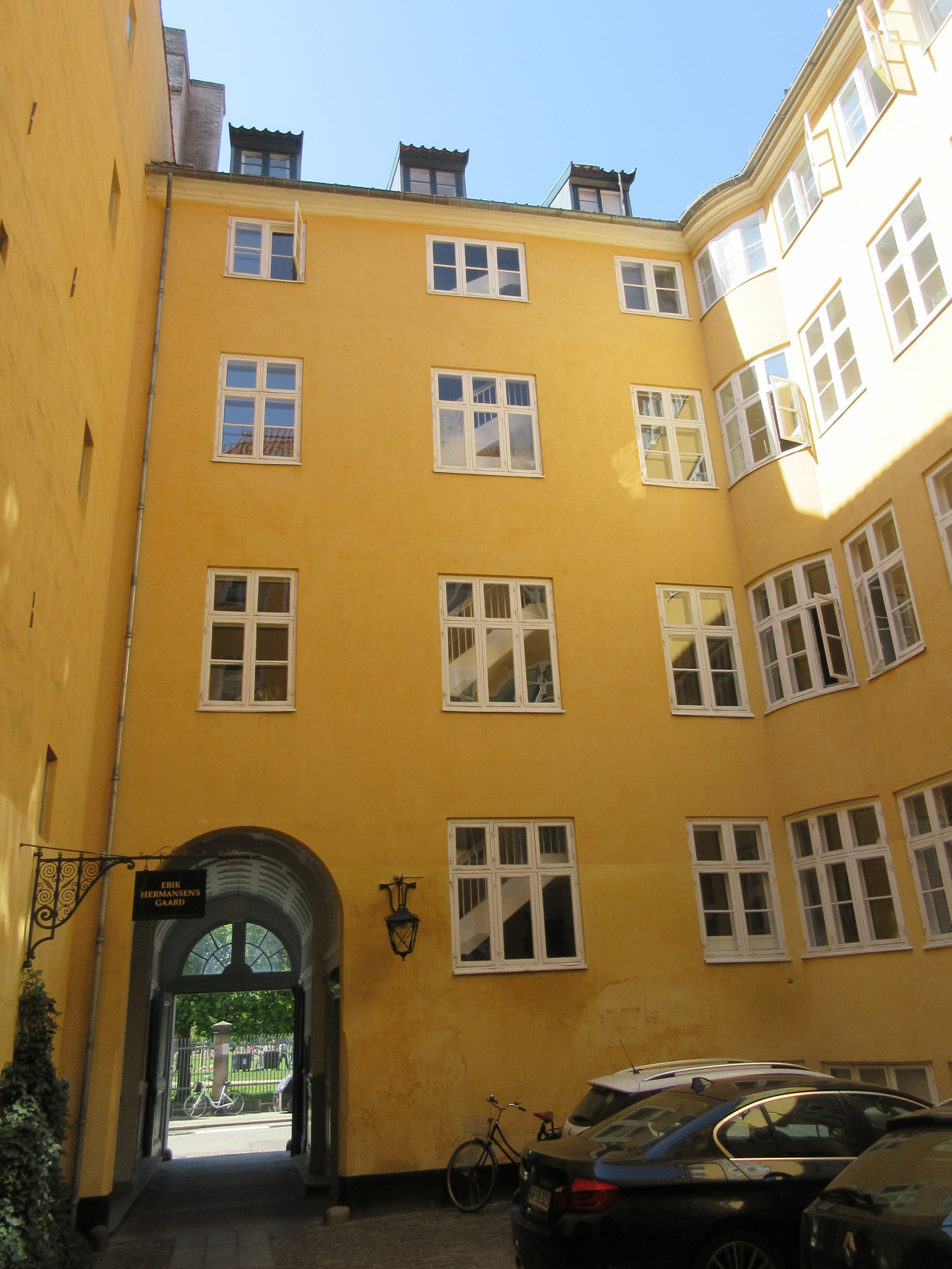
The rear side of the main wing

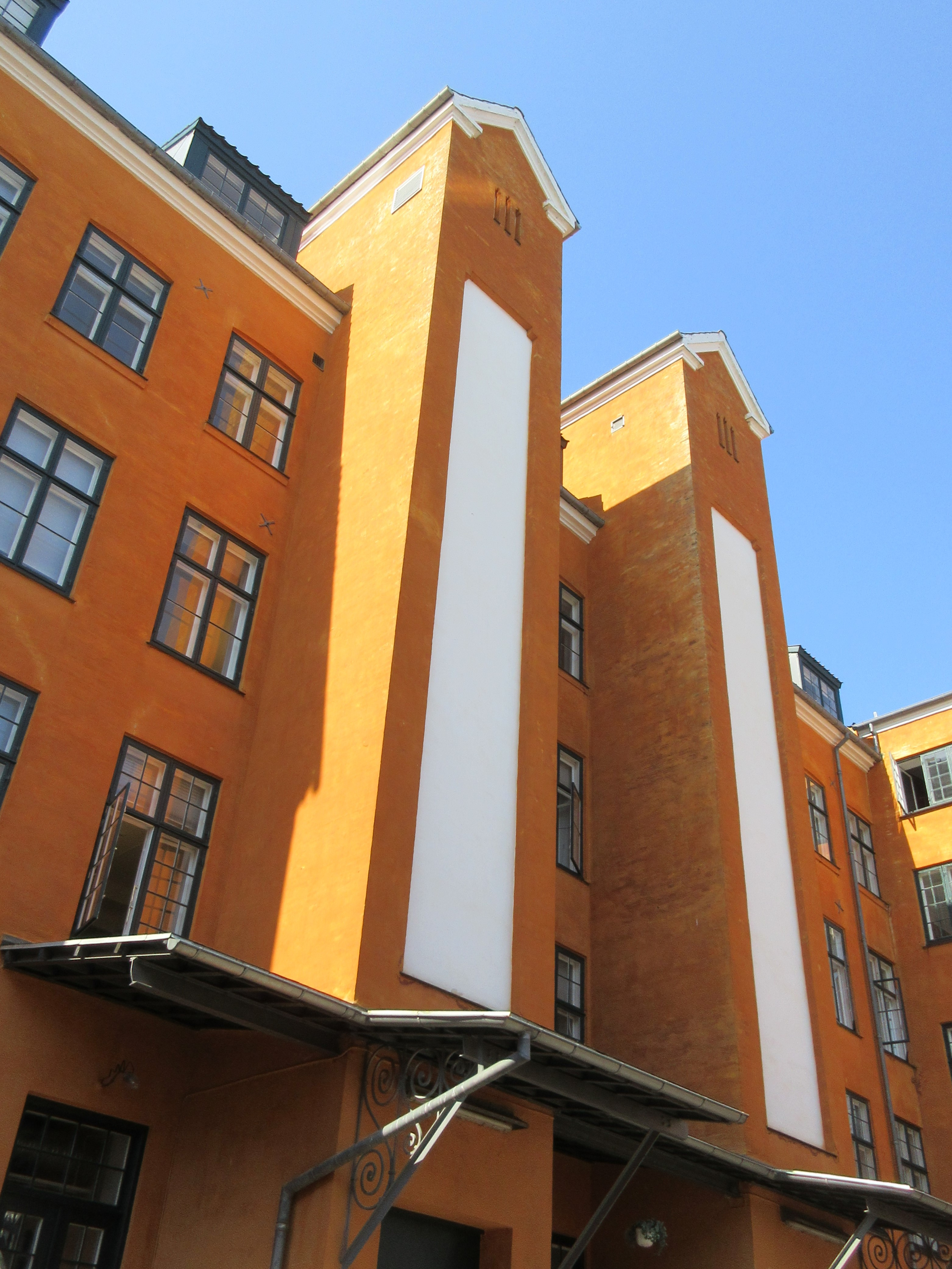
The side wing

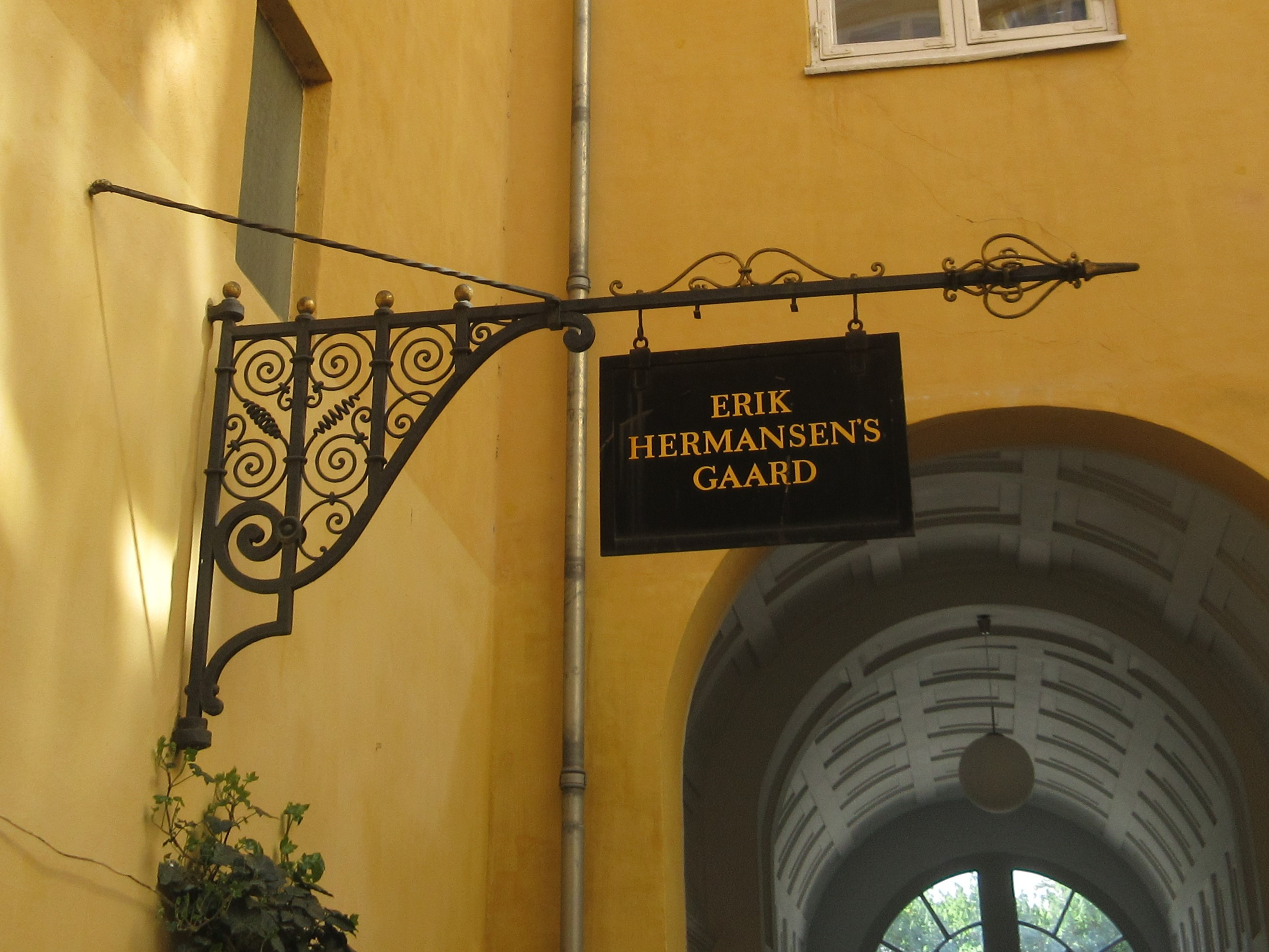
Sign in the courtyard
