= Godthåbsvej =

Street in Copenhagen, Denmark

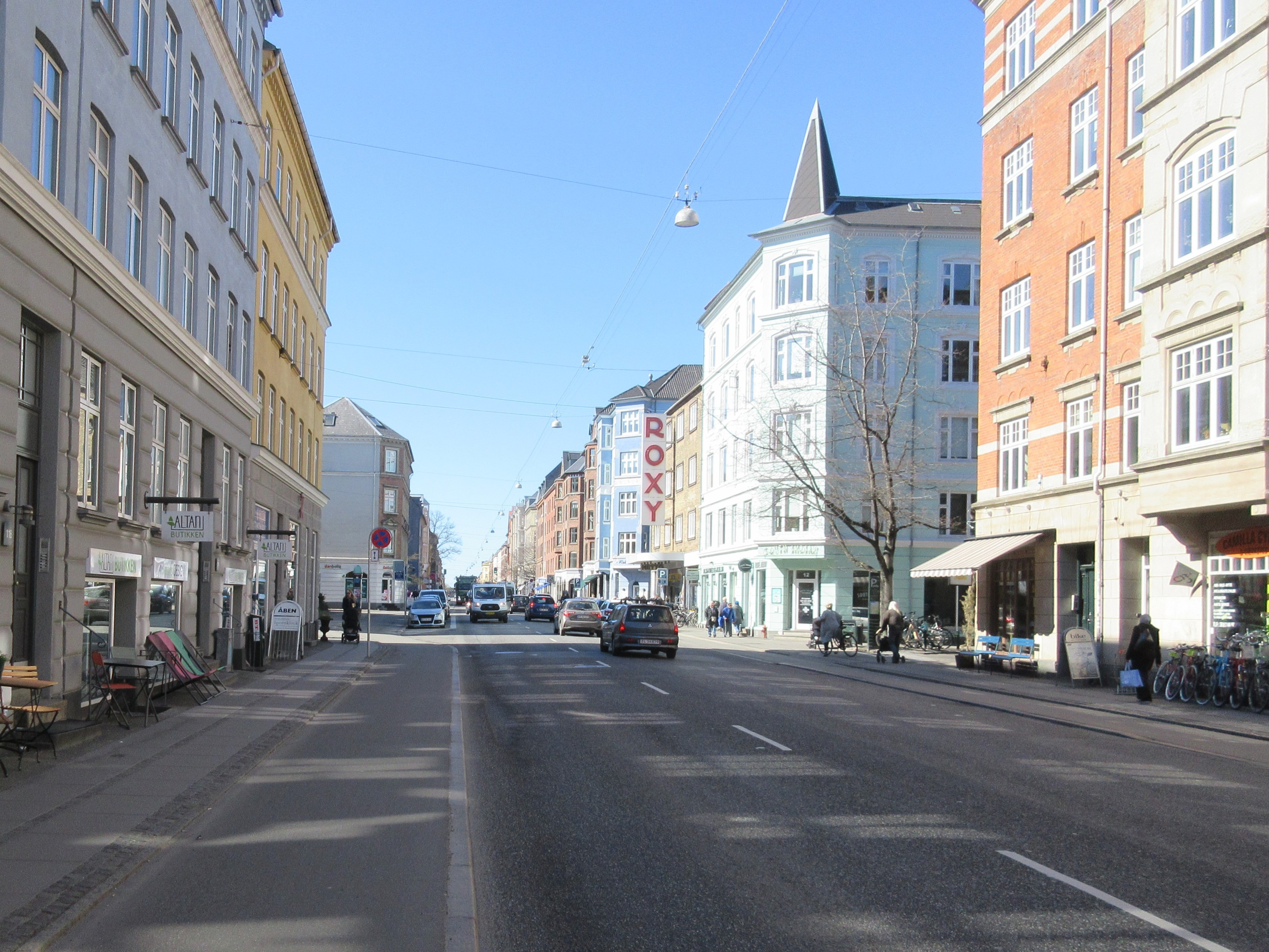
- Interactive map of Godthåbsvej
- Length: 2,350 m (7,710 ft)
- Location: Frederiksberg, Copenhagen, Denmark
- Postal code: 2000 (No. 1-176), 2720 (No. 177-)
- Nearest metro station: Grøndal
- Coordinates: 55°41′16.44″N 12°31′39.72″E
- Southeast end: Rolighedsvej
- Major junctions: Nordre Fasanvej
- Northwest end: Bellahøj

Godthåbsvej is a street in the northwestern part of Copenhagen, Denmark. It begins at Bülowsvej in Frederiksberg as the direct continuation of Rosenørns Allé/Rolighedsvej and passes through Vanløse before reaching Bellahøj in Brønshøj. A metro station on the Copenhagen Metro City Circle Line is located at Aksel Møllers Have.

== History ==
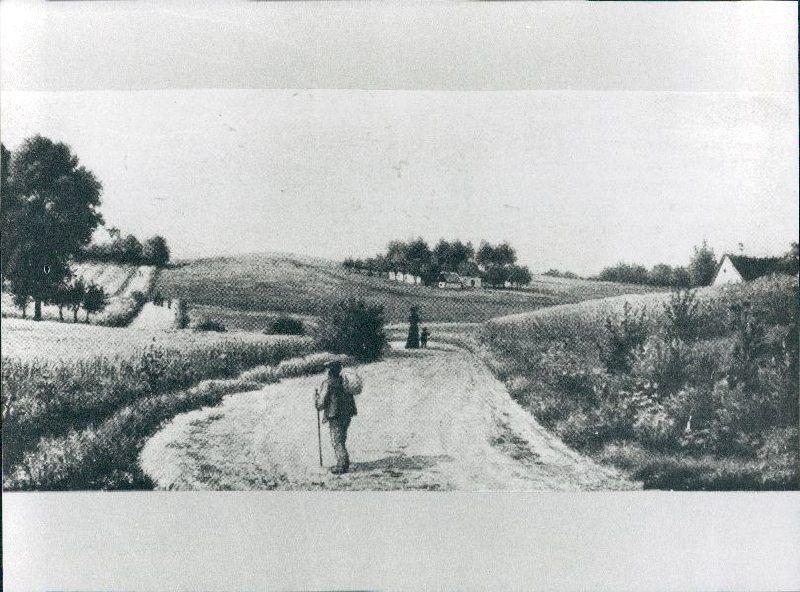
Godthåbsvej at present-day Grøndals Allé, 1890

It is unclear when Godthåbsvej was built, but it is one of the oldest roads in the area. Associated with Ladegården, a farm established by Christian IV, although possibly much older, it was the first of several "royal roads" in the area. From 1664, it was referred to as "Den gamle Kongevej" ("The Old Royal Road") to distinguish it from New Royal Road (now Gammel Kongevej). It was for centuries also known as the Islevvejen (Islev Road) and later as Granddalsvej (Grøndal Road). From circa 1855, the outer part of the road became known as Godthåbsvej after the country house Store Godthab, which had stood on the side of the road since 1770. The inner part of the street was renamed Rolighedsvej after Rolighed, another country house.

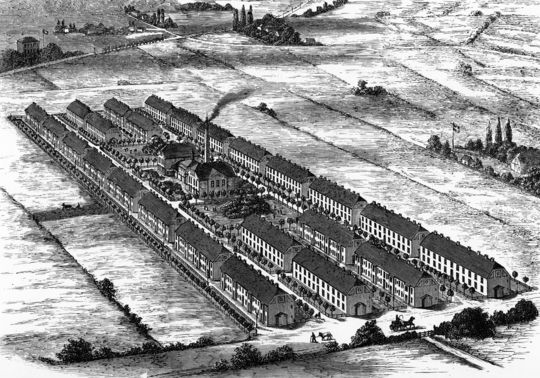
The Classen Terraces in 1868

More houses began to appear along the inner (eastern) part of the road from the middle of the 19th century. The Classen Terraces were built for indigent workers by the Classenske Fideicommis in 1866–1880.

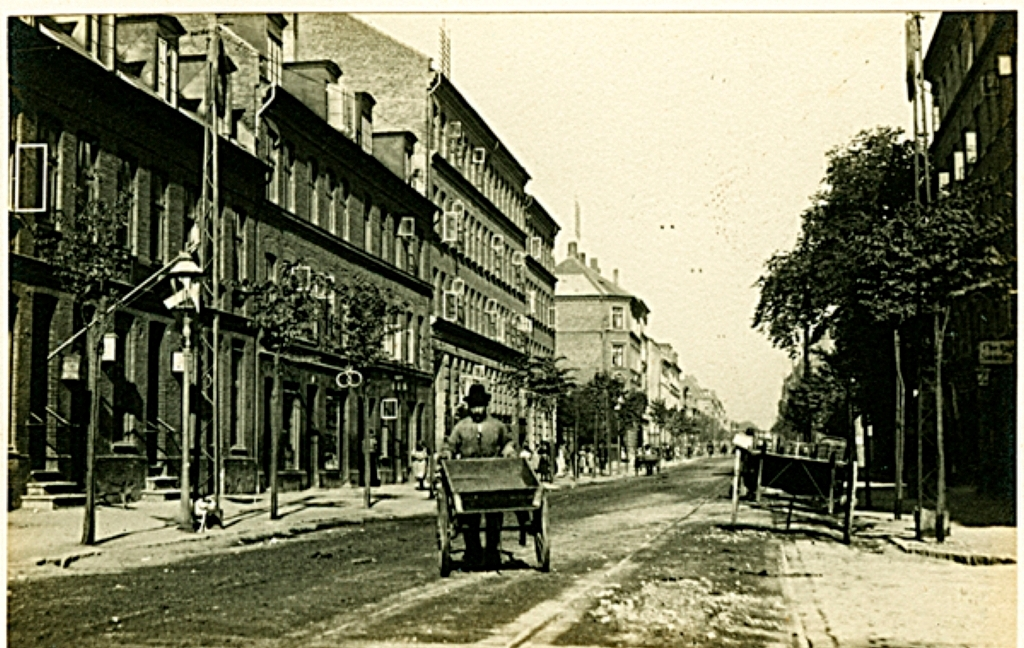
Godthåbsvej in 1899

Towards the end of the century many of the low, scattered buildings were replaced by taller blocks.

Further out, west of Nordre Fasanvej, the only buildings along the street were a couple of factories and some allotments, which continued well into the 20th century.

== Notable buildings and residents ==
Aksel Møllers Have (Godthåbsvej 35–41) is a Modernist housing estate built in 1946 to design by Sigurd Tanggaard. Godthaab Church, located on Nylandsvej, just off Godthåbsvej, is from 1909 and was designed by Gotfred Tvede.

The 3-story apartment buildings Godthåbshus, Grøndalshus and Fordreshus (Godthåbsvej 182–208, Rønnebærvej 2–12) were built in 1926–27 based on the design by Thorkild Henningsen and Karl Larsen. Thorkild Henningsen also designed the slightly younger terraced housing development Fuglebakken 1928–29. It consists of a total of 165 houses located on the streets Godthåbsvej, Duevej, Fuglebakkevej, Drosselvej, Solsortevej, Vagtelvej and Egernvej.

Grøndalshuset, on the corner with Sallingevej (No. 2–4) in Vanløse, is a housing estate designed by Frits Schlegel in 1936.

== Transport ==
Grøndal railway station (formerly Godthåbsvej railway station) is located on the border between Frederiksberg and Vanløse. The station is located on the Ring Line of the S-train system and is served by the F trains.

One of the stations, Aksel Møllers Have, on the City Circle Line of the Copenhagen Metro is located at Aksel Møllers Have.

== Cultural references ==
Handelsbanken's branch at Godthåbsvej 229 in Vanløse is used as a location at 0:10:37 in the 1972 Olsen-banden film The Olsen Gang's Big Score.

== See also ==
- Fuglebakken, Frederiksberg
