= Godthaab Church =

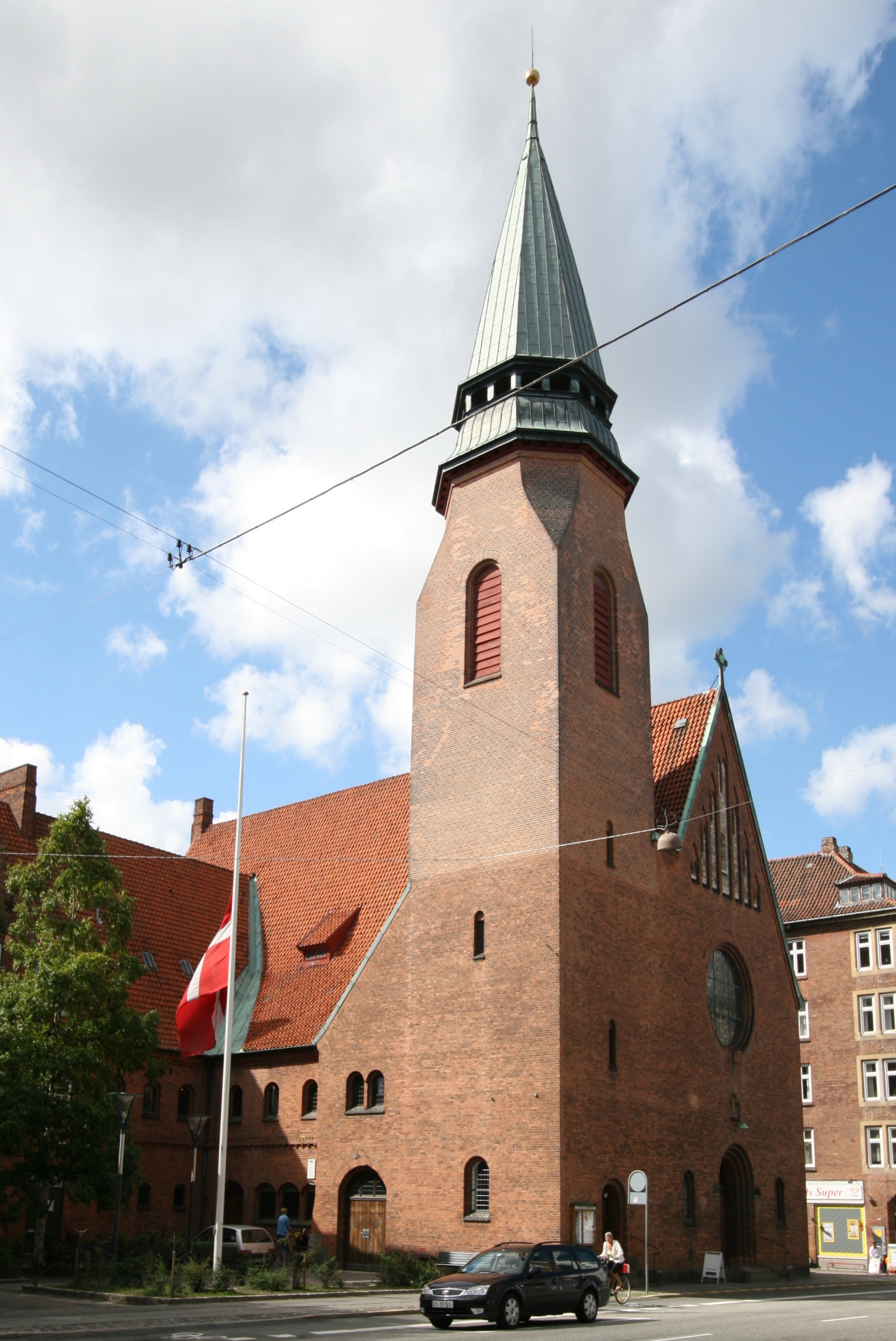
- Godthaab Church
- Godthaab Church
- 55°41′1.5″N 12°31′33.5″E
- Location: 51A Nyelandsvej; Frederiksberg, Copenhagen
- Country: Denmark
- Denomination: Church of Denmark
- Website: www.godthaabskirken.dk

History
- Status: Church

Architecture
- Architect: Gotfred Tvede
- Architectural type: Church
- Style: Neo-Baroque
- Groundbreaking: 3 October 1909
- Completed: 19 March 1911

Specifications
- Materials: Brick

Administration
- Archdiocese: Diocese of Copenhagen

Godthaab Church (Danish: Godthaabskirken) is a Church of Denmark parish church situated on Nyelandsvej in the northern part of the Frederiksberg district of Copenhagen, Denmark. Godthaab Parish is named after Godthåbsvej, the principal artery of the area.

== History ==
=== Classen Terraces and their church ===
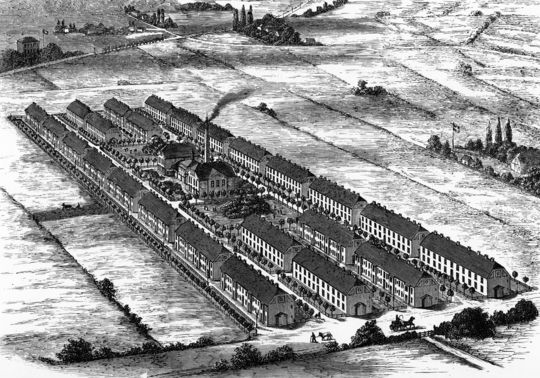
The Classen Terraces in 1868

Godthaab Church traces its history back to 1866 when the charitable foundation Det Classenske Fideicommis acquired a 3-hectare piece of land at the site from the Sindshvile estate. This was done to build residences for indigent workers, as the 1853 Copenhagen cholera outbreak had highlighted the dismal living conditions for this part of the population. From 1866 to 1881, the foundation constructed 24 terraces with a total of 378 residences. They were built in yellow brick in two storeys to designs by Vilhelm Tvede. The development also encompassed a community house, shops, laundry, an orphanage, and its own church, Classen Church, which was completed in 1880. At that point, the development had 1,288 residents, a number which had increased to 1,655 by 1895.

The Classen Terraces were initially praised and even received attention abroad, but as similar projects were built around the city, such as those of the Workers' Building Society, Det Classenske Fideicommis lost interest in the development. Due to the charitable nature of the foundation, it also showed great indulgence towards failure to pay rent, and the development gradually became a place for the very poor, eventually falling into neglect. This contrasted sharply with the surrounding community, and in 1909, Frederiksberg Municipality bought the entire development for demolition. However, due to housing shortages and economic constraints, the last terraces were not pulled down until the late 1950s.

=== The new church ===
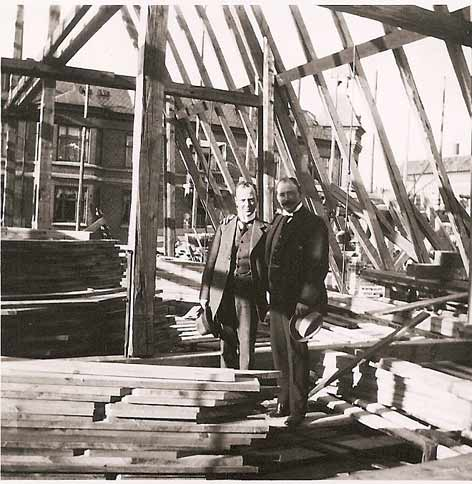
Gotfred Tvede at the construction site

In connection with the sale, the foundation reserved a sum of DKK 70,000 for the construction of a new church on a lot donated for the project by H. I. Nyeland, a well-to-do farmer.

Godthåb Parish was created on 30 September 1909 and comprised the Classen Terraces as well as parts of Mariendal, St. Luke's and St. Thomas' parishes. The parish, like Godthåbsvej, was named after Store Godthåb, an estate which the entire area had once belonged to.

Classen Church served as a temporary parish church until the new church was ready. Another DKK 55,000 was raised for the construction by a local church commission and Gotfred Tvede, the son of Vilhelm Tvede, was charged with the design of the new church building. The foundation stone was set on 3 October by the provost and later Bishop of Zealand, Harald Ostenfeld.

The church was inaugurated on 19 March 1911.

== Architecture ==
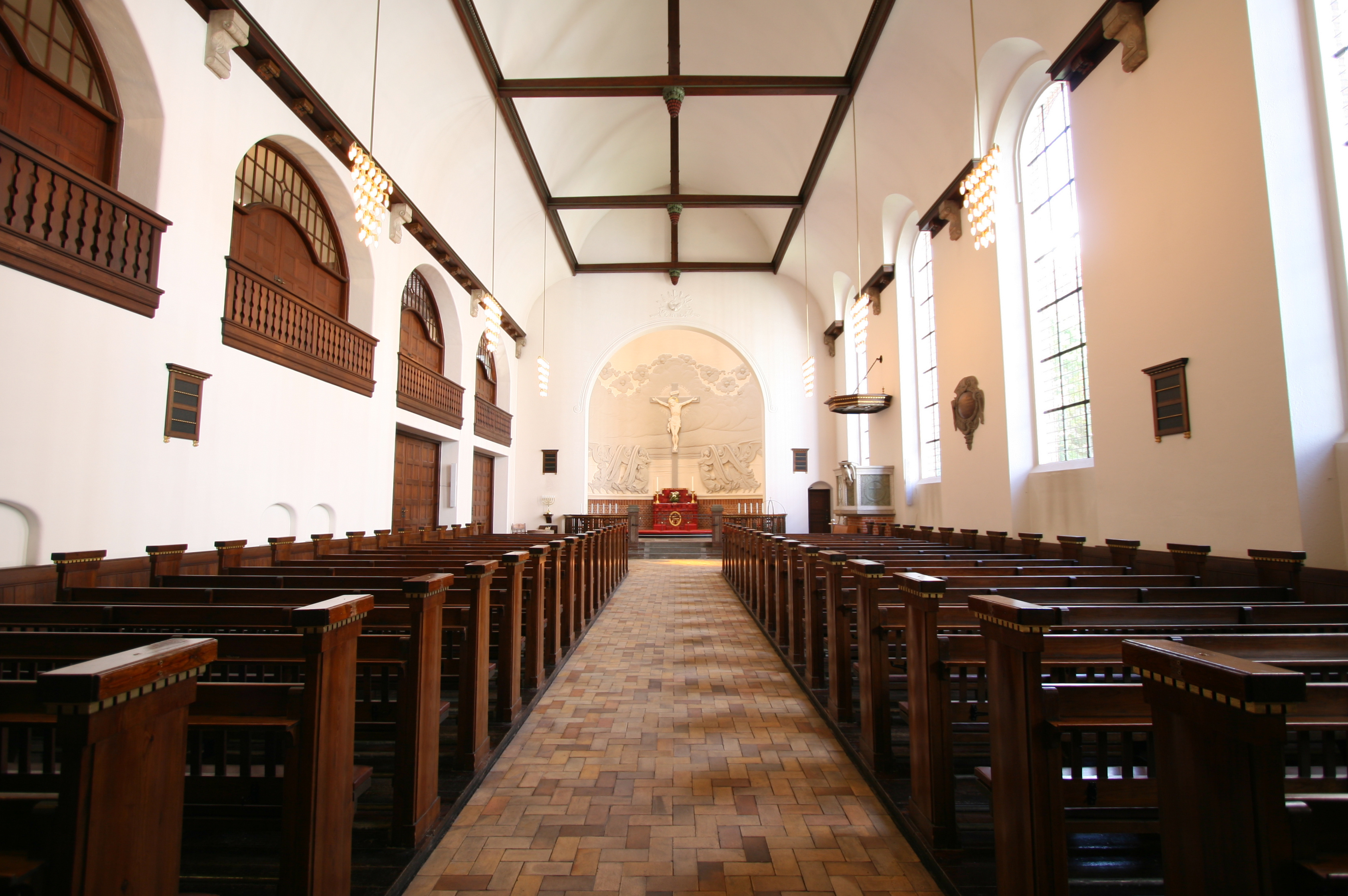
The interior

The church is built in red brick on a granite plinth. It is oriented north-south to accommodate its location on Nyelandsvej. It has a choir to the south and a tower with a copper-clad, octagonal belfry on the east side of the north gable.

The interior has white-washed walls and a barrel-vaulted ceiling with exposed timber structure. A series of round-arched windows on the west side provides natural light, and the choir, raised three steps from the nave, is top-lit. There is a gallery above the entrance in the north wall.

== Furnishings ==
The ceramic altar table is the work of Herman A. Kähler. The apse interior features a relief by sculptor Carl Mortensen depicting Christ on the Cross, surrounded by worshipping angels.
