= Aksel Møllers Have =

Housing estate in Copenhagen, Denmark

Coordinates: 55.6855°N 12.5329°E

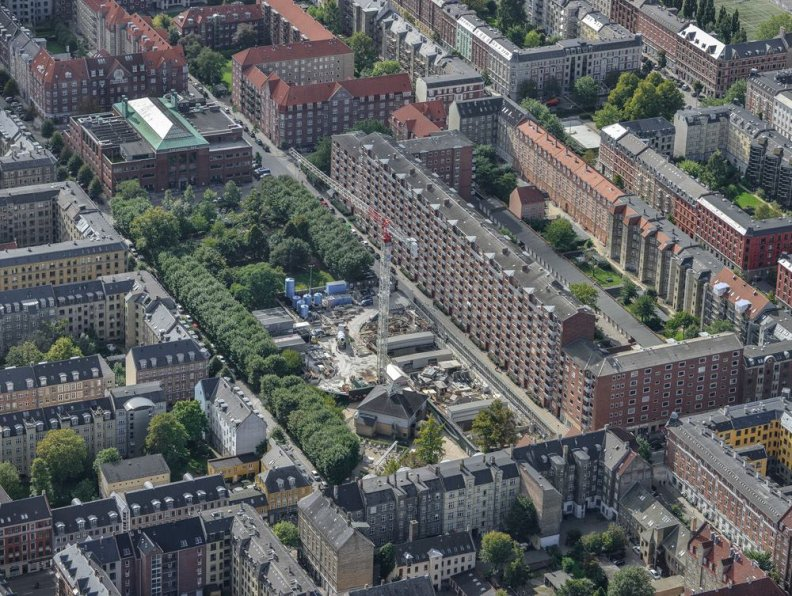
Aerial of Aksel Møllers Have with the metro construction site

Aksel Møllers Have is a public greenspace and early Modernist housing estate located at Godthåbsvej 35–41 in the Frederiksberg district of Copenhagen, Denmark. One of the stations on Copenhagen Metro's City Circle Line is located on the square.

== History ==
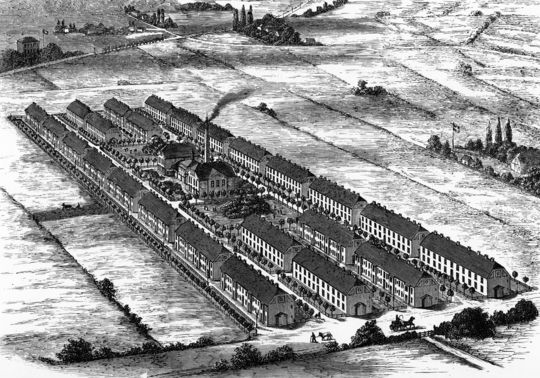
The Classen Terraces in 1868

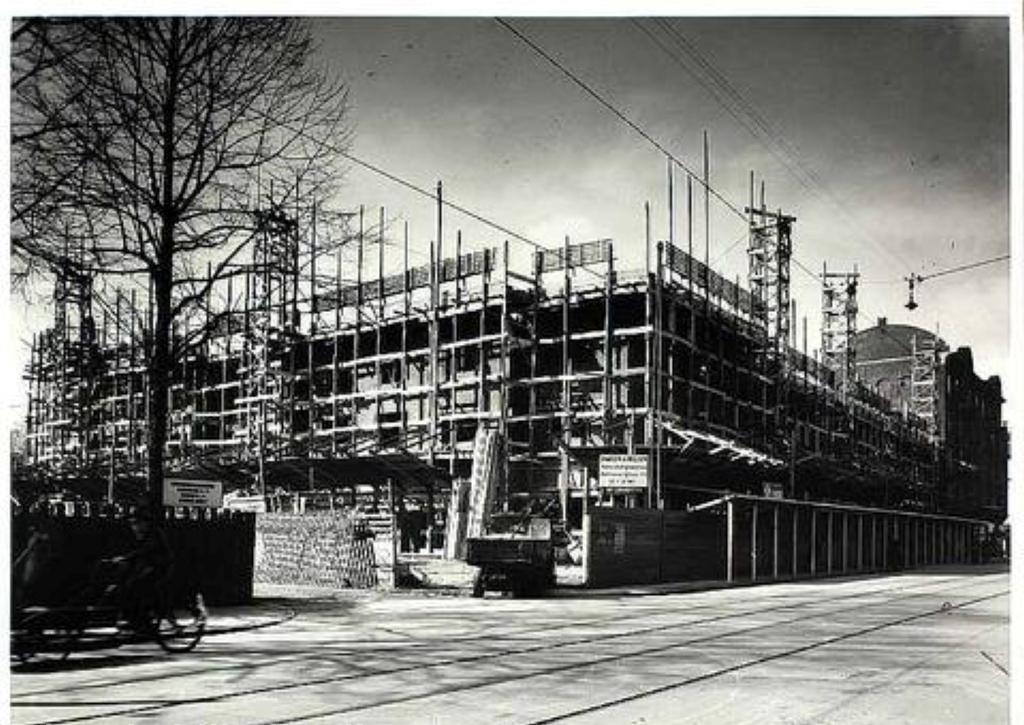
Godthåbs Have under construction, c. 1943

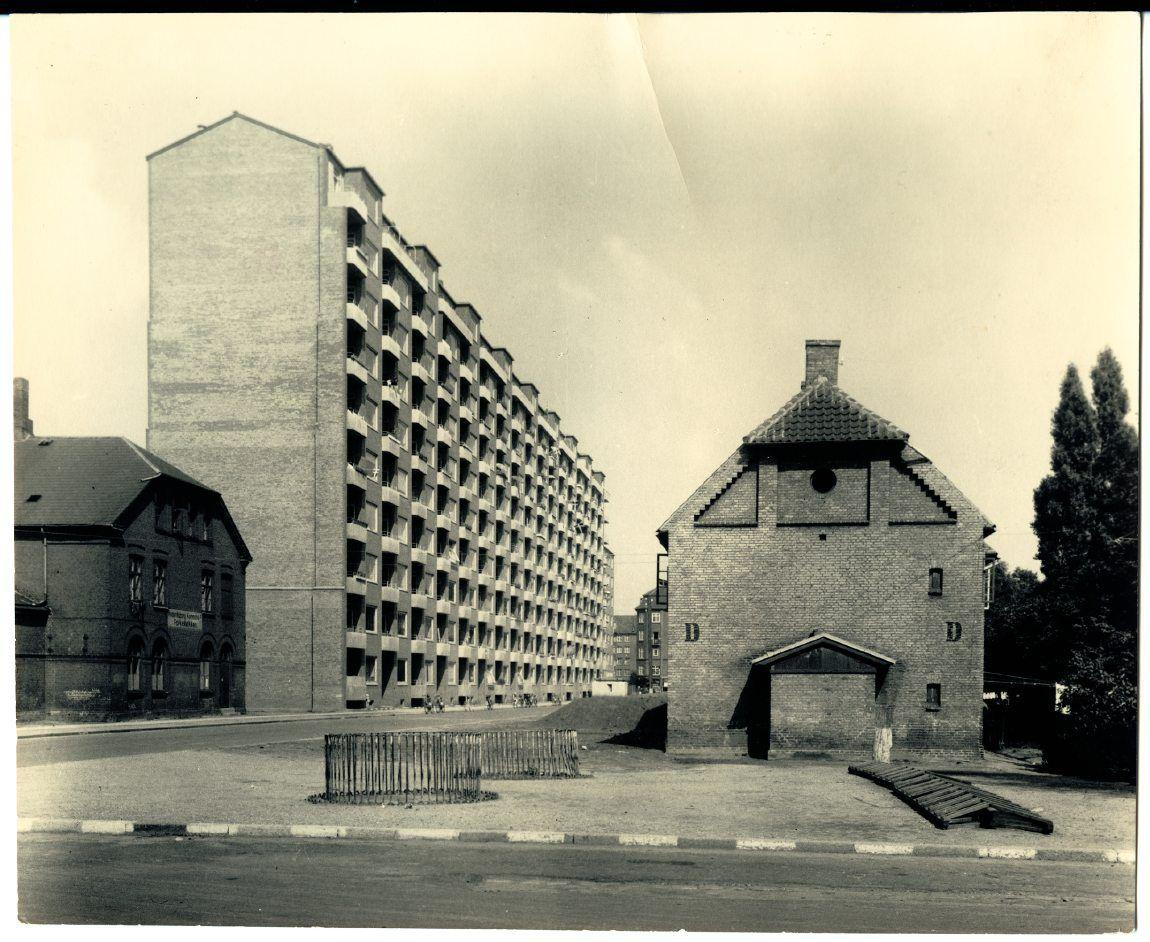
Godthåbs Have under construction, c. 1943

The Classen Terraces were formerly located at the site. They were built for indigent workers by the Classenske Fideicommis in 1866–1880. Frederiksberg Municipality bought the entire development in 1907 to demolish it, but a shortage of housing and a lack of funds and building materials during the two world wars delayed the plans.

The housing estate and associated greenspace was originally called Godthåbs Have. It was built in 1946 to a design by Sigurd Tanggaard. It received its new name, after former Frederiksberg mayor Aksel Møller, on 15 November 1965.

== Architecture ==
The housing estate is located at Aksel Møllers Have 2–32, Godthåbsvej 35–41 and Bjarkesvej 6. It is 7 to 10 stories tall and is built in red brick. It comprises 333 apartments and seven commercial tenancies.

== Public art ==
On the square, close to Godthåbsvej, stands an untitled granite sculpture by Søren Georg Jensen. It was created in 1972 and installed at the site in 1977.

== Transport ==
The metro station opened on 29 September 2019.

Movias bus lines 2A and 831 stop at Aksel Møllers Have on Godthåbsvej. The bicycle parking facility has room for 220 bicycles overground and 130 bicycles underground.
