= Niels Johannes Fjord =

Danish professor

Niels Fjord
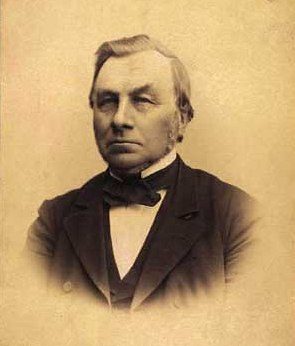
- Born: 27 April 1825; Holmsland, Denmark
- Died: 4 January 1891 (aged 65); Frederiksberg, Denmark
- Occupation: Agricultural pioneer
- Known for: Landøkonomisk Forsøgslaboratorium
- Awards: Commander of the Order of the Dannebrog, 1888

Niels Johannes Fjord (27 April 1825 – 4 January 1891), often referred to as N. J. Fjord, was a Danish Professor at the Royal Veterinary and Agricultural University. He was a pioneer in dairy and milk research in the mid-1800s. He was a driving force and the first leader of the Landøkonomisk Forsøgslaboratorium on Rolighedsvej in 1883.

== Education ==
Born into an agrarian family, he graduated from Lyngby college at the age of 18 years. His desire to join the military was futile as his father was against it. Eventually, he moved to Aarhus for his education, and happened to meet PP Freuchen and Edward Tesdorpf whose lives influenced him to take up higher education. Freuchen, then the principal, instilled an interest in natural sciences to Niels and later, he went on to take up a teaching position in physics and mathematics.

== Personal life ==
Fjord married Hansine Christine Magdalene Claudevitz (22 March 1830 - 12 March 1911(m a daughter of master saddlery Christian C. (c. 1795-1870) and Karen Marie Weile (ca. 1806-67), on 12 August 1859 in the Church of Our Lady in Copenhagen.

== Memorials ==
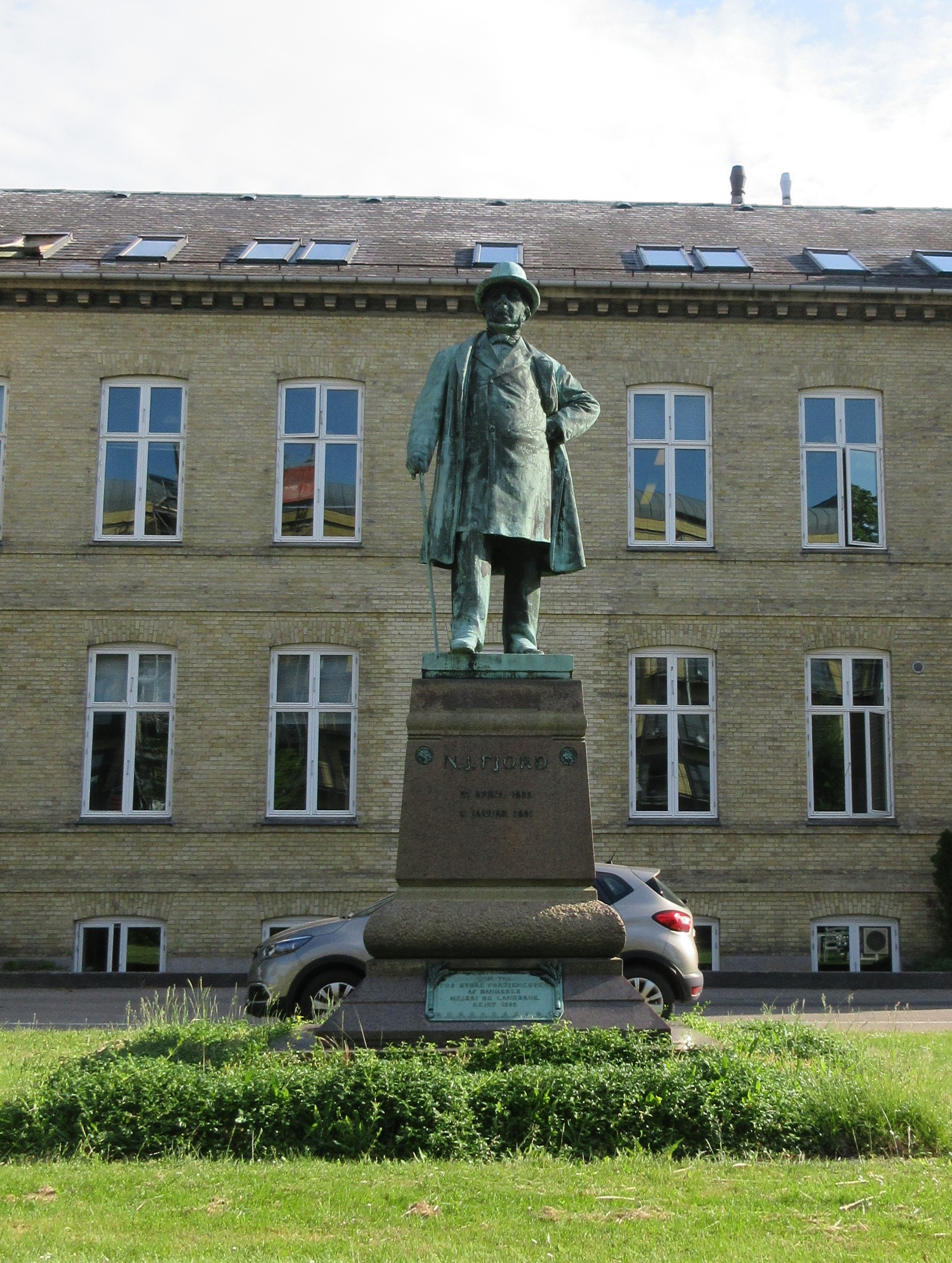
Statue of Niels Fjord

A bronze statue of Fjord was unveiled in front of Landøkonomisk Forsøgslaboratorium (Rolighedsvej 26) in 1903. It was created by Aksel Hansen. Hansen had also created a bust of Fjord in 1891 (Odense City Museum). An 1892 copy of the bust was created for the Royal Danish Society for Agriculture (Det Kongelige Danske Landhusholdningsselskab). Another copy has more recently been installed in the Danish Centre for Food and Agriculture in Foulum, Tjele, Denmark. A conference room there with his bust had been named after N.J. Fjord. NJ Fjordsgade skole (School) in Aarhus is named after Niels Johannes Fjord.

The streets N. J. Fjords Allé in Frederiksberg and N.J. Fjords Gade in Aarhus are named after Niels Fjord
