= Rolighed (Frederiksberg) =

Historic property in Copenhagen, Denmark

Radio House
- Radiohuset
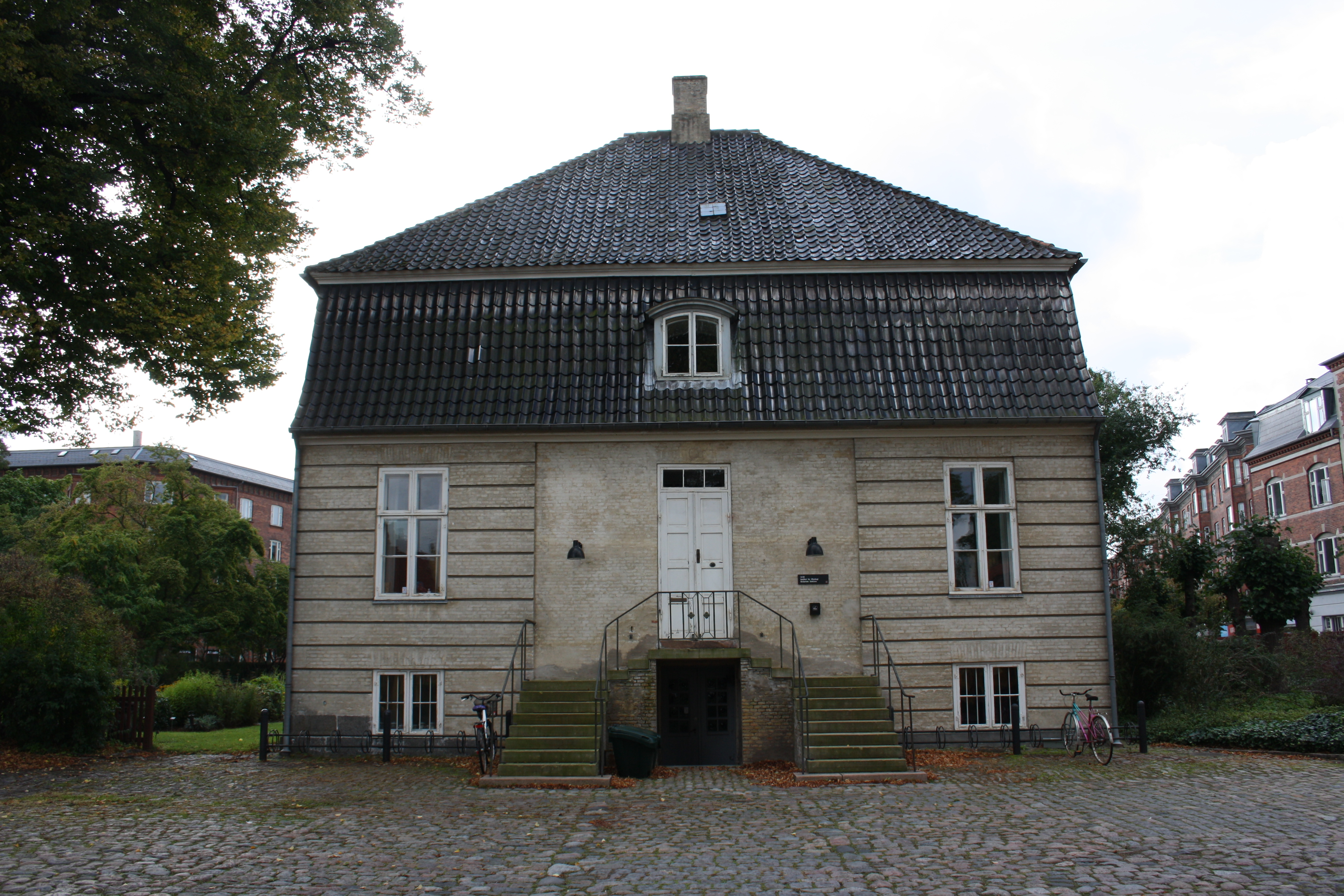
- Rolighed
- Interactive map of the Radio House area

General information
- Architectural style: Baroque
- Location: Copenhagen, Denmark, Denmark
- Coordinates: 55°41′07″N 12°32′37″E
- Completed: C. 1770
- Owner: University of Copenhagen

Rolighed is a historic property in the Frederiksberg district of Copenhagen, Denmark. Built in about 1770, it is one of few surviving examples of the summer retreats which dominated Frederiksberg from the late 18th century and until the area was absorbed by the expanding city of Copenhagen in the second half of the 19th century. It is now owned by University of Copenhagen.

== History ==
The property traces its roots back to 1742 when Finance Minister Nicolai Ahrentzen leased an area to the south of Ladegården to build a facility for bleaching of wax for candles which he supplied to the Royal Court. The complex consisted of a 27 bay half-timbered house, stables, a wagon house and a number of bleaching benches. In 1749, Lüder Stiefken took over the wax bleachery but when he went bankrupt eight years later it was sold at auction. The buyer was Judge Military Prosecutor General Andreas Bruun, who acquired additional land in the area, closed the bleachery and converted the property into a summer retreat with 18 cows and a garden with a fishing pond. He renamed the estate Mariendal, possibly after his daughter.

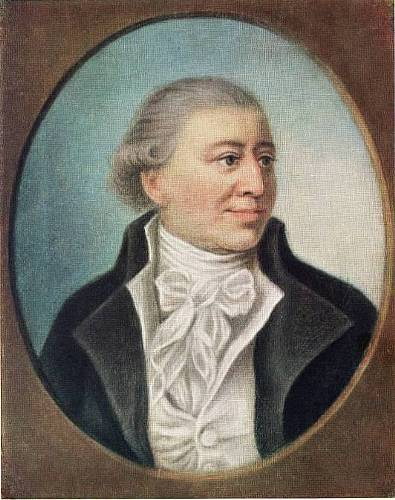
Conrad Alexander Fabritius-Tengnagel

After just a few years, the property changed hands again when it was purchased by Conrad Alexander Fabritius de Tengnagel, a prominent merchant and ship owner who also owned a town house in Christianshavn and Enrum at Vedbæk north of Copenhagen. Fabritius gave the property the name Rolighed and built the current house on his estate.

Fabritius owned Rolighed until 1785. Over the next several decades, the estate changed hands several times and continued to grow through new acquisitions until reaching all the way from Rolighedsvej to Gammel Kongevej in the south.

In 1855, Rolighed was purchased by the Ministry of Interior Affairs. The land was needed for the construction of the new Royal Veterinary and Agricultural University which opened in 1858 on Bülowsvej.

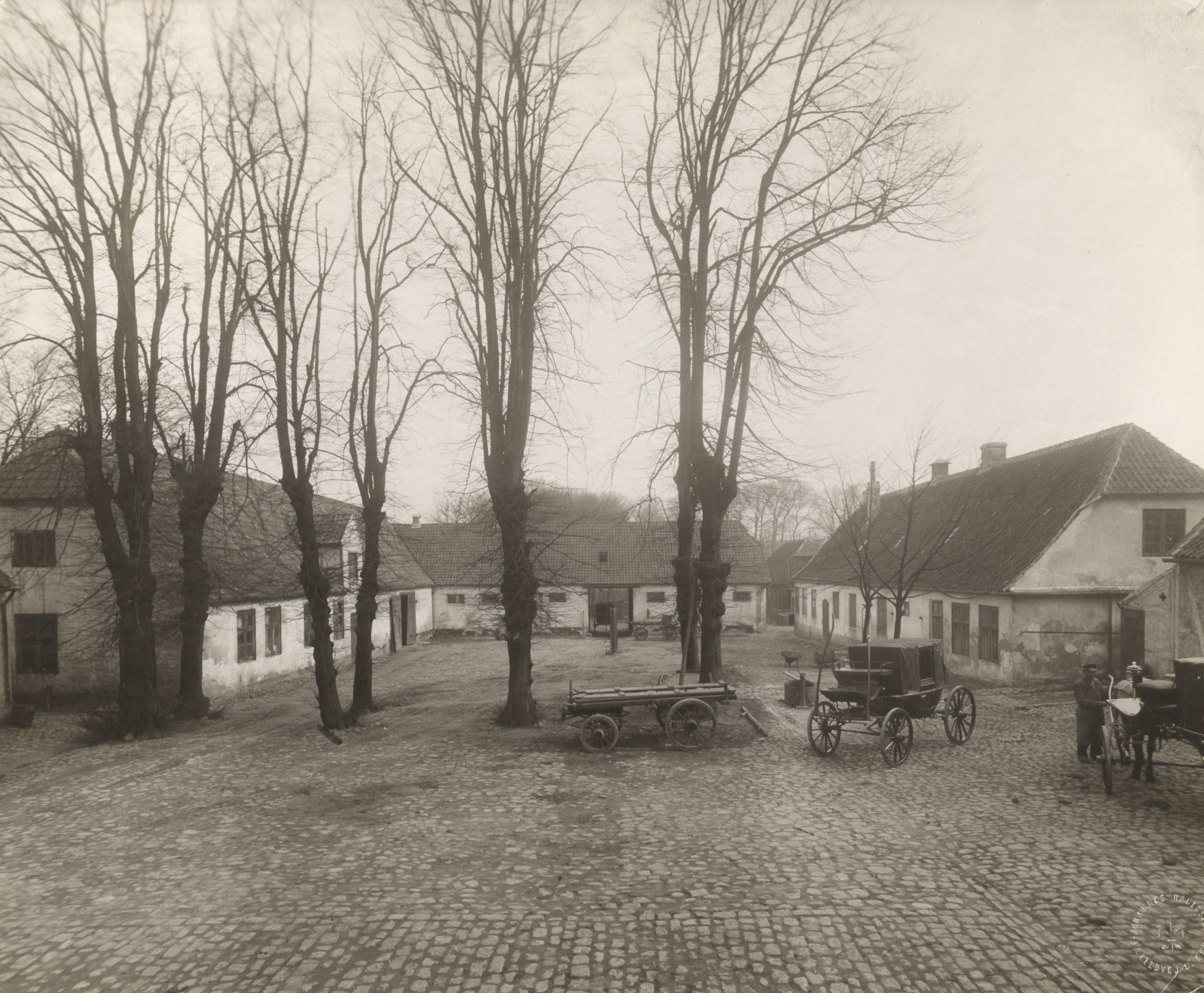
The adjacent farm buildings photographed by Johannes Hauerslev in the 1900s

The university sold off an area of land, where N.J. Fjords Allé, L.J. Brandes Allé and Dr. Abildgaards Allé later emerged, separating Rolighed from the rest of its grounds. The land where Rolighed was located, about 3.5 hectares, was sold to Københavns Sygehjem (literally "Copenhagen Sick Home"), which, after the 1853 Copenhagen cholera outbreak, was to provide a respectable alternative to the poorhouse for chronically ill members of the middle class. The new institution opened in 1859 and Rolighed was used as residence for the chief physician.

== Architecture ==
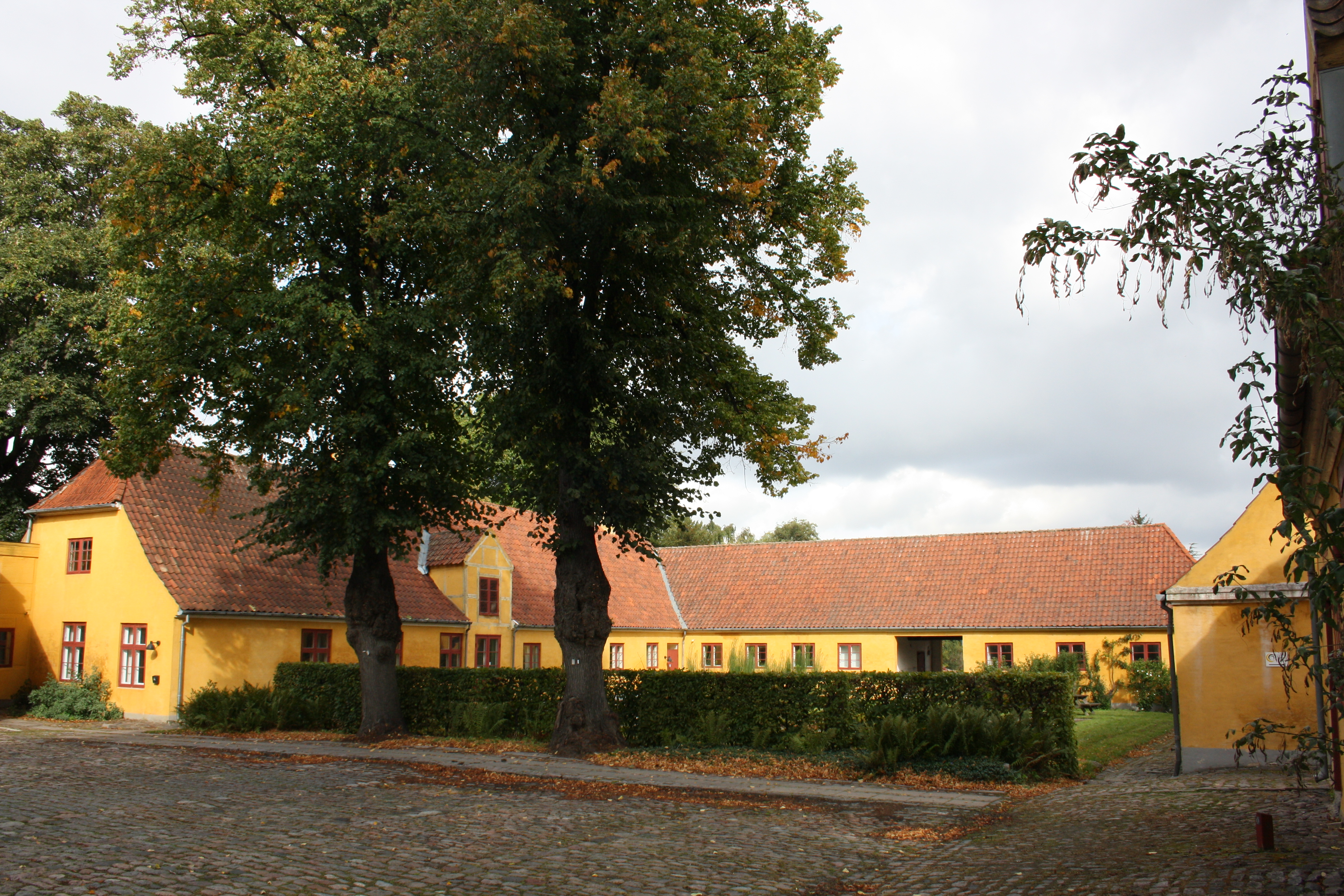
The adjacent farm buildings

Rolighed is designed in the Rococo style. It has an almost quadratic footprint and is topped by a Mansard roof with black-glazed tiles.

To the rear of the building is a cluster of low, yellow farm buildings located on three sides of a central courtyard.
