= Carl Lendorf =

Danish architect and historicist

Carl William Frederik Lendorf (13 December 1839 – 29 September 1918) was a Danish architect and historicist who worked primarily in Odense. He also designed Copenhagen's 1898 St Thomas' Church.

== Biography ==
He was born in 1839 in Copenhagen, the son of the carpenter Christian Gottfried Lendorf and Vilhelmine Nielsen. Lendorf became a student in 1855 at the Royal Danish Academy of Fine Arts Architecture School, where he went until 1863.

He was employed by Ferdinand Meldahl on the construction of Fredericia Town Hall (1859) and later worked on the reconstruction of Frederiksborg Palace (1863–64), also under Meldahl. Lendorf managed his own firm in Odense (1864–83) and then in Copenhagen. He was drawing teacher at Odense Technical College (1846–83). Lendorf participated in the Nordic Exhibition of 1888. He was honored as a Knight of the Dannebrog, was awarded the Dannebrogordenens Hæderstegn, and served on the board of the Foreningen for Alderdoms-Friboliger.

== Personal life ==
Lendorf was married on May 12, 1863 in Copenhagen to Sophie Christiane Jørgine Anchersen (3 October 1843, Vejle - 5 January 1901, Frederiksberg). He died in 1918 at Bagsvaerd and was buried at Solbjerg Park Cemetery.

== Selected works in Odense ==
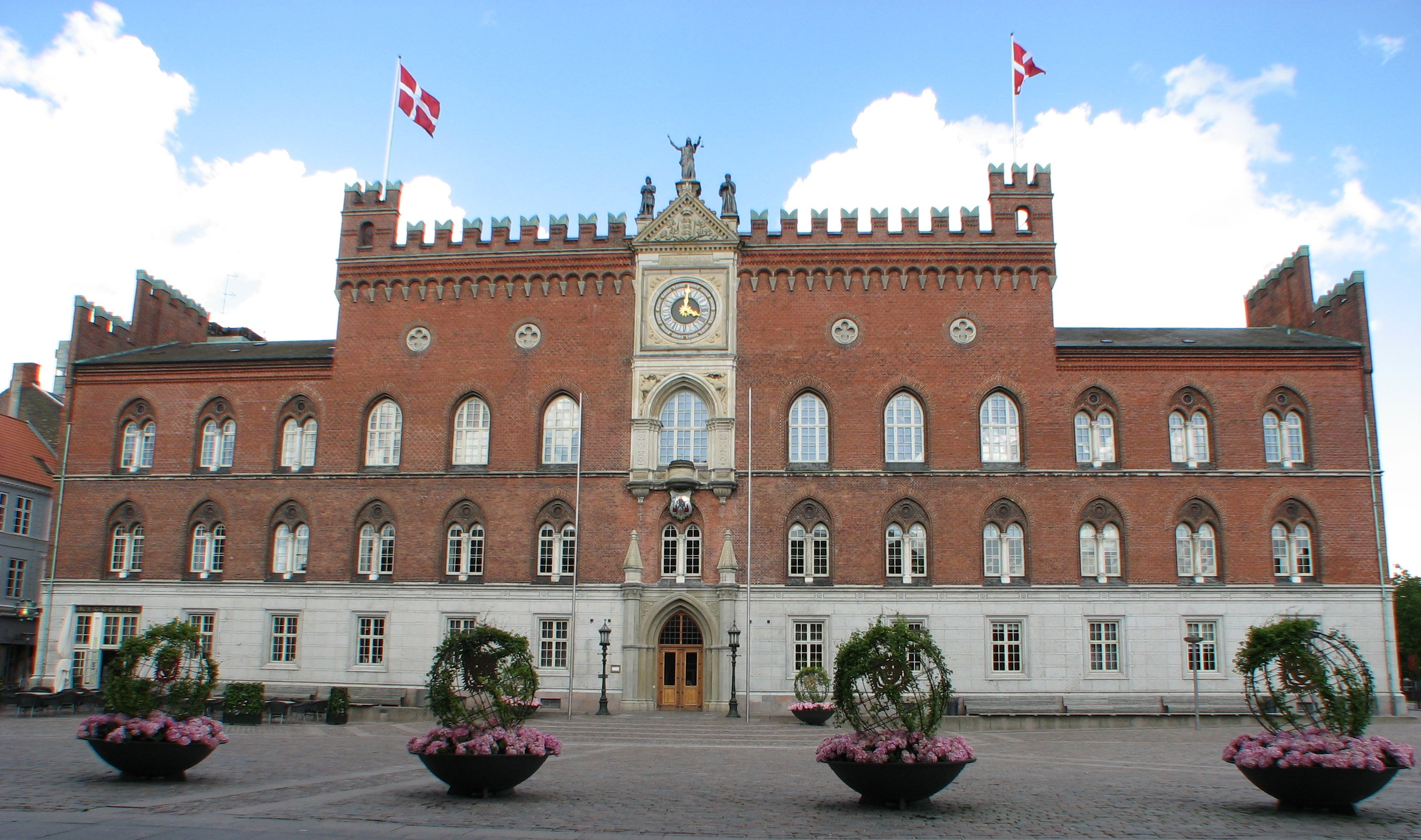
Odense Rådhus

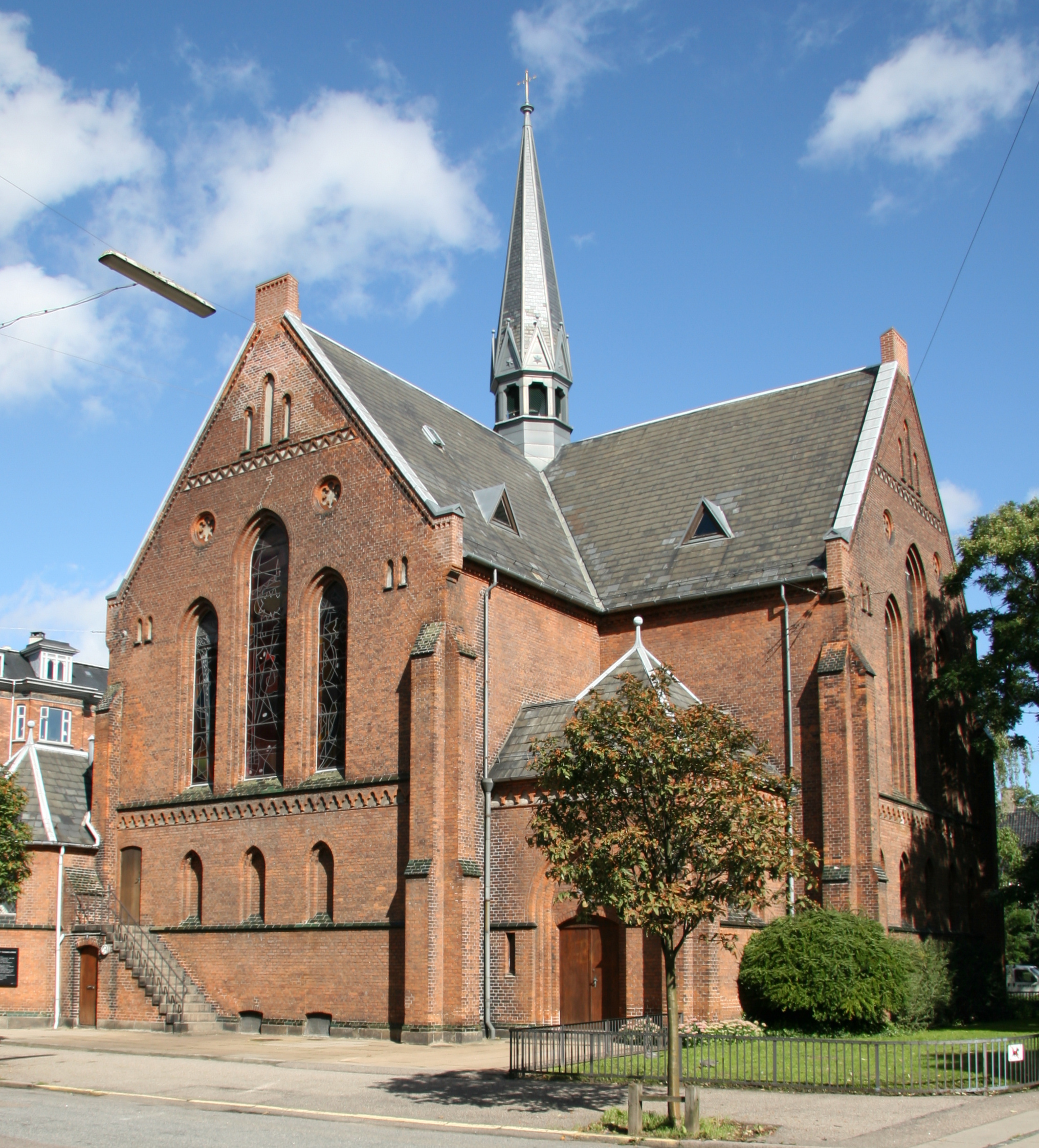
Skt. Thomas Church

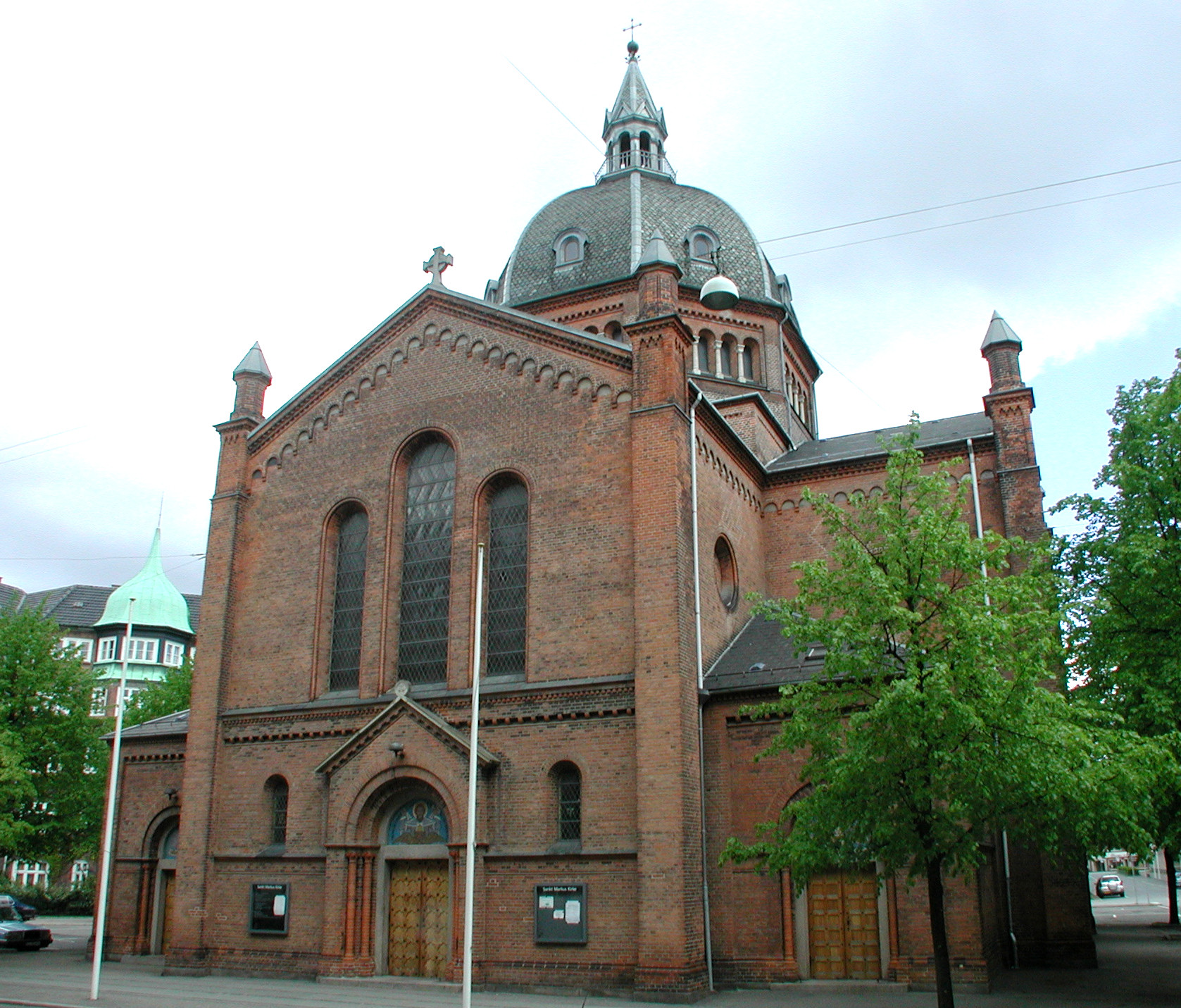
Skt. Markus Church

- Funen Stiftstidendes buildings near Lille Gråbrødrestræde (1866 sabotaged 1944)
- Torvehal Fisketorvet (1867, moved in 1875, later burned)
- The Danish Masonic Order lodge building, Albanigade 16 (1870)
- Sukkerkogeriet Odense, Vesterbro 118-120 (1872–73, now theater, etc..)
- Local girls' school, Klaregade (1873, demolished)
- Fyens Disconto Kasse (1873–74, demolished)
- Funen Diocese Savings Bank, later The hive, the Fish Market (1874–75)
- Rytterkasernen (barracks), Pjentendamsgade 21 (1874–80)
- Garrison Hospital, Albanigade (1876, demolished)
- Jernbanegades Skole, Jernbanegade 20 (1878–83, together with Johan Daniel Herholdt)
- Odense City Hall (1881–83, together with J.D. Herholt 1st prize, interiors comprehensively reworked)
