= St. Thomas' Church, Copenhagen =

Church building in Frederiksberg Municipality, Denmark

Coordinates: 55°41′03″N 12°32′30″E

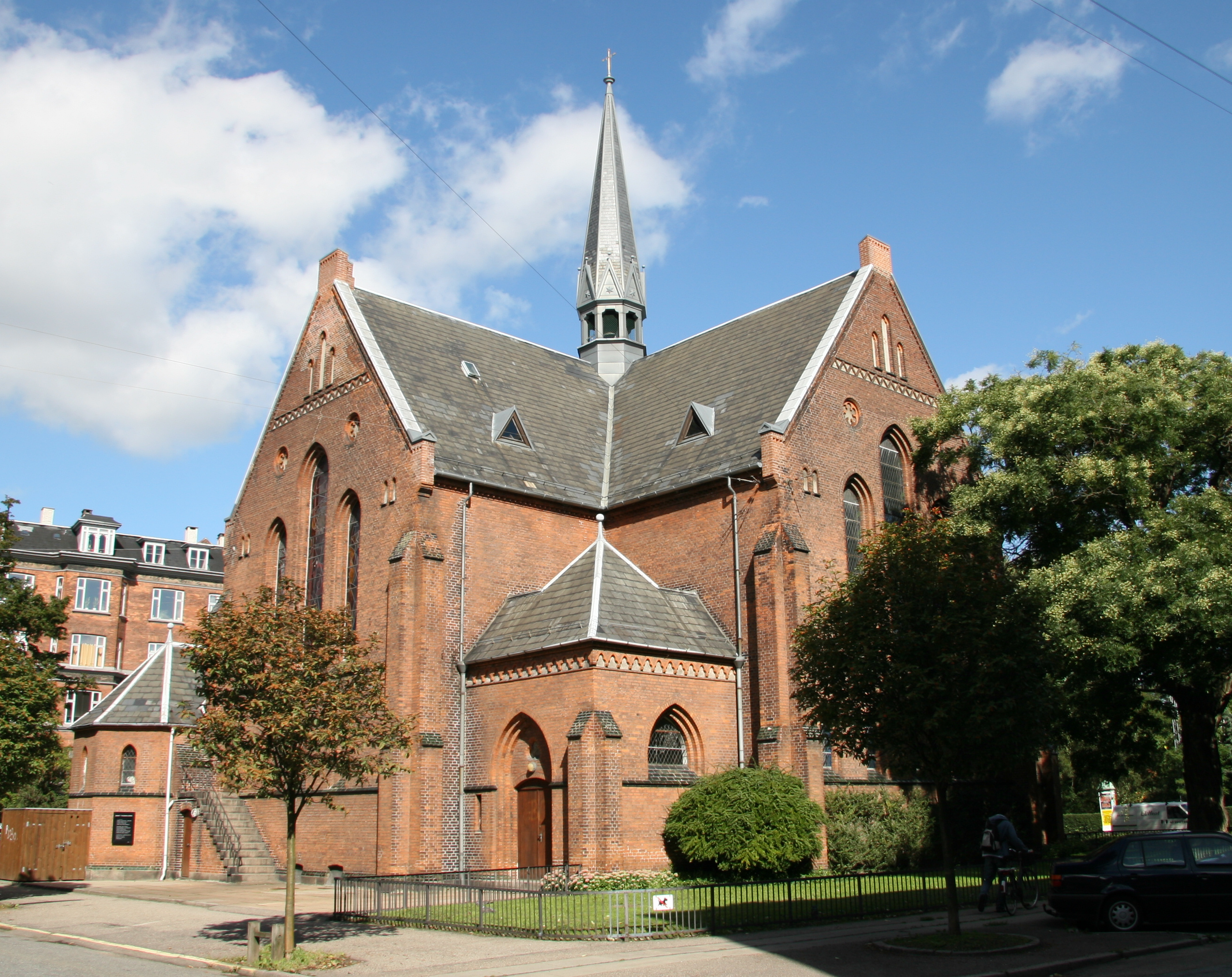
St Thomas Church

St Thomas Church (Sankt Thomas Kirke) is a church building of the Church of Denmark in the Frederiksberg district of Copenhagen, Denmark. It was designed by architect Carl Lendorf (1839-1918) and built in 1898.
