= List of DSB locomotives and multiple units =

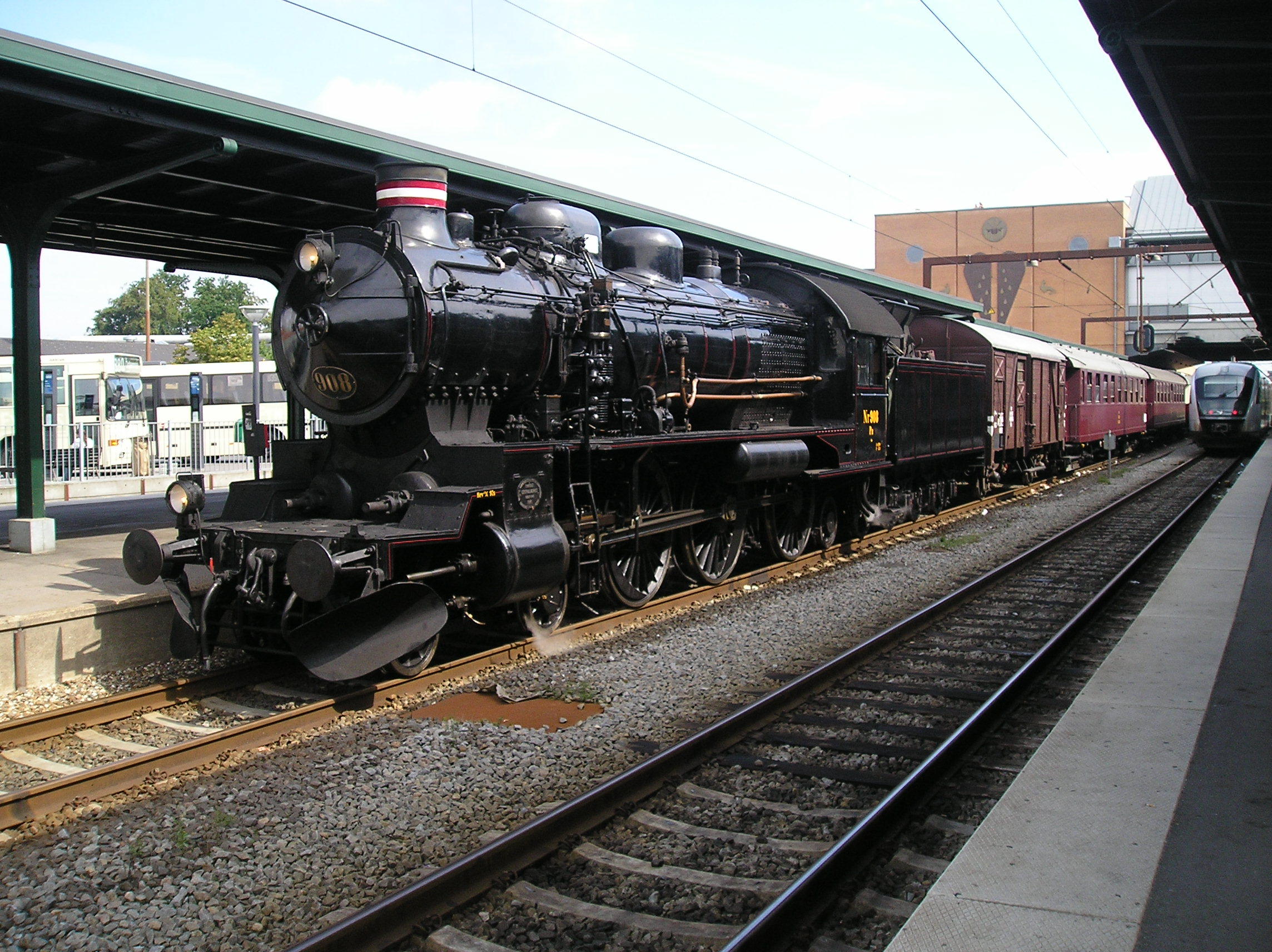
DSB PR 908 with restored train

This is a list of locomotives and multiple unit classes of the DSB, the primary train operator in Denmark. Steam locomotive classes were usually designated by a single capital letter, whereas diesel locomotives and Diesel Multiple Units (DMUs) are named with two (occasionally, three) letters, the first being an M for "motor"; electric locomotives and Electric Multiple Units (EMUs) are given two-letter combinations, the first being an E. The classes are referred to as "litra" (from Latin littera, "letter") in Danish, e.g. "litra MY" for the class MY locomotives. In addition to this class designation, each locomotive or multiple unit within a class has its own number.

The list is sorted chronologically by date of first delivery of a locomotive or multiple unit of the particular class. For classes no longer in regular service at DSB, the year of last retirement is listed. Some classes have been sold to Railion after DSB Gods was merged with it in 2001; in that case, year of retirement is put in parentheses. For each class, the wheel arrangement is given in UIC notation.

== Steam locomotives ==
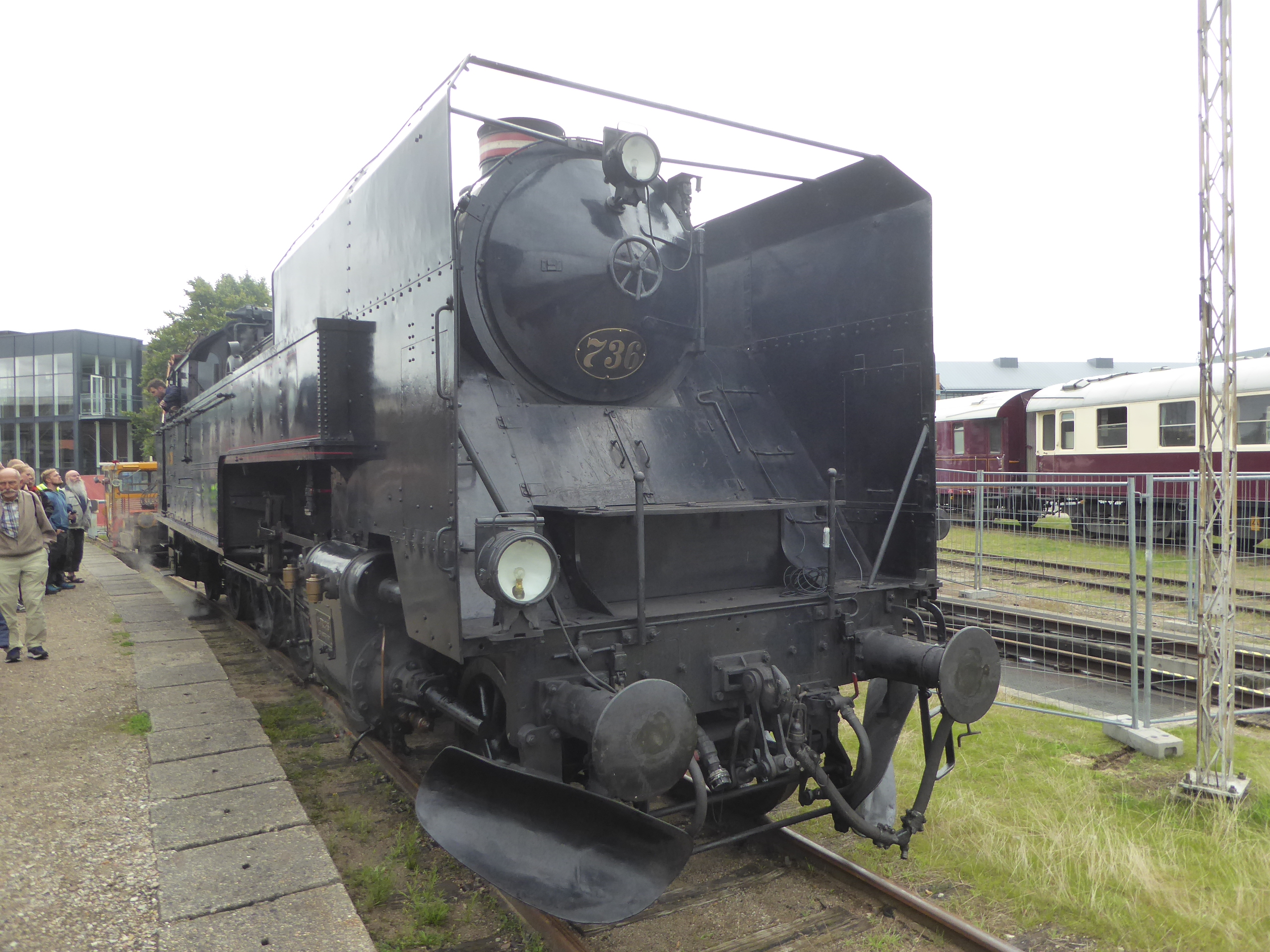
DSB S 736 at Jernbanemuseum

Name (litra)	Built	Retired	Wheel arr.	Notes
A 129-159	1882	1956	2'B	
B 21-26, 45-49	(1893)	1932	1'B	
G 77...651	1884	1968	C	Delivered in three series (Nos. 77-81, 101-106 and 160-173, 601-651, respectively)
K 501-600	1894	1974	2'B	
F 423...700	1898	1976	C	
D 801-900	1902	1974	1'C	
C 701-719	1903	1969	2'B	
P 901-933	1907	1962	2'B1'	
R 934-963	1912	1972	2'C	Delivered in two series (Nos. 934-953 and 954-963, respectively)
H 783-800	1923	1976	1'D	Delivered in two series (Nos. 789-800 and 783-788, respectively)
S 721-740	1924	1976	1'C2'	
Q 337-351	1930	1976	D	
E 964-999	(1937)	1976	2'C1'	Former Swedish class F
PR 901...930	1943	1964	2'C1'	Rebuilt from class P locomotives
T 297-299	(1948)	1967	2'C	Former German class P 8 (BR 38)
N 201-210	(1952)	1970	1'E	Former German BR 50/BR 52

== Diesel locomotives ==
Name (litra)	Built	Retired	Wheel arr.	Notes
MT 101-106	1927	1943	A1-1A	
MV 115-116	1929	1955	1AA2	
MW 117-118	1929	1938	A1-2A	
MX 131-132	1932	1958	2-D-2	
MY 1101-1159	1954	2001	A1A-A1A	6 locomotives with weaker prime mover renamed MV in 1968, some later renamed back to MY
MH 201–203	1957	1993?	C	
MY 1201-1202	1957	1969	A1A-A1A	Danish-built locomotives designed to compete with the Swedish-American built "MY class" locomotive
MT 151-167	1958	2000	Bo-Bo	
MH 301-420	1960	2002	C	
MX 1001-1045	1960	1993	A1A-A1A	
MZ 1401-1461	1967	(2001)	Co-Co	
ME 1501-1537	1981	2021	Co-Co	1501 is at the Danish Railway Museum (2015), 1502 (2016), 1507 (2016), 1510 (2007) are scrapped, 1509, 1513 and 1527 was sold to NRFAB in mid–2020. 1503 (2018), 1504 (2017), 1508 (2017), 1514 (2017), 1520 (2018), 1521 (2016), 1528 (2016), 1531 (2017), 1533 (2016), 1536 (2017), 1537 (2017) got DSB Red livery (The years in () is when they got the new livery)
MJ 506, 510	1993	1994	Bo	Returned to manufacturer as DSB was not satisfied with the locomotives.
MK 601-625	1996	(2001)	B	DSB still owns one MK (625), which is used for shunting at Belvedere.

== Electric locomotives ==
Name (litra)	Numbers	Built	Retired	Wheel arr.	Notes
EA	3001-3022	1984–1986, 1992	2020	Bo-Bo	DSB The last EA passenger-towed train was on 11 December 2020 Sjælland.
EG	3101-3112	1999–2000	-	Co-Co	All locomotives owned by DBCSC
EB	3201-3242	2020-	-	Bo-Bo	DSB has 42 Siemens Vectron locomotives on order, for domestic use and cross-border services to Germany.

== DMUs ==
Name (litra)	Numbers	Built	Retired	Wheel arr.	Notes
MA	601-603	1925	1942–1953	1A	Renamed from M 1-3 in 1928; renumbered 48-50 in 1934; renumbered 601-603 in 1941
MC	611-612	1926	1943–1947	1A1	Renumbered from 21-22 in 1941
ME	621-627	1927–1928	1932–1956	1A	Renamed from M 31-47 in 1928; renumbered 621-627 in 1941
MF	631-647	1928–1929	1938–1956	1A	Renumbered from 51-68 in 1941; 5 rebuilt to MC 651-655 in 1950
MR	531-534	1928	1956	2-AA	Renumbered from 201, 203, 204 and 206 in 1941
ML	501-515	1930	1934–1958	2-AA	Renumbered from 84-99 in 1941
MQ	521-524	1932	1957–1960	3-A1A	Renumbered from 207-210 in 1941
MP	540-549	1934	1962–1966	3-A1A	Renumbered from 251-260 in 1941
MO	563-572; 1951–1962; 1973–1999; 1801-1890	1935–1940; 1951–1958	1966–1984	2-B or 3-B	
MS	MS 401-406; AA 431-433	1935	1970–1973		
MB	MB 407-416; AB 434-438; FJ 446-450	1935–1938	1970–1973		
MK-FK	MK 675, 677, 679, 681, 683; FK 676, 678, 680, 682, 684	1943; 1951	1971	3-B0	
MBF	481-483, 484	(1949)	(1958)	1A-A1	
MDF	491-497	(1949)	(1957)	2-B-2	
MA (Sølvpilen)	MA 460-470; AM 500-509; BM 520-525; BR 530-535; BMK 530-535; BS 480-489	1963–1966	1995		MA 460-AM 500-BMK 530-BS 480 has been preserved at the Danish Railway Museum.
MR	MR 4001-4062; MR 4063-4299; MRD 4201-4299	1978–1979; 1983–1985; 1981–1985	2019	2-B	Retired or sold and handed over to Arriva.
ML	ML 4901-4907; FL 7901-7905	1984	2007	1A-A1	
MF (IC3)	MFA 5001-5096; FF 5401-5496; MFB 5201-5296	1989–1998	-		Sets 01-92 built for DSB, 93-96 are bought from Blekinge Länstrafik, and were built in 1991.
MQ (Desiro)	MQ 4111-4130; MQ 4911-4930	2002, 2010	2020		Sold and handed over to Arriva.
MG (IC4)	MG 5601-5683; FH 6601-6683; FG 6801-6883; MG 5801-5883	2003–2013	-		Set 09 is owned by Gadaffi and was never delivered to DSB
MP (IC2)	MP 5701-5723; FP 6701-6723	2004–2013	(2016)		The trains were delivered late, and a few has been sold to Romania.

== EMUs ==
Name (litra)	Numbers	Built	Retired	Wheel arr.	Notes
ER (IR4)	ER 2001–2044; FR 2201-2244; FR 2301-2344; ER 2101-2144	1993–1997	-		
ET (Øresundståg)	ET 4301-4411; FT 4701-4811; ET 4501-4611	2000–2012	-		111 total 34 trainsets are owned by DSB; 77 are owned by various Swedish operators
IC5	-	2025–2029	-		100 trainsets with option for 50 more ordered in April 2021

== S-trains ==
Name (litra)	Numbers	Built	Retired	Wheel arr.	Notes
First generation First delivery	MM 701-742; FM 861-881	1933	1966–1972		
First generation Second delivery	MM 743-762; FM 882-892; FS 901-922; FS 992-999	1935–1936	1967–1973		
First generation Third delivery	MM 763-778; FS 976-991	1949–1950	1969–1976		
First generation Fourth delivery	MM 779-802; FS 976-991	1952	1969–1978		
First generation Fifth delivery	MM 803-819; FS 935-951	1962	1972–1978		
Second generation First delivery	MM 7501-7507; FS 7001-7007	1967–1968	1999–2003		
Second generation Second delivery	MM 7601-7806; FS 7101-7306	1966–1975	1999–2007		
Second generation Third delivery	FU 8001-8065; MU 8501-8565	1975–1978	2001–2007		
Third generation First delivery	MC 6501-6508; FC 6001-6008	1979	1994		
Third generation Second delivery	MC 6509-6524; FC 6009-6024	1986	2006		
Fourth generation 8-car train	SA 8101-8205; SB 8301-8405; SC 8601-8705; SD 8801-8905; SD 9801-9905; SC 9601-9705; SB 9301-9405; SA 9101-9205	1995–2005	-		SA 8132 has had a new DSB livery applied in 2018.
Fourth generation 4-car train	SE 4101-4131; SF 4301-4331; SG 5401-4531; SH 4701-4731	2004–2005	-		
