= VSFT G 322 =

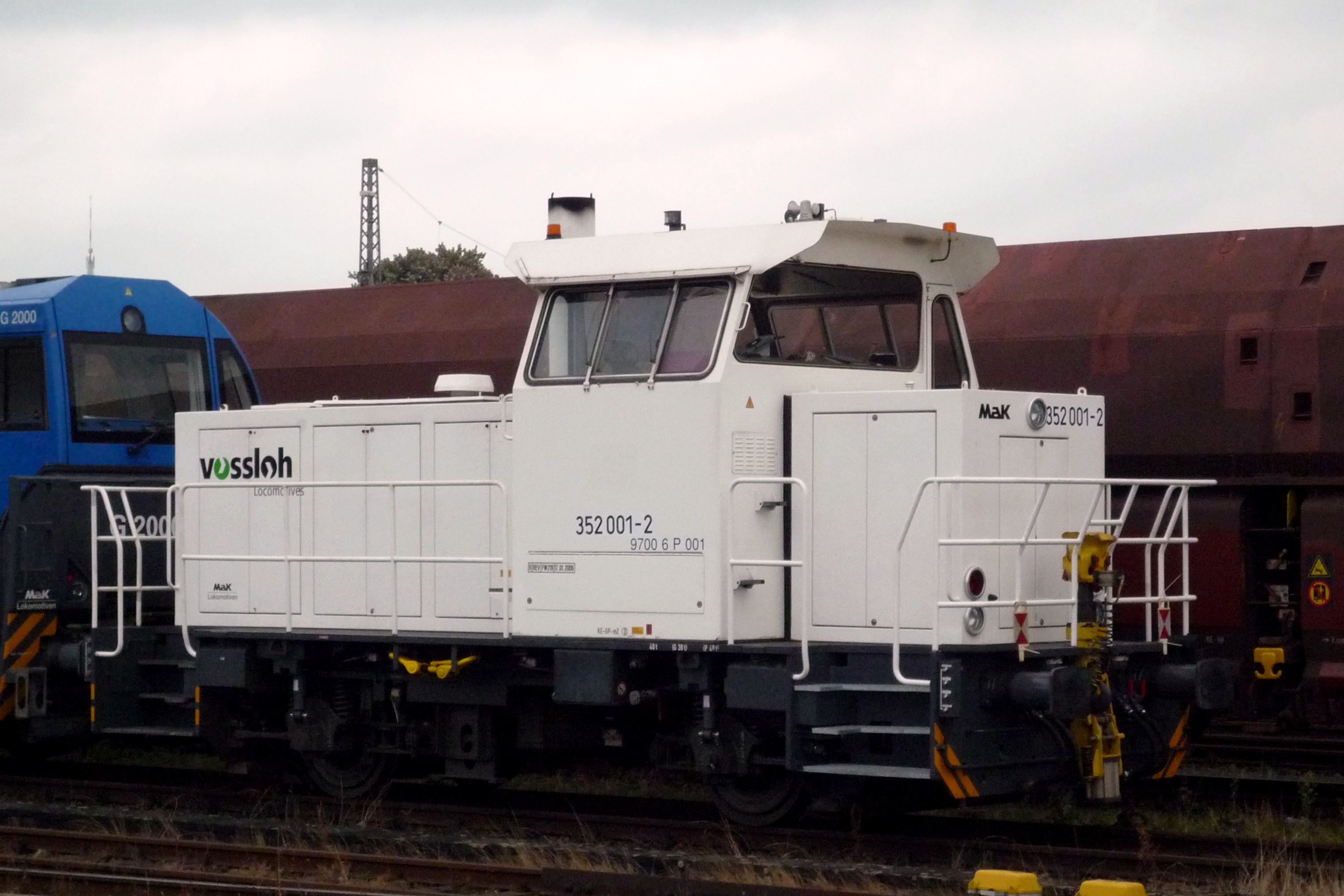
- Prototype G322 locomotive 352 001-2
Type and origin
- Power type: Diesel-hydraulic
- Builder: (Germany) Siemens Schienenfahrzeugtechnik / Vossloh, Kiel
- Build date: 1996–1998
- Total produced: 26
Specifications
- Configuration
  - UIC: B
- Gauge: 1,435 mm (4 ft 8 1/2 in)
- Wheel diameter: 1,000 mm (39.37 in) (new)
- Minimum curve: 50 m (164 ft 1 in)
- Length: 9.4 m (30 ft 10 in)
- Width: 3.1 m (10 ft 2 in)
- Height: 4.5 m (14 ft 9 in)
- Loco weight: 40 t (39 long tons; 44 short tons)
- Fuel capacity: 1,000 L (220 imp gal; 260 US gal)
- Sandbox cap.: 540 kg (1,190 lb)*
- RPM range: 2100 rpm
- Engine type: MTU 8V 183 TD13
- Transmission: Voith L2r4zseU2
- Safety systems: PZB 90*
Performance figures
- Maximum speed: 60 km/h (37 mph)
- Power output: 390 kW (520 hp)
- Tractive effort: 130 kN (29,000 lb_{f})*
Career
- Locale: Denmark, Germany
- Disposition: in service
- Prototype 352 001-2

The VSFT G322 is a B diesel-hydraulic shunting locomotive, initially built for and in service with the Danish State Railways (DSB) as Class MK.

== History ==
In 1989, DSB ordered 30 CMI 500 locomotives from Cockerill Mechanical Industries to replace its older Class MH and MT locomotives. Although delivery was originally planned for 1990, the first locomotive was not delivered until 1992. Due to high weight, technical problems, and changed requirements, DSB cancelled the order in 1994.

In 1995, Siemens Schienenfahrzeugtechnik was then contracted to build 20 G 322 locomotives as a replacement for the cancelled locos. A further 5 locomotives were ordered in 1997.

== Operations ==
Initially in use by freight division DSB goods, they were transferred in 2001 to Railion Denmark. The 3 oldest locos were sold back to Vossloh in 2003. Another namechange saw the remaining 21 locomotives transferred to DB Schenker Rail Danmark Services in February 2009. DSB still have one unit in service (625) in Copenhagen, used to shunt coaches in the yard called “Belvedere” and transport coaches to the workshop at Otto Busses Vej in Copenhagen.

A prototype locomotive, numbered 352 001-2 was built in 1996 and used for tests and leasing. It was sold to leasing company northrail in August 2008.

== See also ==
- Vossloh G 400 B, same type built after Vossloh's takeover.
