= S-train (Copenhagen) =

Local train network in Copenhagen

S-train S-tog

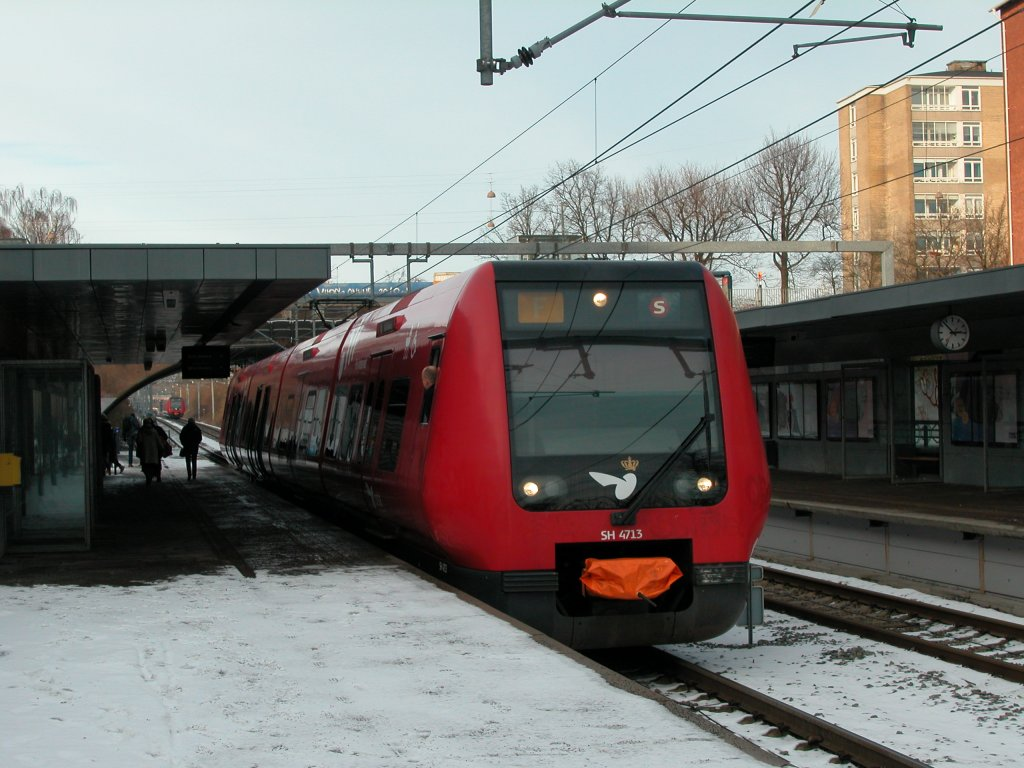
- An S-train with coupler cover on the F line at Ålholm station

Overview
- Locale: Copenhagen urban area
- Transit type: Commuter rail
- Number of lines: 7 with 7 services
- Number of stations: 87
- Annual ridership: 116 million (2016)

Operation
- Began operation: 1934
- Operator: DSB S-tog

Technical
- System length: 170 km
- Track gauge: 1,435 mm (4 ft 8 1/2 in) standard gauge
- Electrification: 1,650 V DC overhead lines
- Top speed: 120 km/h (75 mph)
System map
Current system map (includes Metro and local/regional trains), valid from December 2020

The Copenhagen S-train (Danish: S-tog) is a hybrid commuter rail and rapid transit system serving Copenhagen and the surrounding Øresund Region. The trains connect the Copenhagen inner city with Hillerød, Klampenborg, Frederikssund, Farum, Høje-Taastrup and Køge. There are 170 km (110 mi) of double track with 87 S-train stations, of which eight are in neighbouring towns outside Greater Copenhagen. It is part of the pan-European family of S-Bahn rapid transit networks, based on the concept originating in Germany, from which it takes its name.

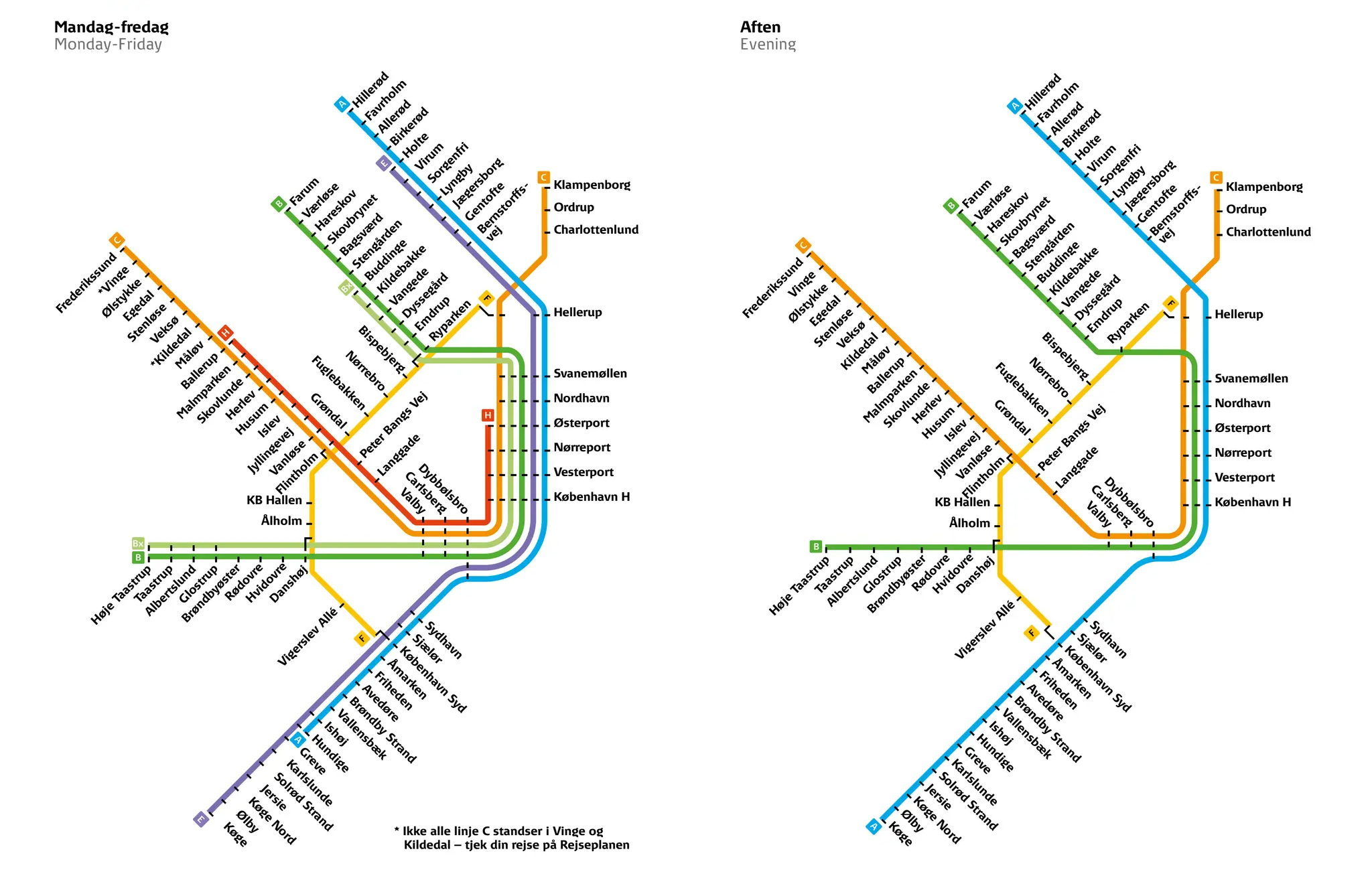

The S-train is run by DSB S-tog A/S while Banedanmark owns the tracks and signals. Rail services are operated by "Fourth Generation" S-trains divided into 104 8-car train sets (Class SA) and 31 4-car train sets (Class SE).

The system operates in tandem with the separately owned Copenhagen Metro which operates in the city centre, Frederiksberg and Amager. The two systems carry 700,000 passengers daily with S-tog serving more than 357,000 passengers a day.

S-train is complemented by regional trains, local diesel-powered trains within Metropolitan Copenhagen, an extensive bus network, a light rail line and two lines of shuttle boats called harbour buses. The city's bus terminals are often adjacent to an S-train or Metro station. The different networks use a common system for fare zones and tickets.

== History ==
The lines used by the Copenhagen S-Train suburban rail system in Denmark are six radial and two connecting rail lines, built during the late 19th and early 20th centuries as commuter transport to and from the residential areas around the city centre.

The S-line aimed to electrify the existing local rail network around Copenhagen. Preparations for the decision were made in the Electrification Commission of 1926, following several other approaches to plans. The Commission presented a report in 1929, in which it proposed that short-distance lines from Copenhagen to Klampenborg, as well as possibly Frederiksberg-Vanløse-Hellerup, should be electrified first – then the line to Holte, when the double track Holte-Hillerød was taken into use for the ordinary trains. After consideration of the proposal by DSB, the section to Valby was added as the first stage for electrification of the section to Ballerup, and a bill was submitted and adopted in April 1930.

The first section opened on 3 April 1934, and ran from Klampenborg to Hellerup and Vanløse to Frederiksberg. It was the first electrically powered railway in Denmark.

Stations were marked from the beginning with an "S" similar to those in the Berlin S-train system. There is a debate around the origin of the name "S-tog" ("S-train") with many citing that the name of the system came from a competition in the newspaper Politiken. The judges' panel cited a long list of possible explanations for the "S" in S-tog, including: "state railways" (statsbaner), "city railway" (stadsbane), "Greater Copenhagen" (Storkøbenhavn), "sun" (sol), "lake" (sø), "forest" (skov), "beach" (strand), "snow" (sne), "skiing" (ski), "skating" (skøjteløb), and "sleigh" (slæde), all of which start with an S in Danish. Larsen and Poulsen, however, challenge that this basis for the system name as an urban myth and that DSB had already determined the name. The names, though, demonstrate that the initial marketing of the S-trains emphasized recreational day trips from the city to the countryside.

Hellerup-to-Hillerød and Svanemøllen-to-Farum were existing lines reorganized into the new network, as was the line between Frederikssund and Valby. The section Valby – Vanløse opened in 1941, was extended to Ballerup in 1949, and then finally to Frederikssund in 1989. The system had single tracks between Ballerup and Veksø until 2000 and between Veksø and Frederikssund until 2002.

New tracks were established along the existing Valby – Høje Taastrup line between Valby – Glostrup, opening in 1953. It was extended to Taastrup in 1963, and then in 1986 to its final destination at Høje Taastrup.

A completely new line, the Køge Bay line, was built between Dybbølsbro and Køge in four stages: Dybbølsbro to Vallensbæk opened in 1972; Vallensbæk to Hundige in 1976; Hundige to Solrød Strand in 1979; and then finally to Køge in 1983.

The Frederiksberg – Vanløse – Grøndal line was closed with the arrival of the Copenhagen metro. The former Godsbaneringen Grøndal – Ny Ellebjerg route has been converted to an S-line.

Originally no letters or numbers were used for the individual lines, but with the introduction of the summer timetable on 14 May 1950, the system moved to line letters.

The S-train system has been entirely one-person operated since 1978.

== Network ==
The network consists of a central section through downtown Copenhagen that splits into three radial lines at each end, reaching the outer suburbs and neighbouring towns. The radial sections are connected to each other via that central section. The system is designed so that a train from any southern radial can continue along any of the three northern and vice versa. In the city centre, the trains run underground in two tunnel sections which are also served by regional trains. Elsewhere the tracks are in the open, occasionally above or below street level.

The three northern radials are:

- Farumbanen (formerly Hareskovbanen) (the Farum line) to Farum. (B & Bx lines)
- Nordbanen (the north line) to Holte and Hillerød. (A & E lines)
- The Klampenborg line to Klampenborg. (C line)

The three southern radials are:

- Køge Bay Line to Hundige, Solrød Strand and Køge. (A & E lines)
- Vestbanen (the west line) to Høje Taastrup. (B & Bx lines)
- Frederikssund line to Ballerup and Frederikssund (C & H lines)

The six radials are additionally connected by

- Ringbanen (the Ring or F line) going between Hellerup in the north and København Syd in the south. The Ring line is connected to the Nordbanen (north line) and Klampenborg Line at Hellerup, but it is normally only used in connection with the Klampenborg line. The Ring line has an elevated section including Nørrebro station, which offers a view of some of the most populous areas of the city, Nørrebro and Nordvest. The junctions of the Farumbane with the other lines at Ryparken and Svanemøllen include a short elevated section and a short northbound tunnel, respectively.

The average distance between stations is 2.0 km, shorter in the city core and inner boroughs, longer at the end of lines that serve suburbs.

=== Former projects ===
- Lundtoftebanen

== Lines ==
Since December 2020, there have been seven lines running across the network. A, B, C and F run all week, E and H Monday to Friday, and Bx is a support line that operates only during the rush hour.

All stations are served at least every 10 minutes until the evening. Train departures occur approximately every two minutes at the stations on the city core route; all lines except the F (Ring) Line use the same path. On most suburban lines the trains depart every five minutes. On Sundays these time intervals are doubled.

Line	Route	Freq (mins)	Comments
A (S-train)	Hundige – Copenhagen H – Hillerød	10	Every evening and night after 20:00 ( 8:00 PM ), evening and night time schedules. And line A in all weekends schedules.
B (S-train)	Høje Taastrup – Copenhagen H – Farum	10	Every evening and night after 20:00 ( 8:00 PM ), evening and night time schedules. And line B in all weekends schedules.
Bx (S-train)	Høje Taastrup – Copenhagen H – Buddinge	(20)	Only during rush hour
C (S-train)	Frederikssund – Copenhagen H – Klampenborg	10	Every evening and night after 20:00 ( 8:00 PM ), evening and night time schedules. And line C in all weekends schedules.
E (S-train)	Køge – Copenhagen H – Holte	10	Monday-Friday only
F (S-train)	København Syd – Flintholm – Hellerup	5	Sometimes to Klampenborg, Only doing engineering work, rail replacement and track maintenance for line C.
H (S-train)	Ballerup – Copenhagen H – Østerport	20	Monday-Friday only
M (S-train)	København Syd - Flintholm - Hellerup - Holte - Hillerød		As a temporary line, Only doing engineering work, rail replacement and track maintenance. Temporary line: Line M is a special S-train line that DSB only deploys in connection with major track work or technical changes to the network.

Originally, no letters or numbers were used for the individual lines, but the timetables from 14 May 1950 for the Klampenborg, Holte and Frederiksberg lines were designated as sections 1a, 1b and 1c. Those lines became A, B and F respectively while simultaneously a new line C was created.

In 1963, a subordinate x (for extra) was introduced to rush hour lines with line Bx as the first. From 1979 to 1989, some lines which only ran during daytime on weekdays daytime, were characterized by doubling the line letter, Bb and Cc. From 1989 to 1993, they got ordinary line letters. Then, they switched to a system with a subordinate "+", A +, B +, E +, F + and H +. This system was dropped in 2007 with the introduction of 10-minute operation on the key daytime lines.

== Stations ==
Of the 86 stations, 32 are located within the central ticket fare zones 1 and 2. Another 35 stations are located within the Copenhagen Urban area. Therefore, just 17 stations can be said to be located in suburbs.

Forty-six stations are elevated, twenty-one are street level, fifteen are below street, 4 have different levels and one is underground. Within the city core (zones 1 & 2) the stations are either elevated or lower than the street level.

Most stations consist of two tracks, each with its own side platform or an upper platform in between. At terminals and hubs, however, there may be several tracks and platforms depending on local conditions. Older stations are often designed with a station building where there used to be ticket sales, but after the 1970s gradually moved to unstaffed stations with ticket machines, the design of new stations has typically become simpler. There are still kiosks with the possibility of buying tickets at some stations, but in a number of cases the old ticket sales outlets have been re-purposed, or the buildings have been demolished.

At most of the termini other types of train are available for travel to the more remote towns in the metropolitan area (L-tog, diesel-powered local trains) or to the rest of Zealand and the other islands between the Great Belt and Øresund (regionaltog, regional trains). Trains across Øresund to Scania and its main city, Malmö, connect with the S-train network in the city centre.

== Facilities ==
Free Wi-Fi Internet access was available in the S-train system. The service was discontinued on January 1st, 2020 due to insufficient customer demand.

== Ticketing ==
The S-tog along with buses, regional trains, and Copenhagen metro uses Rejsekort, an electronic ticketing system across Denmark. Passengers can also buy paper single-trip tickets at ticket vending machines with cash or credit cards or at 7-Eleven kiosks at the train and metro stations or with the "DOT Tickets" iOS or Android app. The city is divided into travel zones, and the price of a journey depends on how many journeys are travelled through (minimum 2 zones). The price is the same no matter if you take a bus, train or S-Train, and a 20% discount is applied when traveling outside of peak times if using Rejsekort.

Both the City Pass and Copenhagen Card aimed at tourists are accepted on the system.

== Future ==
Since 30 trains per hour per direction now run between Dybbølsbro and Svanemøllen, the construction of a new tunnel, running north–south in densely populated areas, has been discussed.

Proposals to extend the Vestbanen (West) line from Høje Taastrup to Roskilde along existing tracks, have been discussed on several occasions, and was under investigation as of 2019.

Extension from Klampenborg to Elsinore (converting the Kystbane railway to S-train standard) would prove more difficult, but the issue has been mentioned. The major problem is a lack of spare capacity in the central tunnel.

Connecting Copenhagen Airport, Kastrup, to the network has been proposed, although it is already served by both regional trains and the Copenhagen Metro.

The Danish Transport Authority (Trafikstyrelsen) has suggested converting the F-line of the S-train network to metro standard as an M5 line, The only current interchange between the F line and the metro network are Flintholm Station and Nørrebro Station.

The F line is planned to be driverless and to run 24/7 in 2024/2026.

== Technical overview ==
S-trains run on standard-gauge tracks and are powered via overhead wires. The voltage between 1,500 and 1,650 volts DC (negative overhead wire), as it varies considerably with the load and distance from feeder stations. Power is drawn from the national grid through 38 feeder stations. They have to be relatively close to each other because the large currents in the overhead wires (caused by the relatively low voltage) would lead to unacceptably large transmission losses otherwise.

From 1975 until 2022, the primary signalling system was a proprietary fixed-block cab signalling system called HKT that transmitted data to the trains via low-bandwidth audio frequency induction loops between the rails. Varying the combination of frequencies allowed up to 15 different instructions or commands – such as stops and permitted speeds – to be indicated to the train. Use of the permitted speed encoding provided full supervision of train speed; when a train running under HKT control entered a block with a lower target speed than the train's current speed it would initiate service braking until the two speeds matched. This, combined with the fact that all S-train stock had similar braking characteristics, allowed the assumption of reduced braking distances and the use of fixed blocks significantly shorter than on conventionally-signalled railways.

Lineside signals were provided for use when the HKT system was inoperative or when a non-equipped train needed to be driven on the line, but line capacity was significantly reduced as these signals only protected full-length blocks and had to be placed according to conservative braking distance assumptions.

In 2011, infrastructure operator Banedanmark awarded Siemens Mobility a contract to replace HKT with its Trainguard MT communications-based train control system (CBTC), on the grounds that the HKT installation was reaching the end of its life and becoming increasingly unreliable. The CBTC system employs the moving block principle, whereby a central controller continuously tracks the precise location and speed of every train on the line and adjusts the instructions issued to drivers accordingly. On the S-train network this has allowed a reduction in minimum separation between consecutive trains (headway) from 120 seconds to only 90.

Hillerød–Jægersborg was the first section to be converted, as its F-HKT installation ("simplified" HKT) had the oldest hardware and did not deliver the same level of train protection as the other parts of the system. The new CBTC system entered service on this section on 29 February 2016. Further conversions continued through to 2022, when in late September the final three routes (Valby–Frederikssund, Valby–Høje Taastrup, and Sydhavn–Køge) were switched over to CBTC operation.

In April 2024. DSB and Banedanmark awarded a €270 million contract to Siemens Mobility, to equip the network for GoA4 unattended operations.

== Rolling stock ==
The S-train has seen four types of rolling stock. Currently, only fourth-generation trains operate, after the retirement of the second and third generation trains in 2007 and 2006 respectively.

=== First generation (1934–1978) ===
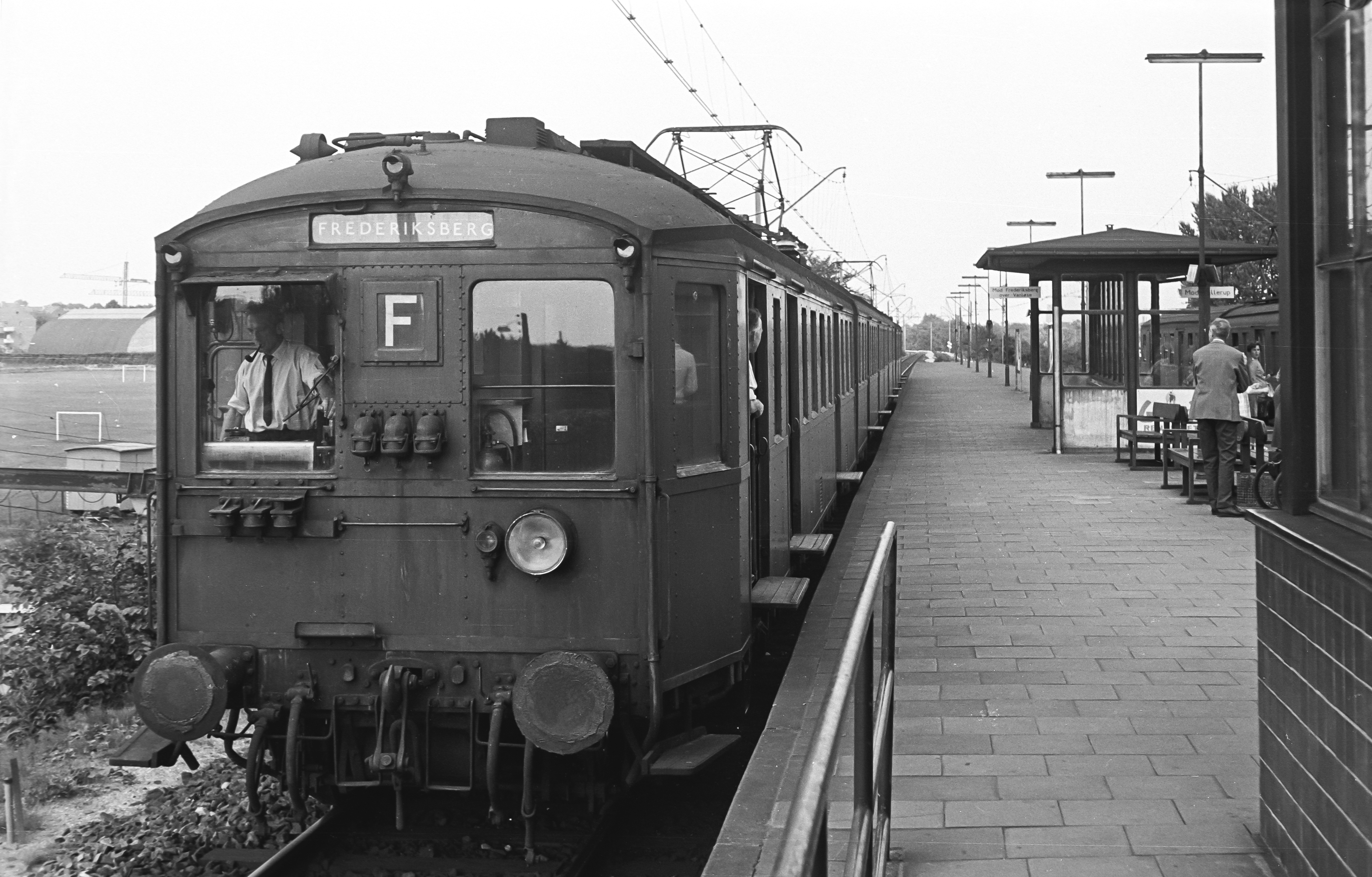
1st generation S-train, August 1969

The first generation (DSB class MM-FM-MM) was introduced in 1934 at the opening of the network, and consisted of three carriages per train set (2 motor cars and 1 trailer car), manufactured from 1934 to 1962. Frichs A/S supplied the electric components while Scandia (now Bombardier Transportation Denmark) supplied the car bodies and non-electric components. They were retired in 1978, and one was used as a heritage train until 2003, when DSB decided to discontinue its use. They are the longest serving S-train rolling stock to date, in continuous service for 44 years.

=== Second generation (1967–2007) ===
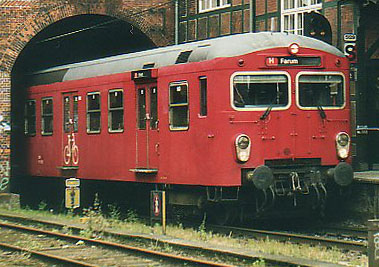
2nd generation S-train, August 2001

The second generation (DSB class MM-FU-MU-FS) was built from 1967 to 1978 by Frichs A/S (motored cars) and Scandia (trailer cars). They saw the introduction of the signature red colour that was to characterize subsequent generations of rolling stock.

There have been three different formations: the first (2-car), had a motor car with first-class seating (could be converted to second class) and a second-class trailer; the second (2-car), had second-class seating only; and the third (4-car), a motor car with driver's cab, a trailer, a motored trailer and a driving trailer without motor.

They ran until 7 January 2007. All have been scrapped except for a few set aside for museum use. An official ceremony was held on 3 February 2007 with the last trip. One train is set to be restored by DJK (Danish Railroad Club), who are now the owners of the train, so it can eventually make its way back to the tracks on special occasions such as anniversaries.

=== Third generation (1986–2006) ===
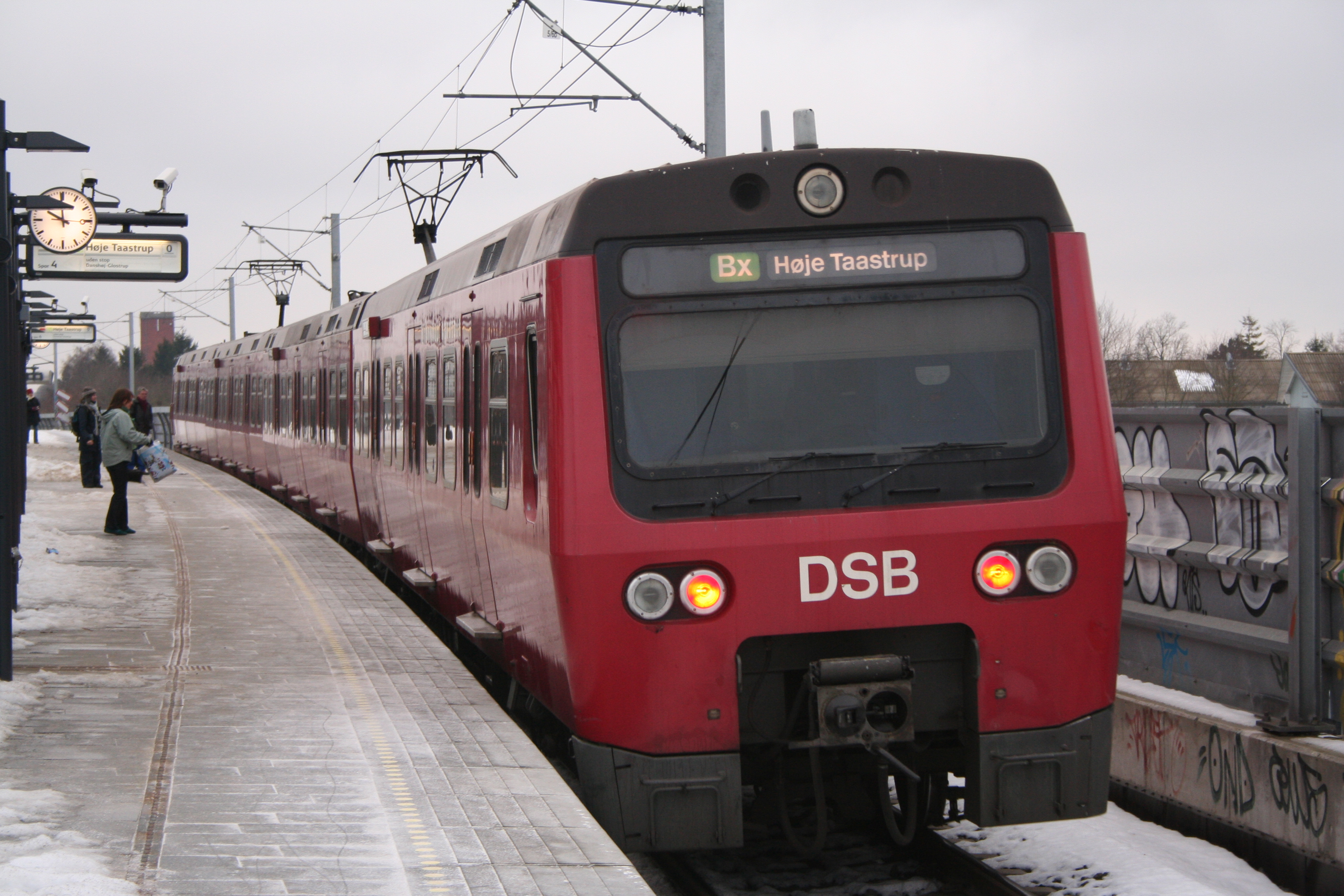
3rd-generation S-train, 2006

The third generation (DSB class FC-MC-MC-FC) were built by the Swedish industrial firm ASEA from 1979 to 1986. Despite possessing a much improved level of passenger comfort as compared to the previous two generations of rolling stock, it suffered a much higher rate of mechanical failure as compared to its predecessors. Twelve trains in 4-car formation (48 cars) were built (a further 32 4-car trains were not realised), and it first entered service in 1986 on the Vestbane and the Nordbane (B service) between Holte and Høje Taastrup. They were the first S-train rolling stock to feature electronic chopper control.

In 1995, 4 trains (16 cars) were scrapped and the remaining 8 trains (32 cars) were refurbished and reassigned to the Ringbanen (F service), where they remained in service until an incident where a child was trapped between the doors forced their early retirement in June 2006. When attempts to sell them failed, they were transported to Holbæk harbour on 23 August 2007 in order to be scrapped.

=== Fourth generation (1996–present) ===
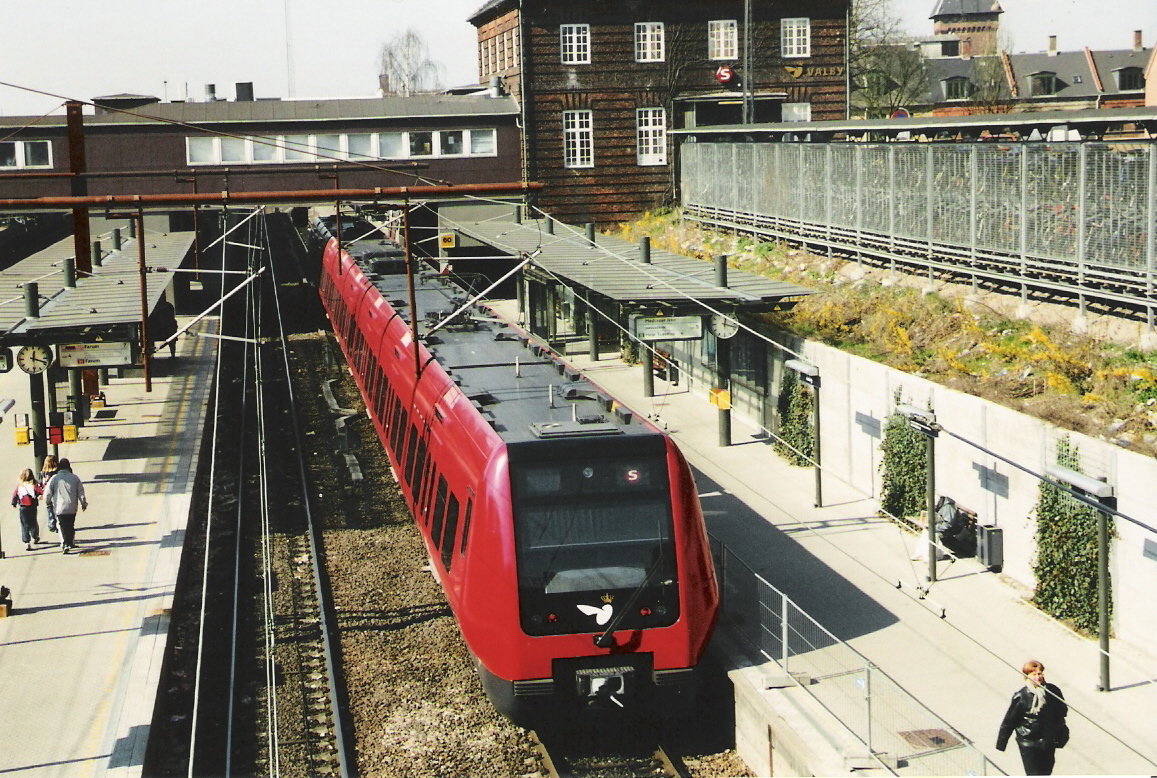
Valby station with an 8-car 4th-generation S-train, April 2002

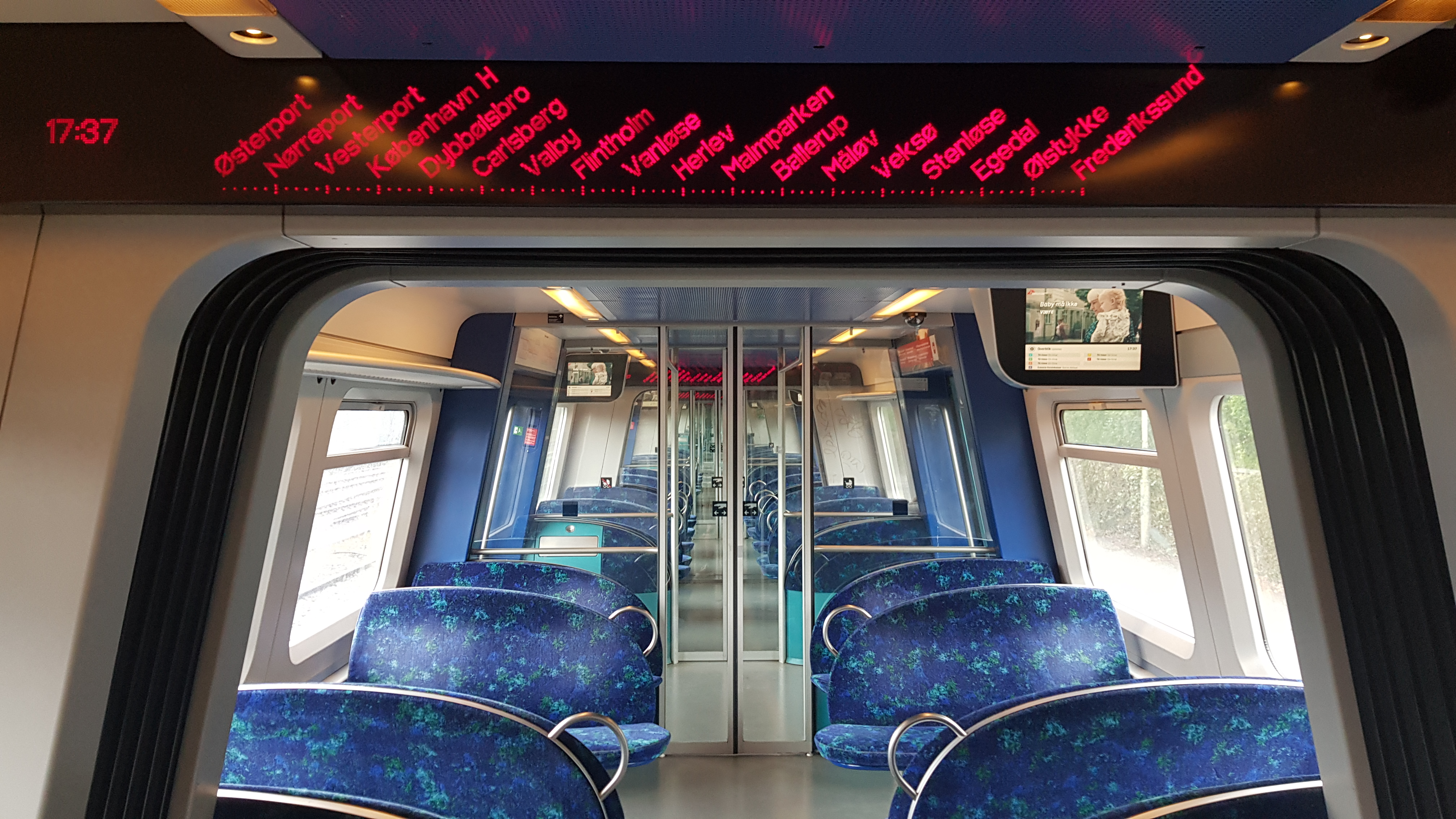
Interior of a fourth generation S-Train (H line to Frederikssund)

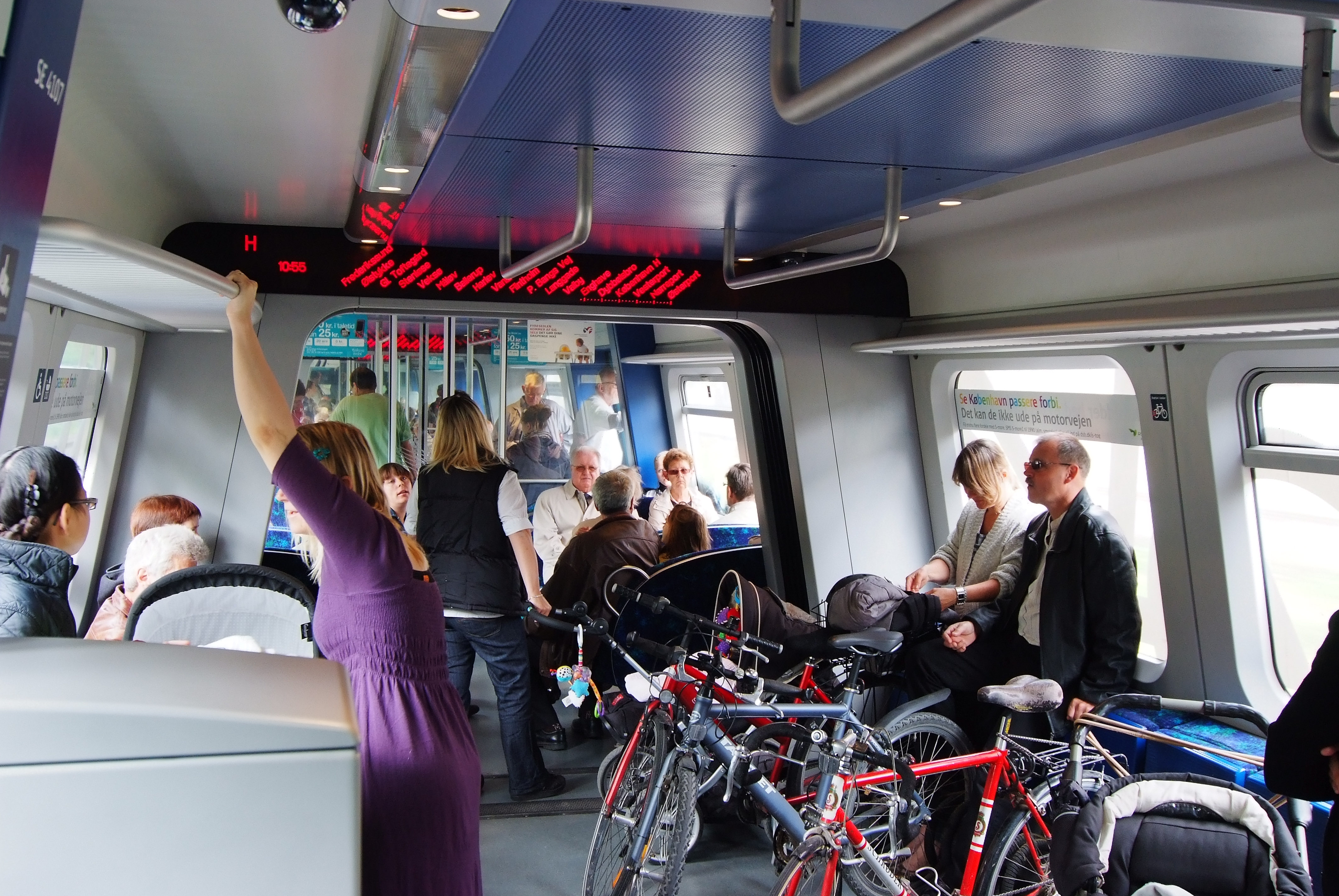

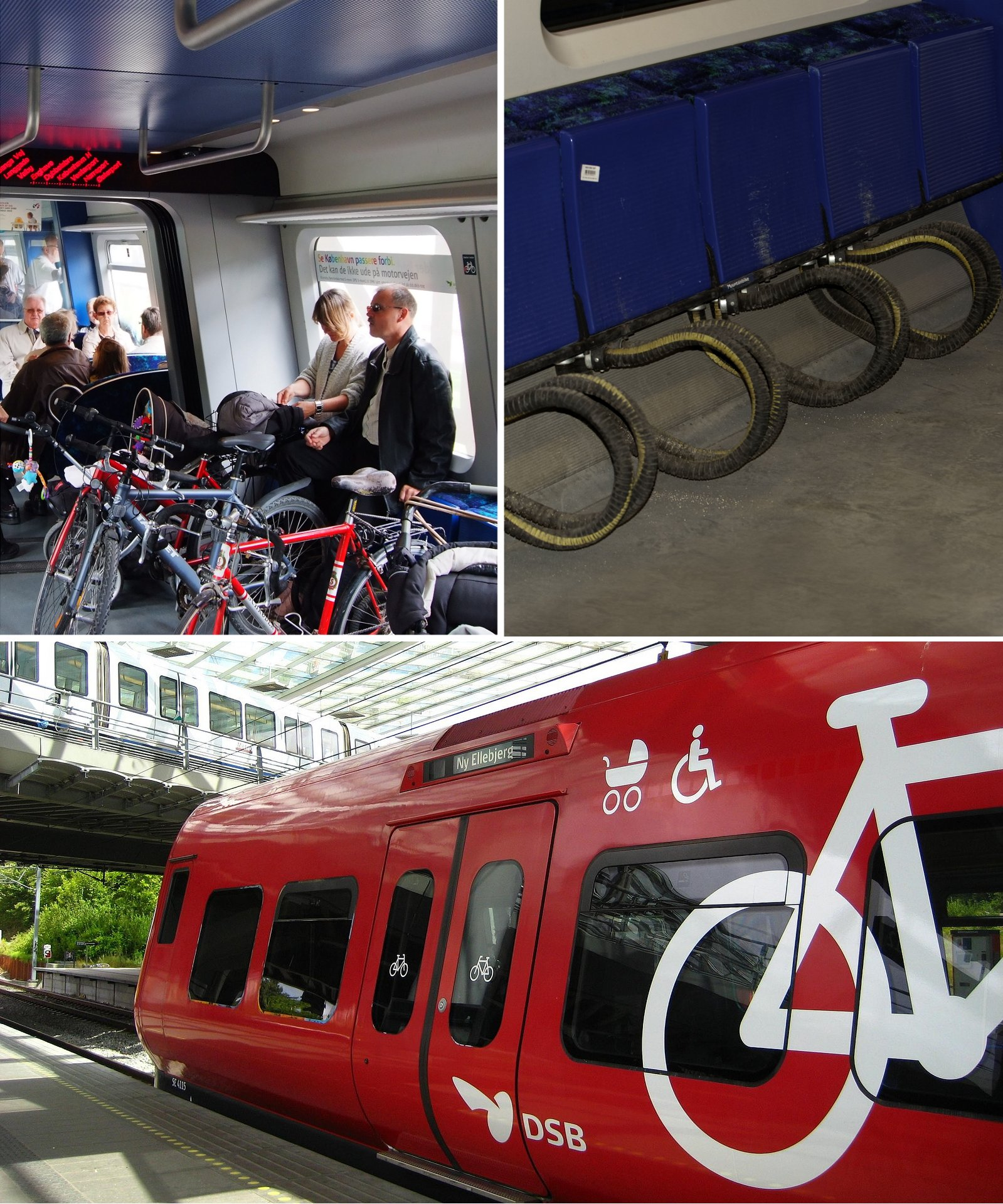

The fourth generation, in service since 1996, are distinguished by their plump appearance due to their curved sides.

Two variants are in use, one of eight cars referred to as Class SA (formed of vehicles SA-SB-SC-SD-SD-SC-SB-SA) and one of four cars referred to as Class SE (formed SE-SF-SG-SH)

These are articulated units supplied by Alstom-LHB and Siemens with prefabricated friction stir welded aluminium roof panels made by Marine Aluminium from Sapa extrusions, and were manufactured from 1996 to 2007. The cars are shorter than conventional railway cars; each has a single axle under one end, the other end being supported by the neighbouring car. (The end cars have two axles each). They have automatic Scharfenberg couplers at the ends; in peak hours most trains consist of two coupled units, giving a total train length of 168 meters. They have video surveillance to ensure passenger and staff security and to prevent acts of vandalism. These trains introduced air conditioning in the interior and regenerative braking to the network, increasing energy efficiency. At present, there are 105 8-car trains (840 cars).

An accident involving an 8-car fourth-generation train in 2002 caused it to be scrapped, necessitated the construction of 4-car sets to relieve the shortage of trains. These 4-car units (DSB class SE-SH, also known as Litra SE) can run solo in low-traffic intervals. At present, there are 31 4-car trains (124 cars) serving the S-train network.

The top speed of fourth-generation trains is 120 km/h (75 mph), although on many parts of the network their speed is limited to 90 km/h (55 mph) to 100 km/h (60 mph) due to the limitations of the signalling system, and on the Ringbane they travel at 80 km/h (50 mph).

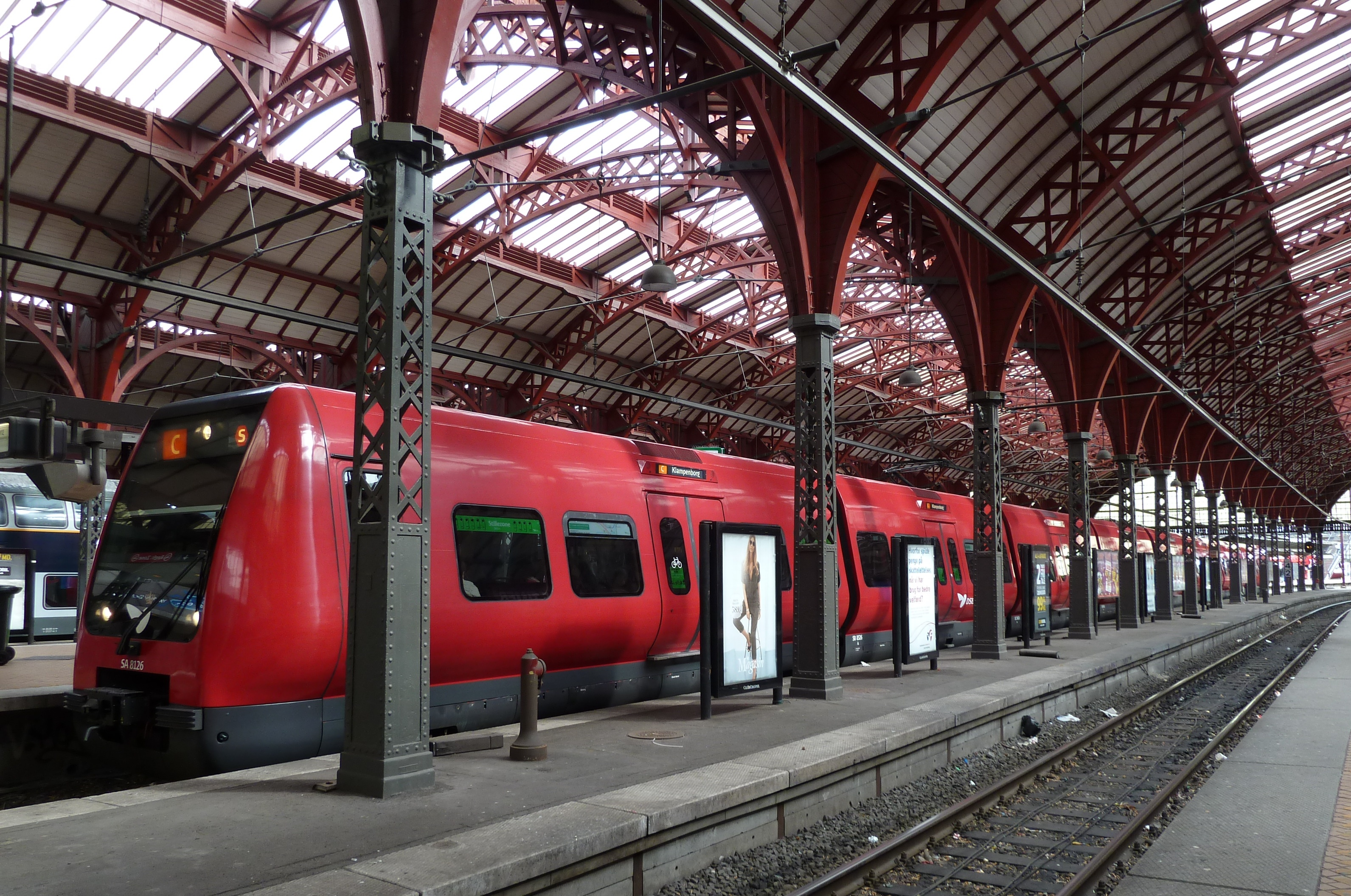

=== Fifth generation (2032–) ===
In September 2023, DSB shortlisted Alstom, CAF and a Siemens/Stadler consortium as the three prequalified bidders to manufacture 226 new trains.

On 14 January 2026, DSB awarded a 23 billion kr. contract to the Siemens/Stadler consortium to supply at least 226 fully driverless trains, together with a 30 year maintenance agreement. The 56 m (185 ft) four-car trains will operate at GoA4, and are scheduled to enter service from 2032, initially on Line F. Full automation of the network is planned by 2040. Each trainset will provide 156 seats, 16 bicycle spaces, and two wheelchair spaces, have a maximum speed of 120 km/h (75 mph), and be capable of operating in multiple units of up to three trains.

== See also ==
- List of Copenhagen S-train stations
- S-Bahn
- List of DSB locomotives and multiple units
- Trams in Copenhagen
- List of commuter rail systems for similar S-train systems
