= Søren Frich =

Danish engineer and politician

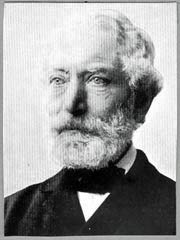
- Søren Frich
- Born: 20 September 1827; Horsens, Denmark
- Died: 7 May 1901 (aged 73); Aarhus, Denmark

Søren Frich (20 September 1827 – 7 May 1901) was a Danish engineer, factory owner and city Councillor who built the Frichs company, with headquarters and main production in Aarhus. He became one of the largest employers in Aarhus and the Frichs factory became one of the only locomotive producers in Denmark. Frich was elected to the Aarhus city council three times.

Søren Frich was born in Nim Parish in the manor Bolund west of Horsens in 1827. He was the son of Johan Peter Frich and Johanne Marie Harpøth. His father was a lawyer and later a member of Landstinget. From 1842 to 1845, Frich attended the technical school in Aarhus and then moved to Copenhagen where he attended Polyteknisk Læreanstalt (Polytechnic Academy). Between 1848 and 1850, he served with the Danish military during the First Schleswig War. He was wounded in the Battle of Isted and lost a lung to a gunshot wound. After convalescing, he moved to Frederiksværk to study iron casting. Two years later, in 1852, he took a study trip to England and Belgium. On this trip, he noticed how far ahead other countries were in terms of industrial production, compared to Denmark.

In summer of 1853, Frich returned home to Aarhus and the following year he established a new factory on the corner of Søndergade and Sønder Allé. He bought the land with funds borrowed from his father and got permission to build his foundry in less than a month. He proceeded to use the knowledge he had obtained during his travels and quickly built a reputation for skill and reliability. The factory initially produced tools and implements for agriculture and construction. During the Industrial Revolution, production was diversified to wind mills, trains and steam engines. Especially his machines for the oil and soap industries won acclaim and at the 1878 World's Fair in Paris Frich won a bronze medal for these products. In 1885, Frich resigned and sold the factory, then the largest industrial employer in the city.

Søren Frich was also politically active but with varying success. In 1870, he was elected to the city council for Højre. He started his tenure with a proposal to expand the harbor north of the city and to include a ship yard. The proposal did not get the necessary votes and in response, Søren Frich resigned from the city council. Public pressure brought him back, but in 1872 he resigned again. In 1882, he was elected for a third and last time, this time lasting a month. Although his political career did not bring great results, he continued to make his voice heard in the local press, frequently arguing for larger port facilities. His well-researched letters and publications would eventually form the basis for future harbor expansions.

Søren Frich died on 7 May 1901 and was buried on Åbyhøj Church cemetery.
