= DSB class F =

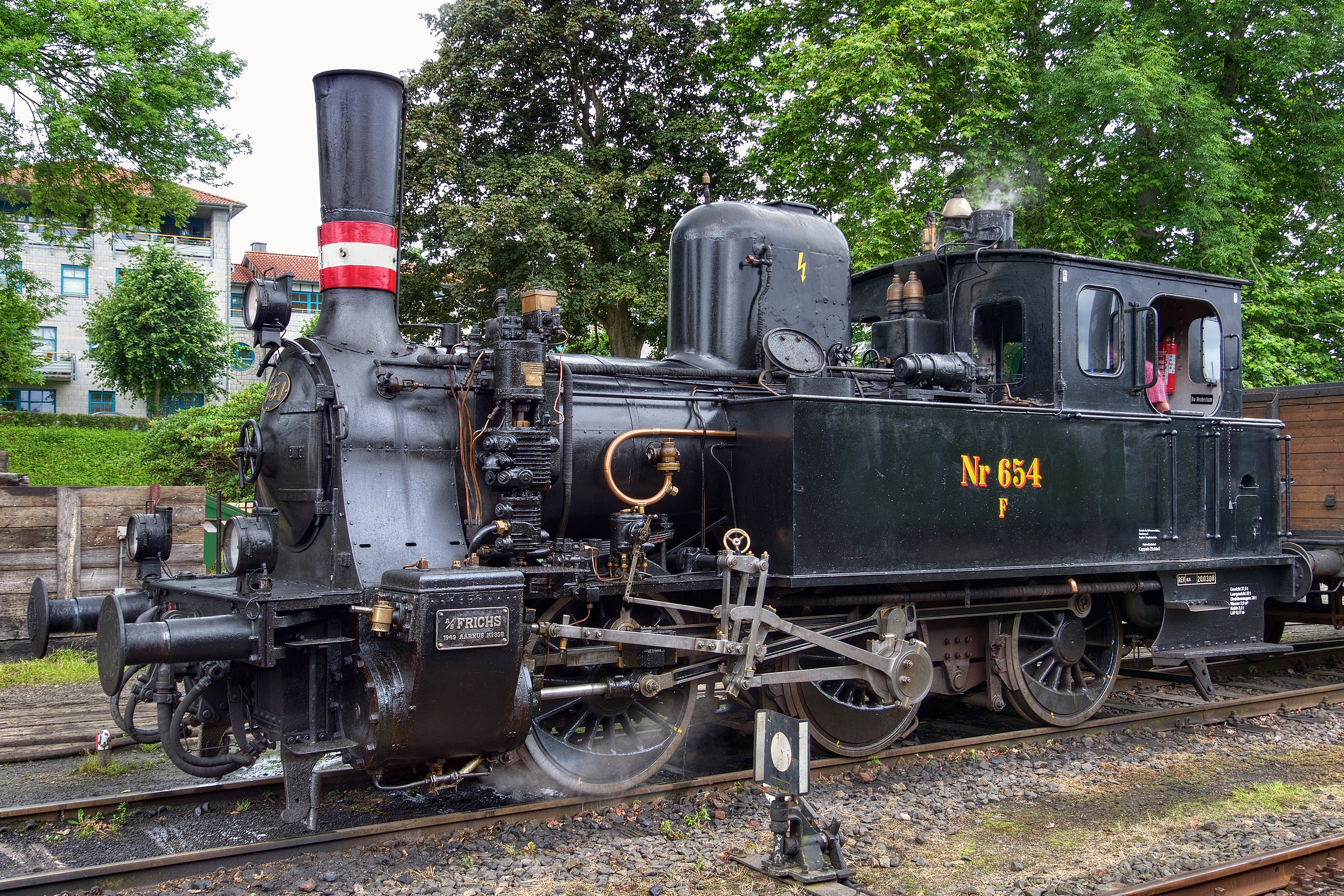
- F 654 on the Angeln Steam Railway heritage railway in Kappel, South Schleswig, Germany, 2012.
Type and origin
- Power type: Steam
- Builder: Saronno, Breda, Hüttemeier, Hanomag, Henschel, Borsig, Tubize & Frichs
- Build date: 1898-1901, 1903, 1909-1910, 1912-1914, 1919-1923, 1949
- Total produced: 120
Specifications
- Configuration
  - Whyte: 0-6-0T
  - UIC: C' n'2t
- Gauge: 1,435 mm (4 ft 8 1/2 in)
- Driver dia.: 1,252 mm (4 ft 1.3 in)
- Length: 9,100 mm (29 ft 10 in); F 651-665: 9,170 mm (30 ft 1 in)
- Height: 4,000 mm (13 ft 1 in); F 651-665: 4,100 mm (13 ft 5 in)
- Axle load: 12.7 t (12.5 long tons; 14.0 short tons); 13.7 t (13.5 long tons; 15.1 short tons)
- Empty weight: 30.5 t (30.0 long tons; 33.6 short tons)
- Service weight: 37 t (36 long tons; 41 short tons)
- Fuel capacity: 1.5 t (1.5 long tons; 1.7 short tons); F 651-665: 2.3 t (2.3 long tons; 2.5 short tons)
- Water cap.: 3.5 m^{3} (120 cu ft)
- Boiler pressure: 12 kp/cm^{2} (170 psi)
- Cylinders: Two, outside
Performance figures
- Maximum speed: 50 km/h (31 mph)
Career
- Operators: Danish State Railways
- Numbers: F 423-427, 436-500, 651-700
- First run: 3 December 1898
- Preserved: 10

The DSB Class F are a class of Danish 0-6-0T steam locomotives, of which 120 were built between 1898 and 1949 for the DSB (Danske Statsbaner (Danish State Railways)).

These locomotive supplemented and replaced the smaller Class Hs and was used for shunting at almost every station on the DSB network. Between 1930 and 1945, the Class F was supplemented by 15 Class Q 0-8-0T locomotives. The last 15 Class F locomotives were delivered by Frichs to DSB in 1949.

== Preservation ==
A total of 10 class F locomotives have been preserved, mainly those built in 1949; some of them are operational, and six are located in Denmark. Two further examples, F 662 and F 668, were formerly preserved, but were scrapped in 2013 and 2016 respectively.

F 656 was purchased by Richard Hurlock in 1975 for 17,000 kroner, and brought to Peterborough for use on the Nene Valley Railway, which opened in 1977. It was retired in 1982 with a defective firebox and spent 20 years in storage awaiting repairs. In 2002, the locomotive commenced a major, intermittent, overhaul lasting 22 years and returned to working order in February 2024.

F 654 was used by the Angeln Steam Railway in Germany for its museum train until it was withdrawn in 2017; by then it was in need of boiler repairs. In 2020, F 654 was bought by the Kittel Foundation, which is based in the Neumünster depot.
