= Frichs =

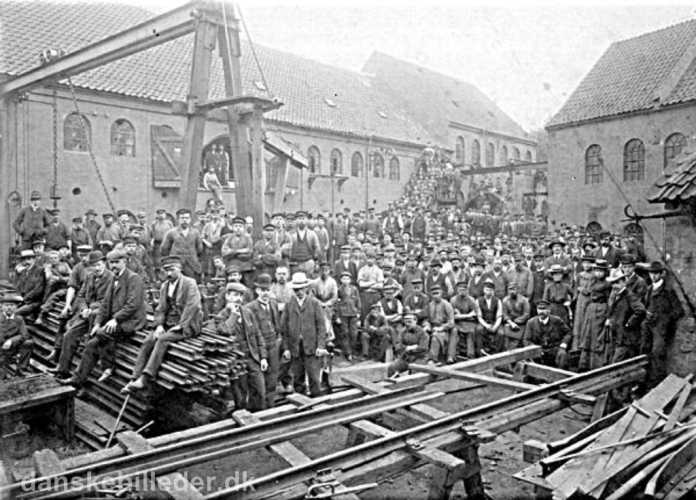
- Frichs workers assembled for the 50 year anniversary in 1904
- Type: Public limited company
- Industry: Manufacturing
- Founded: 1854
- Founder: Søren Frich
- Headquarters: Aarhus, Denmark
- Area served: Worldwide
- Products: Locomotives

Frichs is a Danish company based in Horsens, founded in 1854 in Aarhus. Frichs today produce ship engines but started out in the 19th century producing a long range of farm and industry equipment, ships, church bells, cranes and later through the 20th century locomotives and train carriages. In the early to mid 20th century it was a major company and employer in Aarhus at its height employing some 1000 people. The company was the sole Danish supplier of locomotives for the Danish State Railways from 1919 to the mid 1950s and sold locomotives across Europe and to Siam and New Zealand. In 1980 the company was sold to Kosan and then restructured and rebased to Horsens.

== History ==
Frichs was founded by Søren Frich in 1854 in Aarhus under the name Frich Jernstøberi og Maskinfabrik (Frich Ironworks and Machine Factory) focused primarily on farm equipment and cast iron products such as furnaces, ovens and steel girders. In 1855, Frich specialized in parts for the water and windmill industry and the same year produced its first steam engine. The production was varied and the company became the primary supplier when the Ceres Brewery was established in 1856. In 1885 Søren Frich sold the company to his nephew and retired.

In the late 19th century the company gradually focussed more on machine production and the foundry came to play a smaller part. In the early 20th century rail transport became more important and the rail network was greatly expanded. The locomotives and trains were mainly purchased from Germany or England and it became a priority for the government to establish a domestic production to ensure supply security in a politically uncertain time. The First World War and the events leading up to it delayed the process but in 1919 Frich was selected to enter a 5-year contract with Danish State Railways as the exclusive domestic producer of locomotives licensed from the German company Borsig.

Through the early 20th century to the 1950s Frichs produced a long range of licensed steam and diesel locomotives and it became the main revenue stream for the company. In 1930, Frichs sold 12 locomotives to Siam which was used as a springboard to the international markets, mainly in Europe. Through the following decades locomotives were exported to France, Sweden, the Netherlands, Belgium, Spain, Finland, Estonia and New Zealand.

In 1954, the Danish State Railways decided to transition to diesel locomotives and commissioned the DSB Class MY. The production of the units became a political matter between the government, unions and industry as it was debated if Frichs had the technical skill and know-how to produce the diesel trains. In a compromise DSB contracted two locomotives from Frichs and B&W as a test to be delivered in 1955 and then a few months later bought 20 units from Swedish NOHAB. The Frichs locomotives MY 1201 and 1202 were severely delayed and Frichs was subsequently relegated to a role as supplier to NOHAB.

The following years was mainly focused on maintaining existing rail stock and production of industry equipment but production gradually faltered through the 1970s and in 1980 the company was sold to Kosan and then restructured and rebased to Horsens. In 1986, the production site in Åbyhøj, Aarhus was repurposed as a business park now known as Frichsparken, owned and administered by construction company Byggeselskab Olav de Linde.

== Locomotives ==
- DSB Class MH
- DSB Class MT
- DSB Class MY
- DSB Class MX
- DSB Class MZ
- DSB class D
- DSB class E
- DSB class F
- DSB Class R
- DSB Class MY 1201 and 1202
- DSB class MR
- VR Class Tk3

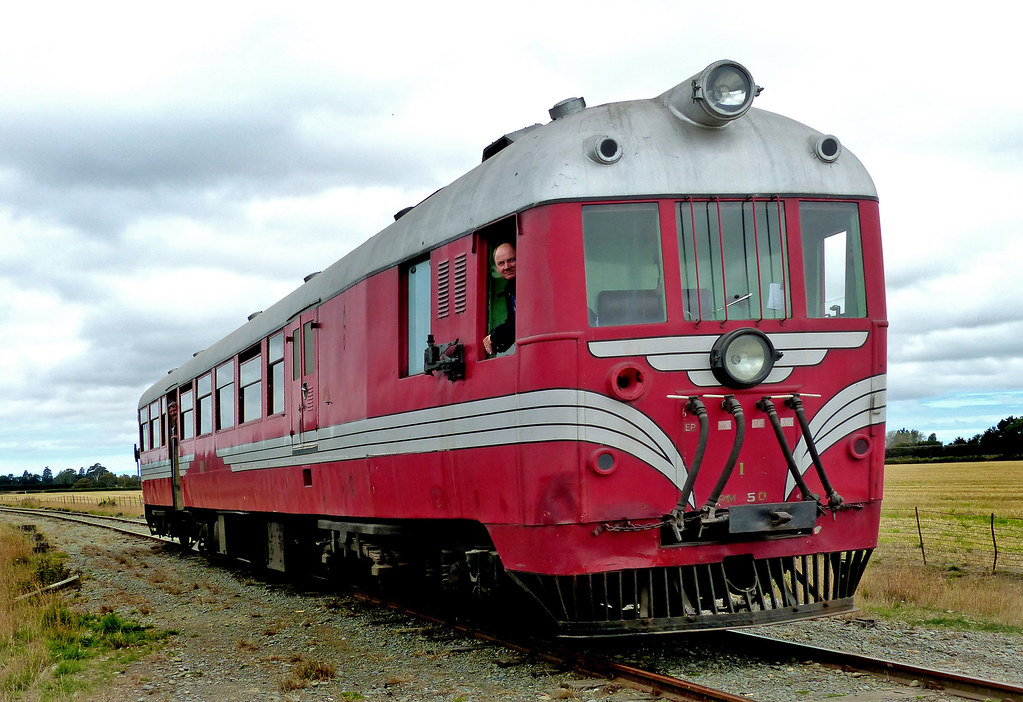

== See also ==
- EML Tasuja (A432)
- NZR RM class (Vulcan)
