= DSB Class MY 1201 and 1202 =

DSB class MY
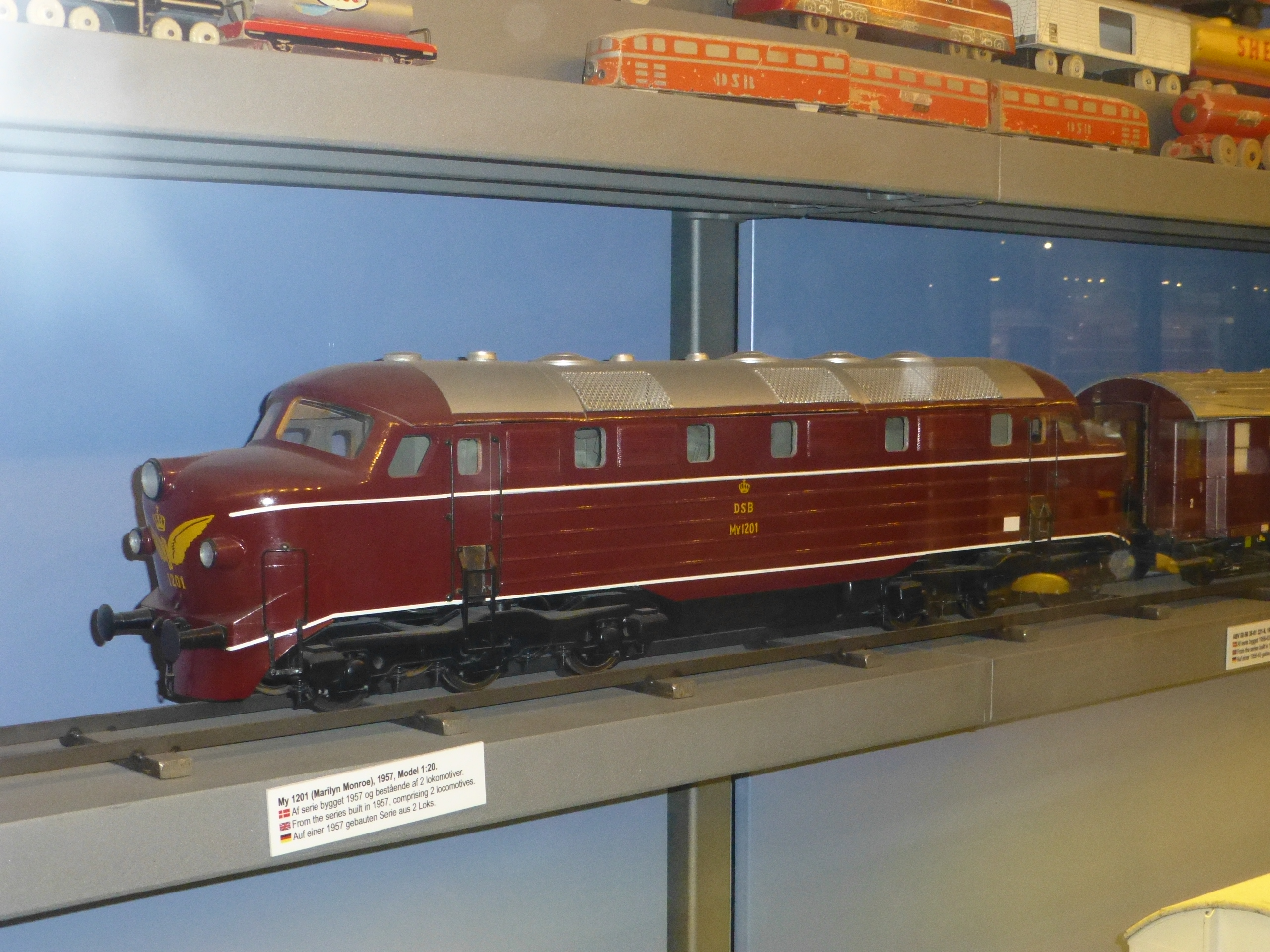
- Model of DSB MY 1201 in the Danish Railway Museum
Type and origin
- Power type: Diesel–electric
- Builder: Frichs
- Total produced: 2
Specifications
- Configuration
  - UIC: (A1A)′(A1A)′
- Gauge: 1,435 mm (4 ft 8 1/2 in)
- Pivot centres: 10.30 m (33.8 ft)
- Length
  - Over buffers: 18.90 m (62.0 ft)
- Loco weight: 106 t (104 long tons; 117 short tons)
- Prime mover: B&W 1622VL-34V
- Engine type: V16 two-stroke diesel
- Cylinders: 16
- Cylinder size: 220 mm × 340 mm (8.66 in × 13.4 in)
- Loco brake: Air brake
Performance figures
- Maximum speed: 133 km/h (83 mph)
- Power output: 1,750 hp (1,300 kW)
Career
- Operators: DSB
- Delivered: 1957 (MY 1201); 1960 (MY 1202)
- Withdrawn: 1967 (MY 1202); 1968 (MY 1201)
- Scrapped: 1971

DSB MY 1201 and 1202 were two diesel locomotives built by Frichs in Aarhus, Denmark in 1957 and 1960.

The locomotives were built by Frichs with a diesel engine produced by Burmeister & Wain, while Thrige-Titan delivered the electric equipment. In 1957 the first locomotive, MY 1201, was delivered. This was followed by the second, MY 1202, in 1960. Due to the curved forms of the locomotives the first locomotive was nicknamed Marilyn Monroe. The production of the second experienced severe delays and was nicknamed My Fair Lady after the opera which also premiered at the time after numerous delays. The locomotives were unstable and error-prone and spent longer being serviced than in operation. They were in operation until 1969 after which they were retired in 1969 and scrapped in 1971.

== Units ==
Litra	Producer	Build no.	Year	Retired
My 1201	Frichs	557	1957	1971
My 1202	Frichs	558	1960	1971
