= DSB Class MH =

MH 301–420
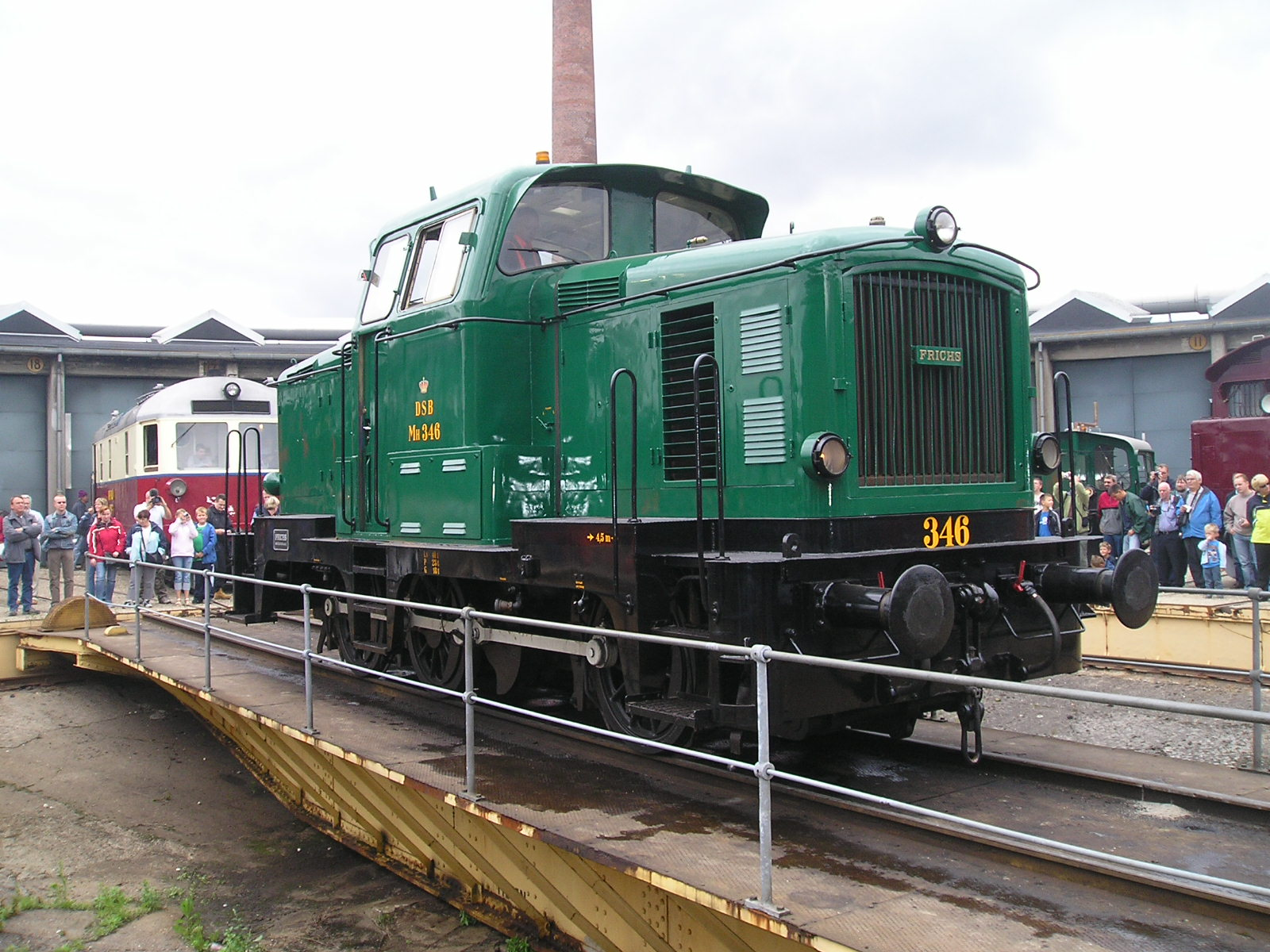
- MH 346 at the Danish Railway Museum (2005).
Type and origin
- Power type: Diesel
- Builder: Frichs
- Build date: 1960–1965
- Total produced: 120
Specifications
- Configuration
  - UIC: C
- Gauge: 1,435 mm (4 ft 8 1/2 in)
- Wheel diameter: 1,150 mm (3 ft 9 1/4 in)
- Length: 9.44 m (30 ft 11 5/8 in)
- Width: 3.13 m (10 ft 3 1/4 in)
- Height: 4.29 m (14 ft 7/8 in)
- Loco weight: 40.5 t; 45.0 t (with extra ballast)
- Prime mover: MAN W8V17,5/22A
- Engine type: Straight-8 diesel
- Cylinders: 8
- Cylinder size: 175 mm × 220 mm (6.9 in × 8.7 in)
- Transmission: Hydraulic, Voith L37U
Performance figures
- Maximum speed: 60 km/h (37 mph)
- Power output: 440 hp (330 kW)
- Tractive effort: 135 kN (30,000 lb_{f})
Career
- Operators: DSB

The class MH was a class of diesel-hydraulic locomotives of the Danish State Railways (DSB), built by Danish manufacturer Frichs. A total of 120 units, numbered 301–420, were delivered between 1960 and 1965. They were primarily used for shunting and light freight traffic.

Their design was strongly based on that of the slightly earlier MH 201–203 built by Henschel, using the same MAN diesel engine and Voith hydraulic transmission.

Apart from a few units damaged in accidents, the locomotives were mostly retired between the late 1980s and 2000.

== Bibliography ==
- Christensen, Peter; Poulsen, John (2009). MotorMateriel 7: Motormateriellet fra Frichs og Scandia 1932-1978 (in Danish). Bane Bøger. ISBN 978-87-91434-23-5.
- Lauritsen, Tom (1997). Danske lokomotiver og motorvogne 1997 (in Danish). Frank Stenvalls Förlag. ISBN 91-7266-141-0.
- Løvborg, Eilert; Mogensen, Peter, eds. (2000). DSB materiel i drift (in Danish) (2nd ed.). DSB drift. ISBN 87-7025-011-1.
- Olesen, Thomas Nørgaard (2005). Lokomotivfabrikken Frichs (in Danish). Dansk Jernbane-Klub. ISBN 87-87050-52-8.
- Poulsen, John (2013). MotorMateriel 8: Motormateriellet fra tyske fabrikker efter 1945 (in Danish). Bane Bøger. ISBN 978-87-91434-37-2.
