= DSB class D =

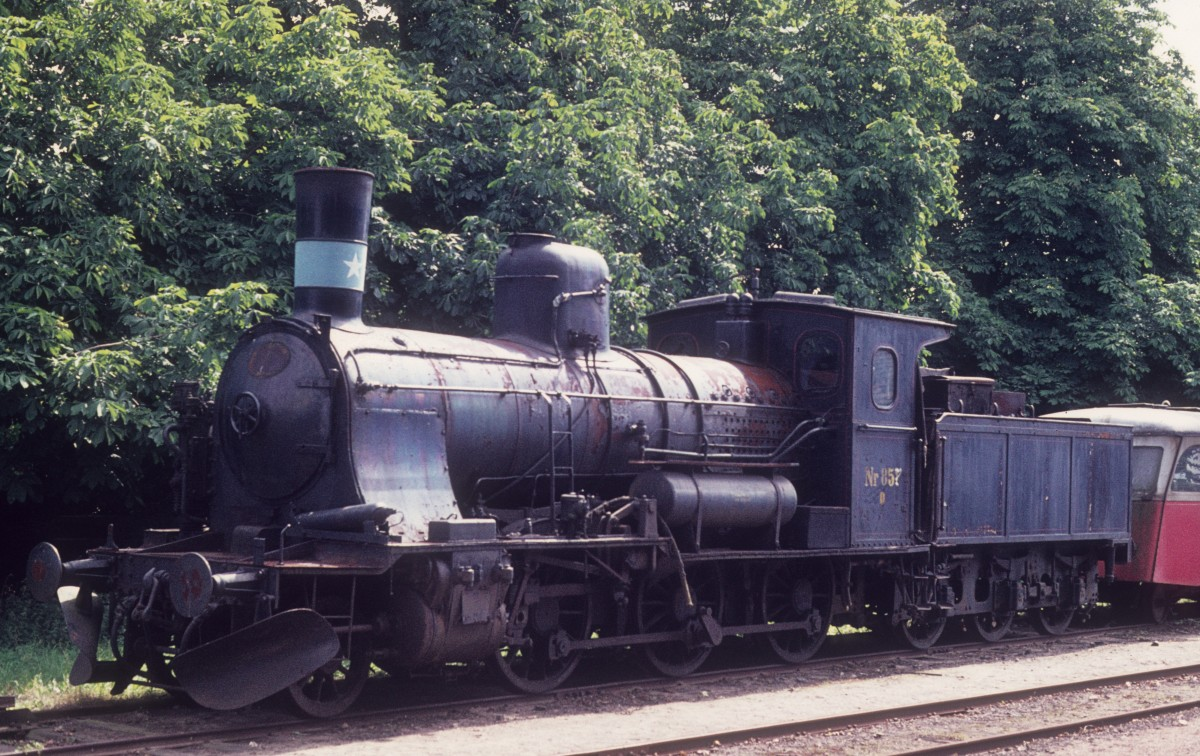
- D 857
Type and origin
- Power type: Steam
- Builder: Henschel; Sächsische Maschinenfabrik; Berliner Maschinenbau; Ateliers de Tubize; Nydquist; Baldwin Locomotive Works; Frichs
- Build date: 1902-1922
- Total produced: 100
- Rebuild date: 1925-1950
Specifications
- Configuration
  - Whyte: 2-6-0
  - UIC: 1'C n2
- Gauge: 1,435 mm (4 ft 8 1/2 in)
- Coupled dia.: 1,404 mm (4 ft 7 1/4 in)
- Cylinders: Two, outside
- Cylinder size: 430 mm (16 15/16 in)
Performance figures
- Indicated power: 580 hp (430 kW)
Career
- Numbers: D 801-900
- Withdrawn: 1970
- Disposition: Five preserved, remainder scrapped

The Danish State Railways (DSB) class D steam locomotive was a 2-6-0 freight steam locomotive developed in co-oporation between the DSB central engineering department and the German locomotive manufacturer Henschel. Class D with 100 units became the backbone of the DSB freight locomotives from the start of its delivery in 1902 until the start of the 1950s when the significance of the railway traffic started to decline. Together with the previous deliveries of the heavier 2-8-0 class H freight locomotive and then in 1952 purchased 10 Belgian-built German class 50ÜK locomotives (DSB class N), pushed the class D to the sidelines. When lightweight GM diesel locomotives class MX were delivered in the start of the 1960s, it was the swansong for class D. Only two class D engines, D 825 and D 826, were serviceable when DSB abandoned steam in 1970.

== History ==
The need for stronger freight train locomotives in the start of the 20th century made DSB order five 2-8-0 tender locomotives by Henschel in the very start of the century. The strongest DSB freight locomotive at the time was the 0-6-0 G class tender locomotive which started to be delivered in the 1880s and actually the final units were delivered when the first D class engine was ordered in 1901.

Class D was a 2-6-0, two-cylinder, saturated steam tender locomotive with 430 mm (16 15/16 in) cylinder bore, 1,404 mm (4 ft 7 1/4 in) driving wheel diameter and 47 tons serviceable weight. The engine yielded approx 580 hp (430 kW).

DSB acquired in total 100 D class engines between 1902 and 1922 to be numbered D 801 – 900. They were delivered from such different manufacturers as; Henschel, Sächsische Maschinenfabrik and Berliner Maschinenbau (Germany), Tubize (Belgium), Nydquist (Sweden), Baldwin (USA) and Frichs (Denmark). The delivery from Baldwin was quite a special story. The State of Denmark sold the Danish West Indies to the US in 1917, and part of the money received from the sale was used to buy 16 class D engines from Baldwin. The first version called class D I (one), was quite an old fashioned construction without a superheater. It including the engines D 801 – 841. The next series of engines delivered from 1910–1922, were delivered in two versions: One version numbered 842 – 851 and 865 – 900, was provided with a superheater (the very first DSB superheated locomotives) to be called D II (two). Another version numbered 852 – 864 to be called D III (three), had a larger boiler but no superheater. The engines with superheater made good experience as well as the series with the larger boiler, so DSB decided between 1925 and 1950 to modernize all D I and some D II engines into a modernized version with superheater, larger boiler and larger cab, making them the class D IV (four).

The Class D was a dedicated freight locomotive and became the backbone of DSB freight traffic on main and branch lines for half a century, though the class was also seen on passenger trains after World War 2 because of the serious lack of traction power. Its popularity earned the class, as one of the few in Denmark, a nickname; "Dagmar" which is a traditionally Danish ladies name. When the heavy Class N arrived in 1952 and later the large deliveries of MY and MX diesels started in the end of the 1950s, it was the swansong for class D. The first non-modernized locomotives of class D III started to be phased out in the 1950s, followed by a mass-withdrawal of the class in the first half of the 1960s. A few class D engines could still be found in service on the minor DSB branch lines until around 1967.

== Preservation ==
Five class D locomotives have survived. D 802 (Henschel 5982 of 1902) and D 871 (Baldwin 52434 of 1919) are owned by the DSB Railway Museum. D 825 (Sächsische Maschinenfabrik 2944 of 1905) and D 826 (Sächsische Maschinenfabrik 294 5of 1905) are owned by the Danish Railway Club (DJK), and D 857 (BMAG 4374 of 1909) is owned by Kolding Locomotive Club (KLK).
