= DSB Class MT =

MT
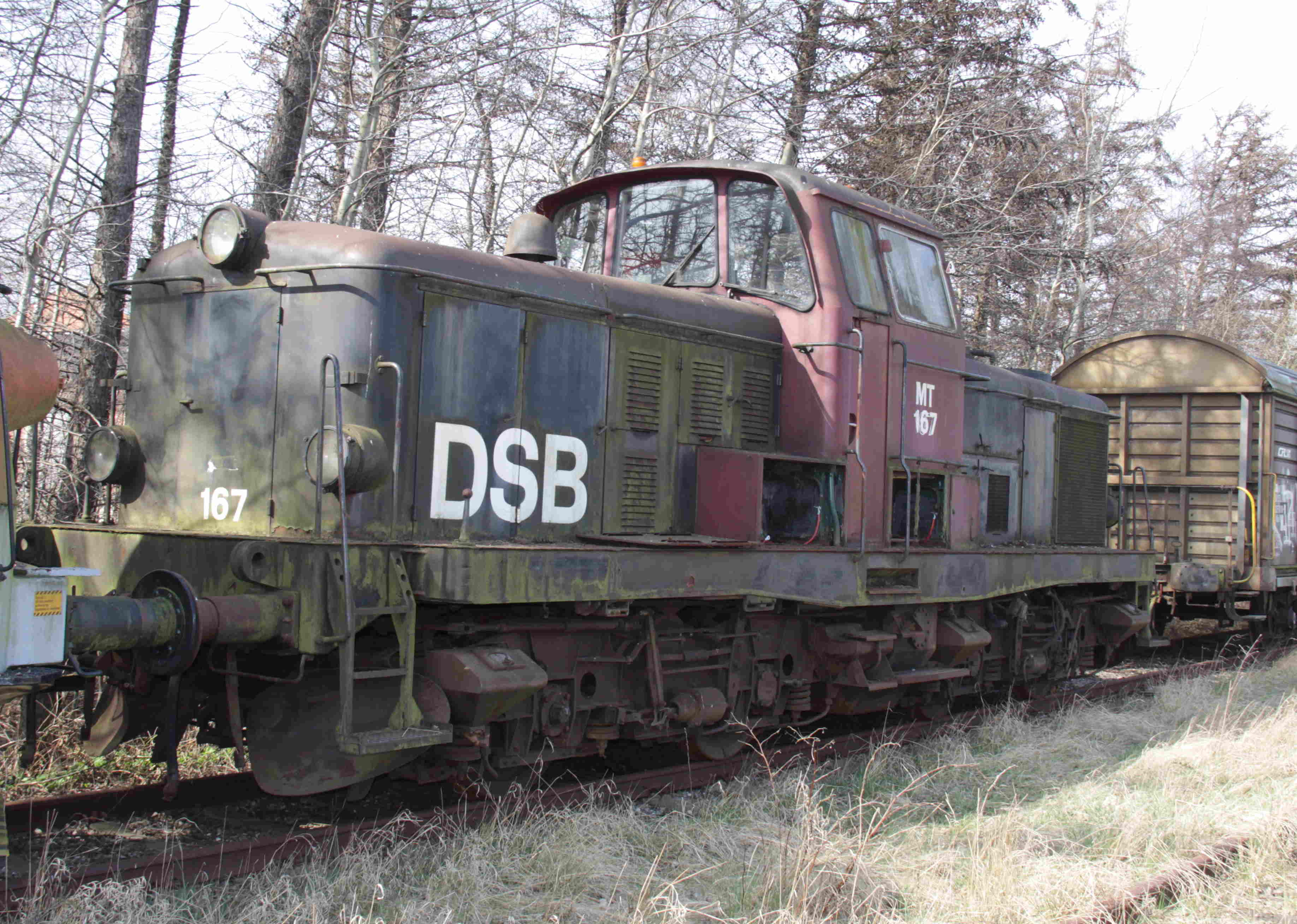
- MT 167 in Padborg (2012).
Type and origin
- Power type: Diesel
- Builder: Frichs
- Build date: 1958–1960
- Total produced: 17
Specifications
- Configuration
  - UIC: Bo′Bo′
- Gauge: 1,435 mm (4 ft 8 1/2 in)
- Length: 12.49 m (40 ft 11 3/4 in)
- Loco weight: 52.1 t (51.3 long tons; 57.4 short tons)
- Prime mover: Frichs 8.200CV (original); Maybach-Mercedes MB 820B (rebuilt)
- Cylinders: 8 (original); 12 (rebuilt)
Performance figures
- Maximum speed: 70 km/h (43 mph) (original); 90 km/h (56 mph) (rebuilt)
- Power output: 425 hp (317 kW) (original); 491 hp (366 kW) (rebuilt)
Career
- Operators: DSB
- Retired: 1990–2000

The class MT was a class of diesel-electric locomotives of the Danish State Railways (DSB). Built by Danish manufacturer Frichs, the locomotives entered service in 1958–1960. They were primarily used for heavy shunting and branch line trains. A total of 17 units were built, numbered 151–167.

The original Frichs V8 diesel engines proved unreliable, and the locomotives were rebuilt with Maybach-Mercedes V12 engines during 1969–1971.

The first class MT unit was retired in 1990 after a shunting accident, though the remaining locomotives were not retired from DSB service until 1997–2000. MT 166 remained in use as a service locomotive (tjenestelokomotiv) until 2006.

== Bibliography ==
- Christensen, Peter; Poulsen, John (2009). MotorMateriel 7. Bane Bøger. ISBN 978-87-91434-23-5.
