= DSB (railway company) =

Danish railway company

Coordinates: 55°41′15″N 12°34′46″E

- Logo of DSB

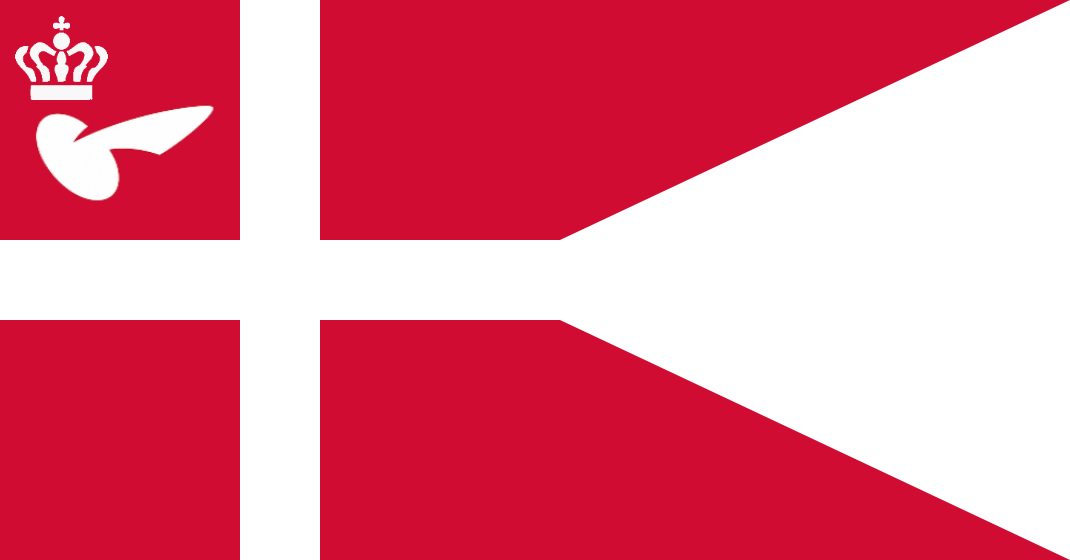
- Flag of DSB
- Type: Independent Public Company
- Industry: Rail transport
- Founded: 1 October 1885
- Headquarters: Copenhagen, Denmark
- Key people: Flemming Jensen, CEO
- Products: Passenger rail transport
- Revenue: DKK 12.3 Billion (2015)
- Operating income: DKK 522 Million (2015)
- Net income: DKK 745 million (2005)
- Owner: Danish Ministry of Transport
- Number of employees: 6,893 (2024 average)
- Subsidiaries: DSB S-tog A/S; DSB Vedligehold
- Website: www.dsb.dk

Danish State Railways
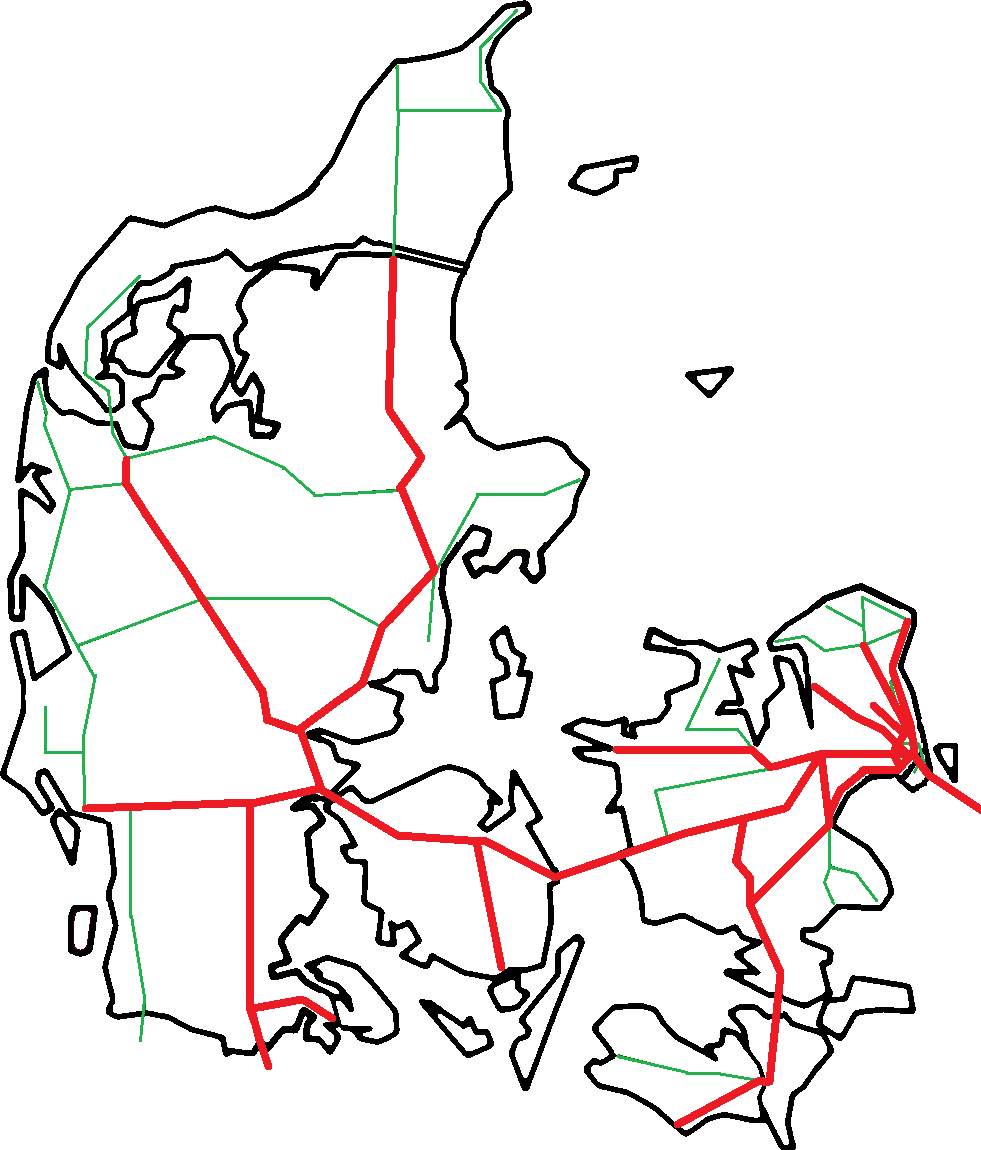
- DSB-operated railway lines in 2018 (red).

Overview
- Locale: Denmark
- Dates of operation: 1885–

Technical
- Track gauge: 1,435 mm (4 ft 8 1/2 in) standard gauge

DSB, an abbreviation of Danske Statsbaner (pronounced [ˈtænskə ˈstɛˀtsˌpɛːnɐ], Danish State Railways), is the largest Danish train operating company. It is also the largest train operating company in Scandinavia. While DSB is responsible for passenger train operation on most of the Danish railways, goods transport and railway maintenance are outside its scope. DSB runs a commuter rail system, called the S-train, in the area around the Danish capital, Copenhagen, that connects the different areas and suburbs in the greater metropolitan area. Between 2010 and 2017, DSB operated trains in Sweden.

DSB was founded in 1885, when the state-owned companies De jysk-fynske Statsbaner and De sjællandske Statsbaner merged. DSB was established in 1885, after the state in 1867 under the name De Jutland-Fynske Statsbaner took over the private company Det Danske Jernbanedriftselskab and in 1880 they also took over the privately owned Zealand Railway Company.

== History ==
The first railways in Denmark were built and operated by private companies. The railways in Funen and Jutland were built by Peto and Betts who also supplied the locomotives (built by Canada Works, Birkenhead). Most of the technical staff was also recruited from Britain, notably from the Eastern Counties Railway. When Peto and Betts went into insolvency, the Danish state took over Det danske Jernbane-Driftsselskab (The Danish Railway Operating Company) as of 1 September 1867 under the name De jysk-fyenske Jernbaner (the Funen and Jutland Railways), from 1874 De danske Statsbaner i Jylland og Fyn (The Danish State Railways in Jutland and Funen). The network was extended by new construction and by acquisition of the privately operated lines from Silkeborg to Herning (1 November 1879) and from Grenaa to Randers and Aarhus (1 April 1881).

The Danish state took over Det sjællandske Jernbaneselskab (the Zealand Railway Company) on 1 January 1880, forming De sjællandske Statsbaner (the State Railways of Zealand). With the majority of railways on both sides of the Great Belt thus owned by the Danish state, it was not until 1 October 1885 that the companies of Jutland/Funen and Zealand merged into one national railway company, De danske Statsbaner (the Danish State Railways), the merger being finalised on 1 April 1893.

After the merger, new lines were constructed and a new generation of rolling stock and locomotives were introduced by chief mechanical engineer Otto Busse. After Busse's retirement, however, DSB ceased to design its own locomotives and increasingly came to rely on outside suppliers, mainly Borsig of Berlin.

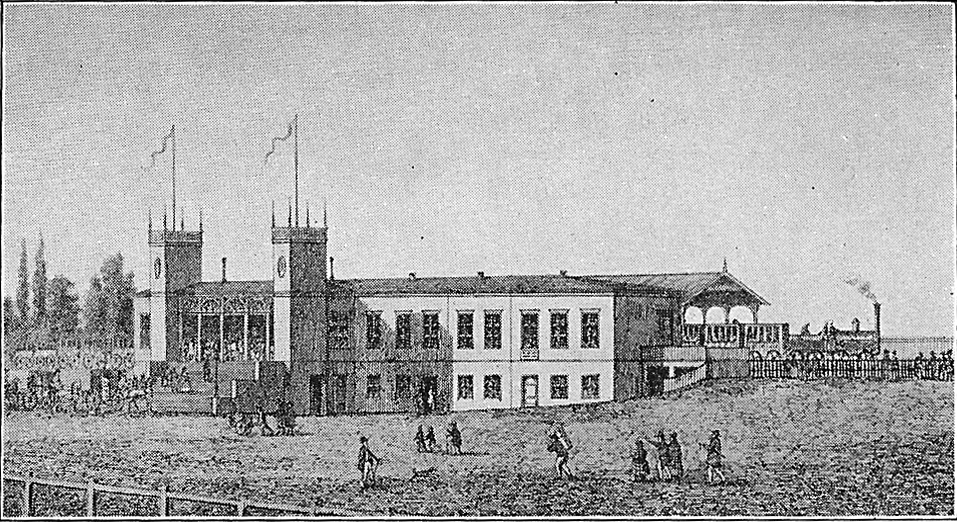
The first railway station in Copenhagen

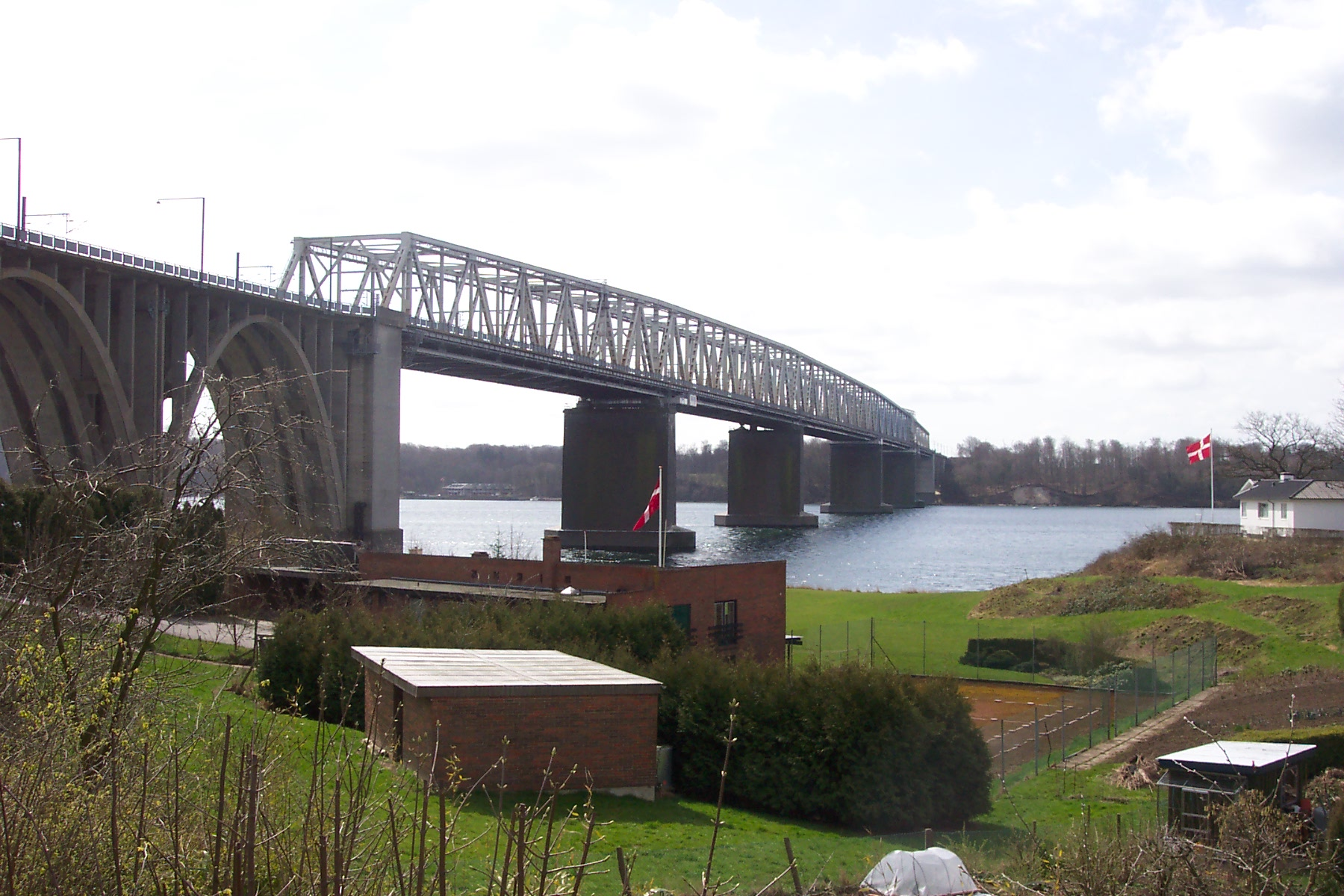
The first Little Belt Bridge was opened in 1935.

The 1930s were a decade of innovation and modernisation for DSB. New railway bridges were built across the Little Belt (1935), the Storstrøm (1937) and Oddesund (1938), eliminating the costly and time-consuming process of transfer by steam ferry. The suburban lines in and around Copenhagen were electrified for multiple-unit operation at 1,500 Volts DC (S-trains). Early experiments with Diesel propulsion led to the development of the all-purpose MO class heavy diesel-electric railcar equipped for multiple-unit operation, after World War II also fitted for push-pull operation with a driving trailer. Several classes of mainline diesel-electric locomotives were also built as prototypes by Burmeister & Wain of Copenhagen and Frichs of Aarhus, but further development was cut short by the German occupation and the consequent shortage of oil supplies, forcing DSB to rely on coal-burning steam locomotives for mainline duties.

Coinciding with the opening of the Little Belt Bridge in 1935, DSB introduced their new express train concept known as lyntog ("lightning trains"). These diesel-powered three- and four-coach trains, having a power car at each end with a power pack identical to that of the MO railcar series, featured a then-impressive top speed of 120 km/h as well as a high level of comfort, and they proved themselves DSB's most commercially successful initiative of the 1930s.

World War II left DSB with a fleet of outdated and worn-out trains, and apart from a series of second-generation MO railcars and the class MT multi-purpose centercab engines built by Frichs, domestic industry was unable to provide the kind of motive power required. Instead, DSB looked to foreign suppliers.

General Motors' diesel-electric locomotives had proved themselves in the US and Canada before the war. DSB's MV class A1A-A1A diesel locomotives, built on license from GM and delivered from NOHAB starting in 1954, were found to be very reliable and economically feasible compared to the steam locomotives, eventually putting the age of steam to an end as well as being a decisive factor in DSB's choice of motive power for nearly three decades. They were followed by the equally successful MX class with a lower axle load for branch line services and the MZ class for heavy express services.

Based on three diesel-hydraulic shunting locomotives built by Henschel and acquired by DSB, Frichs developed their own version of the class MH shunter, which replaced the steam-powered shunting engines. After the success of the Deutsche Bundesbahn's DB Class VT 11.5 class on Trans Europ Express services, DSB acquired eleven power cars and matching intermediate cars to replace the first-generation lyntog.

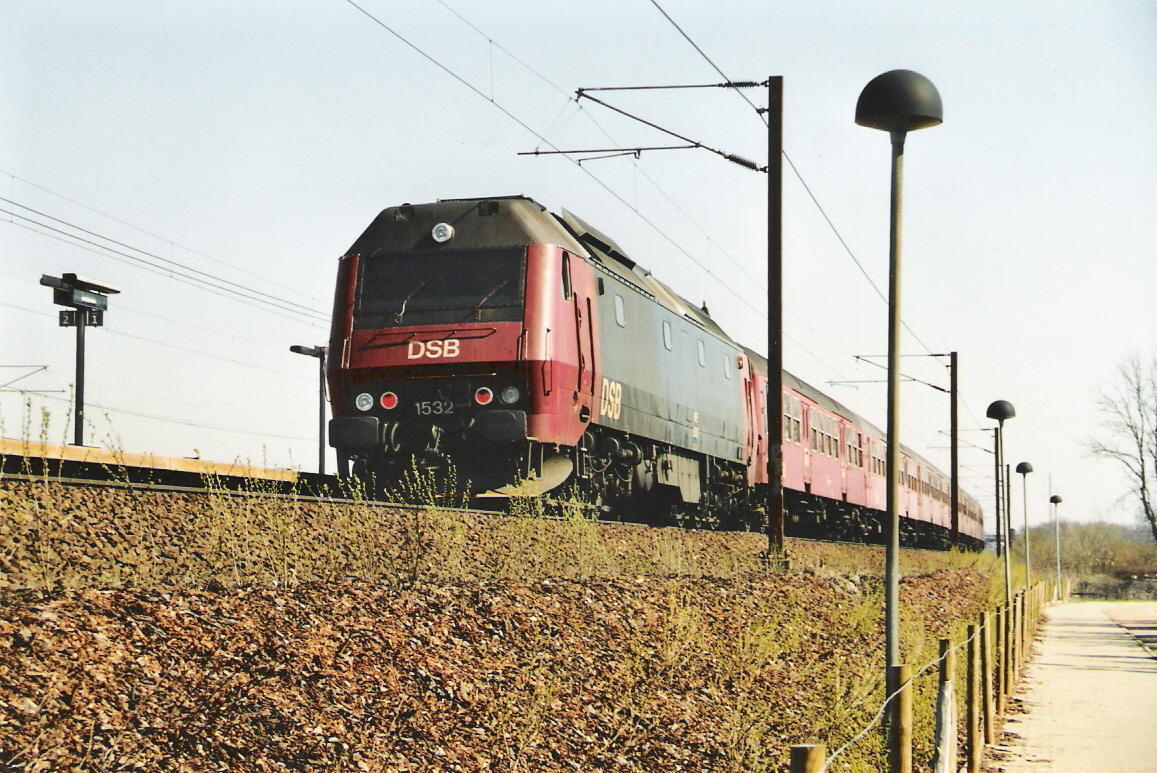
Passenger train showing the red/black livery introduced in 1972.

The 1960s were marked by an increasingly poor economy for DSB, leading to a steady staff reduction throughout the decade. However, this was also accompanied by the appearance of new technology, notably the utilisation of electronic equipment, improving the safety and efficiency of DSB's railway traffic. In 1972, along with the celebration of the 125th anniversary of railways in Denmark, DSB introduced a new corporate design by architect Jens Nielsen, inspired by British Rail and Canadian National Railways, with red as the dominant colour (with engine rooms of locomotives painted black), replacing the traditional maroon livery with yellow winged wheel symbols. DSB's position was additionally strengthened by the 1973 oil crisis.

Following the lead of the Nederlandse Spoorwegen, British Rail and Deutsche Bundesbahn, DSB in 1974 introduced a fixed interval timetable for its long-distance locomotive-hauled Intercity trains as well as the commuter services to and from Copenhagen. On regional services in Funen and Jutland, the prewar design MO class railcars were displaced by MR class DMUs, a licensed version of the Deutsche Bundesbahn class 628.

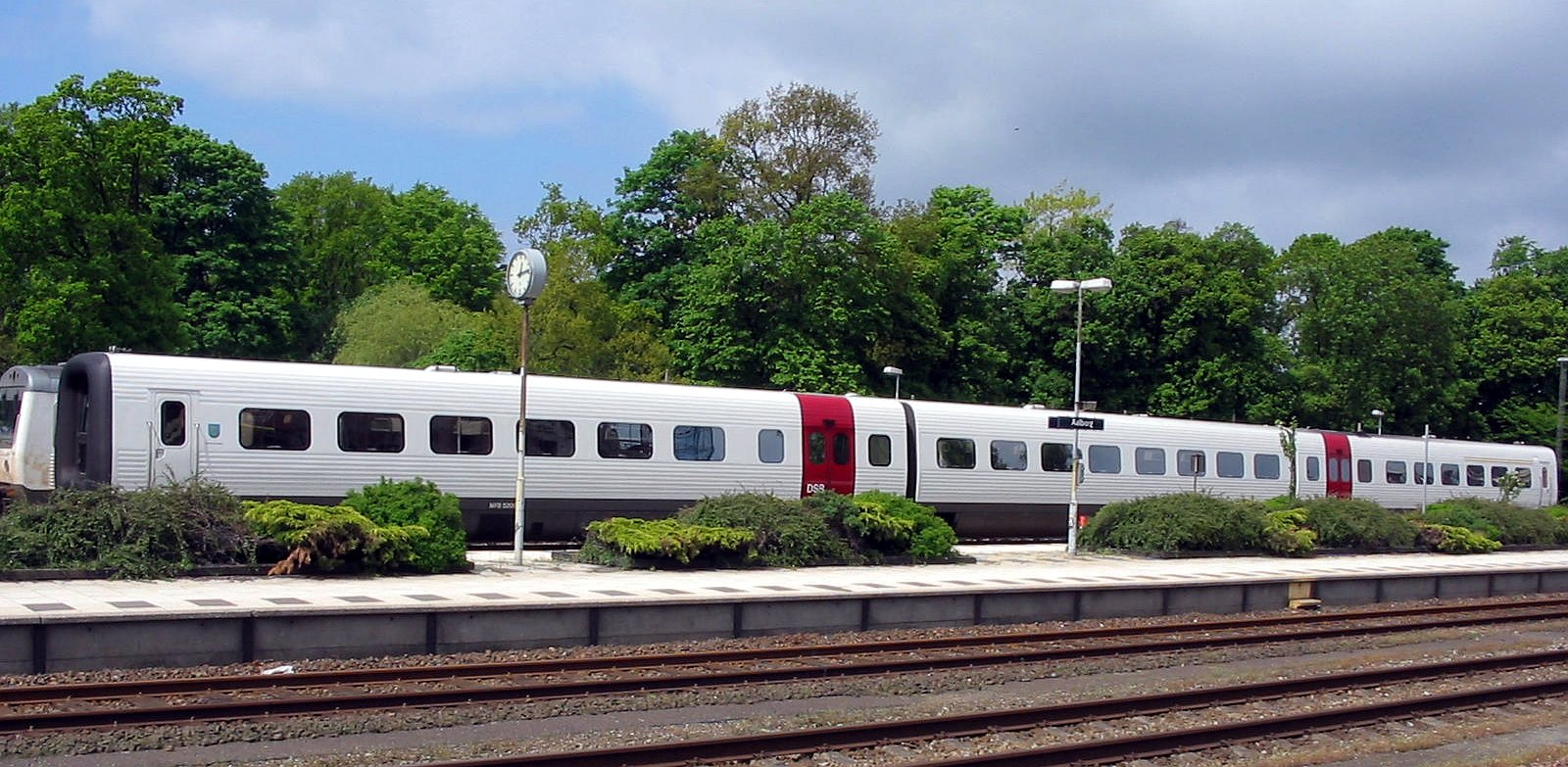
The IC3 trains were introduced in 1990.

In 1990, after a delay of several years, the IC3 trains came into use, initially as lyntog, and in 1991 as ordinary intercity trains. The IC3 trains, being a specimen of the Flexliner type of multiple units, have a distinct appearance due to the rubber-framed ends, allowing access between trainsets when coupled together. The re-engined Flexliners are now (2014) nearing the end of their service life, but due to problems with the Ansaldo Breda built successor class IC4 they are expected to remain in service for another five to ten years.

The Great Belt Fixed Link was opened for railway traffic in 1997 (a year before road traffic), replacing DSB's railway ferries. In 1997, infrastructural duties were branched off into a new agency under the Danish Ministry of Transport, Banestyrelsen (now: Banedanmark), leaving DSB with the task of train operation. A new design was presented on 30 April 1998, as well as the announcement of the "Good Trains for All" plan, seeking to replace old and less comfortable trains by 2006/2007. DSB was turned into an independent public corporation on 1 January 1999.

The goods department of DSB, DSB Gods, was merged with Railion (now DB Cargo) in 2001, and DSB now solely manages passenger rail service, including the operation of railway stations. In 2003, Arriva, in competition with DSB, won the tender for operating a number of regional railway services in Jutland: Tønder-Esbjerg, Esbjerg-Struer, Skjern-Aarhus, Struer-Langå-Aarhus and Struer-Thisted. In 2007, the Øresundståg services were hived off into a separate company, DSBFirst, but the contract was terminated in 2011 after financial problems.

DSB operated services from 2009 in Sweden. In 2010, it purchased a 50 % shareholding in German operator Vias from Frankfurt Transport Company. All the operating companies in Sweden and Germany were sold between 2013 and 2019.

== Logo history ==
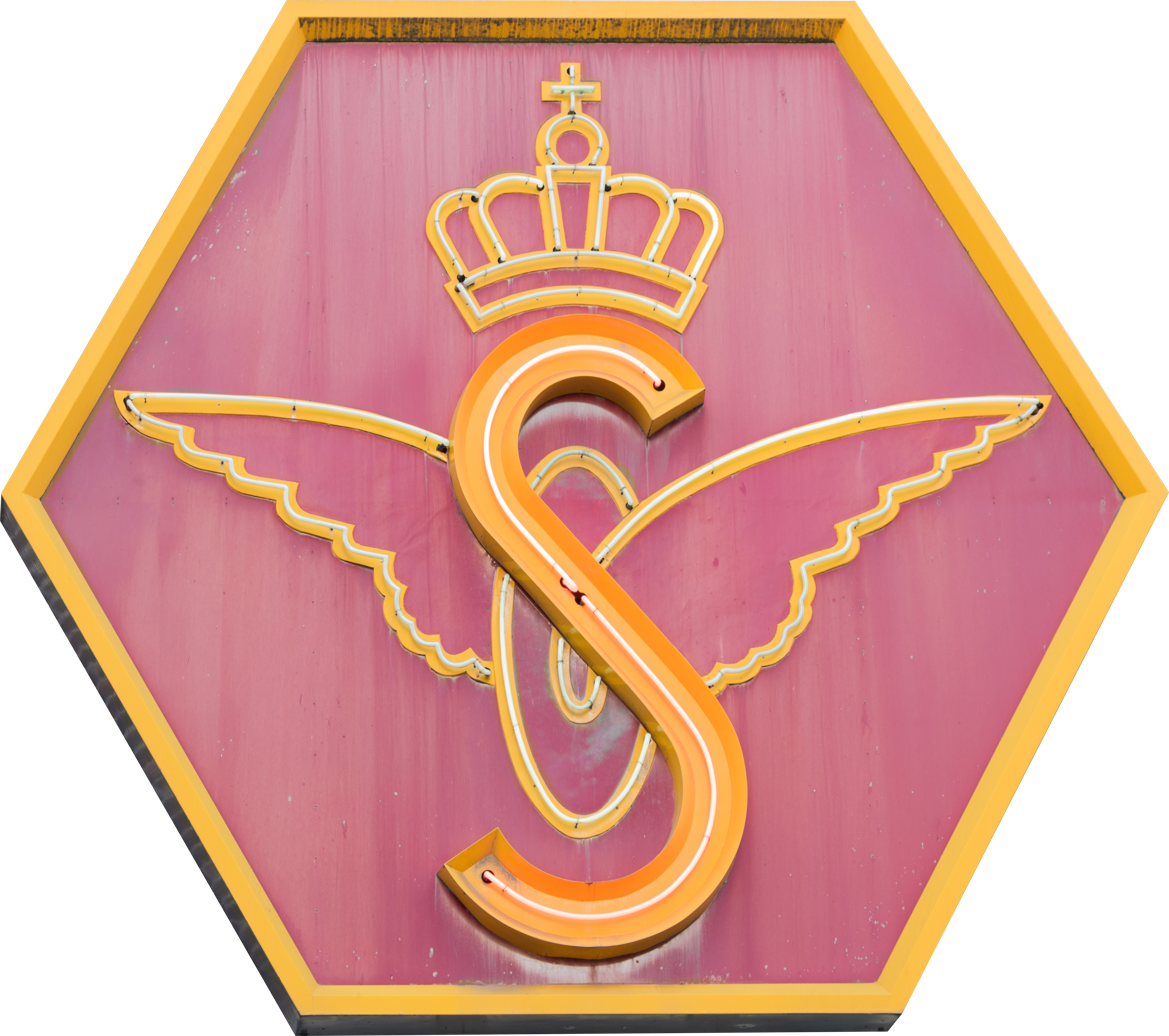
Former DSB S-train Neon logo Copenhagen

DSB's third and previous logo used from 30 April 1998 to September 2014

DSB's fourth and current logo since September 2014

== Corporate structure ==
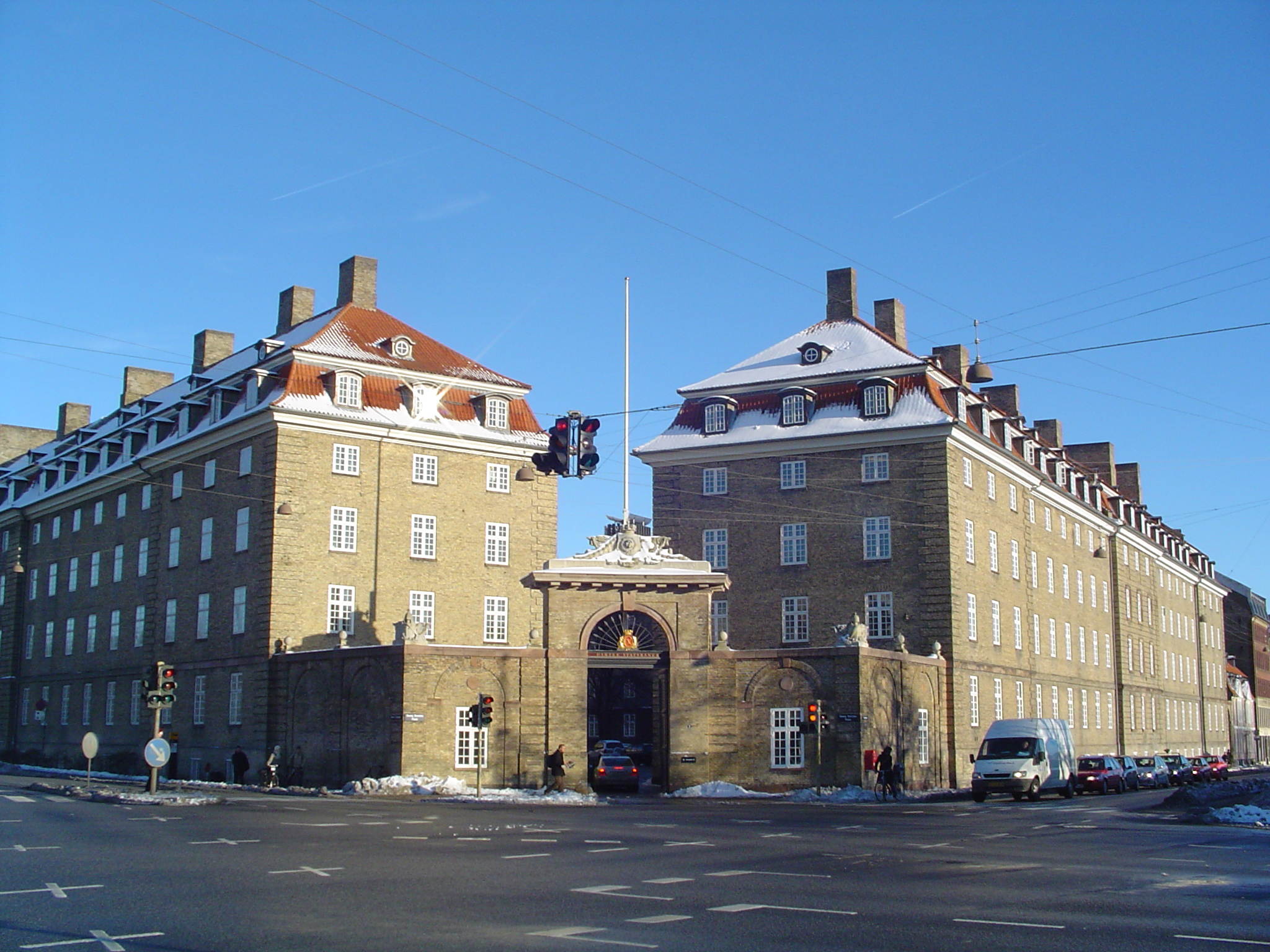
Former DSB headquarters in Copenhagen.

DSB is an independent public state-owned corporation under the Danish Ministry of Transport and Energy. This has been the case since 1999, and is the result of a former political desire to privatise the Danish railways. Thus, DSB now operates on a for-profit basis, although it retains certain public service commitments via contracts with the Ministry of Transport and Energy. In March 2015, the ongoing privatization process was put on hold until at least 2024, as part of a broad centre-left political majority agreement on passenger rail-transport.

As of 2005, DSB employs about 9,000 people. Keld Sengeløv became president and CEO in February 2004, after a career in the DSB organization since 1997, but died from an undisclosed illness while travelling with friends in Scotland on 3 September 2006. His successor was Søren Eriksen, who was dismissed in March 2011 following the discovery of financial and contractual irregularities. He was largely exonerated in a subsequent inquiry. His successor, Jesper Lok, was announced in December 2011 and took office in April 2012, but resigned in 2014. Since 2015, former fighter pilot Flemming Jensen has been CEO for the corporation.

=== Divisions ===
DSB SOV (Selvstændig Offentlig Virksomhed / Independent Public Company)

- DSB Commercial (sales and marketing)
  - DSB International (train operations abroad), DSB Detail a/s (management of shops on DSB stations)
- DSB S-tog a/s (operation of the S-train network)
  - DSB Sales
- DSB Long-Distance & Regional Trains
  - IC4 Programme, Sales, Onboard Service, Traffic,
- DSB Finance
  - DSB Property Development, DSB Property
- DSB HR & Organisation
  - Financial Management, IT, CSR
- DSB Vedligehold A/S (Train Maintenance)

== Services ==
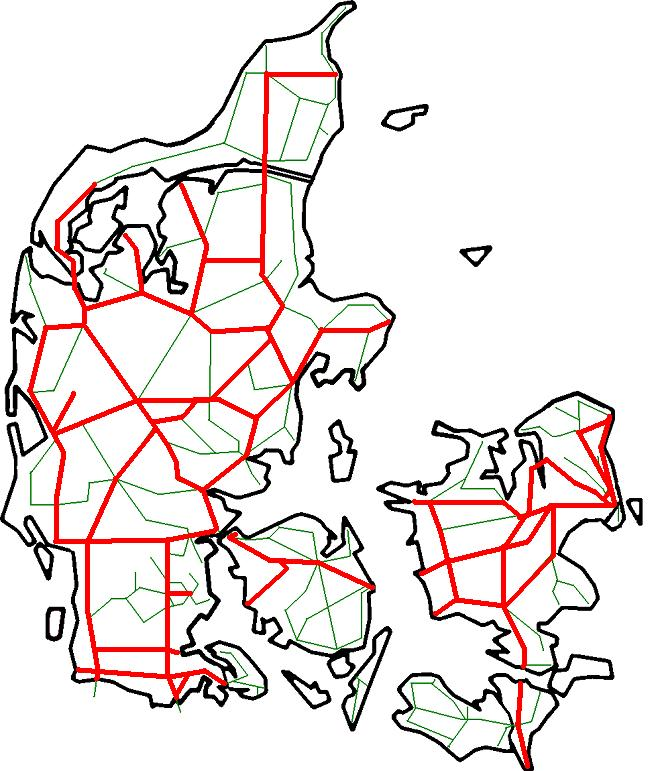
DSB-operated railway lines in 1932

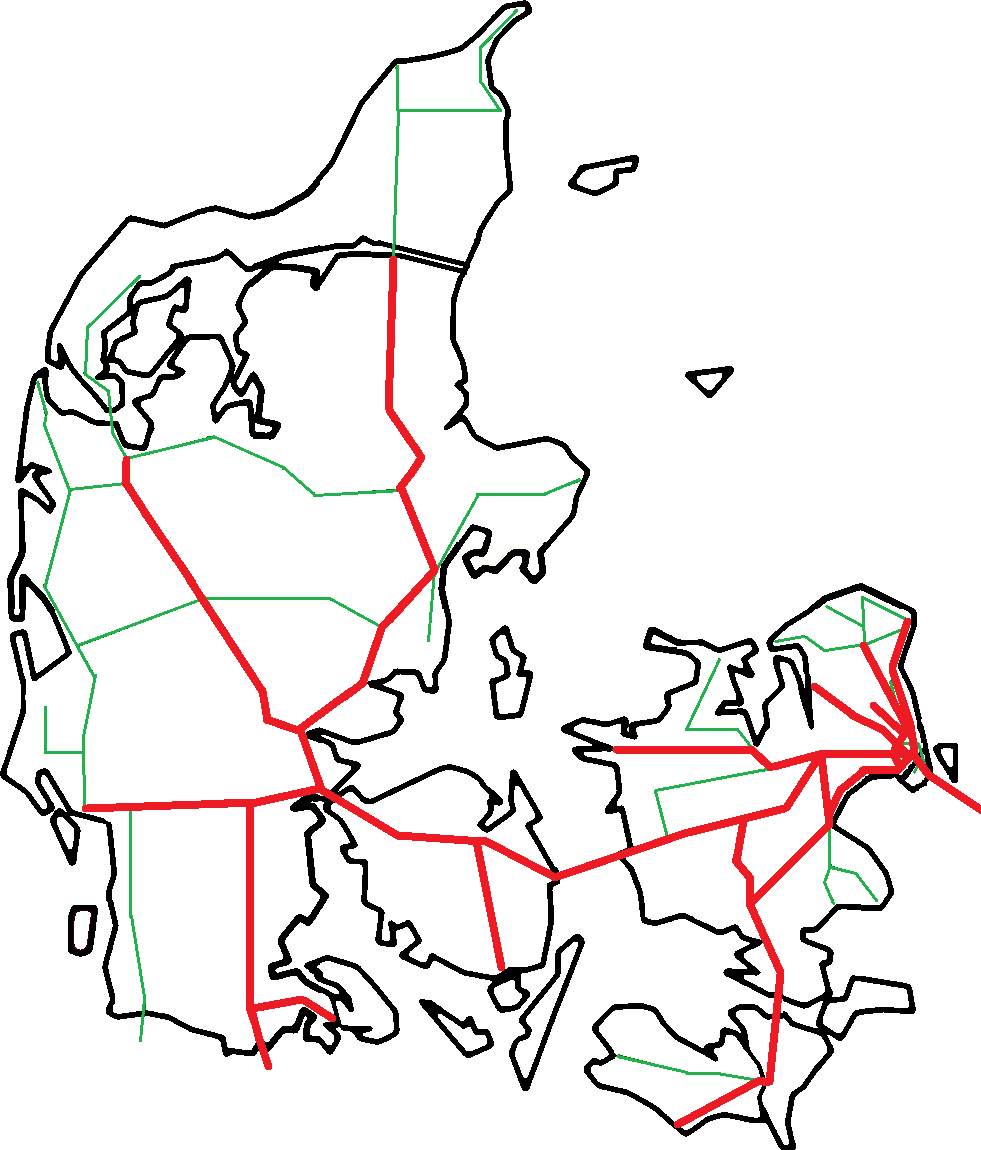
DSB-operated railway lines in 2018

A large part of the DSB railway lines (red) and services, have been outsourced, privatized or abandoned over the years.

As an originally state-owned company, DSB has experienced several reforms since its establishment in 1885. In particular, the large scale privatization reforms of Denmark in the 1990s, has resulted in the selling and outsourcing of many railway lines and services across the country.

DSB currently operates several types of passenger trains, varying in number of stops and motive power. Apart from the S-trains, types available for the general public include:

- Regional trains (RØ in Eastern Denmark, RV in Western Denmark; ØR in the Øresund Region)
- Inter-regional trains (IR)
- InterCity trains (IC)
- InterCityLyn (L) (express InterCity trains)
- InterCityLyn Nonstop (IL) (IntercityLyn calling at fewer stations)
- EuroCity trains (EC)

== See also ==
- Banedanmark
- List of DSB locomotives and multiple units
- Transportation in Denmark
- Rail transport in Denmark
- History of rail transport in Denmark
- Arriva
- DB Schenker Rail
- List of DSB railway stations

== Sources ==
- Koed, Jan (1997). Danmarks Jernbaner i 150 år. Forlaget Kunst og Kultur. ISBN 87-7600-199-7.
