= Long (model railways) =

Danish model railway manufacturer

- A variety of Long models exhibited at the Danish Museum of Science and Technology.
- Industry: Model railways
- Founded: 1948; 78 years ago in Copenhagen, Denmark
- Defunct: 1965
- Headquarters: Copenhagen, Denmark

Long was a Danish manufacturer of model railways. Founded in 1948, it produced a variety of tracks and train models in HO scale, primarily of Danish prototypes, until its dissolution in 1965.

Long's models were noted for their build quality and correctness, but were eventually unable to compete in the market.

== History ==
Long was founded by toolmaker Poul Schneider, who wished to build a model railway together with his son, but was limited by post-World War II shortages of tracks. He began manufacturing tracks on his own, initially marketed in cooperation with the hobby store "Model & Hobby"; as the track pieces, at 25 cm (9.8 in), were longer than familiar Märklin tracks, and English-language names were in vogue at the time, they received the brand name "Long". In cooperation with his colleague Christian Nielsen, Schneider launched a proper production of tracks from a workshop at Theklavej, Copenhagen, in 1948.

Rolling stock production began in 1952, beginning with a freight wagon, and soon followed by a DSB class MO railcar. The Danish State Railways (DSB) introduced the Class MY diesel locomotives in 1954 and had unsuccessfully requested a model from German manufacturers Märklin and Fleischmann. However, a collaboration between DSB and Long was commenced, and Long's class MY model entered serial production in 1956, as the first ever model of that locomotive. The first copy was given to King Frederik IX, who had a keen interest in railways.

In 1960–61, Schneider left the company, leaving Christian Nielsen's nephew John Engberg in charge, and the workshop moved to a new location in Gladsaxe. In its later years, Long's models grew increasingly austere due to financial pressures, and the company closed in the spring of 1965.

== Products ==
Long model of a class MO railcar, exhibited at the Danish Museum of Science and Technology.

Long's track pieces, the company's first product, used a three-rail system compatible with Märklin's HO-scale tracks. Their lineup grew to include straight and curved tracks as well as switches and crossings and other layout accessories.

The range of Danish rolling stock included motive power in the form of a DSB class MO railcar and a Class MY diesel locomotive, as well as passenger carriages of class CC and CD, and a variety of freight wagons. The MO and MY models were initially made for three-rail AC systems, but later also available for two-rail DC.

Between 1956 and 1964, Long train models were marketed in Norway through the company Norlek; they were sold under the brand name Tekno to avoid a name clash with a Norwegian company. The Norwegian model lineup included a NSB Di 3 based on the class MY, as well as a railcar and a variety of passenger and freight cars.

A Belgian model was also produced in 1962–63, the SNCB/NMBS Type 204, similarly based on the DSB MY.
