= GM-Gruppen =

Norwegian railway society

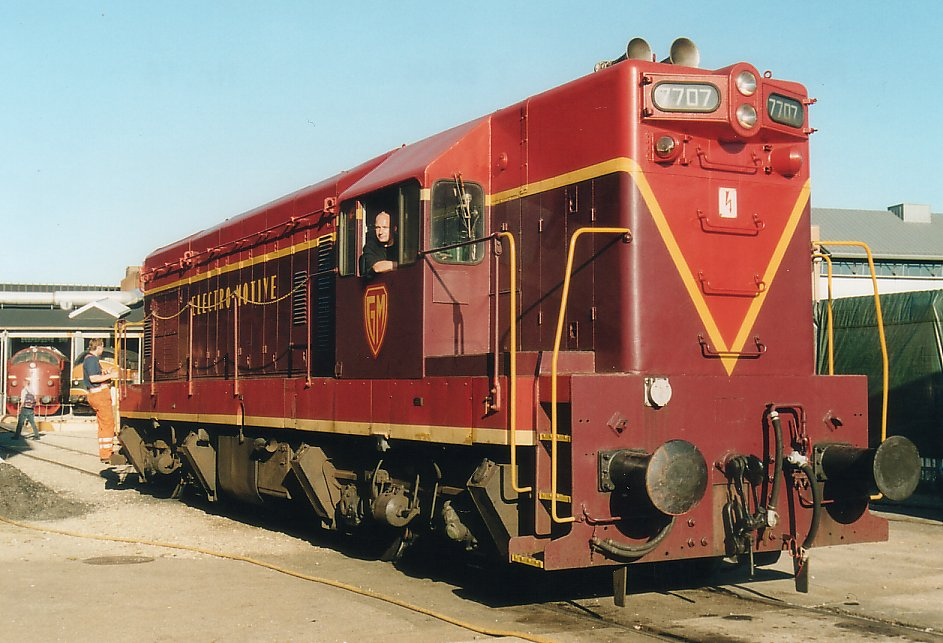
GM-Gruppen's EMD G12 in Odense, Denmark, in 2004

GM-Gruppen is a Norwegian heritage railway society that restored and operated Scandinavian diesel locomotives from General Motors Electro-Motive Division (GM-EMD). The organisation has restored one EMD G12, one DSB Class MY, one DSB Class MX and two NSB Di 3.

== Rolling stock ==
The first locomotive acquired by the society was a G12 unit number 7707 from the Swedish Statens Järnvägar (SJ). It was built in 1953 in London, Canada and sold to SJ and numbered T42-205 as the sole G12 used by the company. After it was retired in 1986 it was bought by GM-Gruppen.

In 1989 GM-Gruppen agreed to buy two Danish MX/MY units from Danske Statsbaner (DSB), numbered MY-1104 and MX-1040. They were built by NOHAB in 1954 and 1962, respectively.

The organisation also had two Norwegian locomotives, both Di 3 units from Norwegian State Railways (NSB), numbered 3.602 and 3.616. The first is a prototype locomotive while the second is a normal serial production locomotive. Both engines are owned by the Norwegian Railway Museum (NJM) at Hamar, and since 1998 GM-Gruppen has had a ten-year maintenance and operation agreement with NJM for the two trains.

The association also had a number of passenger cars. All rolling stock was sold or returned to the owner after GM-Gruppen lost their operating licence.
