= DSB Class MY =

Danish railways diesel-electric locomotive

DSB class MY
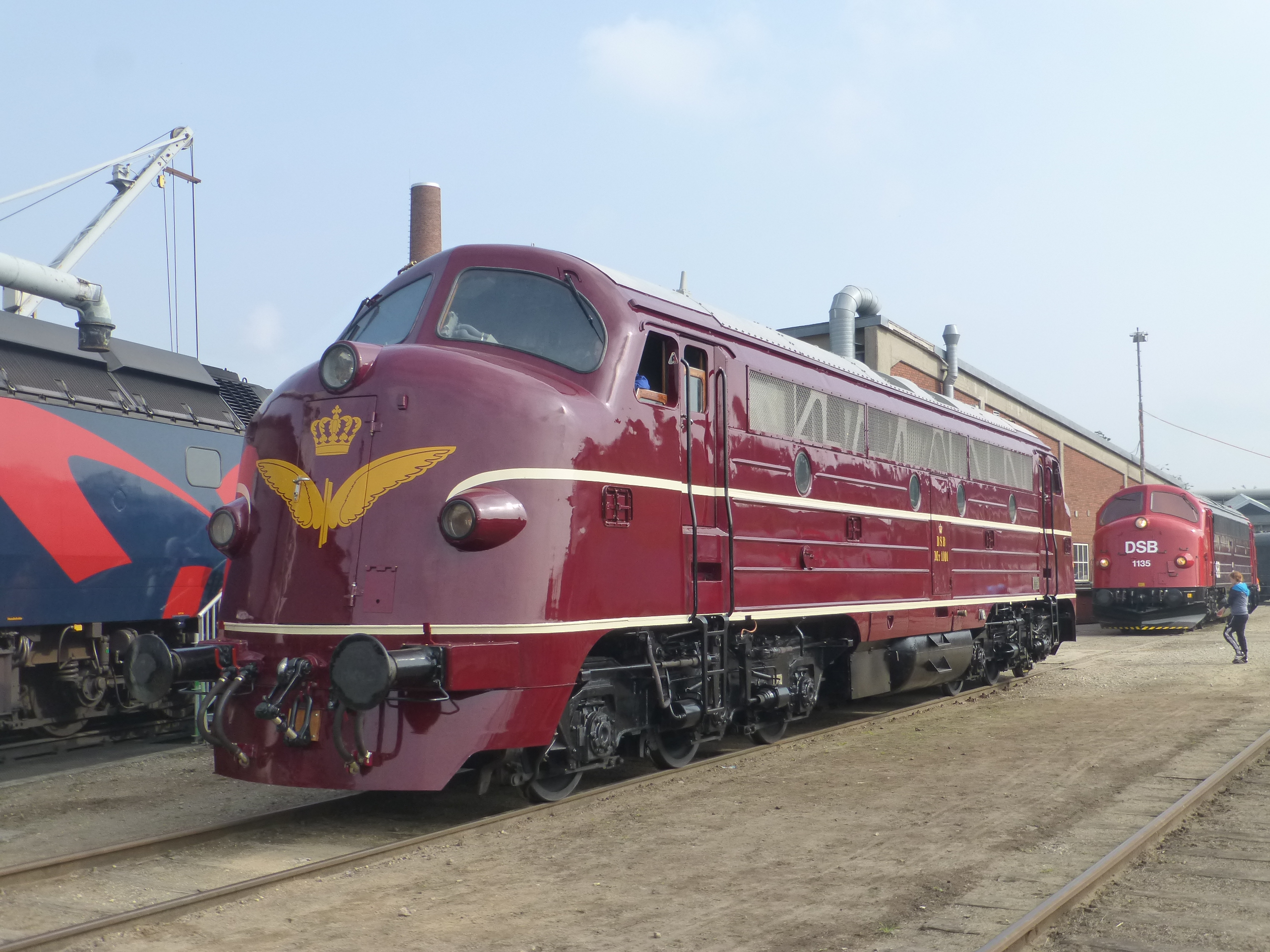
- DSB MY 1101, restored to original livery, at the Danish Railway Museum (2014).
Type and origin
- Power type: Diesel-electric
- Builder: Nydqvist & Holm AB
- Build date: 1954–1958, 1964–1965
- Total produced: 59
Specifications
- Configuration
  - UIC: (A1A)′(A1A)′
- Gauge: 1,435 mm (4 ft 8 1/2 in)
- Wheel diameter: 1,016 mm (40 in)
- Minimum curve: 90 m (300 ft)
- Length: 18.90 m (62 ft 1/8 in)
- Width: 3.00 m (9 ft 10 1/8 in)
- Height: 4.295 m (14 ft 1 1/8 in)
- Axle load: 18 t (18 long tons; 20 short tons)
- Loco weight: 101.60 t (100.00 long tons; 111.99 short tons)
- Fuel capacity: 3,400 L (750 imp gal; 900 US gal)
- Lubricant cap.: 760 L (170 imp gal; 200 US gal)
- Sandbox cap.: 300 L (66 imp gal; 79 US gal)
- Prime mover: EMD 567B; EMD 567C; EMD 567D1 (EMD 645E)
- RPM range: 275–800 rpm (567B); 275–835 rpm (567C, 567D1); 315–905 rpm (645E, mod. 567)
- Engine type: V16 two-stroke diesel
- Aspiration: Roots blower
- Cylinders: 16
- Cylinder size: 8.5 in × 10 in (216 mm × 254 mm)
- Transmission: Electric
- Safety systems: ATC (from 1995)
Performance figures
- Maximum speed: 133 km/h (83 mph)
- Power output: 1,700 hp (1,300 kW); 1,950 hp (1,450 kW)
- Tractive effort: 235 kN (53,000 lb_{f})
Career
- Locale: Denmark
- Disposition: majority scrapped, several preserved

The Class MY (Danish: litra MY) is a class of diesel–electric locomotives built by NOHAB for the Danish State Railways (DSB). A total of 59 units, numbered 1101–1159, were built in the years 1954–1965. Technically, the locomotives are based on American GM-EMD designs, marking a significant change to DSB's previous policy of sourcing rolling stock from Danish manufacturers.

The Class MY locomotives were withdrawn from DSB service between 1985 and 2001, but many have been preserved or sold to other operators. Among Swedish operators, they are known as Class TMY, and by German operators as Class V170.

== History ==
In the early 50s the DSB was starting to look for a new type of motive power that could replace steam locomotives in Denmark.

The DSB was interested in adapting the EMD F7 to Danish conditions. Such a locomotive needed to fit within a smaller loading gauge, have a lower axle load and adaptations to support buffer-and-chain couplers, as well as a cab at each end. Some such F7 adaptations had previously been implemented by Clyde Engineering for the Victorian Railways' B class, with further reductions to its profile needed for European railways.

MY 1101 was built by NOHAB alone, but all subsequent units had bodies, underbodies and bogies built at Danish manufacturer Frichs in order to limit foreign currency spending. For the same reason, and because of pressure from Danish industry, the electrical systems of MY 1105 and later were sub-supplied by Danish companies Thrige and Titan.

The DSB ordered the first four units which arrived at Helsingør in 1954. The locomotives quickly became very popular among both passengers and crew.

44 of them were built between 1954 and 1958 and a further batch of 15 engines was delivered in 1964 and 1965.

To replace steam on branch lines, a similar but lighter locomotive, the class MX, was developed, incorporating a 12-cylinder 567 engine.

In their early years the locomotives hauled express trains (later known as InterCity) and heavy freight services, but in their later years they were transferred to smaller regional and light freight services.

In the 1980s and 90s the DSB began to have less and less need for them, and the last ordinary MY-hauled train ran in 2001. One unit however, 1135, was a special service locomotive which runs special trains, so DSB still had MY locos in service until 2010, it was then handed over to the Danish Railway Museum in Odense, who uses it for heritage trains along with unit 1101. The others have either been scrapped or sold to diverse private operators in Norway, Germany and Sweden, who now use them on light freight duties. They are called TMY in Sweden (as diesel locomotives have names beginning with T in Sweden).

== Technical details ==
The first four units, 1101–1104, were delivered with 1,700-hp EMD 567B engines along with a spare engine. Having a spare engine was later deemed unnecessary and the fifth 567B engine was thus built into MY 1105. 1106–1144 were delivered with 1,950-hp EMD 567C engines. MY 1145–1159 were delivered with 1,950-hp EMD 567D1 engines. However, their powerplants were frequently swapped around among the locomotives during maintenance.

MY 1149 received a spare 645E engine (as used in class MZ, though with the turbocharger removed) after sustaining severe frost damage in the harsh winter of 1978–79.

== DSB Class MV ==
Starting in 1968 weaker MYs with 567B engines (1101, 1102, 1104, 1109, 1134) were reclassified as class MV keeping the same numbers. In 1973, MV 1104 became a MY again while MY 1144 became a MV when their powerplants were swapped. Further two MV locomotives (1101, 1134) were subsequently reclassified as class MY in 1981 and 1984 and the remainder three were taken out of service between 1985 and 1987.

== Livery ==
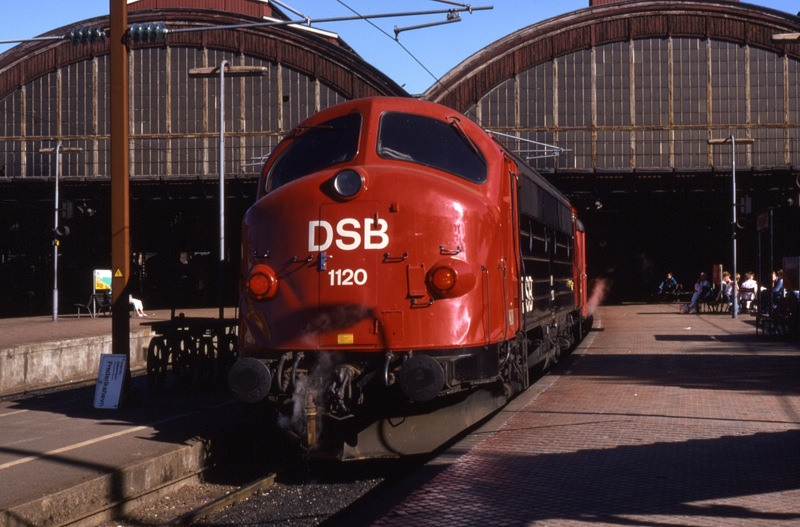
MY 1120 in red/black livery at Copenhagen Central Station (1986).

The locomotives were delivered in DSB's then-standard maroon colour, with horizontal white stripes along the mid and bottom of the sides and a yellow winged wheel at each front. Starting in 1965, the DIN 1451 typeface was slowly introduced for the lettering, and a few locomotives were given an "economy" maroon livery without stripes during the 1970s.

A new design with black sides and red cabs was introduced by DSB in 1972. The first class MY unit to receive the new livery was MY 1147 in 1972, with the remaining locomotives repainted between 1975 and 1985.

In 2000, a TAGAB TMY locomotive was repainted into a Great Northern livery for the movie Dancer in the Dark.

== Preservation ==
Several units of the MY class have been preserved:

- MY 1101 is preserved by the Danish Railway Museum since 1986
- MY 1104 was preserved by GM-gruppen in Norway until their dissolution in 2007, sold to a private owner and transferred back to Denmark
- MY 1105 was preserved by GM-gruppen (now MY veterantog) under Dansk Jernbane-Klub, but swapped in 2001 for MY 1126
- MY 1112 is on static display at the Danish Railway Museum, with one side cut open to show the engine
- MY 1126 is preserved by MY veterantog under Dansk Jernbane-Klub
- MY 1129 has one cab on display at the Danish Railway Museum since 1994
- MY 1135 is preserved by the Danish Railway Museum since 2005
- MY 1159 was preserved by the Danish Railway Museum from 2001, but sold off in 2019 to the entrepreneur Railservice and re-entered service

== Models ==
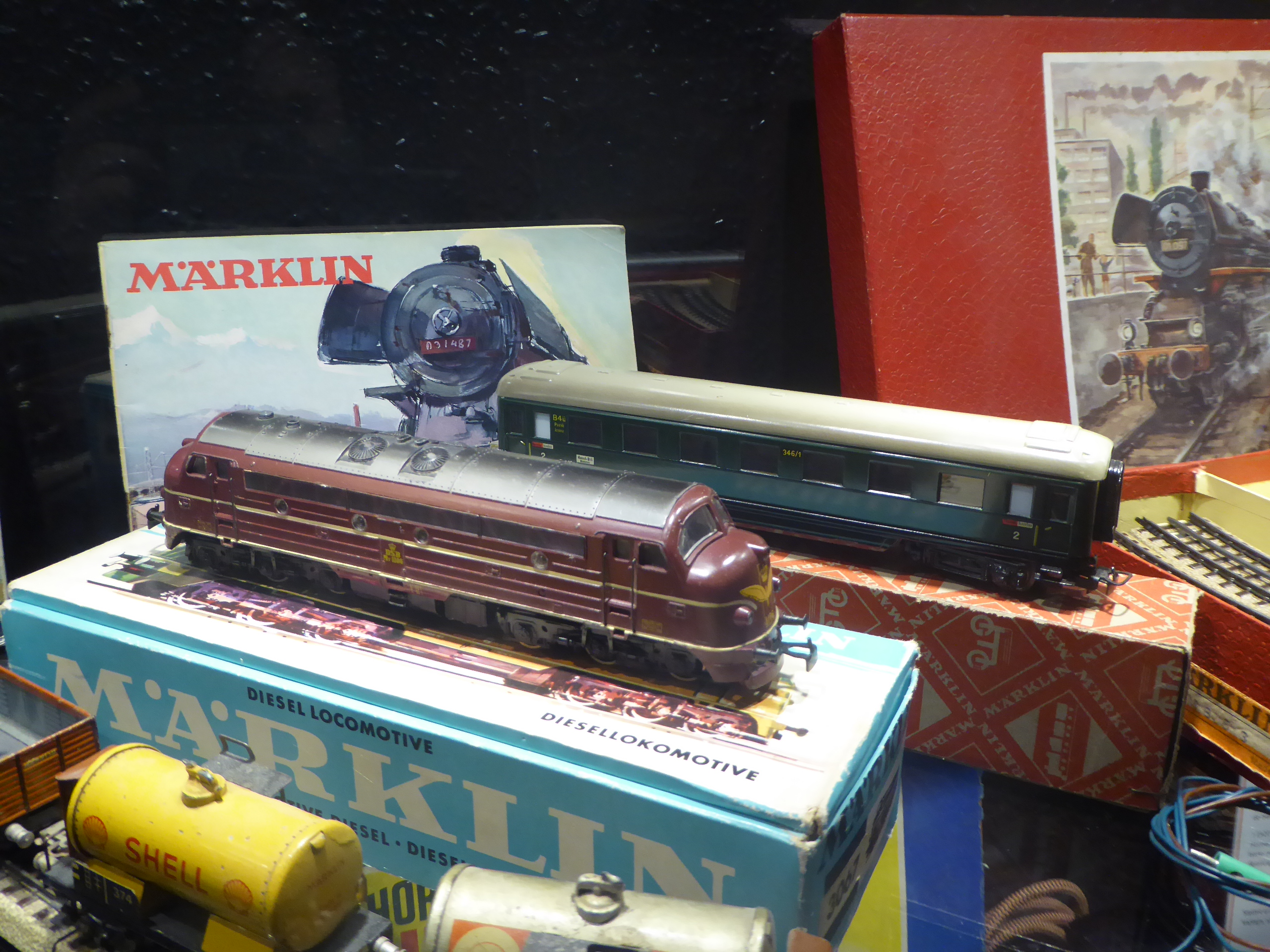
Märklin HO-scale MY model exhibited at the Danish Museum of Science and Technology.

Models of the class MY has been produced by numerous model railway manufacturers. In HO scale, models have been produced by Fleischmann, Heljan, Long, Märklin, NMJ, Piko and Roco. In TT, models have been made by Zeuke (later Tillig), in N by Kato and Minitrix, in Z by Märklin and in O by Heljan.

== See also ==
- List of DSB locomotives and multiple units
- Bulldog nose
- Similar locomotive classes in other European countries:
  - Class Di 3 of the Norwegian State Railways (NSB)
  - Class M61 of the Hungarian State Railways (MÁV)
  - Class 1600 of the Luxembourg Railways (CFL)
  - Class 52, 53 and 54 of the Belgian Railways (SNCB/NMBS)
