= Bulldog nose =

Nickname given to some GM-EMD locomotives

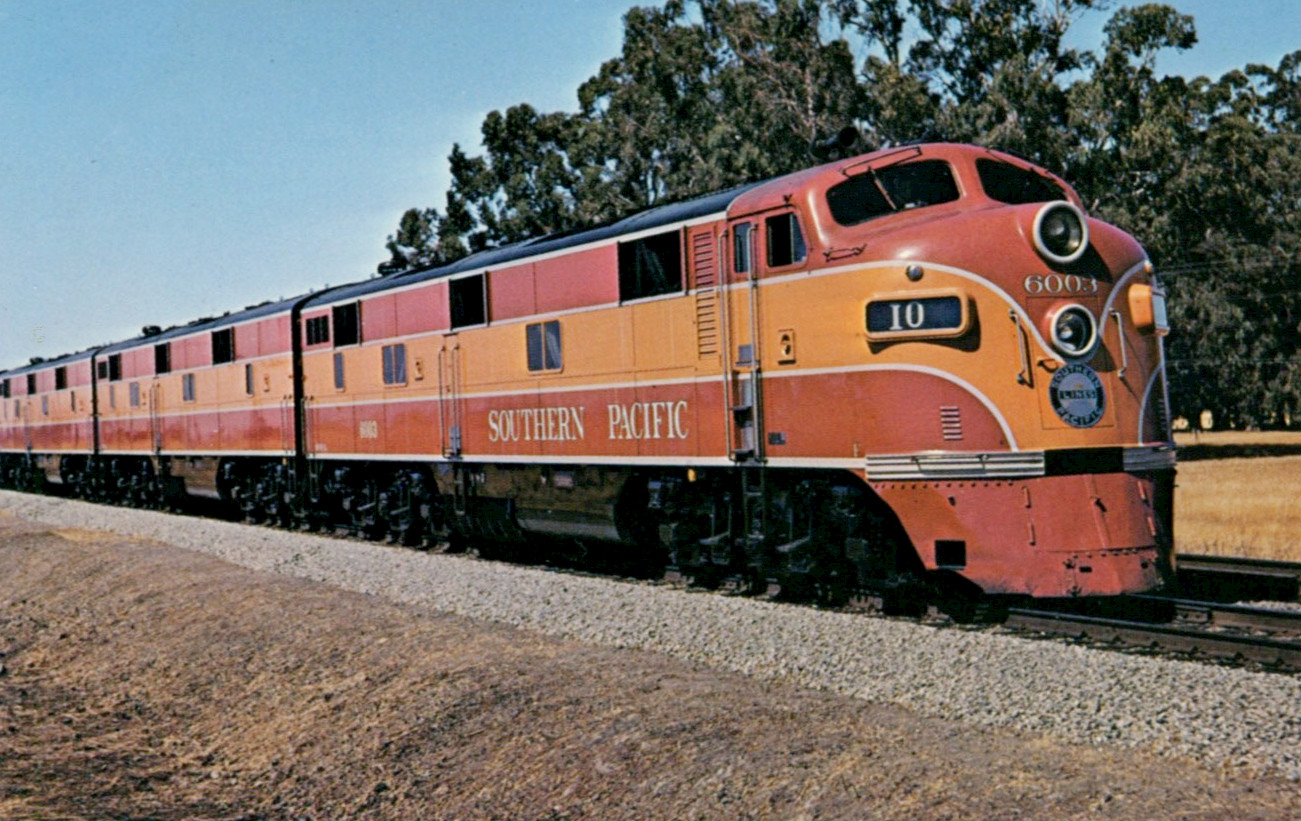
An EMD E7, one of the American "bulldog noses"

"Bulldog nose" is the nickname given, due to their appearance, to several cab-unit diesel-electric locomotives manufactured by GM-EMD and its licensees from 1939 to 1970. The term originated with EMD F-units, as well as later E-unit models such as the E7, E8, and E9. The bulldog nose design, which has been described as a "cultural icon", consists of two narrow front cab windows, swept back above a protruding nose section, usually with a prominent nose-top mounted headlight. This bore resemblance to a dog's face. It was a blunter and more vertical variation of the early "slant nose" style, which featured a more sloped front and often less protruding headlight. Examples of this included the EMC E1.

The style was highly influential in locomotive design internationally during the same period, with many diesel and electric locomotives in Europe and Australia among other places adopting similar styling during the 1940s, 50s, and 60s.

== Clyde Engineering derivatives ==
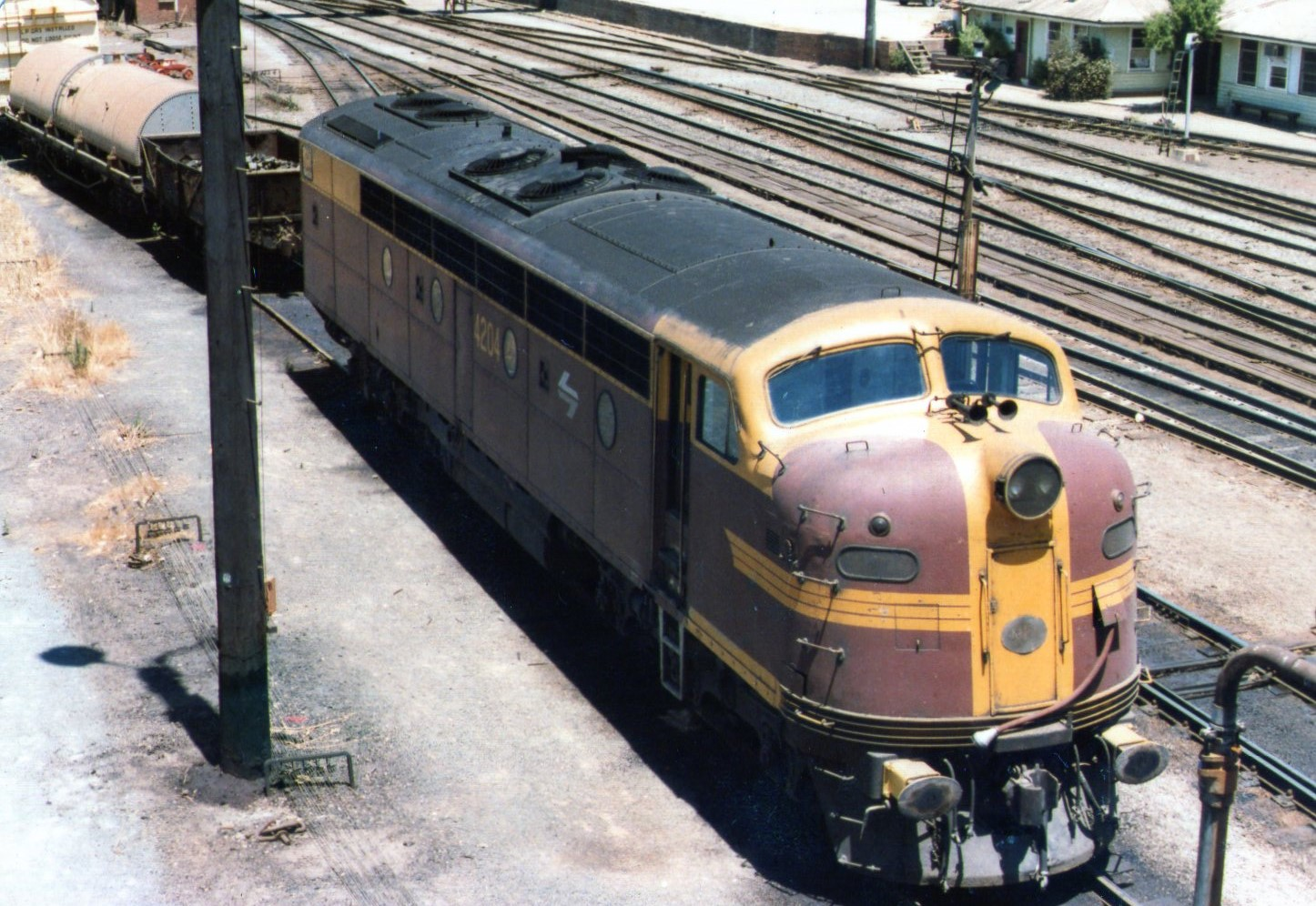
A New South Wales 42 class locomotive in Australia

In 1951, the EMD F7 series was modified by General Motors' Australian licence holder Clyde Engineering to fit Australian loading gauge and axle load constraints. The 1,500 hp (1,100 kW) A1A-A1A Clyde/EMD ML1 locomotive was introduced on the Commonwealth Railways as the GM class, as well as exported to Pakistan. It was further developed into the ML2 as a dual cab Co-Co locomotive, with a bulldog nose at each end, for Victorian Railways (VR), becoming that system's B class.

A single-nose variant of the design, the EMD A7, with the revised 1,800 hp (1,300 kW) EMD 567C series engine, was introduced as the New South Wales Government Railways (NSWGR) 42 class, the VR S class, and an upgraded GM class. The design continued to be developed with the dual-cab EMD AJ16C, introduced on NSWGR as the 421 class, although, unlike the earlier ML2, the bulldog nose was only used on one end of the locomotives.

1970 saw the introduction of the last new locomotive design in the world to utilise the F-series bulldog nose, the 3,000 hp (2,200 kW) EMD AT26C, designated by the Commonwealth Railways as the CL class. A final Australian iteration of the bulldog nose in Australian locomotive practice was the rebuild of the 30-year-old Victorian ML2 units into the EMD AAT22C-2R, designated as the V/Line A class.

== The NOHAB bulldog ==
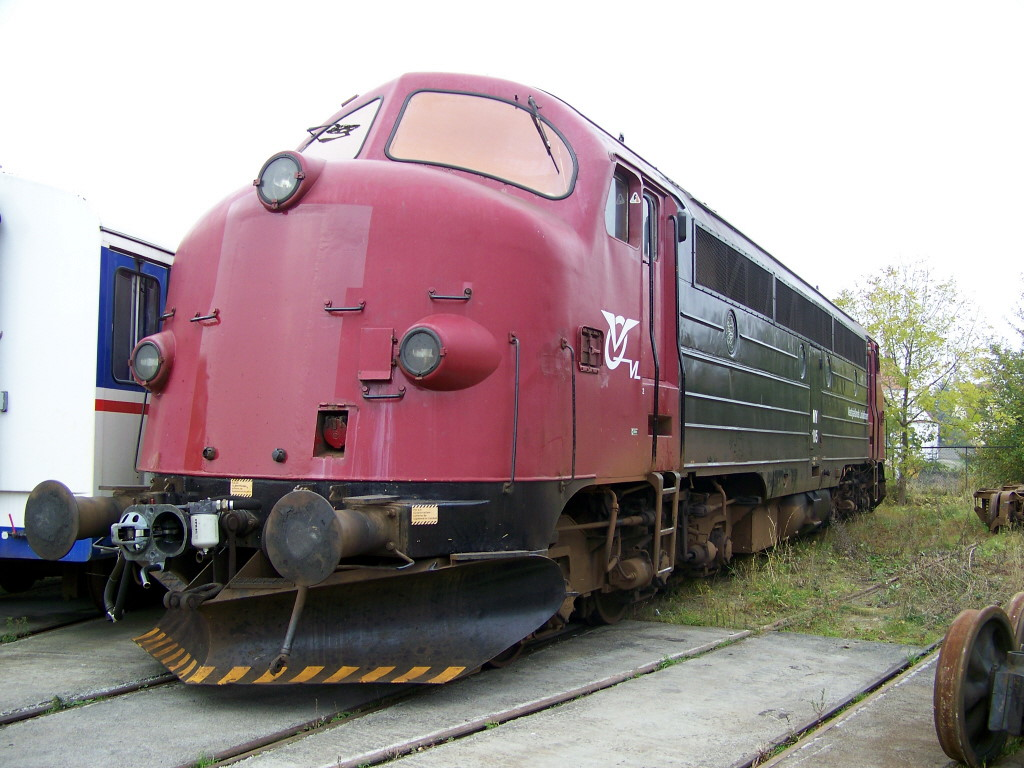
Danske Statsbaner Class MY

There were also a number of European "bulldog nose" locomotive classes, all of which were built by NOHAB or AFB (with license from EMD), also frequently referred to as "round noses". These were effectively Clyde's ML2 design modified to meet European clearance standards, and had a lower nose and deeper cab windows.

The NOHAB-built classes include the DSB's class MY/MV and MX, the NSB's class D i3 and the MÁV class M61; NOHAB's design was later used by AFB, which built the NMBS/SNCB's class 52-54 and the CFL's class 1600.

== The Henschel und Sohn Bulldog ==
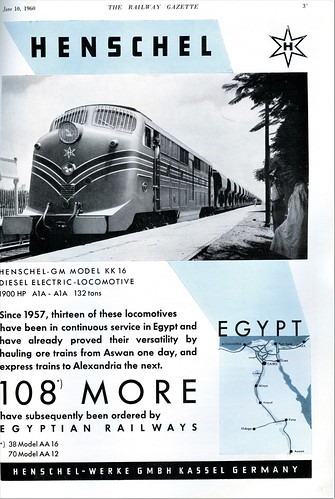
Publication of Henschel und Sohn GM Derivates

In October 1953 Henschel und Sohn of Kassel, Germany, joined the club of GM-EMD associates in Europe. Henschel und Sohn designed their version of a twin Cab Mainline Diesel locomotive for the Egyptian and Ghana Railways. Henschel produced AA12, TT12, AA16 and KK16 versions with Buffer and standard coupler. The ENR received 121 Locomotives, the Ghana State Railways received 18 Locomotives.

== Other such locomotives ==
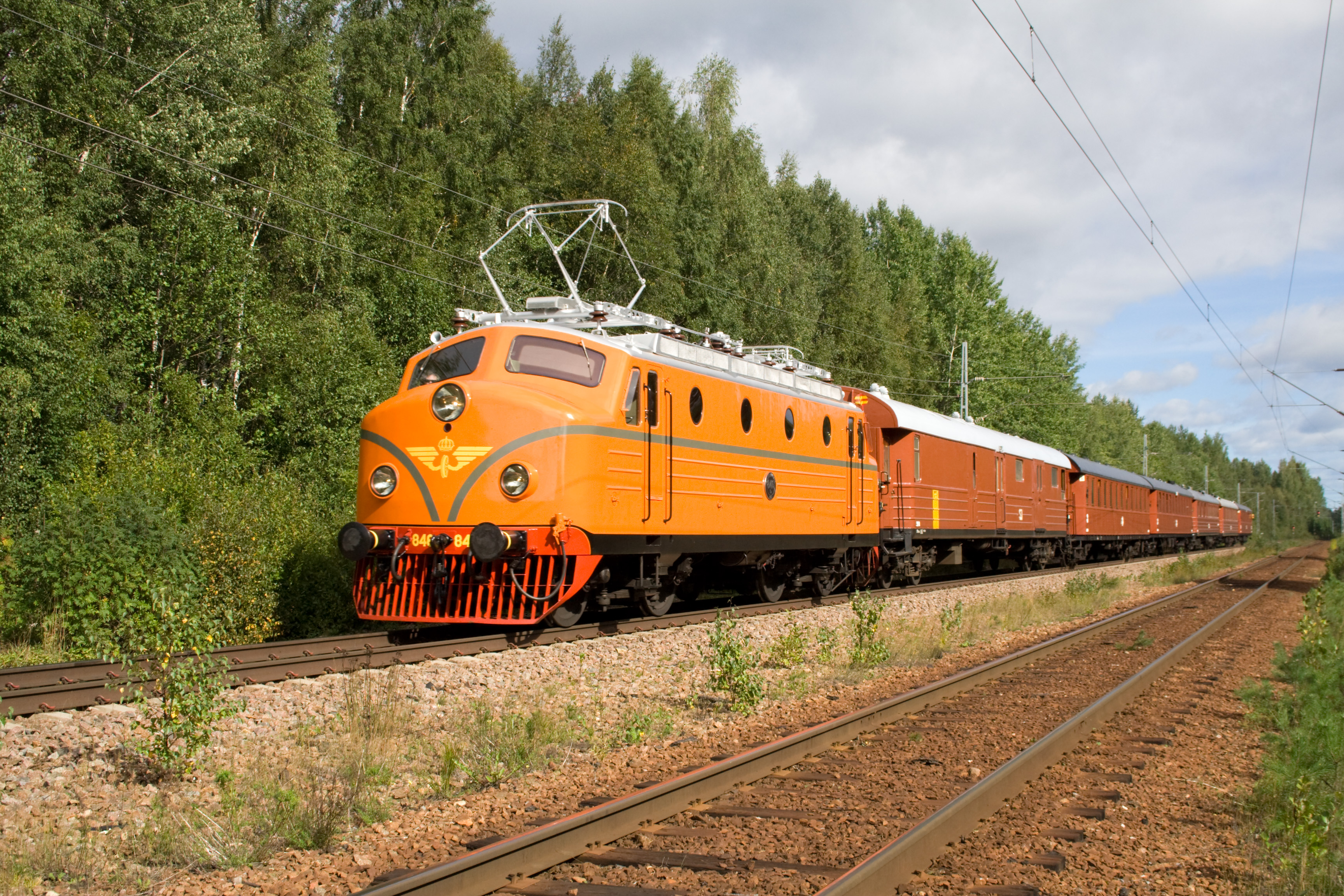
Statens Järnvägar Ra 988

The SJ Class Ra (or Rapid) is an electric locomotive operated until 1996 by Statens Järnvägar of Sweden. Ten units were built by ASEA, two in 1955 and eight in 1961. Ra was used on express trains until the 1990s. In India, the railways used electric locomotives in the WCM series on its DC electricity lines in Maharashtra. WCM locomotives type 1 to 5 had bulldog noses. Type 6 had a different style. In the United Kingdom, the British Rail Class 55 'Deltic' diesels incorporated this design during their service between 1961 and 1981.
