= SJ Ra =

Ra
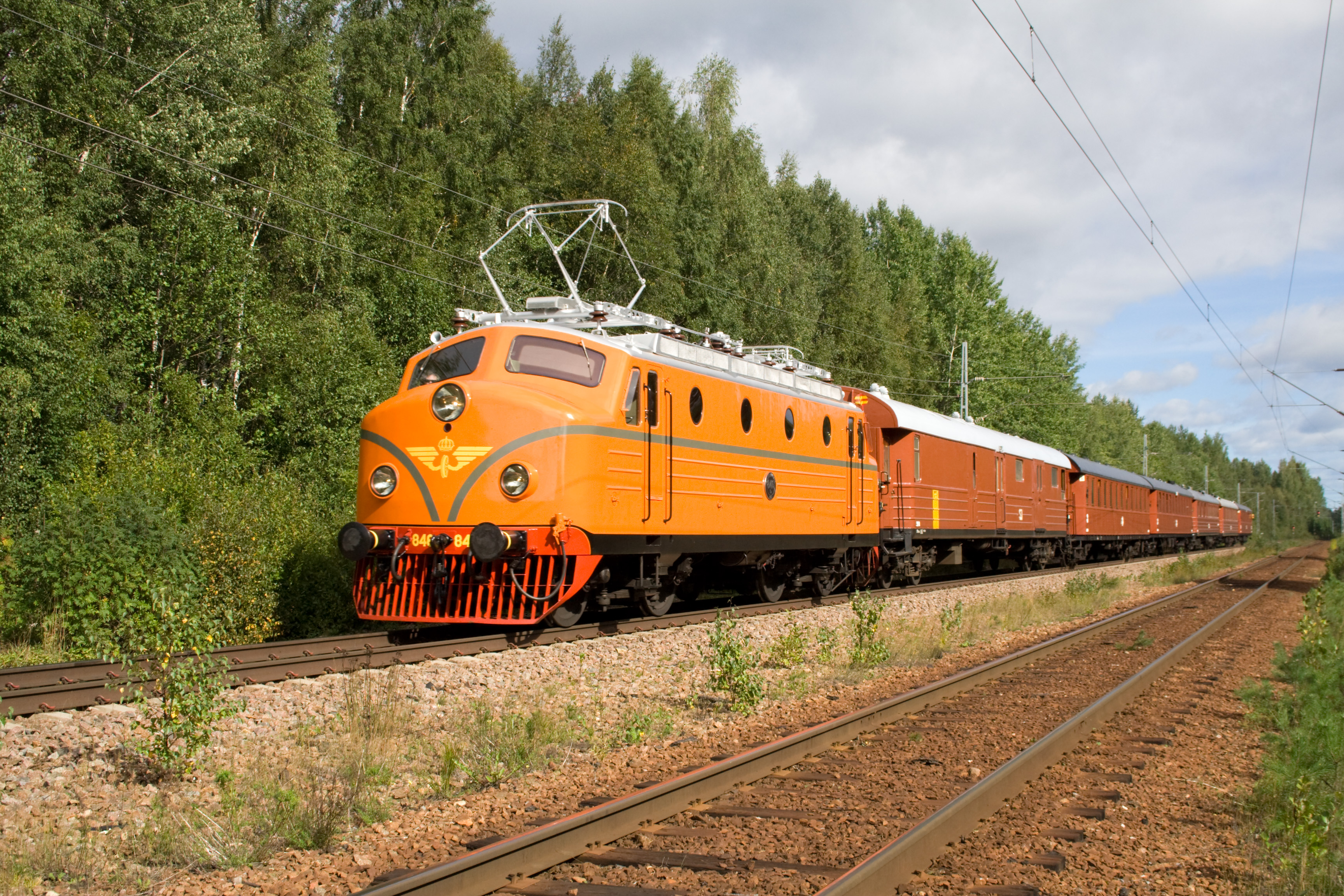
- Rapid 846 at the Swedish Railway Museum
Type and origin
- Power type: Electric
- Builder: ASEA
- Build date: 1955, 1961
- Total produced: 10
Specifications
- Configuration
  - UIC: Bo′Bo′
- Gauge: 1,435 mm (4 ft 8 1/2 in)
- Length: 15,100 mm (49 ft 6 1/2 in)
- Loco weight: 65 t (64 long tons; 72 short tons)
- Electric system/s: 15 kV 16 2/3 Hz AC Catenary
- Current pickup: Pantograph
Performance figures
- Maximum speed: 150 km/h (93 mph)
- Power output: 2,640 kW (3,540 hp)
- Tractive effort: 200 kN (45,000 lb_{f})
Career
- Operators: Statens Järnvägar
- Numbers: 846-847; 987-994
- Retired: 1996

The SJ Class Ra (or Rapid) is an electric locomotive operated by Swedish State Railways (Swedish: Statens Järnvägar, SJ). Ten units were built by ASEA, two in 1955 and eight in 1961. Ra was used on express trains until the 1990s.

== History ==
During the 1940s SJ had a need for lighter and quicker locomotives for their express trains. In 1953 two bogie-locomotives were ordered from ASEA. Inspiration for the appearance came from North America, with round shapes and a bulldog nose. The two first units were successful and SJ ordered additional eight units from ASEA, delivered in 1961. The Ra name follows SJs standard naming practices where "R" stands for a fast electric locomotive and the "a" denotes that its the first variation of the series.

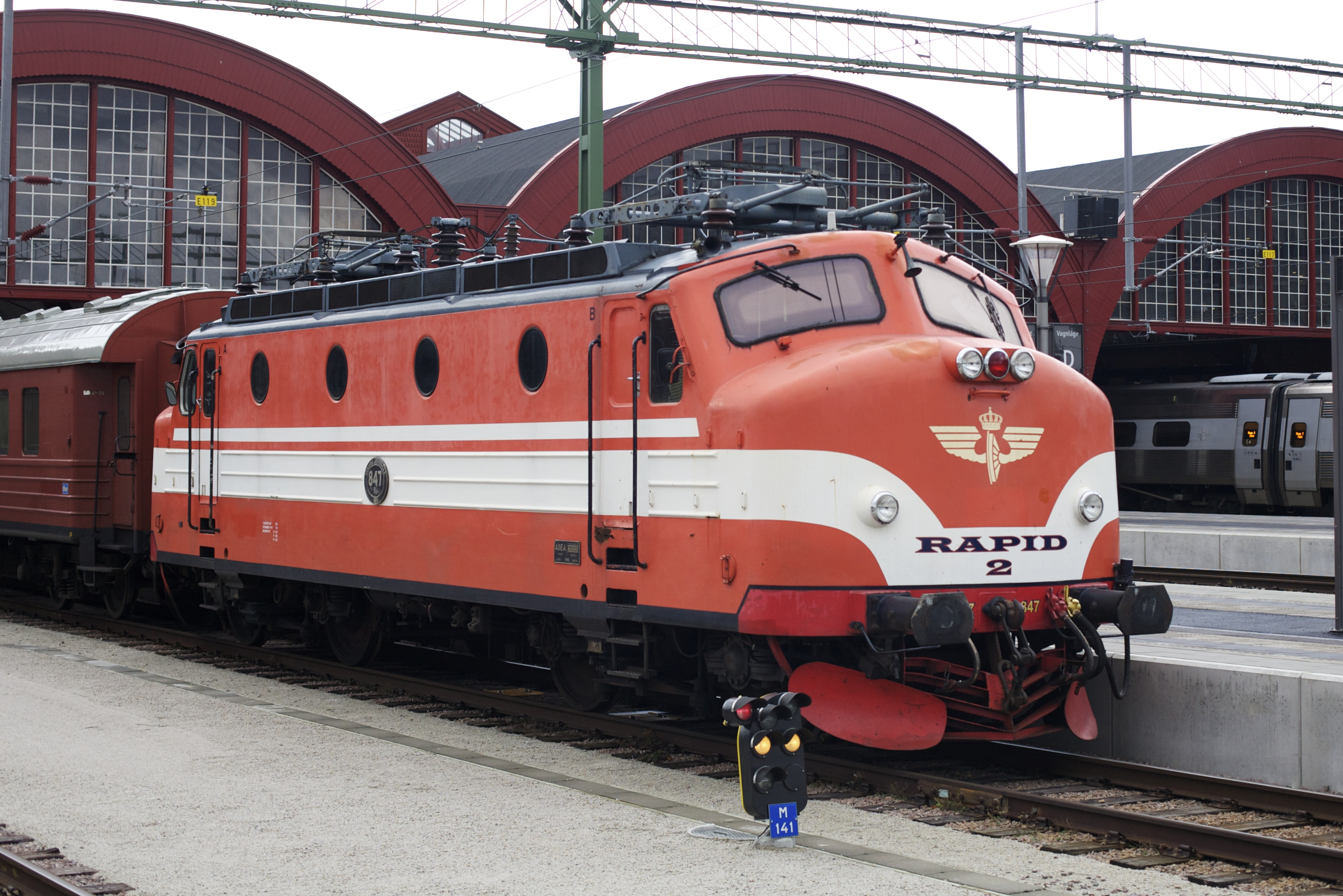

They were capable of 150 km/h service but never reached more than 130 km/h in revenue service, mainly on the Stockholm - Göteborg line and Stockholm - Oslo line. During the 70s and 80s they were replaced on faster routes by newer locomotives such as the Rc series. The last two trains left the fleet in 1996, in their later years they mainly pulled exposition trains, for example before the Swedish EU membership referendum in 1994. Three have been preserved, one (Ra 846) at the Swedish Railway Museum, one (Ra 987) at Nässjö Railway Museum and one (Ra 994) at Stockholms Kultursällskap för ånga och järnväg. In 2012 the Swedish Railway Museum sold one unit (Ra 988) to Svensk Tågkraft and is as of 2026 still in active service and is mostly used to pull leaf-clearing trains.
