= NSB Di 3 =

Class of diesel–electric locomotives

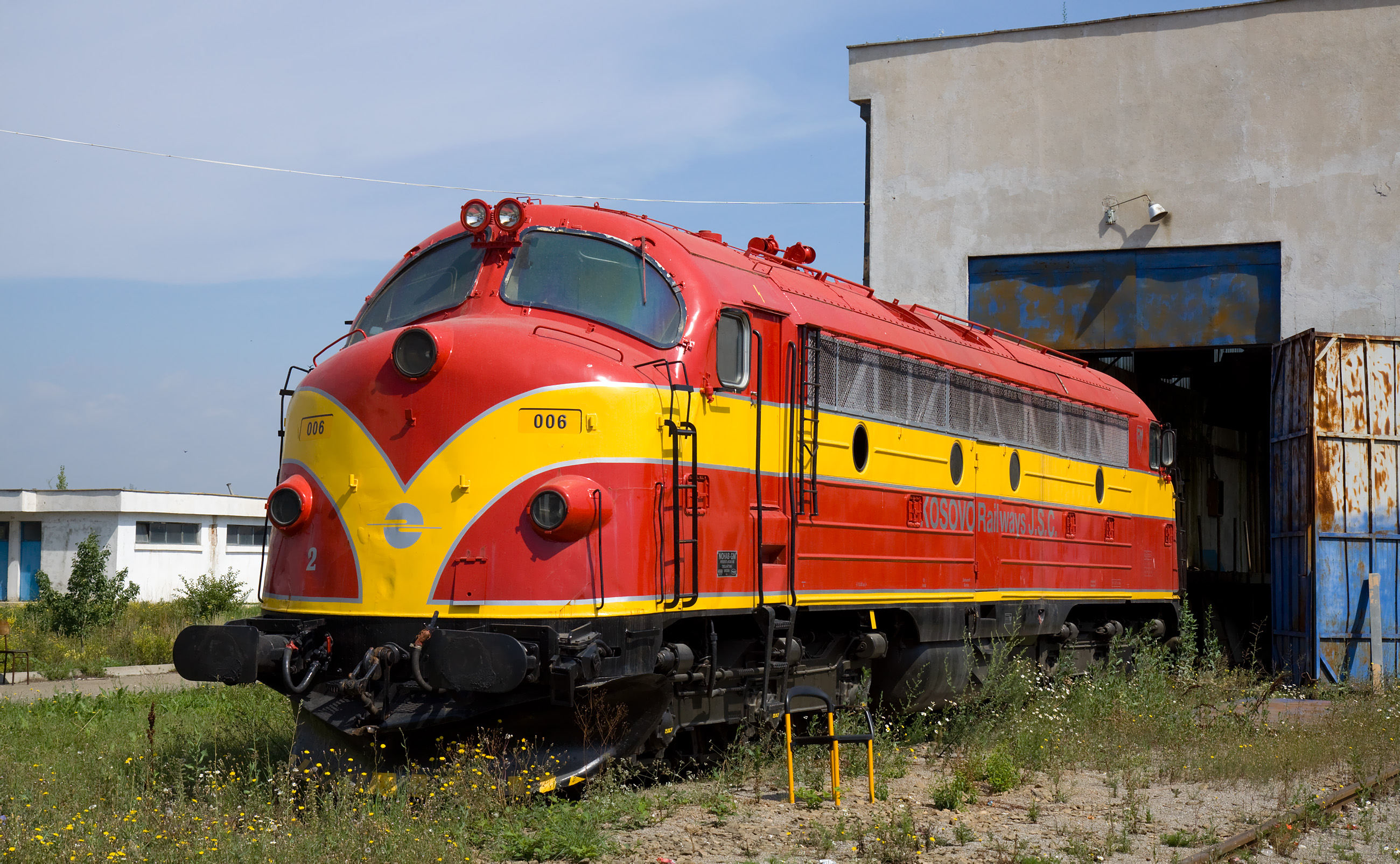
- HK NOHAB Di 3 006 of the Kosovo Railways
Type and origin
- Power type: Diesel–electric
- Builder: Nydqvist och Holm
- Build date: 1954–1969
Specifications
- Configuration
  - UIC: Co′Co′ (a-series); (A1A)(A1A) (b-series)
- Gauge: 1,435 mm (4 ft 8 1/2 in)
- Wheel diameter: 1,016 mm (40 in)
- Length: 18.6 m (61 ft 0 in) (a-series); 18.9 m (62 ft 0 in) (b-series)
- Loco weight: 102 t (100 long tons; 112 short tons) (a-series); 103 t (101 long tons; 114 short tons) (b-series)
- Prime mover: EMD 567
- Cylinders: 16
- Transmission: Electric
Performance figures
- Maximum speed: 105 km/h (65 mph) (a-series); 146 km/h (91 mph) (b-series)
- Power output: 1,305 kW (1,750 hp)
- Tractive effort: 265 kN (60,000 lb_{f}) (a-series); 176.5 kN (39,700 lb_{f}) (b-series)
Career
- Operators: Inlandsbanan AB; Kosovo Railways; Norwegian State Railways; Ofotbanen AS; Skandinaviska Jernbanor
- Number in class: 35
- Numbers: 3 602 – 3 633; 3 641 – 3 643

NSB Di 3 is a class of 35 diesel–electric locomotives built by NOHAB for the Norwegian State Railways (NSB). The class was built between 1954 and 1969, and delivered in two series, Di 3a and Di 3b. They are based on the Electro-Motive Division F7 and are equipped with EMD 567 engines. They have a distinct bulldog nose and were numbered 602–633 (a-series) and 641–643 (b-series). The locomotives had a prime mover that gives a power output of 1,305 kilowatts (1,750 hp). The a-series has a Co′Co′ wheel arrangement, while the b-series has (A1A)(A1A). The b-series has higher top speed, but lower tractive effort.

The class was the dominant locomotive on NSB's unelectrified lines. It was ordered as part of the company's dieselization of services during the 1950s and 1960s, and was initially used on the three mainline routes of the Bergen, Dovre and Nordland Lines. In the 1960s the Bergen and Dovre Lines were electrified and the Di 3 units transferred to smaller lines, such as the Meråker, Valdres, Røros, Solør and Rauma Lines. They remained in service with NSB until 2001, five years later than planned due to NSB returning their successor, the Di 6. The units are still in use by the private operator Ofotbanen, the Kosovo Railways, an operator in Sicily, and the Norwegian Railway Museum. The class is similar to the DSB Class MY, NMBS Class 52–54, CFL Class 1600 and MÁV M61.

== Construction ==
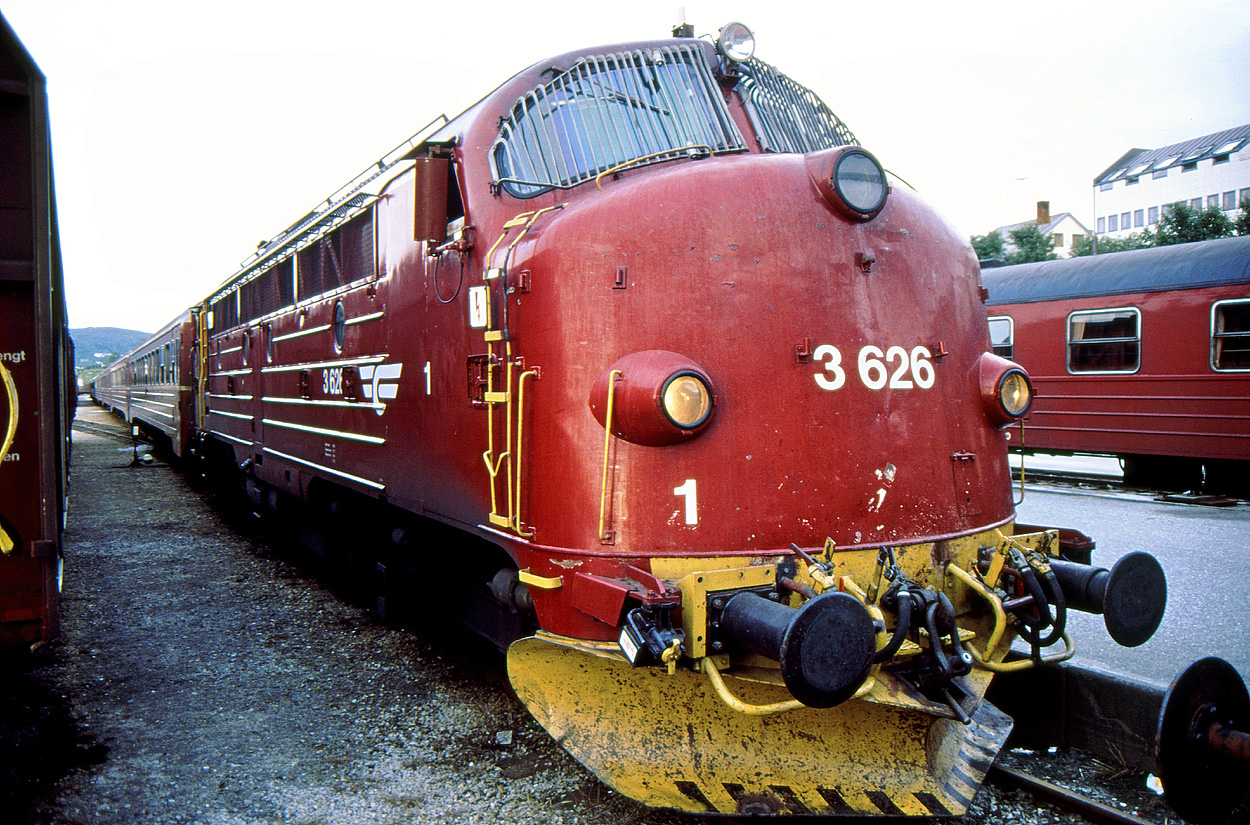
Di 3.626 at Bodø Station in 1991

The first diesel locomotive used by NSB was a single Di 1 unit delivered in 1942. It was more cost-efficient than the steam locomotives used on the non-electrified lines, and in 1945, NSB decided that it would not order more steam locomotives. General Motors' Electro Motive Division (EMD) made a bid to deliver twelve units based on their F7, and NSB agreed to lease a single unit for trial. The body and mechanical components were built by NOHAB, the motors by ASEA and prime mover by EMD. While under production in 1954, GM shipped a G12 for trial in Norway and Sweden. It was tested on the express train on the Dovre Line on 7 August, but proved to have insufficient power, causing the train to be 20 minutes late.

The trial unit from NOHAB was delivered on 17 September 1954. The first test runs in scheduled service were on the Nordland Line between Trondheim and Mo i Rana in October. There were no technical faults until 22 December, when a ground fault caused the locomotive to be out of service until 17 January. In March the unit was sent back to NOHAB and went on a marketing tour that would eventually reach Ankara, Turkey in 1955.

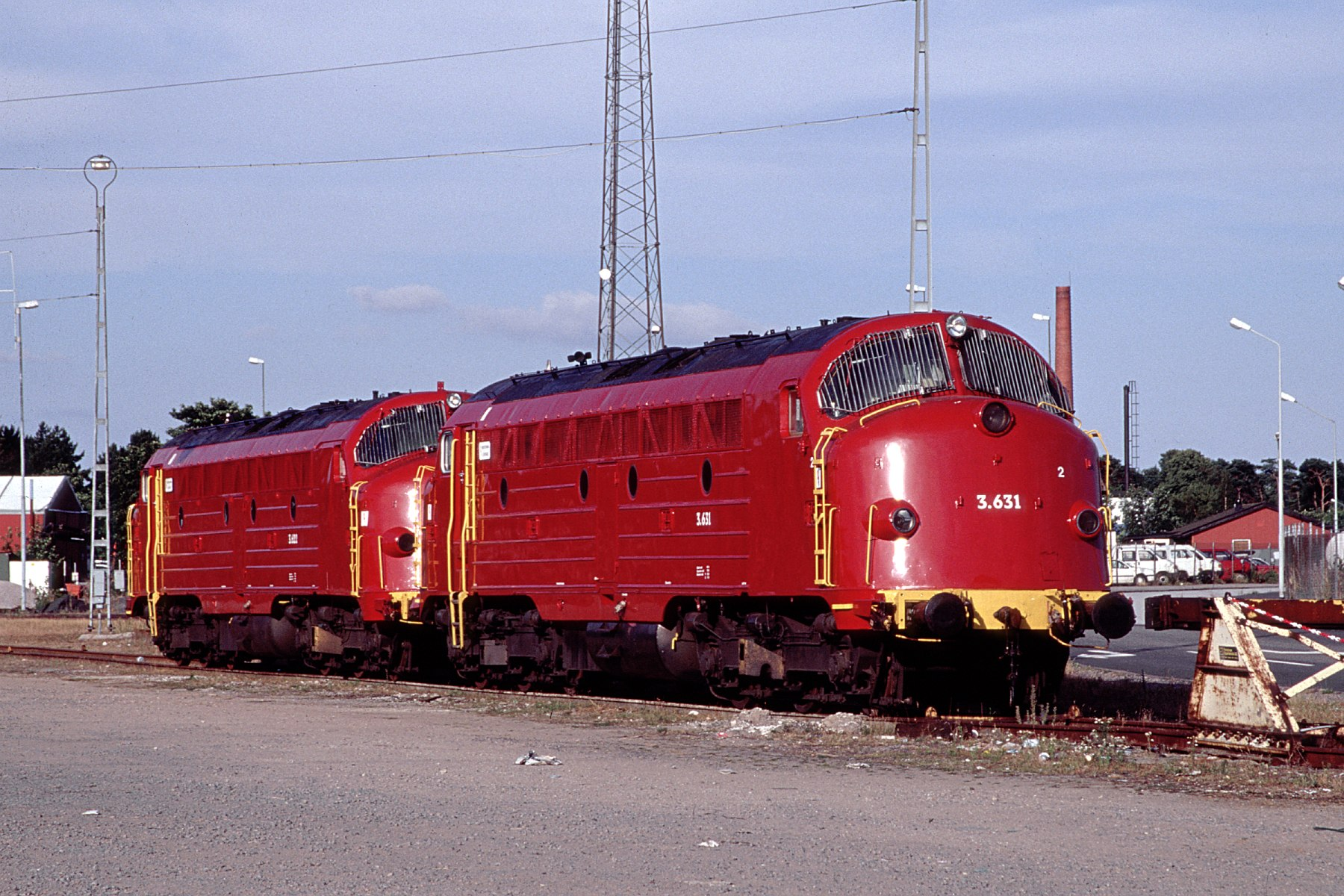
Two Di 3 units in NSB "Nydesign"

The locomotive returned to Norway on 1 July 1955, where it was numbered 602 and put into service on the Nordland Line. The trials were successful, with much higher regularity than the steam locomotives. The Di 3 was used eight days in a row, and then spent a single day in the depot. NSB signed an agreement with NOHAB for delivery of five further locomotives. This caused a public debate, because the domestic supplier Thune had offered to build a similar locomotive in cooperation with American Locomotive Company. The first delivery was made on 25 April 1957, and the order completed by July. In March 1957 NSB received permission to buy another eight locomotives. Delivery started in October and was completed on 1 June 1958. The order was supplemented with another six trains, with delivery in 1958.

The Finnish State Railways (VR) ordered five units in 1959, but these were cancelled for political reasons. The units were offered to NSB for a reduced price. Three were designated Di 3b because they had a slight specification variation, with a (A1A)'(A1A)' wheel arrangement and higher top speed. Two units had come short enough in the production process that they could be given the same specifications as the other Di 3a units, but received a slightly longer body. The Di 3b were given the numbers 641–643. For part of 1960, no. 623 was leased by NOHAB and sent on a demonstration tour in Eastern Europe. This resulted in an order from the Hungarian State Railways, where it became the MAV M61. The Røros Line was upgraded and the Bergen Line units transferred to Trondheim in 1960, but increased need for hauling forced NSB to not use the units on the Røros Line until the delivery of the next batch of six units in 1965. The final delivery, of four units, was made in 1969.

== Operation ==
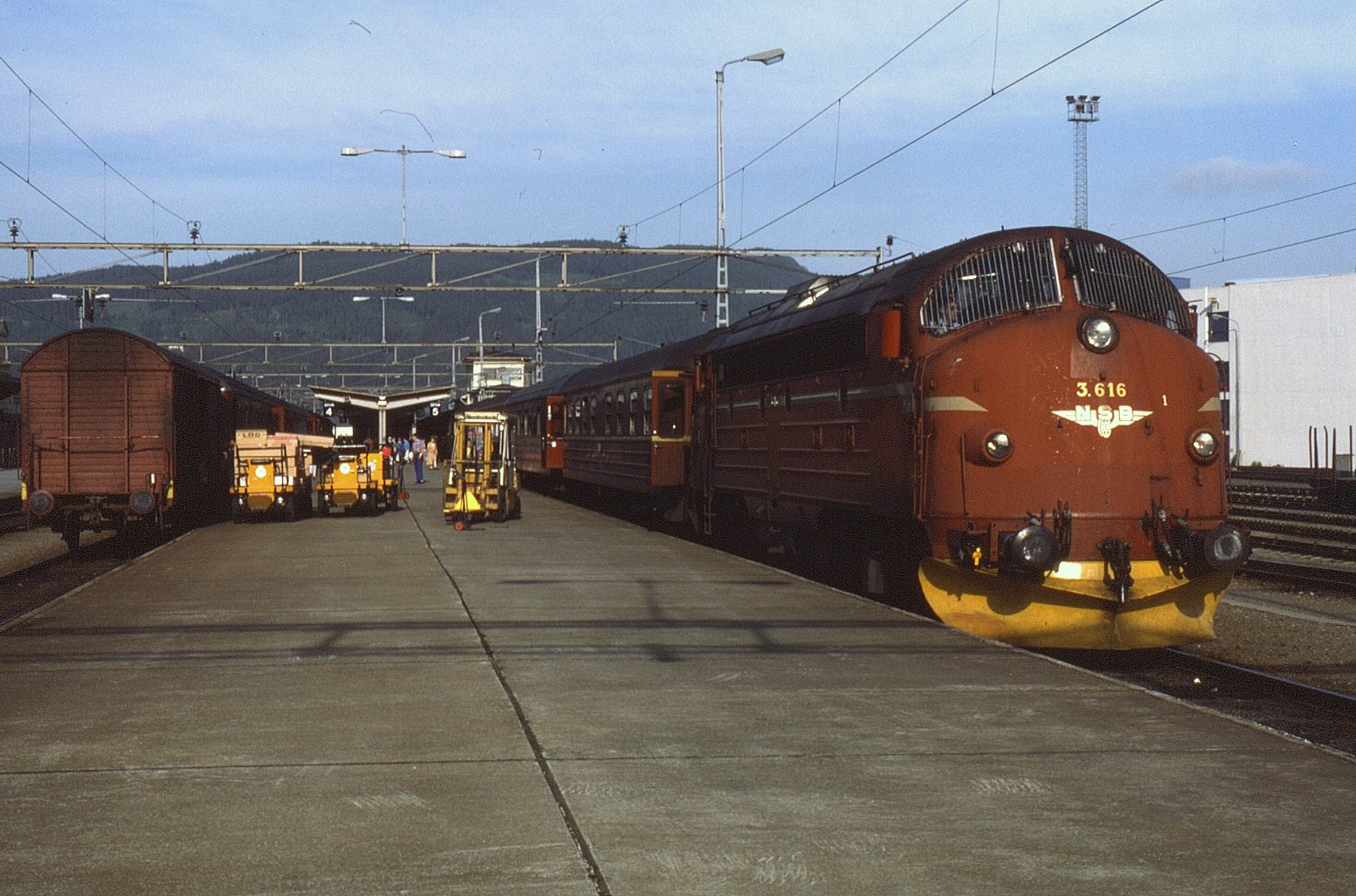
NSB Di 3.616 at Trondheim Central Station preparing for departure on the express train on the Nordland Line in 1986

The initial use for the Di 3 was to operate the three non-electrified long-distance lines of NSB: the Bergen Line, the Dovre Line and the Nordland Line. Following the delivery of the first batch in 1957, they were from 2 June used on the Dovre Line, north of Otta to Trondheim, and further north along the Nordland Line to Mo i Rana. The stock was sufficient to replace all steam locomotives on the Nordland Line, and reduced travel time by one hour. From Hamar to Otta, the track did not have sufficient permitted axle load. From the second batch of eight units, five were put into service on the Bergen Line, the rest on the Dovre and Nordland Lines. Necessary upgrades of the permitted axle load had been made to the Dovre Line and Nordland Line, and the locomotives were in use from Hamar Station to Saltdal. On 30 November, the Nordland Line was completed to Fauske, and the full length operated with Di 3.

The first section of the Bergen Line, the Gjøvik Line and the Roa–Hønefoss Line, was electrified in February 1961. This allowed diesel and electric locomotives to haul all trains from Oslo to Bergen. In 1962 the Nordland Line was completed to Bodø Station, but the increased need for locomotives was more than compensated by the electrification of the Bergen Line being extended to Ål Station. The first Di 3 ran on the Røros Line in 1964, that had previously been denied due to bridges with insufficient axle load permits. In 1965, the Bergen Line was electrified, and all but one Di 3 was transferred to Trondheim. A single unit, usually no. 610, was stationed at Finse Station as a snowplow. Along with additional deliveries, there were sufficient Di 3 units to terminate most steam operations.

After the Bergen Line was electrified, the work continued on the Dovre Line. The section from Hamar to Otta was finished in 1967, and the following year to Dombås Station. This allowed the locomotives to be transferred to secondary lines. With the final delivery of the last units in 1969 and the completion of the electrification of the Dovre Line in 1970, the final steam locomotive was taken out of service. During the last half of the 1960s, the Di 3 was put into service on the Rauma Line, the Røros Line, the Solør Line, the Valdres Line and the Meråker Line.

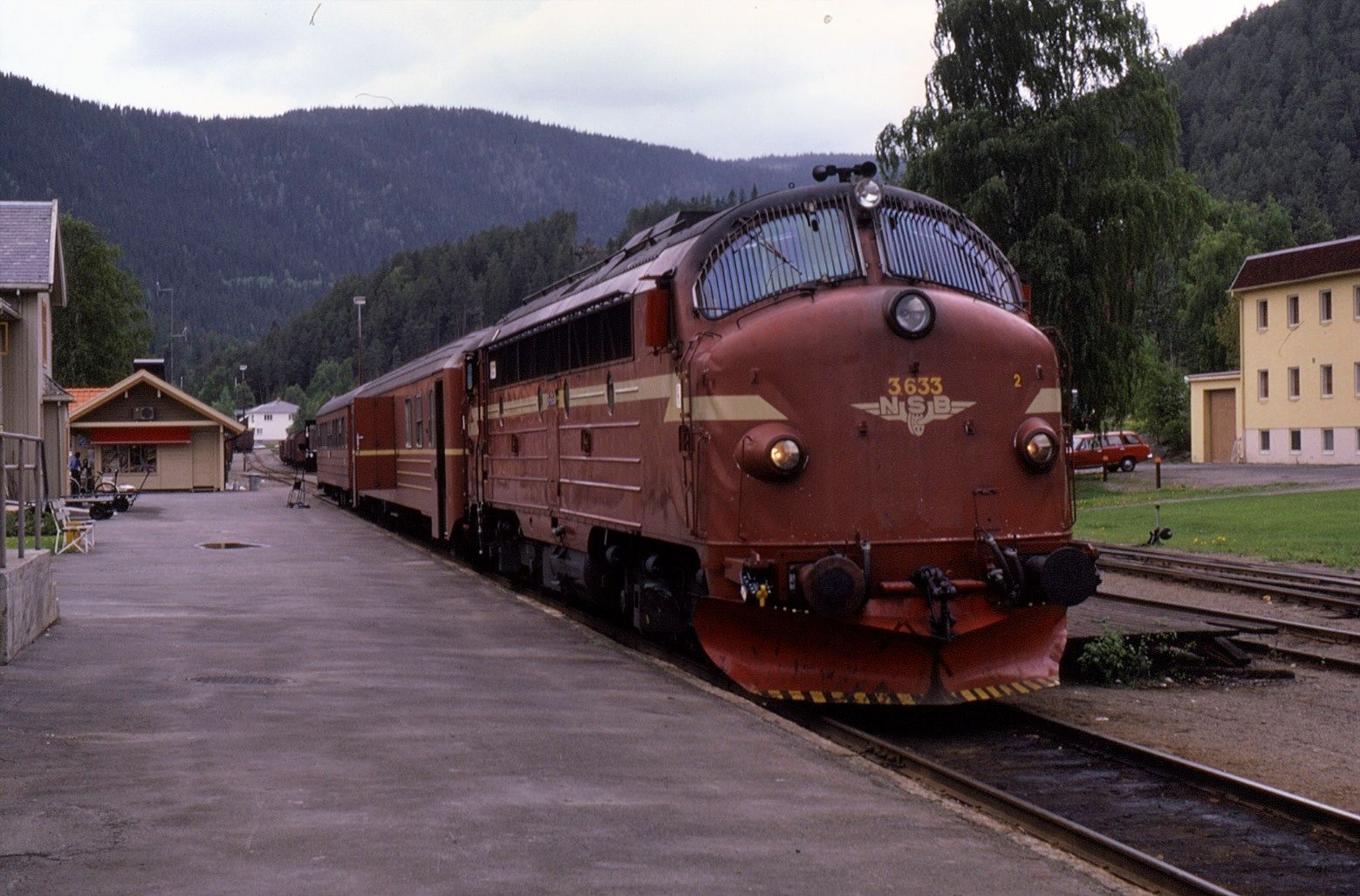
NSB Di 3.633 at Fagernes Station in 1986

In November 1970, the Dovre Line was electrified, and the last steam locomotives were retired. A long-term plan to electrify half the lines was finished, and for two decades, NSB's operations were very stable with no major investments to infrastructure or closing of lines. NSB had slightly fewer diesel locomotives than they needed, but plans to order additional Di 3 was never fulfilled. In 1981, NSB took delivery of five Di 4 to supplement the older units. They were mainly used on the Nordland Line, and Di 3 units were predominantly used on the other lines, although they continued to operate som trains on the Nordland Line. On 1 April 1987, a Di 3 612 caught on fire; the damage was small enough that it could have been repaired, but NSB instead decided to put aside the unit. At the time NSB planned to order additional Di 4, but these plans were put on hold. In 1988, the Valdres Line was closed; this was the only time a line with Di 3 in regular service was closed.

During the 1980s, NSB started leasing SJ T44-locomotives from Sweden to supplement the Di 3. In 1992, the decision was made to order 12 Di 6 and 20 Di 8 to replace the Di 3. The former was based on the Di 4 and had twice the power of the Di 3. The Di 8 was slightly more powerful than the Di 3, and were intended for freight trains. Both series were put into service in 1996, but the Di 6 proved to have so many technical problems that they were returned to Siemens in 1998. The Di 3 units had been set aside and some had been scrapped, but the return of the Di 6 forced NSB to put the units back into service.

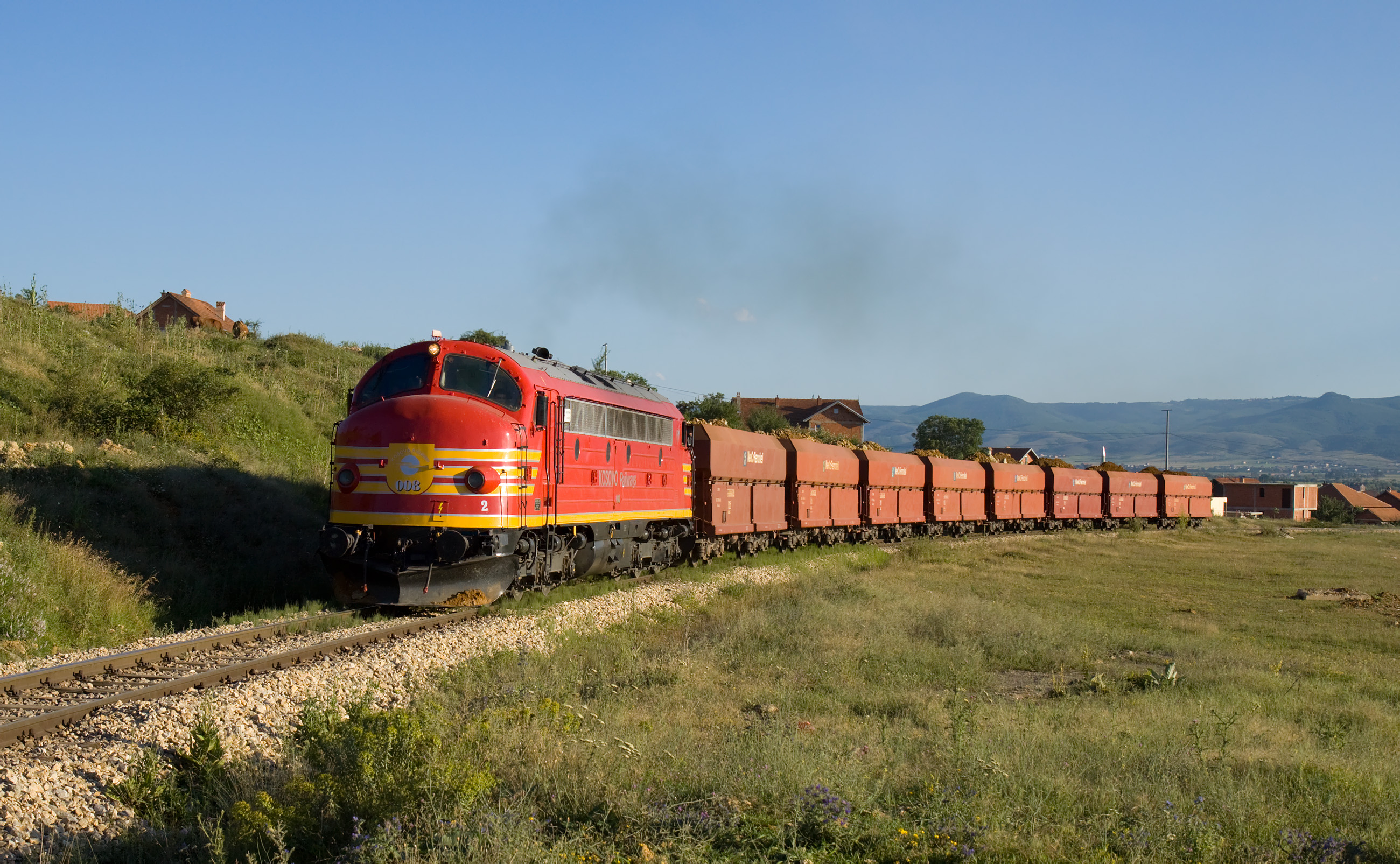
An ore train of the Kosovo Railways being hauled by no. 008

During the mid-1990s, NSB had initiated a program to replace the traditional locomotive and carriage trains with new, tilting multiple units. This had led to the order of sixteen Class 73 four-car units for the three mainline routes on the Bergen Line, Dovre Line and Sørland Line. To supplement this, the board of NSB decided on 14 November 1996 to purchase seven tilting diesel multiple units for the Røros and Rauma Lines. The choice fell on Class 93, with fifteen units eventually delivered. This allowed all passenger trains on diselized lines to either be operated with Class 93 be hauled by the Di 4. The last Di 3-hauled train ran on 7 January 2001.

=== Post-NSB ===
With the delivery of Class 93, NSB started to retire or sell the Di 3. In November 2001, five units were sold for NOK 250,000 each—well under market price—to the new private operator Ofotbanen. The purchase raised controversy, because the potential operator Banetransport had offered full market price for the trains. One year after delivery, six of eleven Class 93-locomotives were out of order. To solve the problem, NSB had to rent back used Di 3 locomotives from Ofotbanen. NSB had chosen to sell the old locomotives for less than market price, but Ofotbanen demanded that NSB pay the entire purchase price for the short-term rental back.

Four units (619, 633, 641 and 643) were sold to the United Nations and was put into service in Kosovo, in what has since become the Kosovo Railways. Four units (622, 626, 630 and 631) were sold to an operator in Sicily, Italy. The Norwegian National Rail Administration bought one unit (628) for maintenance, and has painted it yellow. The Norwegian Railway Museum in Hamar has preserved four units (602, 615, 616 and 642), of which two (602 and 616) were operated by GM-Gruppen and one (615) is kept for spare parts. NSB has kept one unit as reserve at Ål Station. The remaining units have been scrapped, put aside or sold as spare part units.

== Specifications ==
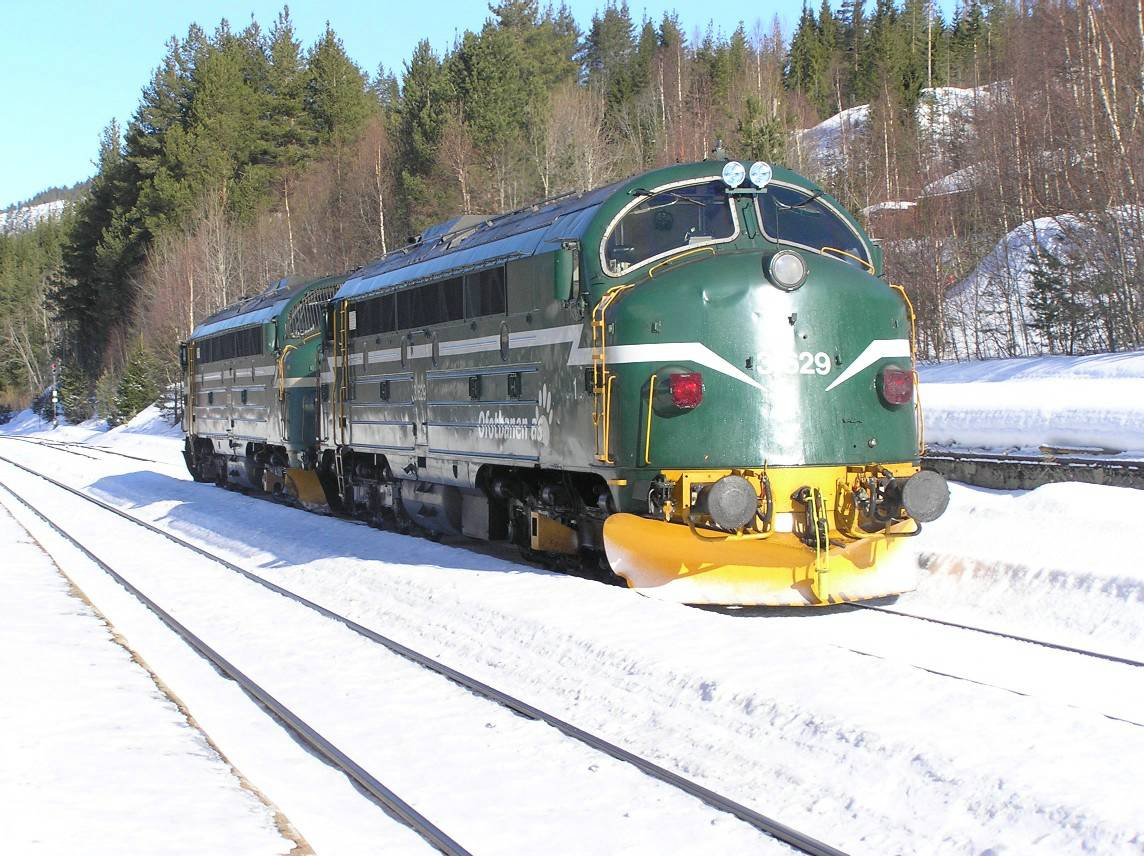
Two Di 3 units Ofotbanen design

The Di 3 was built by Nydquist och Holm of Trollhättan, Sweden, as part of a series of GM EMD AA16 locomotives in Europe. They are technically similar to the DSB Class MY of Denmark and the MAV M61 of Hungary. The locomotives are powered by a 16-cylinder EMD 16.567 C or E engine that has a power output of 1,305 kilowatts (1,750 horsepower) at 835 revolutions per minute (rpm). The engines power an EMD D32 or D12 generator that feeds six ASEA LJB76 or LJB84 motors on a Di 3a. The Di 3b is equipped with four EMD D40 or D77B motors. This gives a tractive effort of 265 kilonewtons (60,000 lb_{f}) for the a-series and 176.5 kilonewtons (39,700 pounds-force) for the b-series. The motors have a power output of 1,100 kilowatts (1,500 horsepower). The maximum speed is 105 kilometres per hour (65 mph) for the a-series and 143 kilometres per hour (89 miles per hour) for the b-series.

The steel bodies are 18.60 or 18.90 metres (61.0 or 62.0 ft) long. The longer length is for the three b-series units and the two a-series locomotives that were made in the batch, originally intended for VR. The a-series has a Co'Co' wheel arrangement, while the b-series has a (A1A)'(A1A)' arrangement, where the center of the three axles on each bogie is unpowered. The wheels have a 1,016 millimetres (3 ft 4.0 in) wheel diameter and the locomotives have a weight of 102.0 tonnes (100.4 long tons; 112.4 short tons) for the a-series and 103.0 tonnes (101.4 long tons; 113.5 short tons) for the b-series. The trains can be run in multiple with the Di 4, Di 6 and Di 8. All the Di 3 engines featured a bulldog nose, the only locomotive type in Norway to do so. The locomotives were at first delivered in a dark green livery, but during the 1960s this was changed to red, and the last delivered units never had a green scheme.
