= Belgian Railways Class 54 =

Class of Belgian diesel locomotives

Series 54
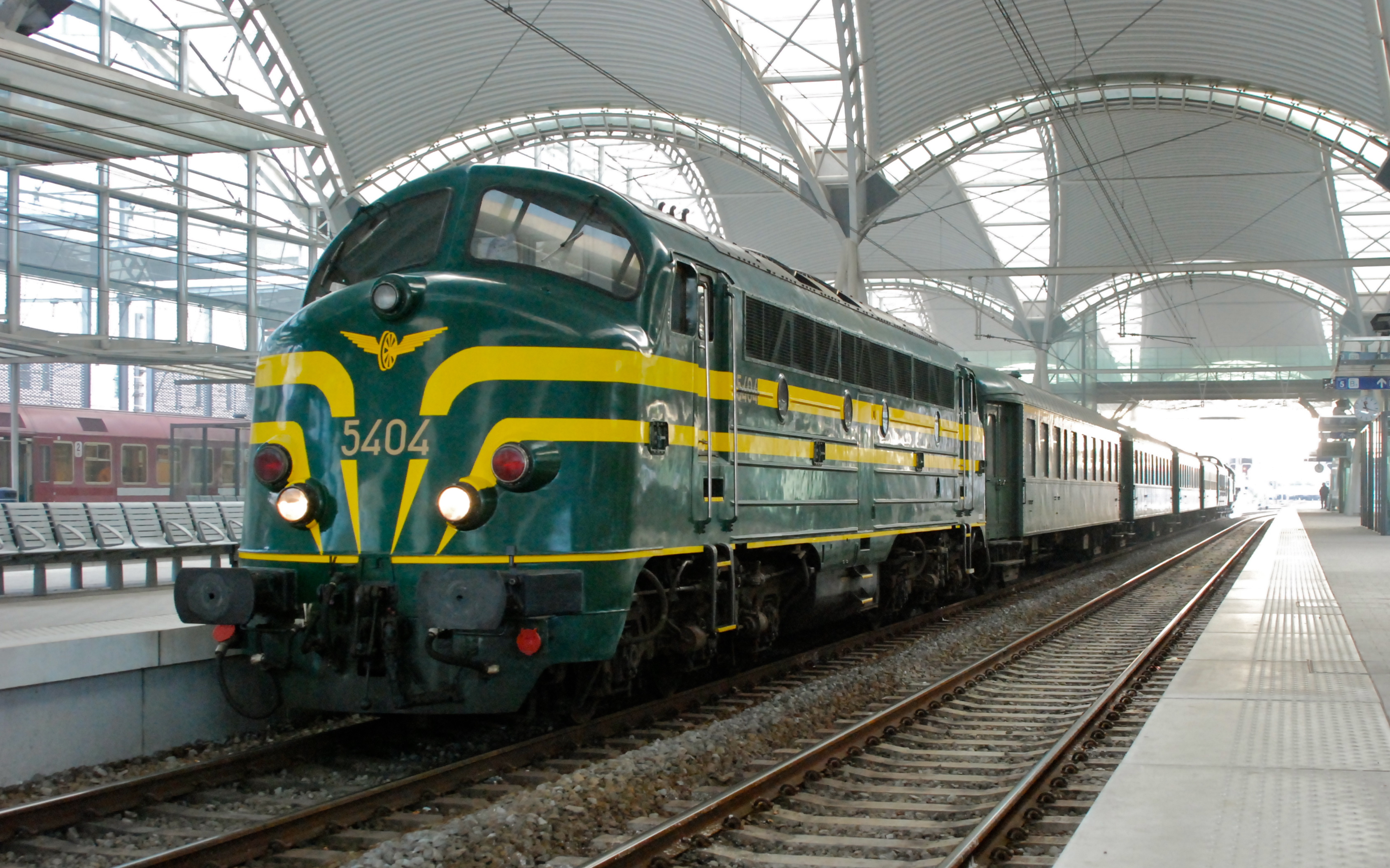
- Unit 5404 shown in 2010
Type and origin
- Power type: Diesel-electric
- Designer: General Motors EMD
- Builder: Anglo-Franco-Belge
- Build date: middle to late 1950s
- Total produced: 8
- Rebuild date: late 1970s
Specifications
- Configuration
  - AAR: C-C
  - UIC: Co′Co′
- Gauge: standard gauge
- Wheel diameter: 1,010 mm (3 ft)
- Minimum curve: 90 m (295 ft)
- Wheelbase
  - Engine: 1 Engine
- Length: 18.85m
- Width: 2.94m
- Height: 4.237m
- Loco weight: 108t
- Fuel type: Diesel
- Fuel capacity: 3,500 liters (920 U.S. gal) 769 imp gallon
- Lubricant cap.: 750 L (200 U.S. gal) 164 imp gallon
- Water cap.: 800 L (210 U.S. gal)
- Sandbox cap.: 640 kg (1,410 lb)
- Prime mover: EMD 16-567C
- Engine type: Diesel V16
- Cylinders: 16
- Transmission: Electric
- MU working: Yes
- Train heating: Steam
- Loco brake: Air
- Train brakes: Air
- Couplers: Screw link
Performance figures
- Maximum speed: as built 140km/h (87 mph), after 1980: 120 km/h (75 mph)
- Power output
  - Starting: 261 kN (58675 lbf)
  - Continuous: 245 kN (55078 lbf)
Career
- Operators: SNCB, CFL
- Nicknames: Gros Nez (Big Nose)
- Last run: main live service 2002, secondary lines and work train service: 2009
- Preserved: 1, unit 5404 at Train World
- Scrapped: 2013, 2016

Series 54, (originally Type 204) were diesel locomotives used by the National Railway Company of Belgium (NMBS/SNCB). Along with Series 52, 53 and 59, they were the first generation of Belgian diesel locomotives, built in the 1950s. All three types were ultimately derived from the earlier Series 52 locos, representing a faster version of the design, allowing for 140 km/h usage instead of 120 km/h.

The Series 54 (along with the similar Series 52 and 53 locos) were known as the "Big Noses", given their silhouette. An American design from General Motors - Electro-Motive Diesel, they also have several cousins built in Sweden by Nohab for the Hungarian State Railways (MÁV) as Serie M61, for the Danish Railways (DSB) as Series MX and MY and for the Norwegian Railways (NSB) as Serie Di 3. Their design was largely derived from Victorian Railways B class diesels in Australia.

== History ==
After the Second World War, the National Railway Company of Belgium resumed railway operations using mostly steam locomotives that had survived the conflict as their primary means of transport, mostly locomotives built during the war (Types 25 and 26, based on the German "kriegslok") or others that were built in Canada (Type 29). However, it was quickly becoming apparent that diesel traction offered serious savings and the railway then decided to purchase units from where such locomotives were at their most mature: in the United States and specifically units from General Motors - EMD (Electro-Motive Division).

After a series of tests (most notably with an MRS-1 locomotive number 1818 borrowed from the US Army) an order for 40 units was placed in the mid 1950s, split into two sub-series : 22 Serie 52 locomotives (known at the time as Type 202), fitted with steam heating for passenger coaches and 18 Serie 53 locomotives (known as Type 203 at the time), without steam heating apparatus.

The units used diesel engines from the USA, generators and electric motors coming from the Netherlands. These diesel engines had a power output of 1265 kW (1700 hp).

A few years later, the order was completed using a lighter locomotive design which was a product of local industry: the Series 59 locomotives with a Bo'Bo' wheel arrangement. Also, an improved series of "Big Nose" units were built: Serie 55 locomotives which incorporated the trucks and the General Motors engine placed in a different locomotive body.

Delivery of the last four motive power units was amended to include a different set of gears; upon delivery in 1957, they allowed for speeds of 140 km/h for the Trans-Europ-Express trains between Paris and Cologne, pending electrification of the Belgian railway line 125 between Namur and Liège. These units were placed and numbered in the Type 204 series, becoming the future Series 54 after a general renumbering on January 1, 1971.

Simultaneously, the NMBS/SNCB ceded 4 Series 52 locomotives to the CFL. In return, an additional order for four Series 54 locomotives was placed, bringing the total number to 8 units.

By the end of the 1970s, NMBS/SNCB responded to the complaints of their locomotive engineers over various inconveniences with the driving position of these locomotives: they were very uncomfortable and their prominent hoods along with the position of the controls on the right side of the units while driving in the left lane hampered visibility of the track-level signals along the line that were flush with the ground. By the start of the 1980s, replacement of the round cabins with so-called "floating cabins" (so named due to the presence of a rubber damping layer) in which the driver, now placed on the left side, was in a better position to see the track. Only unit number 5404 was not modified, for reasons of historical preservation.

As it had been many years since these 8 units had not hauled "prestige trains", their trucks were modified in 1980 to return them to a maximum speed of 120 km/h (as their sister Series 52 and Series 53 units were so equipped). The modified locomotives were used to haul heavy cargo trains through the Ardennes, on lines 165 and 166 (from Athus to Meuse) and the few passenger trains that were not served by Series 43 railcars.

By 2002, the opening of the electrified Athus-Meuse line eliminated their main purpose, after 45 years of service. They were still allocated for some time to the Stockem depot, used for local services to the Burgo Ardennes paper mill in Harnoncourt or the Valvert factory in Etalle in particular. The arrival of Series 77 locomotives in Stockem sounded the death knell for the "Big Noses" and led to them being parked. Units not needing major maintenance work would end up as workhorses on the LGV2 or GEN/RER construction sites.

In 2009, TUC RAIL used the locomotives still in working order to haul works trains. They were mainly used out of Braine l'Alleud, home base for the construction of the GEN/RER along Line 124.

Unit 5404 has been preserved at Train World since retirement in 1999. It wears a dark green livery with yellow stripes and is decorated with a winged wheel at the front.

== Unit History ==
- These units helped launch the Trans Europ Express between Paris and Brussels after the Second World War when the line was not completely electrified, due to their higher speed compared to other available units.
- They hauled various prestige passenger trains, before rejoining their sister units in freight service between Athus and Meuse (along Lines 165 et 166), on various branch lines (Lines 155, 163, 167 and as backup traction along the trans-border Line 162.
- All units were parked at Stockem by the end of 2009, hoping for an eventual sale. By 2013, due to a lack of buyers and as their storage space was sought for Series 11 and 12, most were sold for scrap. Those left at Schaerbeek followed suit in 2016.

== See also ==
* List of SNCB/NMBS classes
