= Danish Museum of Science and Technology =

- Danmarks Tekniske Museum
- Airplane Sven Viking (OY-DDA) exhibited at the Danish Museum of Science and Technology (2018).
- Established: 1911
- Location: Helsingør, Denmark
- Coordinates: 56°1′20″N 12°33′45″E
- Type: Science museum
- Visitors: c. 60,000 per year
- Website: tekniskmuseum.dk

The Danish Museum of Science and Technology (Danish: Danmarks Tekniske Museum) is a science museum in Helsingør, Denmark.

The museum was originally located at the Technical University of Denmark, but moved to its current location in Helsingør in 1965. As of 2026, there are ongoing plans to move the museum to the disused Svanemølle Power Station.

== See also ==
- List of museums in Denmark
- List of science museums
