= DSB Class MX =

Class of 45 Danish A1A-A1A diesel locomotives

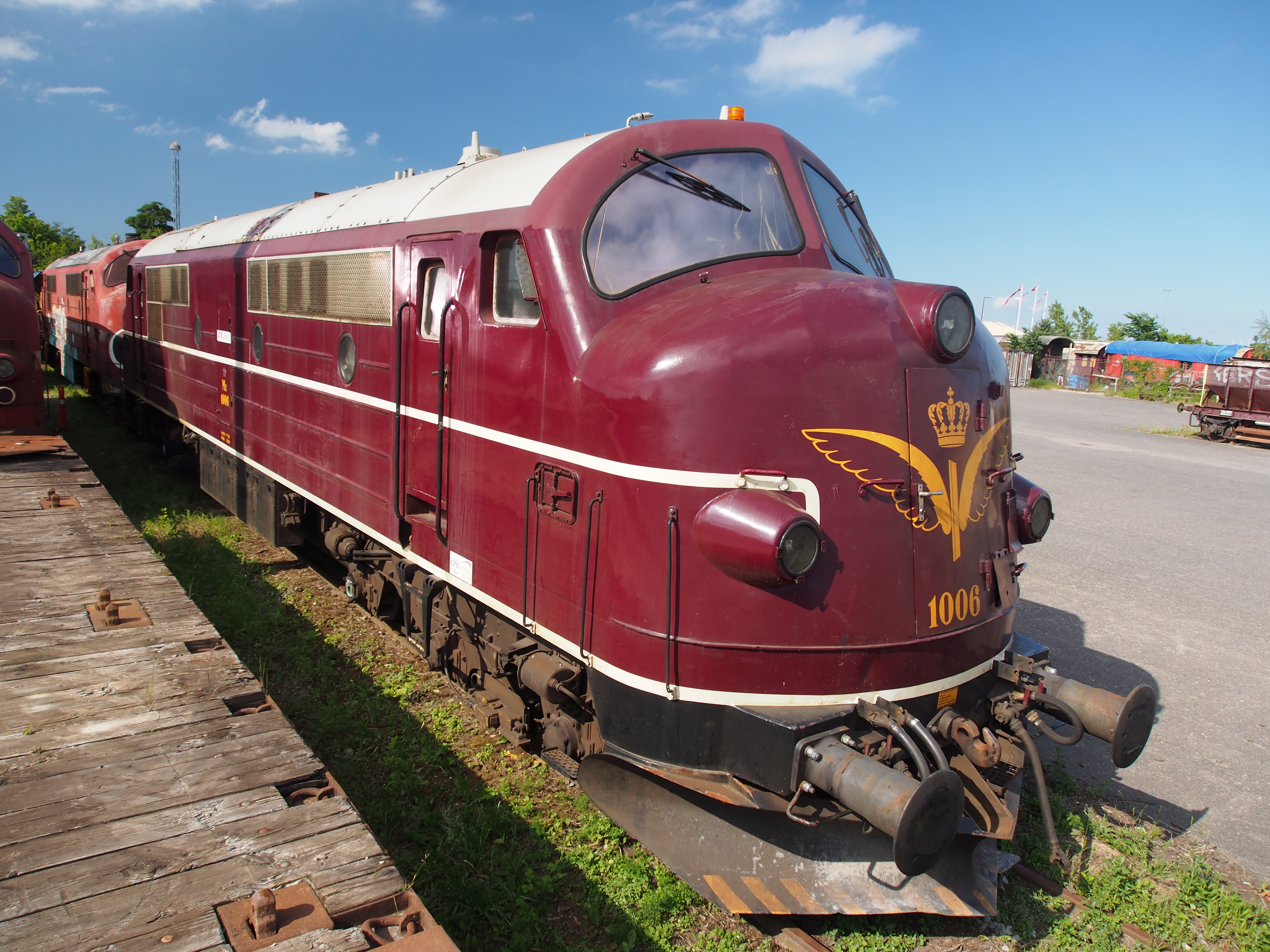
Type and origin
- Power type: Diesel-electric
- Builder: Nydqist & Holm
- Build date: 1960–1962
- Total produced: 45
Specifications
- Configuration
  - UIC: (A1A)(A1A)
- Length: 18.30 m (60 ft 0 in)
- Loco weight: 89 t (88 long tons; 98 short tons)
- Cylinders: V12
Performance figures
- Power output: 1,425 hp (1,063 kW); 1,445 hp (1,078 kW)
- Tractive effort: ca 208 kN (47,000 lb_{f})
Career
- Locale: Denmark; Sweden

Maintenance	This page has an infobox that is missing one or more vital fields and needs to be updated. Please consult the relevant WikiProject or this category to find the appropriate usage.

The DSB Class MX is a lightweight, diesel-electric locomotive built by the Swedish company Nydqist & Holm between 1960 and 1962 for the Danish State Railways

== History ==
After having great success with the MY locos, DSB started to search for a lighter locomotive for some of the smaller stretches on which the MYs were too heavy to run.

The first unit, 1001 arrived to Denmark in 1960 and got just as popular as its big-brothers in short time - the first 20 units (1001–1020) produced 1,425 horsepower (1,063 kW) whilst the last units, 1020-1045 produced 1,445 horsepower (1,078 kW).

Many of the MXs have been sold to Danish private railways, but some have also been sold to Sweden and some other countries. In Sweden they are called TMX, as diesel locomotive class designations usually begin with T there. Informally nicknamed Gammel Dansk referring to the popular herbal liquor associated with Denmark, whilst also being a popular name as it means "Old Danish" literally translated.

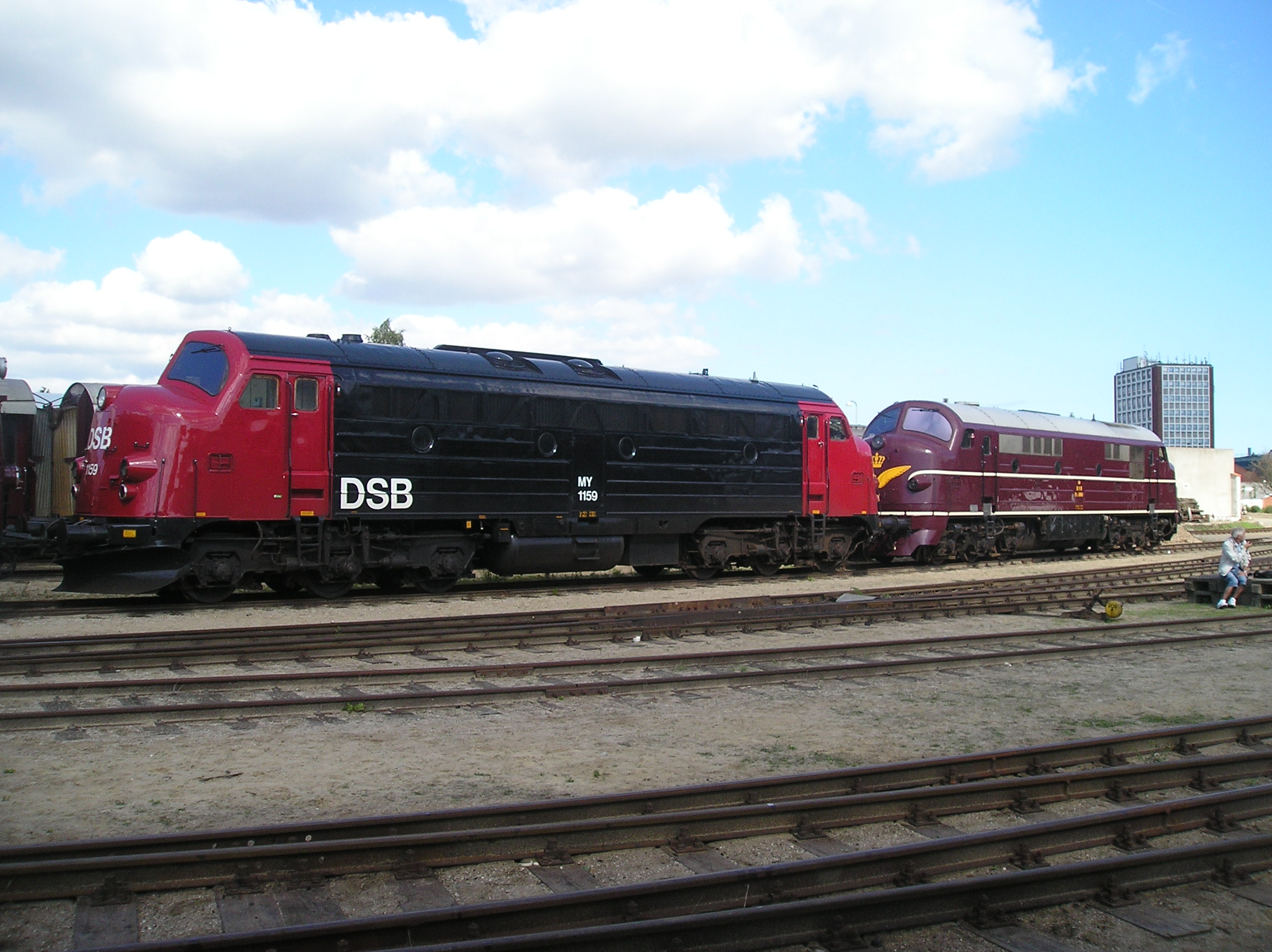
A DSB class MY (left), and a Class MX (right)

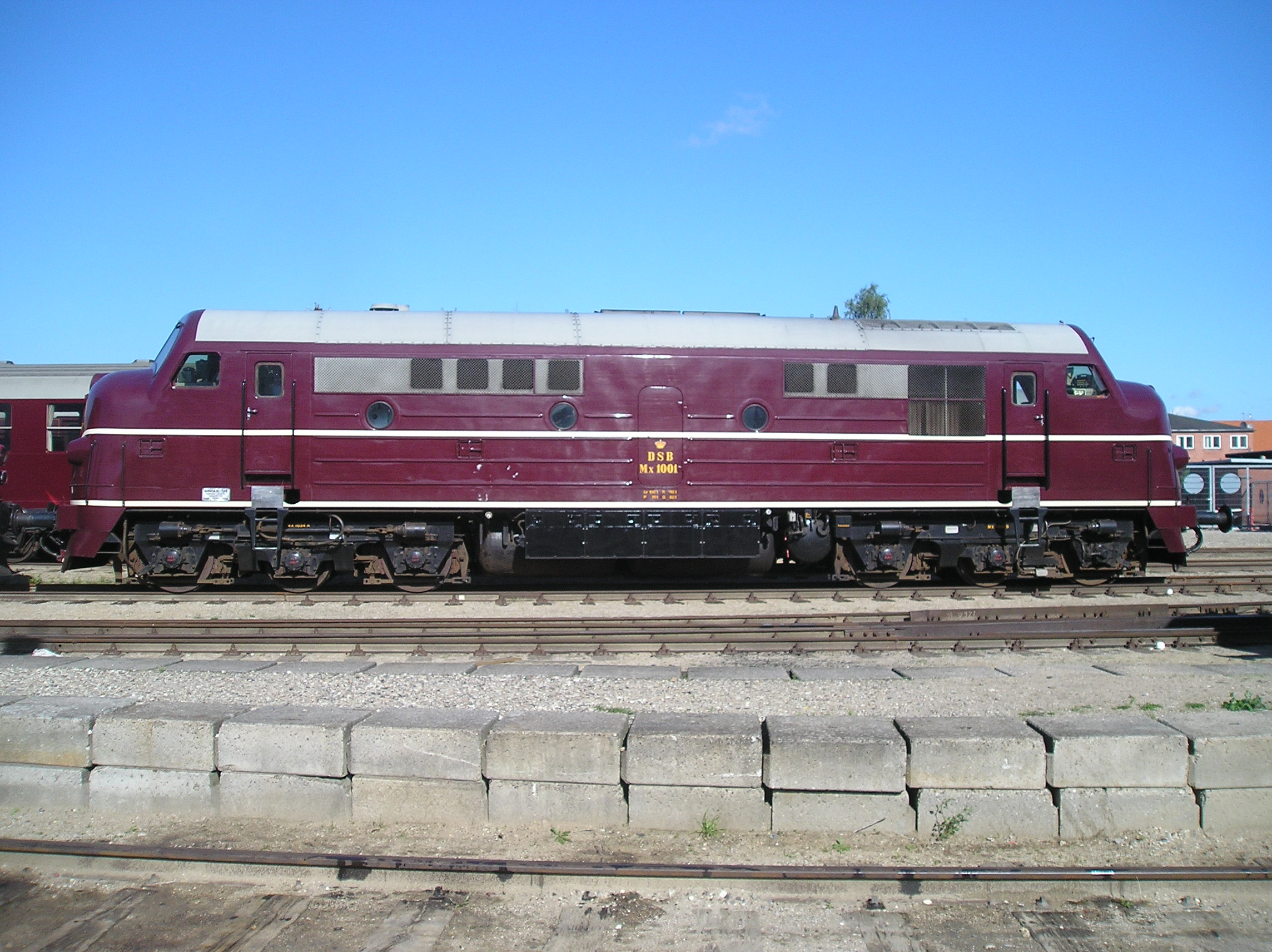
Side view

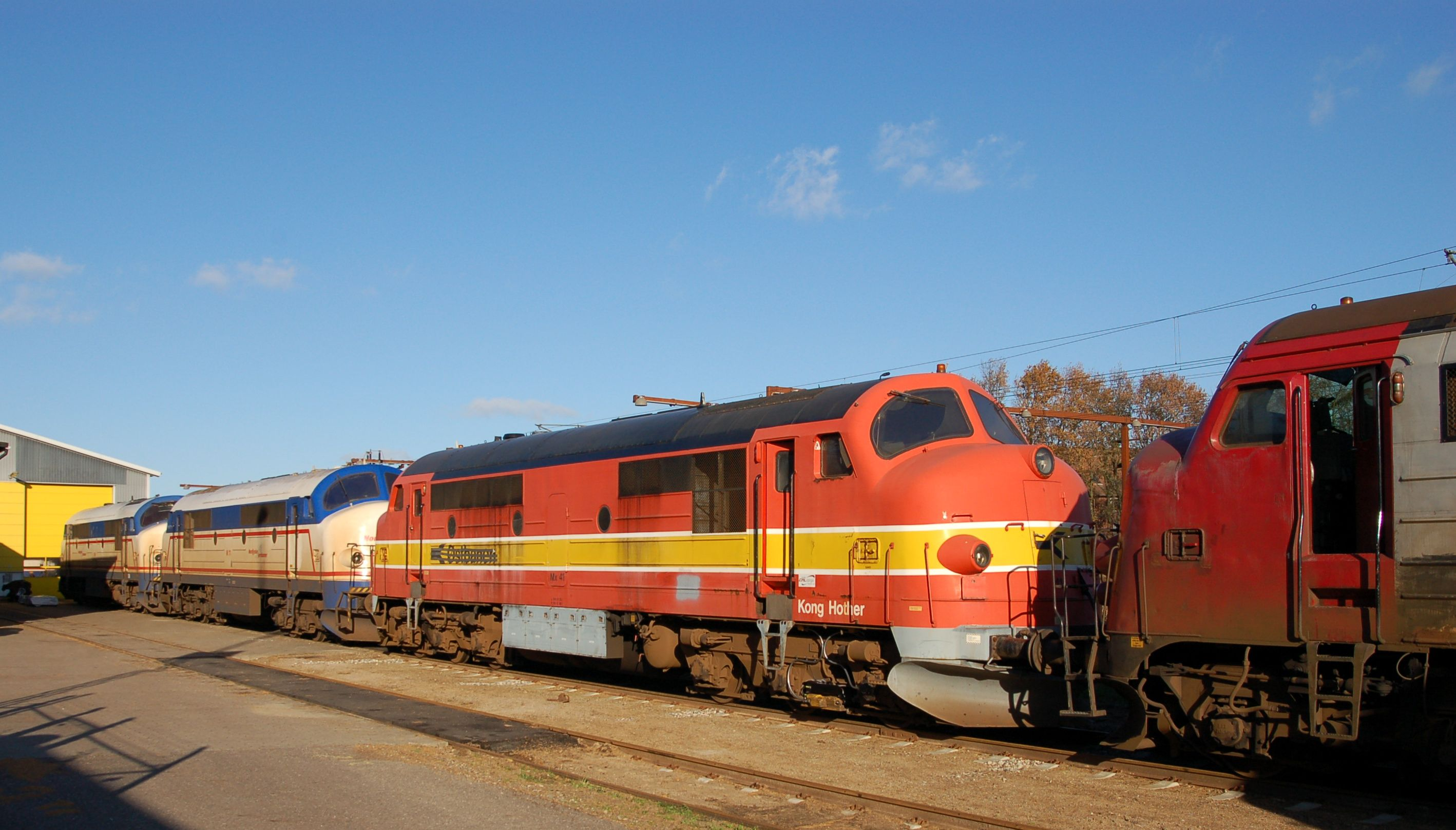
Several Private-Owned MX and MY in Padborg

== See also ==
- DSB class MY
